= Nelly discography =

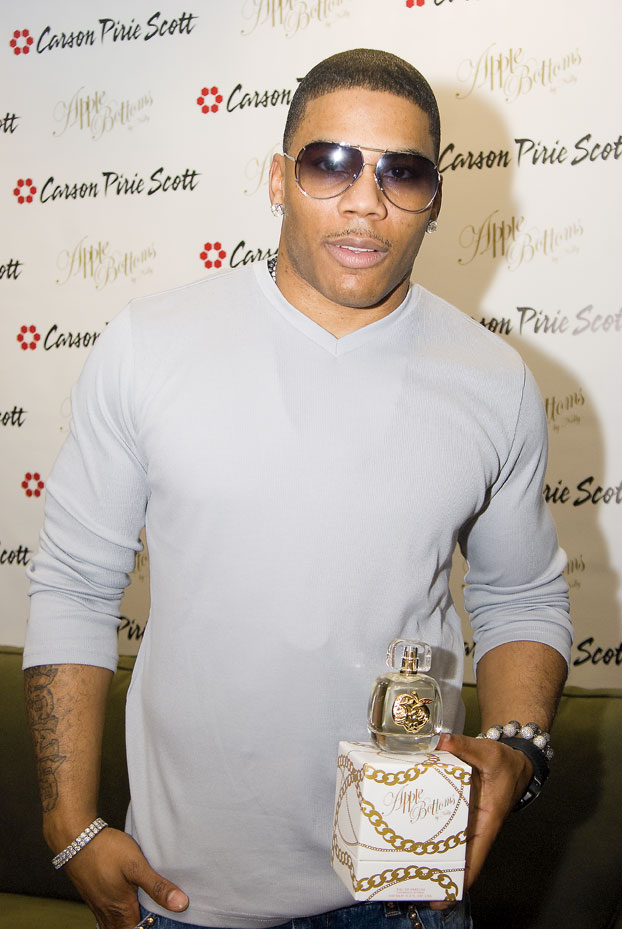
- Nelly promoting Apple Bottom fragrance at North Riverside Mall, Illinois in 2010
- Studio albums: 8
- Extended plays: 3
- Compilation albums: 2
- Singles: 49
- Music videos: 48
- Remix albums: 1
- Mixtapes: 2
- Promotional singles: 3

American rapper and singer Nelly has released eight studio albums, two compilation albums, one remix album, three extended plays, two mixtapes, 49 singles (including 14 as a featured performer), three promotional singles and 48 music videos. He was also a member of the hip hop group St. Lunatics, which included fellow rappers Ali, City Spud, Murphy Lee, and Kyjuan. Nelly has sold a total of 21,815,000 albums in the US as of June 2014, making him the fourth bestselling rap artist in the country.

Nelly pursued a career as a solo performer after the St. Lunatics initially failed to achieve commercial success. He soon caught the attention of Universal Records, who signed him on a record deal. Nelly released his debut solo studio album, Country Grammar, in 2000, with most of the album's production coming from Jason Epperson. The album topped the US Billboard 200 and spawned the internationally successful singles "Country Grammar (Hot Shit)", "E.I.", "Ride wit Me" and "Batter Up", with all except the latter song also reaching the top 15 on the US Billboard Hot 100. Country Grammar has since been certified ten times platinum by the Recording Industry Association of America, and as of January 2011 had sold 8,489,000 copies in the United States, making it the fourth highest-selling hip hop album of all time. The following year, Nelly collaborated with the American R&B group Jagged Edge on the single "Where the Party At" and appeared on a remix of "Girlfriend", a song by boy band 'N Sync, in 2002. Both songs reached the top five of the Hot 100.

Nelly's second studio album, Nellyville, was released in the same year. It reached number one on the Billboard 200, as well as appearing in the top five of several European album charts. Five singles were released from Nellyville, including the Hot 100-topping singles "Hot in Herre" and "Dilemma", as well as "Air Force Ones", "Work It" and "Pimp Juice". In 2004, Nelly received criticism stemming from the music video for his song "E.I. (Reinvention)", also known as "Tip Drill", for its overtly sexual content and apparent objectification of women. Despite this negative publicity, he went on to collaborate with fellow rappers P. Diddy and Murphy Lee on "Shake Ya Tailfeather", a song recorded for the soundtrack to the 2003 film Bad Boys II. It reached number one in the United States. Nelly's respective third and fourth studio albums, Sweat and Suit, were released simultaneously later in 2004: the former featuring urban and uptempo-oriented material, while the latter is more pop-themed. A total of seven singles were released from the two albums in total, with "Over and Over"– a collaboration with country singer Tim McGraw– proving the most successful, reaching number three on the Hot 100 and number one on the UK Singles Chart. A compilation album containing several songs from the two albums, titled Sweatsuit, was released in 2005. It also featured the single "Grillz", which became Nelly's fourth single to top the Hot 100.

Nelly's fifth album, Brass Knuckles, was released in 2008, featuring the singles "Wadsyaname", "Party People", "Stepped on My J'z", "Body on Me" and "One and Only". However, it failed to match the commercial success of Nelly's previous albums, only reaching number three on the Billboard 200. Nelly's sixth album, 5.0, followed in 2010. "Just a Dream", the first single from 5.0, became Nelly's most successful song in several years, reaching number three on the Hot 100. The album spawned two further singles, "Move That Body" and "Gone". His seventh album, M.O., was released in 2013, and included the UK top-ten single "Hey Porsche".

Nelly's eighth album, Heartland, was released in 2021 and included the single "Lil Bit" featuring country music duo Florida Georgia Line.

== Albums ==
=== Studio albums ===
List of studio albums, with selected chart positions, sales figures and certifications
| Title | Album details | Peak chart positions | | | | | | | | | | Sales | Certifications |
| Title | Album details | US | AUS | CAN | GER | IRL | NLD | NZ | SWE | SWI | UK | Sales | Certifications |
|---|---|---|---|---|---|---|---|---|---|---|---|---|---|
| Country Grammar | Released: June 27, 2000 (US); Label: Fo' Reel, Universal; Formats: CD, cassette, digital download | 1 | 4 | 7 | 45 | 15 | 8 | 3 | — | 90 | 14 | US: 10,000,000 | RIAA: Diamond; ARIA: Platinum; BPI: Platinum; BVMI: Gold; MC: 3× Platinum; RMNZ: 3× Platinum |
| Nellyville | Released: June 25, 2002 (US); Label: Fo' Reel, Universal; Formats: CD, cassette, digital download | 1 | 2 | 2 | 2 | 3 | 4 | 2 | 11 | 6 | 2 | US: 6,488,000; UK: 769,000 | RIAA: 7× Platinum; ARIA: 3× Platinum; BPI: 2× Platinum; BVMI: Gold; IFPI SWE: Gold; IFPI SWI: Platinum; MC: 4× Platinum; RMNZ: 2× Platinum |
| Sweat | Released: September 14, 2004 (US); Label: Derrty, Universal; Formats: CD, cassette, digital download | 2 | 10 | 2 | 17 | 34 | 28 | 7 | 41 | 16 | 11 | | RIAA: Platinum; ARIA: Gold; BPI: Gold; RMNZ: Gold |
| Suit | Released: September 14, 2004 (US); Label: Derrty, Universal; Formats: CD, cassette, digital download | 1 | 7 | 1 | 8 | 21 | 17 | 6 | 34 | 11 | 8 | | RIAA: 3× Platinum; ARIA: Gold; BPI: Platinum; RMNZ: Platinum |
| Brass Knuckles | Released: September 16, 2008 (US); Label: Derrty, Universal Motown; Formats: CD, digital download | 3 | 15 | 22 | — | 60 | — | 22 | — | 55 | 20 | US: 223,000 | RIAA: Gold |
| 5.0 | Released: November 16, 2010 (US); Label: Derrty, Universal Motown; Formats: CD, digital download | 10 | 17 | 19 | 63 | 91 | — | — | — | 52 | 59 | US: 314,000 | RMNZ: Gold |
| M.O. | Released: September 30, 2013 (US); Label: Derrty, Republic; Formats: CD, digital download | 14 | 81 | — | — | — | — | — | — | — | 89 | US: 23,000 | |
| Heartland | Released: August 27, 2021 (US); Label: Columbia; Format: Digital download, streaming | 45 | — | 37 | — | — | — | — | — | — | — | | RIAA: Gold |
"—" denotes a recording that did not chart or was not released in that territory.

=== Compilation albums ===
List of compilation albums, with selected chart positions and certifications
| Title | Album details | Peak chart positions | | | | | | Certifications |
| Title | Album details | US | US R&B | US Rap | AUS | NZ | UK | Certifications |
|---|---|---|---|---|---|---|---|---|
| Sweatsuit | Released: May 2005; Label: Derrty, Universal; Formats: CD, digital download | 26 | 6 | 5 | 22 | 36 | 41 | RIAA: Gold; BPI: Gold |
| The Best of Nelly | Released: February 9, 2009 (JPN); Label: Derrty, Universal International; Formats: CD, digital download | — | — | — | — | — | — | BPI: Gold |
| Still Hot in Herre | Released: October 16, 2022 (US); Label: Republic, Universal; Formats: CD, digital download | — | — | — | — | — | — | BPI: Gold |
"—" denotes a recording that did not chart or was not released in that territory.

=== Live albums ===
List of live albums
| Title | Album details |
|---|---|
| Country Grammar (Live) | Released: February 19, 2021; Label: UMG Recordings, Republic; Formats: Digital download |

=== Remix albums ===
List of remix albums, with selected chart positions and certifications
| Title | Album details | Peak chart positions | | | | | | Certifications |
| Title | Album details | US | US R&B | AUS | GER | SWI | UK | Certifications |
|---|---|---|---|---|---|---|---|---|
| Da Derrty Versions: The Reinvention | Released: November 25, 2003 (US); Label: Derrty, Universal; Formats: CD, digital download | 12 | 6 | 91 | 85 | 91 | 94 | BPI: Silver |

=== Mixtapes ===
List of mixtapes, with selected information
| Title | Album details |
|---|---|
| O.E.MO | Released: December 24, 2011 (US); Label: Derrty; Format: Digital download |
| Scorpio Season | Released: November 2, 2012 (US); Label: Derrty; Format: Digital download |

== Extended plays ==
List of extended plays, with selected chart positions
| Title | Details | Peak chart positions | |
| Title | Details | US R&B | US Rap |
|---|---|---|---|
| 6 Derrty Hits | Released: November 25, 2008 (US); Label: Derrty, Universal Motown; Format: CD, digital download | 57 | 24 |
| 6 Pack | Released: October 12, 2010 (US); Label: Derrty, Universal Motown; Format: Digital download | — | — |
"—" denotes a recording that did not chart or was not released in that territory.

== Singles ==
=== As lead artist ===
List of singles as lead artist, with selected chart positions and certifications, showing year released and album name
| Title | Year | Peak chart positions | | | | | | | | | | Certifications | Album |
| Title | Year | US | AUS | CAN | GER | IRL | NLD | NZ | SWE | SWI | UK | Certifications | Album |
|---|---|---|---|---|---|---|---|---|---|---|---|---|---|
| "Country Grammar (Hot Shit)" | 2000 | 7 | 20 | 10 | 20 | 22 | 20 | 42 | 56 | 58 | 7 | RIAA: 4× Platinum; ARIA: Gold; RMNZ: Platinum | Country Grammar |
| "E.I." | 2000 | 15 | 12 | — | 22 | 15 | 30 | — | — | 89 | 11 | RIAA: Platinum; ARIA: Gold; RMNZ: Gold | Country Grammar |
| "Ride wit Me" (featuring City Spud) | 2001 | 3 | 4 | — | 25 | 4 | 6 | 20 | 14 | 22 | 3 | RIAA: 5× Platinum; ARIA: Platinum; BPI: 2× Platinum; BVMI: Gold; RMNZ: 5× Platinum | Country Grammar |
| "Batter Up" (featuring St. Lunatics) | 2001 | — | 19 | — | 79 | 30 | 31 | — | — | 75 | 28 | RIAA: Gold | Country Grammar |
| "#1" | 2001 | 22 | 20 | — | 16 | — | 52 | — | — | 22 | — | | Training Day/ Nellyville |
| "Hot in Herre" | 2002 | 1 | 3 | 1 | 8 | 10 | 3 | 3 | 6 | 10 | 4 | RIAA: 2× Platinum; ARIA: Platinum; BPI: 2× Platinum; BVMI: Gold; RMNZ: 3× Platinum | Nellyville |
| "Dilemma" (featuring Kelly Rowland) | 2002 | 1 | 1 | 3 | 1 | 1 | 1 | 2 | 2 | 1 | 1 | ARIA: 3× Platinum; BPI: 4× Platinum; BVMI: Gold; IFPI SWE: Gold; IFPI SWI: Platinum; RMNZ: 5× Platinum | Nellyville |
| "Air Force Ones" (featuring Kyjuan, Murphy Lee and Ali) | 2002 | 3 | — | — | — | — | — | — | — | — | — | RMNZ: Gold | Nellyville |
| "Work It" (featuring Justin Timberlake) | 2003 | 68 | 14 | 13 | 31 | 11 | 16 | 17 | 41 | 59 | 7 | ARIA: Gold | Nellyville |
| "Pimp Juice" | 2003 | 58 | — | — | — | — | — | — | — | — | — | | Nellyville |
| "Shake Ya Tailfeather" (with P. Diddy and Murphy Lee) | 2003 | 1 | 3 | 14 | 26 | 13 | 21 | 3 | 17 | 10 | 10 | RIAA: Gold; ARIA: Platinum; RMNZ: Gold | Bad Boys II (soundtrack)/Murphy's Law |
| "Iz U" | 2003 | — (Note: "Iz U" did not enter the Billboard Hot 100, but peaked at number 3 on the Bubbling Under Hot 100 Singles chart, which acts as an extension to the Hot 100.) | 34 | — | 47 | 35 | 97 | — | — | 43 | 36 | | Da Derrty Versions: The Reinvention |
| "Flap Your Wings" (Note: "Flap Your Wings" and "My Place" charted as a double A-side single in certain territories.) | 2004 | 52 | 1 | — | — | 2 | — | 1 | — | — | 1 | RIAA: Gold; ARIA: Platinum; BPI: Silver; RMNZ: Gold | Sweat |
| "My Place" (featuring Jaheim) | 2004 | 4 | 1 | — | 8 | 2 | 3 | 1 | 18 | 5 | 1 | RIAA: Gold; ARIA: Platinum; BPI: Silver; RMNZ: Platinum | Suit |
| "Tilt Ya Head Back" (featuring Christina Aguilera) | 2004 | 58 | 5 | — | 27 | 12 | 16 | 4 | — | 16 | 5 | RIAA: Gold; ARIA: Platinum | Sweat |
| "Over and Over" (featuring Tim McGraw) | 2004 | 3 | 1 | — | 8 | 1 | 28 | 2 | 16 | 6 | 1 | RIAA: Platinum; ARIA: 2× Platinum; BPI: Gold; RMNZ: Platinum | Suit |
| "Na-NaNa-Na" (featuring Jazze Pha) | 2005 | — | — | — | — | — | — | — | — | — | — | | Sweat |
| "'N' Dey Say" | 2005 | 64 | 20 | — | 30 | 11 | 80 | 17 | — | 23 | 6 | | Suit |
| "Errtime" (featuring Jung Tru and King Jacob) | 2005 | 24 | 15 | — | 54 | — | — | 21 | — | — | — | RIAA: Gold | The Longest Yard (soundtrack) |
| "Fly Away" | 2005 | — (Note: "Fly Away" did not enter the Billboard Hot 100, but peaked at number 24 on the Bubbling Under Hot 100 Singles chart, which acts as an extension to the Hot 100.) | — | — | — | — | — | — | — | — | — | | The Longest Yard (soundtrack) |
| "Grillz" (featuring Paul Wall and Ali & Gipp) | 2005 | 1 | 11 | — | 53 | 12 | — | 10 | — | — | 24 | RIAA: Platinum; RMNZ: Gold | Sweatsuit |
| "Wadsyaname" | 2007 | 43 | — | — | — | — | — | 4 | — | — | — | RMNZ: Gold | Brass Knuckles |
| "Party People" (featuring Fergie) | 2008 | 40 | 14 | 52 | 23 | 12 | — | 7 | — | — | 14 | | Brass Knuckles |
| "Body on Me" (featuring Akon and Ashanti) | 2008 | 42 | 32 | 57 | — | 12 | — | 19 | — | — | 17 | RMNZ: Platinum | Brass Knuckles |
| "Stepped on My J'z" (featuring Jermaine Dupri and Ciara) | 2008 | 90 | — | — | — | — | — | — | — | — | — | | Brass Knuckles |
| "Warrior" | 2008 | 96 | — | — | — | — | — | — | — | — | — | | AT&T Team USA/Brass Knuckles |
| "One and Only" | 2008 | — | — | — | — | — | — | — | — | — | — | | Brass Knuckles |
| "Just a Dream" | 2010 | 3 | 3 | 5 | 17 | 8 | 17 | 5 | 15 | 22 | 8 | RIAA: 3× Platinum; ARIA: 3× Platinum; BPI: 2× Platinum; BVMI: Gold; IFPI SWE: Gold; IFPI SWI: Gold; RMNZ: 4× Platinum | 5.0 |
| "Move That Body" (featuring T-Pain and Akon) | 2010 | 54 | 29 | — | — | — | — | — | — | — | 71 | | 5.0 |
| "Gone" (featuring Kelly Rowland) | 2011 | — (Note: "Gone" did not enter the Billboard Hot 100, but peaked at number 13 on the Bubbling Under Hot 100 Singles chart, which acts as an extension to the Hot 100.) | 55 | — | — | — | — | — | — | — | 58 | | 5.0 |
| "The Champ" | 2011 | 61 | 64 | — | — | — | — | — | — | — | — | | Non-album single |
| "Hey Porsche" | 2013 | 42 | 5 | 26 | 22 | 8 | — | 7 | — | 34 | 6 | ARIA: 2× Platinum; BPI: Gold; BVMI: Gold; RMNZ: Platinum | M.O. |
| "Get Like Me" (featuring Nicki Minaj and Pharrell Williams) | 2013 | — (Note: "Get Like Me" did not enter the Billboard Hot 100, but peaked at number 8 on the Bubbling Under Hot 100 Singles chart, which acts as an extension to the Hot 100.) | — | — | — | 96 | — | — | — | — | 19 | | M.O. |
| "Heaven" (featuring Daley) | 2013 | — | — | — | — | — | — | — | — | — | — | | M.O. |
| "Rick James" (featuring T.I.) | 2013 | — | — | — | — | — | — | — | — | — | — | | M.O. |
| "The Fix" (featuring Jeremih) | 2015 | 62 | 3 | 88 | — | — | — | 15 | — | — | 82 | RIAA: Platinum; ARIA: 2× Platinum; BPI: Silver; RMNZ: 2× Platinum | Non-album singles |
| "Freaky with You" (featuring Jacquees) | 2018 | — | — | — | — | — | — | — | — | — | — | | Non-album singles |
| "Good Times Roll" (with Jimmie Allen) | 2020 | — | — | — | — | — | — | — | — | — | — | RIAA: Gold | Bettie James/ Heartland |
| "Lil Bit" (with Florida Georgia Line) | 2020 | 23 | — | 35 | — | — | — | — | — | — | — | RIAA: 3× Platinum; RMNZ: Gold | Heartland |
| "High Horse" (with Breland and Blanco Brown) | 2021 | — | — | — | — | — | — | — | — | — | — | | Heartland |
"—" denotes a recording that did not chart or was not released in that territory.

=== As featured artist ===
List of singles as featured artist, with selected chart positions and certifications, showing year released and album name
| Title | Year | Peak chart positions | | | | | | | | | | Certifications | Album |
| Title | Year | US | AUS | CAN | GER | IRL | NLD | NZ | SWE | SWI | UK | Certifications | Album |
|---|---|---|---|---|---|---|---|---|---|---|---|---|---|
| "Where the Party At" (Jagged Edge featuring Nelly) | 2001 | 3 | 13 | 17 | 37 | — | 29 | 33 | — | 45 | 25 | ARIA: Gold; BPI: Silver; RMNZ: Platinum | Jagged Little Thrill |
| "Girlfriend (The Neptunes Remix)" (NSYNC featuring Nelly) | 2002 | 5 | 2 | 1 | 6 | 8 | 8 | 13 | 36 | 23 | 2 | ARIA: Gold; BPI: Gold; RMNZ: Gold | Celebrity |
| "All Night Long" (Brian McKnight featuring Nelly) | 2003 | — | — | — | — | — | — | — | — | — | — | | U-Turn |
| "Hold Up" (Murphy Lee featuring Nelly) | 2004 | — | — | — | — | — | — | — | — | — | — | | Murphy's Law |
| "Get It Poppin'" (Fat Joe featuring Nelly) | 2005 | 9 | 30 | — | 48 | 26 | — | 24 | — | 49 | 34 | RIAA: Gold | All or Nothing |
| "Nasty Girl" (The Notorious B.I.G. featuring Diddy, Nelly, Jagged Edge, and Avery Storm) | 2005 | 44 | 15 | — | 8 | 5 | 22 | 7 | 40 | 14 | 1 | RIAA: Gold; BPI: 2× Platinum; RMNZ: 2× Platinum | Duets: The Final Chapter |
| "Call on Me" (with Janet Jackson) | 2006 | 25 | — | — | 45 | 20 | — | 11 | 25 | 43 | 18 | RMNZ: Gold | 20 Y.O. |
| "N' Da Paint" (Ali & Gipp featuring Nelly) | 2007 | — | — | — | — | — | — | — | — | — | — | | Kinfolk |
| "5000 Ones" (DJ Drama featuring Nelly, T.I., Diddy, Yung Joc, Willie the Kid, Young Jeezy, and Twista) | 2007 | — | — | — | — | — | — | — | — | — | — | | Gangsta Grillz: The Album |
| "Here I Am" (Rick Ross featuring Nelly and Avery Storm) | 2008 | 41 | — | — | — | — | — | — | — | — | — | RIAA: Gold; RMNZ: Platinum | Trilla |
| "Miss Me" (Mohombi featuring Nelly) | 2010 | — | — | — | — | — | — | — | — | — | 66 | | MoveMeant |
| "Lose Control (Let Me Down)" (Keri Hilson featuring Nelly) | 2011 | — | — | — | — | — | 50 | 36 | — | — | — | | No Boys Allowed |
| "About That Life" (DJ Kay Slay featuring Fabolous, T-Pain, Rick Ross, Nelly, and French Montana) | 2013 | — | — | — | — | — | — | — | — | — | — | | Non-album single |
| "Cruise (Remix)" (Florida Georgia Line featuring Nelly) | 2013 | 4 | — | — | — | — | — | 34 | — | — | 75 | | Here's to the Good Times |
| "I Don't Wanna Go to Bed" (Simple Plan featuring Nelly) | 2015 | — | — | 54 | — | — | — | — | — | — | — | MC: Gold | Taking One for the Team |
| "Millionaire" (Cash Cash and Digital Farm Animals featuring Nelly) | 2016 | — | 63 | — | — | 55 | 46 | — | 98 | — | 25 | BPI: Gold; RMNZ: Gold | Blood, Sweat & 3 Years |
| "This Lil' Game We Play" (Jermaine Dupri featuring Nelly, Ashanti, and Juicy J) | 2024 | — | — | — | — | — | — | — | — | — | — | | Non-album single |
| "Spin the Block" | 2025 | — | — | — | — | — | — | — | — | — | — | | Heartland 2.0 |
"—" denotes a recording that did not chart or was not released in that territory.

=== Promotional singles ===
List of promotional singles, with selected chart positions, showing year released and album name
| Title | Year | Peak chart positions | | Album |
| Title | Year | US | US R&B | Album |
|---|---|---|---|---|
| "Switch" (Ashanti featuring Nelly) | 2007 | — | — | Non-album singles |
| "Tippin' in da Club" | 2010 | — | 79 | Non-album singles |
| "Long Gone" (featuring Plies and Chris Brown) | 2010 | — (Note: "Long Gone" did not enter the Billboard Hot 100, but peaked at number 21 on the Bubbling Under Hot 100 Singles chart, which acts as an extension to the Hot 100.) | — (Note: "Long Gone" did not enter the Hot R&B/Hip-Hop Songs chart, but peaked at number 2 on the Bubbling Under R&B/Hip-Hop Singles chart, which acts as an extension to the Hot R&B/Hip-Hop Songs chart.) | 5.0 |
| "Die a Happy Man" (Originally recorded by Thomas Rhett) | 2016 | 83 | — | Non-album singles |
| "Sounds Good to Me" | 2017 | — | — | Non-album singles |
| "Cool Again" (Remix) (with Kane Brown) | 2020 | — | — | Non-album singles |
| "She Drives Me Crazy" (DND Remix) (Brett Kissel featuring Nelly) | 2020 | — | — | Non-album singles |
"—" denotes a recording that did not chart.

== Other charted and certified songs ==
List of songs, with selected chart positions, showing year released and album name
| Title | Year | Peak chart positions | | | | | Certifications | Album |
| Title | Year | US | US R&B | AUS | CAN | UK | Certifications | Album |
|---|---|---|---|---|---|---|---|---|
| "Luven Me" | 2000 | — | — | — | — | — | RMNZ: Platinum | Country Grammar |
| "Come Over" (Funkmaster Flex featuring Nelly) | 2000 | — | — (Note: "Come Over" did not enter the Hot R&B/Hip-Hop Songs chart, but peaked at number 21 on the Bubbling Under R&B/Hip-Hop Singles chart, which acts as an extension to the Hot R&B/Hip-Hop Songs chart.) | — | — | — | | The Mix Tape, Vol. IV |
| "Tip Drill" | 2003 | — | 65 | — | — | — | | Da Derrty Versions: The Reinvention |
| "In My Life" (featuring Avery Storm and Mase) | 2004 | — | — | — | — | — | RMNZ: Gold | Suit |
| "Girl Like U" (Snoop Dogg featuring Nelly) | 2004 | — | — (Note: "Girl Like U" did not enter the Hot R&B/Hip-Hop Songs chart, but peaked at number 15 on the Bubbling Under R&B/Hip-Hop Singles chart, which acts as an extension to the Hot R&B/Hip-Hop Songs chart.) | — | — | — | | R&G (Rhythm & Gangsta): The Masterpiece |
| "Get Loose" (T.I. featuring Nelly) | 2005 | — | 70 | — | — | — | | Urban Legend |
| "Kiss Kiss" (Remix) (Chris Brown featuring T-Pain and Nelly) | 2007 | — | — | — | — | — | BPI: Silver | Non-album single |
| "Liv Tonight" (featuring Keri Hilson) | 2010 | 75 | — | 39 | 74 | 54 | | 5.0 |
| "This Time of Night" (T.I. featuring Nelly) | 2012 | — | — | — | — | — | — | Fuck da City Up |
| "Marry Go Round" (featuring Chris Brown) | 2012 | — | — (Note: "Marry Go Round" did not enter the Hot R&B/Hip-Hop Songs chart, but peaked at number 1 on the Bubbling Under R&B/Hip-Hop Singles chart, which acts as an extension to the Hot R&B/Hip-Hop Songs chart.) | — | — | — | | Non-album single |
"—" denotes a recording that did not chart or was not released in that territory.

== Guest appearances ==
List of non-single guest appearances, with other performing artists, showing year released and album name
| Title | Year | Other artist(s) | Album |
|---|---|---|---|
| "Come Over" | 2000 | Funkmaster Flex | The Mix Tape, Vol. IV |
| "ATL 2 STL" | 2001 | Rasheeda | Dirty South |
| "Walk Away" | 2002 | Ali, Ms. Toi | Heavy Starch |
| "One of Those Days" (Remix) | 2002 | Whitney Houston | "One of Those Days" single |
| "Pump It Up" | 2003 | Missy Elliott | This Is Not a Test! |
| "This Goes Out" | 2003 | Murphy Lee, Roscoe, Cardan, Lil Jon, Lil Wayne | Murphy's Law |
| "On My Own" | 2003 | Freeway | Philadelphia Freeway |
| "Get Loose" | 2004 | T.I. | Urban Legend |
| "Girl Like U" | 2004 | Snoop Dogg | R&G (Rhythm & Gangsta): The Masterpiece |
| "My Boo" (Remix) | 2004 | Usher | none |
| "To the Floor" | 2005 | Mariah Carey | The Emancipation of Mimi |
| "Whip Yo Ass" | 2005 | WC | The Longest Yard soundtrack |
| "Datz on My Mama" | 2005 | Taylor Made | The Longest Yard soundtrack |
| "Baby" | 2006 | Pharrell | In My Mind |
| "Throw Some D's" (Remix) | 2007 | Rich Boy, André 3000, Jim Jones, Murphy Lee, The Game | Rich Boy |
| "Tryin' to Get a Number" | 2007 | R. Kelly | Double Up |
| "Show It to Me" | 2007 | T.I. | T.I. vs. T.I.P. |
| "Hood" | 2007 | Ali & Gipp, Pimp C | Kinfolk |
| "Lean'n" | 2007 | Ali & Gipp, Murphy Lee | Kinfolk |
| "All Night (Excuse Me)" | 2007 | Ali & Gipp, Avery Storm, Juvenile | Kinfolk |
| "Lose Control" | 2008 | Lloyd | Lessons in Love 2.0 |
| "What They Call Me" | 2009 | Bow Wow | New Jack City II |
| "Hot Damn" | 2009 | 2 Pistols | none |
| "Up & Down" | 2009 | Krave, Akon, Twista | none |
| "I'm Jackin'" (Remix) | 2009 | Ray Rizzy, Trina, Paul Wall, Gorilla Zoe, B.G. | none |
| "Letter" | 2009 | Razah | none |
| "Dis Man" | 2009 | Murphy Lee, Jermaine Dupri | I'm Free |
| "Say Sum Bout It" | 2009 | Ali | The Champ Iz Herr |
| "Bring the Money Out" | 2010 | DJ Khaled, Lil Boosie, Ace Hood, Schife | Victory |
| "NY Lover" | 2010 | Ashanti | none |
| "Supermodel" | 2010 | Avery Storm | none |
| "10+1" | 2010 | Avery Storm | none |
| "Y's" | 2010 | Chingy | none |
| "Hey Now" | 2010 | Chingy | none |
| "My Kinda Girl" | 2011 | Pitbull | Planet Pit |
| "I Just Wanna Fuck" | 2011 | Play-N-Skillz, Three 6 Mafia | Fireworks |
| "Kiss You" | 2011 | D. Brown | none |
| "Commander" (Urban Remix) | 2011 | Kelly Rowland | Here I Am |
| "Scarycat" | 2011 | Gucci Mane | none |
| "Racks" (Remix) | 2011 | YC, Young Jeezy, Wiz Khalifa, Cyhi the Prynce, Bun B, B.o.B, Yo Gotti, Wale, Cory Gunz, Ace Hood, Trae, Twista, Big Sean, Cory Mo, Waka Flocka Flame | none |
| "Bang Bang Pow Pow" (Remix) | 2012 | T-Pain, Lil Wayne | Revolver |
| "This Time of Night" | 2012 | T.I. | Fuck da City Up |
| "Trouble" (Remix) | 2012 | Bei Maejor, Wale, Trey Songz, T-Pain | none |
| "Do It Again" | 2012 | Lloyd | none |
| "MJ" | 2012 | B.o.B | Strange Clouds |
| "Do It" (Remix) | 2012 | Mykko Montana, Gucci Mane, Yo Gotti, Travis Porter, Jeremih, Nitti Beatz | none |
| "Before He Walked" | 2013 | Talib Kweli, Abby Dobson | Prisoner of Conscious |
| "4x4" | 2013 | Miley Cyrus | Bangerz |
| "Yellow" | 2017 | Aminé | Good For You |
| "Fully Loaded" | 2021 | Junior | none |
| "Mad Still" | 2023 | Coasta, Calboy | none |
| "On Errthang" | 2023 | NandoSTL | Year of the Ape |

== Music videos ==
=== As lead artist ===
List of music videos as lead artist, with directors, showing year released
| Title | Year | Director(s) |
|---|---|---|
| "Gimmie What U Got" (with St. Lunatics) | 1997 | none |
| "Country Grammar (Hot Shit)" | 2000 | Marc Klasfeld |
| "E.I." | 2000 | Little X |
| "Ride wit Me" (featuring City Spud) | 2001 | Marc Klasfeld |
| "Batter Up" (featuring St. Lunatics) | 2001 | Marc Klasfeld |
| "Midwest Swing" (with St. Lunatics) | 2001 | Marc Klasfeld |
| "Summer in the City" (with St. Lunatics) | 2001 | Marc Klasfeld |
| "#1" | 2002 | Steve Carr |
| "Hot in Herre" | 2002 | Director X, Katt Brown |
| "Hot in Herre" (version 2) | 2002 | Director X, Katt Brown |
| "Dilemma" (featuring Kelly Rowland) | 2002 | Benny Boom |
| "Air Force Ones" (featuring St. Lunatics) | 2002 | David Palmer |
| "Work It" (featuring Justin Timberlake) | 2003 | Joseph Kahn |
| "Pimp Juice" | 2003 | Benny Boom |
| "Shake Ya Tailfeather" (with P. Diddy and Murphy Lee) | 2003 | Benny Boom |
| "Iz U" | 2003 | Dave Meyers |
| "Tip Drill" (featuring St. Lunatics) | 2003 | none |
| "Flap Your Wings" | 2004 | Sun God Collection |
| "My Place" (featuring Jaheim) | 2004 | Benny Boom |
| "Tilt Ya Head Back" (featuring Christina Aguilera) | 2004 | Director X |
| "Over and Over" (featuring Tim McGraw) | 2004 | Erik White, Harvey White |
| "Na-NaNa-Na" (featuring Jazze Pha) | 2005 | Nelly, Emperor, Life Garland |
| "Errtime" (featuring Jung Tru and King Jacob) | 2005 | Benny Boom |
| "'N' Dey Say" | 2005 | Chris Robinson |
| "Grillz" (featuring Paul Wall and Ali & Gipp) | 2005 | Fat Cats |
| "Wadsyaname" | 2007 | Chris Robinson |
| "Party People" (featuring Fergie) | 2008 | Marc Webb |
| "Body on Me" (featuring Akon and Ashanti) | 2008 | Benny Boom |
| "Stepped on My J'z" (featuring Jermaine Dupri and Ciara) | 2008 | Benny Boom |
| "One and Only" | 2008 | Juwan Lee |
| "Let It Go (Lil Mama)" (featuring Pharrell) | 2008 | Fat Cats |
| "Just a Dream" | 2010 | Sanji |
| "Move That Body" (featuring T-Pain and Akon) | 2010 | Marc Klasfeld |
| "Gone" (featuring Kelly Rowland) | 2011 | Marc Klasfeld |
| "The Champ" | 2011 | Chris Mantzaris |
| "Country Ass Nigga" (featuring T.I. and 2 Chainz) | 2011 | G Visuals |
| "Hey Porsche" | 2013 | Ethan Lader |
| "Get Like Me" (featuring Nicki Minaj and Pharrell) | 2013 | Colin Tilley |
| "The Fix" (featuring Jeremih) | 2015 | Aristotle |

=== As featured performer ===
List of music videos as featured performer, with directors, showing year released
| Title | Year | Director(s) |
|---|---|---|
| "Where the Party At" (Jagged Edge featuring Nelly) | 2001 | Dave Meyers |
| "Girlfriend" (Remix) ('N Sync featuring Nelly) | 2002 | Marc Klasfeld |
| "All Night Long" (Brian McKnight featuring Nelly) | 2003 | Frank Sacramento |
| "Hold Up" (Murphy Lee featuring Nelly) | 2003 | King Kyjuan, Dana Christian |
| "Get It Poppin'" (Fat Joe featuring Nelly) | 2005 | Chris Robinson |
| "Nasty Girl" (The Notorious B.I.G. featuring Diddy, Nelly, Jagged Edge and Avery Storm) | 2005 | Sanaa Hamri |
| "Call on Me" (Janet Jackson featuring Nelly) | 2006 | Hype Williams |
| "N' Da Paint" (Ali & Gipp featuring Nelly) | 2007 | Fat Cats |
| "5000 Ones" (DJ Drama featuring Nelly, T.I., Diddy, Yung Joc, Jazze Pha, Willie the Kid, Young Jeezy and Twista) | 2007 | Dale Resteghini |
| "Here I Am" (Rick Ross featuring Nelly and Avery Storm) | 2008 | Gil Green, Rick Ross |
| "Miss Me" (Mohombi featuring Nelly) | 2010 | Dayo |
| "Lose Control" (Keri Hilson featuring Nelly) | 2011 | Colin Tilley |
| "Racks" (Remix) (YC featuring Nelly, B.o.B, Trae, Yo Gotti, Cyhi the Prynce, Dose and Ace Hood) | 2011 | Ian Wolfson |
| "Cruise" (Remix) (Florida Georgia Line featuring Nelly) | 2013 | Marc Klasfeld |
| "About That Life" (DJ Kay Slay featuring Fabolous, T-Pain, Rick Ross, Nelly and French Montana) | 2013 | Street Heat, Decatur Dan |
| "Until the Sun Comes Up" (Raghav featuring Abhishek Bachchan and Nelly) | 2015 | —N/a |
| "Millionaire" (Cash Cash and Digital Farm Animals featuring Nelly) | 2016 | Sesan Ogunro |
| "Cool Again" (Remix) (Kane Brown featuring Nelly) | 2020 | Alex Alvga |
