= Derrty Entertainment =

- Parent company: Universal
- Founded: 2003
- Founder: Nelly
- Distributor: Motown (United States)
- Genre: Hip hop
- Country of origin: United States
- Location: St. Louis, Missouri
- Official website: derrtyent.com

Derrty Entertainment is a record label founded by rapper Nelly in 2003. It operated as a division of Motown. Nelly's St. Lunatics cohort, Ali Jones served as president for the label, although it has lacked much activity. A namesake multimedia company—Derrty Ventures—was also co-formed by Nelly, Michael Chaffin and J Erving in 2017, which includes the clothing line Derrty Apparel.

== Well-known artists ==
=== Current ===
- Nelly (CEO)
- City Spud
- J-Kwon

=== Former ===
- Big Gipp

== Other ventures ==
In 2003, Nelly launched the women's fashion brand Apple Bottoms with Yomi Martin, Nick Loftis, and Ian Kelly, including clothing, perfume and accessories.

== Discography ==
Album Information
Nelly - Country Grammar
- Released: June 27, 2000
- Chart positions: No. 1 U.S Billboard 200
- RIAA Certification: Diamond
- U.S. sales: 10,000,000
- Singles: "Country Grammar (Hot Shit)", "Ride Wit Me", "E.I.", "Batter Up"
St. Lunatics - Free City
- Released: June 5, 2001
- Chart positions: No. 1 U.S Billboard 200
- RIAA Certification: platinum
- U.S. sales: 1,000,000
- Singles: "Midwest Swing", "Summer In The City", "Let Me In Now"
Ali - Heavy Starch
- Released: April 30, 2002
- Chart positions: No. 24 U.S Billboard 200
- RIAA Certification: -
- U.S. sales: -
- Singles: "Boughetto"
Nelly - Nellyville
- Released: June 25, 2002
- Chart positions: No. 1 U.S Billboard 200
- RIAA Certification: 6x multi-platinum
- U.S. sales: 6,000,000
- Singles: "Hot in Herre", "Pimp Juice", "Air Force Ones", "Dilemma", "Work It", "No. 1"
Murphy Lee - Murphy's Law
- Released: September 23, 2003
- Chart positions: No. 8 U.S Billboard 200
- RIAA Certification:platinum
- Singles: "Shake Ya Tailfeather", "Wat Da Hook Gon Be", "Hold Up", "Luv Me Baby"
Nelly - Sweat
- Released: September 14, 2004
- Chart positions: No. 2 U.S Billboard 200
- RIAA Certification: 2× platinum
- U.S. sales: 2,000,000
- Singles: "Na-NaNa-Na", "Flap Your Wings", "Tilt Ya Head Back"
Nelly - Suit
- Released: September 14, 2004
- Chart positions: No. 1 U.S Billboard 200
- RIAA Certification: 3x multi-platinum
- U.S. sales: 3,000,000
- Singles: "My Place", "'N' Dey Say", "Over and Over"
Ali & Gipp - Kinfolk
- Released: August 14, 2007
- Chart positions: No. 25 U.S Billboard 200
- RIAA Certification: -
- U.S. sales: -
- Singles: "Go 'Head", "Almost Made Ya", "N' Da Paint"
Nelly - Brass Knuckles
- Released: September 16, 2008
- Chart positions: No. 3 U.S Billboard 200
- RIAA Certification: Gold
- U.S. sales: 500,000
- Singles: "Party People", "Body On Me", "Stepped On My J'z", "One & Only"
Nelly - 5.0
- Released: November 16, 2010
- Chart positions: - No. 10 U.S Billboard 200
- RIAA Certification: -
- U.S. sales: 320,000
- Singles: "Just a Dream", "Move That Body", "Gone"
Nelly - M.O.
- Released: September 30, 2013
- Chart positions: - No. 14 U.S Billboard 200
- RIAA Certification: -
- U.S. sales: 23,000
- Singles: "Hey Porsche", "Get Like Me"

== See also ==
- Universal Records
- List of record labels
