= Jay E =

American record producer & DJ (born 1978)

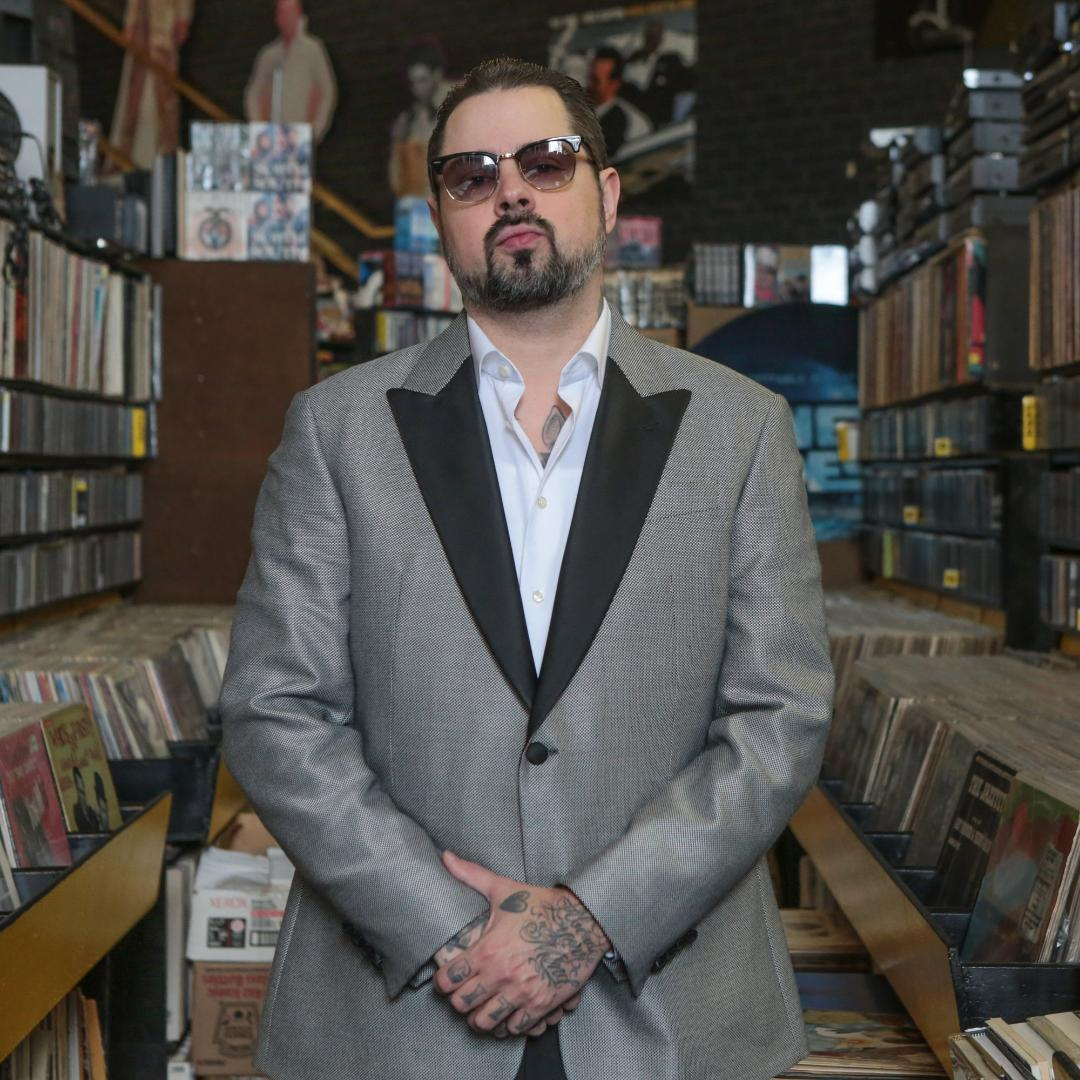
- Epperson in 2018

Background information
- Born: Jason Lee Epperson; August 13, 1978 (age 48); St. Louis, Missouri, U.S.
- Genres: Hip hop, pop, R&B
- Occupations: Record producer; songwriter; disc jockey; videographer
- Instruments: MPC 3000, synthesizers, samplers
- Years active: 1997–present

Jason Lee Epperson (born August 13, 1978) is an American record producer and DJ from St. Louis, Missouri. He first became known as the primary producer of hometown native Nelly's 2000 debut album Country Grammar, which received diamond certification by the Recording Industry Association of America (RIAA). Thereafter, he produced extensively for Nelly and his collaborators, and signed with his record label, Derrty Entertainment as in-house talent. He has since produced songs for other artists including Murphy Lee, St. Lunatics, Justin Timberlake, E-40, Cedric the Entertainer, Lil Wayne, Ron Isley, Three 6 Mafia, and Hilary Duff. Epperson's style is characterized by hip hop mixed with soul, R&B, and pop music. Billboard magazine, in its December 2000 issue, listed Epperson at number 16 on its "Top 100 Producers" list, as well as number 19 on its "Top 100 R&B/Hip Hop Producers of 2000" list. He has received a Grammy Award nomination.

== Early life ==
Jason Epperson was born on August 13, 1978, the first child of three. His mother was a stay-at-home mom. In the early '90s, he attended St. Charles West High School. He first took an interest in musical instruments at the age of 14, learning piano and light guitar. Having had an interest in becoming a DJ, he purchased his first turntable at the age of 15. It was an off-brand turntable and his first record was by KRS-One. He would go on to work and perfect his craft as a DJ. Some of his early influences were DJs such as Kid Capri and Jam Master Jay. Thereafter, he focused on his social life and entertainment for the remainder of his high school years. Jay would DJ for local house parties and would later land a job at a local St. Louis roller skating rink. His first shot at production was in Saints Studio in 1996; this is where he met future St. Lunatics member Ali who introduced him to the St. Lunatics.

== Music career ==
=== 1998: First release: Who's the Boss EP ===
The first release by the St. Lunatics was the 1997 single "Gimme What U Got", which was produced by Epperson and became the group's first local hit. The independent release brought forth a buzz which pushed Epperson to further continue his work with the group. The album of which it initially preceded, Who’s the Boss was eventually released as an extended play in 2004, originally intended for a release during the same year as the single. Epperson produced the EP in its entirety.

=== 2000: Country Grammar, Bait and The Original Kings of Comedy soundtracks, Rasheeda ===
While working at the roller rink as a DJ and with the St. Lunatics, Epperson began to develop a unique style of production. His first major placement was on St. Lunatic's member Nelly's first solo album, Country Grammar. It was released on June 27, 2000, by Universal Records. The production on the album was mainly handled by Epperson, with additional production by his company, Basement Beats, as well as C-Love, Kevin Law, City Spud, and Steve "Blast" Wills. The album brought forth a distinctive St. Louis Midwest swing. It supported four successful singles: "Country Grammar (Hot Shit)", "E.I.", "Ride wit Me" and "Batter Up". Its lead single, "Country Grammar (Hot Shit)", peaked at number 7 on both the Billboard Hot 100 and UK Singles Chart. "E.I." charted at number 16, number 12 and number 11 on the Hot 100, UK Singles Chart and ARIA Singles Chart, respectively. "Ride wit Me" peaked within the top five on the Hot 100, ARIA Singles Chart, Irish Singles Chart and UK Singles Chart.

Country Grammar received positive reviews and commercial success. It was at the top of the US Billboard 200 chart for five consecutive weeks and the US Top R&B/Hip-Hop Albums chart for six consecutive weeks. It also peaked in the top five on the New Zealand Albums Chart and Australian Albums Chart as well as the top ten on the Canadian Albums Chart and Dutch Albums Chart. The album was certified three times platinum by the Recording Industry Association of New Zealand (RIANZ) and Music Canada (MC), denoting shipments of 45,000 and 300,000 copies.

In 2016, it became the ninth hip hop album to become certified diamond by the Recording Industry Association of America (RIAA), denoting shipment of 10 million copies in the US. The success of this album made Epperson one of the top producers at the time. The songs "Ride with Me" and "Country Grammar" would receive Grammy Award nominations.

The song "Icey" featuring Nelly and the St. Lunatics was featured on the soundtrack to Bait, a 2000 action-comedy film. It was released on September 12, 2000, by Warner Bros. Records and featured a blend of hip hop and R&B music. The soundtrack reached #49 on the Top R&B/Hip-Hop Albums.

Professional ratings
Review scores
Source	Rating
Allmusic	link

The song "Summer in the City" features the St. Lunatics and Nelly on the soundtrack to the 2000 film The Original Kings of Comedy, released on August 22, 2000, through Universal Records. It mainly consisted of performances by the film's four stars, Steve Harvey, Bernie Mac, Cedric the Entertainer and D.L. Hughley, but five original music tracks also appeared. The soundtrack peaked at 50 on the Billboard 200 and 15 on the Top R&B/Hip-Hop Albums.

Professional ratings
Review scores
Source	Rating
Allmusic	link

Dirty South is the debut solo album by Rasheeda. The album was released in late March 2001 and peaked at number 77 on the Billboard Top R&B/Hip-Hop Albums chart. The track titled "ATL NO 2" was produced by Epperson.

=== 2001: Osmosis Jones soundtrack and Free City ===
Osmosis Jones: Music from the Motion Picture is the soundtrack to the 2001 film released on August 7, 2001, through Atlantic Records consisting of hip hop and contemporary R&B. Jay E produced the track "Summer in the City".

Professional ratings
Review scores
Source	Rating
Allmusic	link

Jay E co-produced Free City, an album which was dedicated for the release of St. Lunatics member, City. The album would debut at No. 3 on the Billboard 200 and was certified platinum by the RIAA a month later. The album would open up many doors for his new style of production.

=== 2002: O-Town, Nellyville, Heavy Starch ===
O2 is the second studio album by American boy band O-Town, following the success of their triple-platinum self-titled debut album. O2 peaked at #28 on the Billboard 200. The song "Favorite Girl" was produced by Jay E. The album charted on the U.S. Billboard 200.

With the success of the first two albums, Jay E would begin working on Nelly's second solo album, Nellyville. It was released on June 25, 2002, by Universal Records and the indie label Fo' Reel. The album includes production by Jay E, while additional production was provided by The Neptunes and Just Blaze. Nellyville peaked at number one on the US Billboard 200 selling 715,000 copies in its opening week. The album stayed atop the chart for four non-consecutive weeks and became certified six-times platinum by the Recording Industry Association of America (RIAA) for shipments of over six million copies, making this Jay E's second number-one album, second multi-platinum album, and second top ten in the United States. Internationally, Nellyville peaked at number 2 in Australia, Canada, Germany, New Zealand and the United Kingdom. As of March 16, 2011, the album had sold 6,488,000 copies in the United States, and it became the fourteenth best-selling rap album of all time.

Nellyville received generally positive reviews from music critics. At Metacritic, which assigns a normalized rating out of 100 to reviews from mainstream critics, the album received an average score of 70, based on 15 reviews, which indicates "generally favorable reviews.” The album was nominated for Favorite Pop/Rock Album and Favorite Hip/Hop/R&B Album and was ranked third on the Billboard 200 and the Top R&B/Hip Hop Albums charts.

The album debuted at #1 on the Billboard 200, selling 715,000 copies and outperforming Country Grammar (2000), which debuted at number 3 selling 235,000 copies. Within two weeks of its release, Nellyville remained atop the Billboard 200, selling 450,000 and 340,000 copies, respectively. The album surpassed 1.5 million copies in sales in its third week. In its fourth week, Nellyville was replaced atop the chart by Dave Matthews Band's Busted Stuff. The former album was positioned at #2 on the Billboard 200, with its sales decreasing to 305,000 copies. In the fifth week, it sold 271,000 copies, dropping from #2 to #3. On March 16, 2011, the album had sold 6,488,000 copies in the United States, becoming the fourteenth best-selling rap album of all time.

Nellyville debuted and peaked at #2 on UK Albums Chart on the week of July 13, 2002, remaining on the chart for 40 weeks. On July 1, 2002, the album was certified double platinum by the British Phonographic Industry (BPI), for shipments of 600,000 copies. On the Australian Albums Chart, it debuted and peaked at #2 for two weeks, staying within the top 10 for sixteen non-consecutive weeks. The album dropped off the chart after 31 weeks, and was certified triple platinum by the Australian Recording Industry Association (ARIA) for shipments of 210,000 copies. Nellyville also peaked at #2 on the New Zealand Albums Chart, Canadian Albums Chart and German Albums Chart. It remained on the chart in New Zealand for 30 weeks, in Canada for eighteen weeks and in Germany for 33 weeks. It was certified double and quadruple platinum by Recorded Music NZ and Music Canada. The album was certified gold by the Bundesverband Musikindustrie (BVMI). Nellyville also achieved success in several other territories, peaking within the top ten in Ireland. It was certified Gold by IFPI and certified platinum by IFPI Switzerland for shipments of 15,000 and 40,000 copies, respectively. The album reached number 11 in Sweden and #25 in Belgium (Wallonia) and France. The Swedish Recording Industry Association (GLF) awarded the album a gold certification, for shipments of over 30,000 copies.

Members of the St. Lunatics would begin to work on solo albums, on which they would utilize the production of their producer, Jay E. The album Heavy Starch by Ali would peak at #24 on the Billboard 200 and #7 on the Top Hip Hop/R&B Albums chart.

=== 2003: Murphy's Law ===
Murphy Lee would release his debut album Murphy's Law on September 23, 2003. It peaked at number 8 on the Billboard 200 chart and was certified gold on November 17, 2003. It featured the single from the Bad Boys II soundtrack, "Shake Your Tailfeather" (with Nelly and P. Diddy).

=== 2005: Coach Carter soundtrack and Sweat/Suit ===
Coach Carter: Music from the Motion Picture is the official soundtrack to the 2005 basketball film Coach Carter, released on January 11, 2005, under Capitol Records. It featured the track "Time", produced by Jay E and performed by St. Lunatics and Avery Storm.

Sweat is the third album by Nelly, intended to be released on August 17, 2004, before being delayed and released on September 13, 2004, by Universal Records. Production was handled by several producers, including Jay E, Midi Mafia, The Neptunes, Trife, Jazze Pha, Doe and The Alchemist. Released in conjunction with Suit, Nelly intended to release a single album before conceptualizing and releasing two albums simultaneously, both which would contrast each other's themes. Nelly characterized Sweat as "more uptempo" and "energetic" while describing Suit as more of "a grown-up and sexy vibe [...] more melodic".

=== 2007: The Real Testament ===
The Real Testament is the major-label debut album by rapper Plies. It was released on August 7, 2007, and the album was well received by music critics. The song "You" featuring Tank, was produced by Jay E.

AllMusic editor David Jeffries said that the album had a few "redundant tracks and some potential unreached", but praised both studio and street tracks being supported by capable producers and guest artists throughout. He concluding with, "An energetic artist with little refinement, Plies puts his rough edges to good use on 'The Real Testament', an exciting, sometimes promising, debut." Steve 'Flash' Juon of RapReviews spoke about the record: "In lesser hands this would have been one of a hundred no-name rap albums that end up in your local store's bargain bin but thanks to good beats and well-chosen singles in 'The Real Testament', Plies makes a favorable impression both on radio and his CD."

The Real Testament sold 96,000 copies in its first week of release, debuting at number two on the Billboard 200. The following week, the album dropped seven spots to number nine. In its third week, the album sold 27,000 copies, dropping from number 9 to 21. As of June 1, 2008, The Real Testament had been certified gold by the Recording Industry Association of America.

=== 2008: Randy Jackson's Music Club, Vol. 1 and Greatest Remixes ===
Jay E would team up with Randy Jackson on Music Club, Vol. 1, on the track "Just Walk on By", featuring Joss Stone. This was the debut studio album by Jackson, released on March 11, 2008.

Greatest Remixes is a greatest hits compilation album of dance remixes of the original songs by Good Charlotte, with co-production by Jay E. The compilation was released on November 25, 2008. The track listing includes songs from all four Good Charlotte studio albums and three unreleased songs, "Anxiety", "Fight Song" (remixed by Jay) and "War".

== Other ventures ==
He is a co-founder of the production team Basement Beats.

Jason Lee Epperson's daughter, Jaysha Marie Epperson was born in 2002, in St. Louis, MO.

== Discography ==
Albums credits

- Country Grammar (2000)
- Nellyville (2002)
- Heavy Starch (2002)
- Da Derrty Versions: The Reinvention (2003)
- Murphy's Law (2003)
- Sweat / Suit (2004)
- Who's the Boss (2004)

== Awards and honors ==
- Nelly – Country Grammar 10 million copies sold
- ASCAP Pop 2002 Award – "Ride wit Me"
- ASCAP Pop 2002 Award – "Country Grammar"
- ASCAP Rhythm and Soul 2001 Award – "Country Grammar"
- Grammy nomination - Nellyville, Album of the Year
- Avenged Sevenfold (self–titled) – gold
- Nelly (Sweat) – platinum
- Nelly (Nellyville) – 8 million
- Nelly (Da Derrty Versions) – gold
- Murphy Lee (Murphy's Law) – gold
- St. Lunatics (Free City) – platinum
- Plies (The Real Testament) – gold
- Screenwerks – Alive Magazine, Best Video DJs
