= Da Derrty Versions: The Reinvention =

Remix album by Nelly
- Released: November 25, 2003
- Recorded: 2002–03
- Genre: Hip hop
- Length: 77:53
- Label: Universal
- Producer: Nelly

Nelly chronology
Nellyville (2002)	Da Derrty Versions: The Reinvention (2003)	Sweat (2004)

Professional ratings
Review scores
Source	Rating
Allmusic	link
RapReviews	link

Da Derrty Versions: The Reinvention is a remix album by American rapper Nelly, released on November 25, 2003.

== Track listing ==
1. "Intro" (1:25)
2. "Country Grammar (Jason "Jay E" Epperson Remix)" (featuring E-40) (4:59)
3. "Iz U" (5:41)
4. "E.I. (David Banner Remix)" (5:03)
5. "Ride wit Me (Jason "Jay E" Epperson Remix)" (featuring City Spud) (4:28)
6. "Batter Up (Jason "Jay E" Epperson Remix)" (featuring Murphy Lee, Ali, Chocolate Tai, King Jacob, Prentiss Church & Jung Tru) (6:57)
7. "If" (3:40)
8. "Hot in Herre (Basement Beats Remix)" (3:45)
9. "Dilemma (Jermaine Dupri Remix)" (featuring Kelly Rowland & Ali) (5:06)
10. "King's Highway" (5:31)
11. "Groovin' Tonight" (featuring Brian McKnight, Ali & City Spud) (4:26)
12. "Air Force Ones (David Banner Remix)" (featuring David Banner & 8Ball) (5:10)
13. "Work It (Scott Storch Remix)" (featuring Justin Timberlake) (4:12)
14. "#1 (Remix)" (featuring Clipse & Postaboy) (5:07)
15. "Pimp Juice (Jason "Jay E" Epperson Remix)" (featuring Ron Isley) (6:00)
16. "Tip Drill Remix" (E.I.) (featuring St. Lunatics) (removed in the clean version) (6:23)

== Charts ==
=== Weekly charts ===
Chart (2003)	Peak position
Australian Albums (ARIA)	91
German Albums (Offizielle Top 100)	85
Japanese Albums (Oricon)	29
Swiss Albums (Schweizer Hitparade)	91
UK Albums (OCC)	94
UK R&B Albums (OCC)	25
US Billboard 200	12
US Top R&B/Hip-Hop Albums (Billboard)	6

=== Year-end charts ===
Chart (2004)	Position
US Billboard 200	82
US Top R&B/Hip-Hop Albums (Billboard)	58

== Certifications ==
Region	Certification	Certified units/sales
United Kingdom (BPI)	Silver	60,000^{‡}
^{‡} Sales+streaming figures based on certification alone.
