= Nellyville =

Studio album by Nelly
- Released: June 25, 2002
- Genres: Southern hip-hop; pop rap
- Length: 79:40
- Labels: Fo' Reel; Universal
- Producers: Waiel Yaghnam; The Neptunes; Jay E; Trackboyz; Bam; Ryan Bowser; Just Blaze

Nelly chronology
Country Grammar (2000)	Nellyville (2002)	Sweat (2004)

Singles from Nellyville
- 1. "Hot in Herre" Released: May 7, 2002; 2. "Dilemma" Released: June 25, 2002; 3. "Air Force Ones" Released: November 4, 2002; 4. "Work It" Released: February 24, 2003; 5. "Pimp Juice" Released: March 10, 2003

Nellyville is the second studio album by American rapper Nelly. It was released on June 25, 2002, by Universal Records and Fo' Reel Entertainment. The album's production was handled by Waiel Yaghnam, the Neptunes, Jay E, Trackboyz, Ryan Bowser, and Just Blaze. Two singles from Nellyville, "Hot in Herre" and "Dilemma", both topped the US Billboard Hot 100 for respectively seven and ten weeks. The album received generally favorable reviews from music critics, who praised the production.

Nellyville debuted at the top of the US Billboard 200, with sales of 715,000 copies in the opening week of the country. It remained at number one for four non-consecutive weeks and was eventually certified six-times platinum by the Recording Industry Association of America (RIAA) for shipments of over six million equivalent-units in sales, which allowed Nellyville to become Nelly's second number-one, multi-platinum, and top-10 album in the United States following his debut album Country Grammar in 2000. As of March 16, 2011, Nellyville sold 6,488,000 copies in the United States, and it became the 14th best-selling rap album of all time. Internationally, it peaked at number two on the album charts in the United Kingdom, Australia, Canada, Germany, and New Zealand.

== Production ==
The recording of Nellyville was handled by Steve Eigner and Marc Lee. Rich Travali was assisted by Jeff Robinette, while Jamie Duncan and Dan Milazzo were performing the mixing on the album. Audio mastering was done by Herb Powers. The album's artwork was provided by Sandy Brummels, while Robert Sims handled design, and Jonathan Mannion was responsible for photography. Several artists made an appearance on the album, including Justin Timberlake, Kelly Rowland, Beanie Sigel, Freeway and Dani Stevenson.

== Critical reception ==
Professional ratings
Aggregate scores
Source	Rating
Metacritic	70/100
Review scores
Source	Rating
AllMusic	3.5/5 stars
Blender	3/5 stars
Entertainment Weekly	B+
The Guardian	4/5 stars
Los Angeles Times	3/4 stars
NME	3.5/5 stars
Q	4/5 stars
Rolling Stone	3/5 stars
Spin	6/10
USA Today	2.5/4 stars

Nellyville received generally positive reviews from music critics. At Metacritic, which assigns a normalized rating out of 100 to reviews from mainstream critics, the album has received an average score of 70, based on 15 reviews, which indicates "generally favorable reviews". Wayne Franklin of PopMatters held low expectations for the album prior to listening to it, following Nelly's feud with rapper KRS-One, but found its music to be "incredible". Wayne lauded the track "Air Force Ones", describing it as an "unbelievable ode" to hip-hop, while noting several other songs as stand-outs. AllMusic's Jason Birchmeier gave the album three-and-a-half stars out of five, noting "Hot in Herre", "Dilemma" and "Roc the Mic" as "three well-calculated, standout moments". Birchmeier praised "Hot in Herre"'s production, "Roc the Mic"'s hip-hop composition and the "Dilemma"'s interpolation of Patti LaBelle's "Love, Need and Want You". RapReviews.com's Steve Juon gave Nellyville an 8.5 out of ten, citing the album's consistency and production, praising "Hot in Herre" for its Midwestern drawl and "harmonious musical flow". Giving the album a B+, Tom Sinclair of Entertainment Weekly praised several new additions to Nelly's vocal style, summarizing: "If you like your rap loose and funny, Nelly's the man for you".

NME's Dele Fadele saw Nellyville as Nelly's "reply to the haters"; Fadele described the album as a "glossy, well-produced album of populist anthems with a gangsta undertow" that expands his perspective of the world and "celebrates success". Though Fadele wasn't impressed at the Justin Timberlake featured track "Work It", calling the song a "silly pop-directed collaboration". The A.V. Club's Nathan Rabin praised Nellyville for achieving similar universal appeal to Nelly's previous effort , Country Grammar, which achieved it with songs such as its self-titled track and "E.I.". Rabin criticized Timberlake's "high-schooler doing a Bee Gees impersonation" on "Work It", though noted the song as the only "glaring misstep" on the album. People lauded "Hot in Herre" for its "funky go-go groove", declaring it the "perfect summer jam", but were ambivalent towards the rest of the album's beats for being slightly repetitive. Rolling Stone's Rob Marriott described Nelly as a "gifted, witty MC" with the "catchiest rhymes to ever hit the pop charts" but wrote that Nellyville sounds "weighted down" by the commercial pressure of having to have another multi-platinum album.

=== Accolades ===
At the 45th Annual Grammy Awards, Nellyville was nominated for Album of the Year and Best Rap Album, "Dilemma" won Best Rap/Sung Collaboration and was nominated for Record of the Year, and "Hot in Herre" won Best Male Rap Solo Performance. Nelly received three BET Award nominations such as Best Male Hip-Hop Artist, Best Collaboration (for "Dilemma") and Video of the Year (for "Hot in Herre"). At the 2003's American Music Awards, Nelly was nominated for Favorite Pop/Rock Male Artist and the Fan's Choice Award, while Nellyville was nominated for Favorite Pop/Rock Album and Favorite Hip/Hop/R&B Album, with Nelly winning the Fan's Choice Award. Nelly received six awards at the 2002's Billboard Music Awards, winning the awards for Artist of the Year, Male Artist of the Year, Hot 100 Singles Male Artist of the Year, R&B/Hip-Hop Male Artist of the Year, Rap Artist of the Year and Rap Track of the Year (for "Hot in Herre"). On the 2002's Billboard year-end charts, the album was ranked third on the Billboard 200 and the Top R&B/Hip Hop Albums charts.

== Commercial performance ==
=== North America ===
The album debuted at No. 1 on the US Billboard 200, selling 715,000 copies, outperforming Nelly's previous effort Country Grammar (2000), which debuted at number 3 selling 235,000 copies. With the single, "Hot in Herre" debuting at No. 1 on the US Billboard Hot 100 that week, Nelly was in possession of the top spot on 10 different Billboard charts. After its release, Nellyville remained atop the Billboard 200, selling 447,000 in its second week and 340,000 in its third week, surpassing 1.5 million copies in sales in its 3rd week. In its fourth week, Nellyville replaced atop the chart by Dave Matthews Band's Busted Stuff. The former album was positioned at No. 2 on the Billboard 200, with its sales decreasing to 305,000 copies. In the 5th week, it sold 271,000 copies, dropping from #2 to No. 3, and in its sixth week, it sold 244,000 copies remaining at number 3. Nellyville reached to No. 2 and sold 210,000 units in its 7th week of release and in its 8th week, topping the Billboard 200, accumulating to 4 non-consecutive weeks atop. The album sold 185,000 copies that week. Nellyville's 4-week #1 run and sales were, according to Billboard, largely in part to the success of the album's singles, "Hot in Herre" and "Dilemma". The former track was number one on the Hot 100 prior to the album's release, maintaining a third week atop the chart, when Nellville made its debut. The song topped the Hot 100 for 7 consecutive weeks before being replaced by its successor, "Dilemma", which topped the chart for 10 non-consecutive weeks, selling worldwide over 7.6 million copies. On June 9, 2003, Nellyville was certified Sex-tuple Platinum by the Recording Industry Association of America (RIAA) for shipments of over 6 million copies in the United States of America. On March 16, 2011, the album sold 6,490,000 copies in the United States, becoming the fourteenth best-selling rap album of all time. Nellyville was ranked as the 174th best album of all time on the Billboard Top 200 Albums of All Time.

=== Europe and Oceania ===
Nellyville debuted and peaked at No. 2 on the UK Albums Chart on the week of July 13, 2002, remaining on the chart for 40 weeks. On July 1, 2002, the album was certified Double Platinum by the British Phonographic Industry (BPI), for shipments of 600,000 copies. On the Australian Albums Chart, it debuted and peaked at No. 2 for two weeks, staying within the top 10 for 16 non-consecutive weeks. The album dropped off the chart after 31 weeks, and was certified Triple Platinum by the Australian Recording Industry Association (ARIA) for shipments of 210,000 copies. Nellyville also peaked at No. 2 on the New Zealand Albums Chart, Canadian Albums Chart and German Albums Chart. It remained on the chart in New Zealand for 30 weeks, in Canada for 18 weeks and in Germany for 33 weeks. It was certified Double Platinum by Recorded Music NZ and Quadruple Platinum by Music Canada. the album was certified Gold by the Bundesverband Musikindustrie (BVMI). Nellyville also achieved success in several other territories, peaking within the top ten in Ireland, Netherlands, Denmark, Finland, Switzerland, Norway, Austria and Belgian (Flanders). It was certified Gold by IFPI Austria for shipments of 15,000 and certified Platinum by IFPI Switzerland for shipments of 40,000 copies The album reached number 11 in Sweden and #25 in Belgium (Wallonia) and France. The Swedish Recording Industry Association (GLF) awarded the album a Gold certification, for shipments of over 30,000 copies.

== Track listing ==
No.	Title	Writer(s)	Producer(s)	Length
1.	"Nellyville"	Cornell Haynes, Jr.; Waiel Yaghnam	Yaghnam	4:15
2.	"Gettin' It Started (skit)" (featuring Cedric the Entertainer and La La)		Nelly	1:51
3.	"Hot in Herre"	Haynes, Jr.; Chad Hugo; Pharrell Williams; Charles Brown	The Neptunes	3:48
4.	"Dem Boyz" (featuring Kyjuan and Murphy Lee)	Haynes, Jr.; Robert "Kyjuan" Cleveland; Torhi Harper; Jason "Jay E" Epperson	Jay E	4:34
5.	"Oh Nelly" (featuring Murphy Lee)	Haynes, Jr.; Harper; Epperson	Jay E	4:03
6.	"Pimp Juice"	Haynes, Jr.; Epperson	Jay E	4:52
7.	"Air Force Ones" (featuring Kyjuan, Ali, and Murphy Lee)	Haynes, Jr.; Cleveland; Ali Jones; Harper; Mark Williams; Joe Kent	Trackboyz	5:04
8.	"In the Store (skit)" (featuring Cedric the Entertainer and La La)		Nelly	1:40
9.	"On the Grind" (featuring King Jacob)	Haynes, Jr.; Jacob "King Jacob" Thomas; Epperson	Jay E	4:46
10.	"Dilemma" (featuring Kelly Rowland)	Haynes, Jr.; Kelly Rowland; Ryan Bowser; Walter Sigler; Kenny Gamble	Bowser	4:49
11.	"Splurge"	Haynes, Jr.; Epperson	Jay E	5:09
12.	"Work It" (featuring Justin Timberlake)	Haynes, Jr.; Justin Timberlake; Epperson	Jay E	4:23
13.	"Roc the Mic (Remix)" (performed by Beanie Sigel and Freeway featuring Nelly and Murphy Lee)	Dwight Grant; Leslie Pridgen; Haynes, Jr.; Harper; Justin Smith	Just Blaze	4:18
14.	"The Gank"	Haynes, Jr.; Yaghnam	Yaghnam	4:49
15.	"5000 (skit)"	Haynes, Jr.	Nelly	2:11
16.	"#1"	Haynes, Jr.; Yaghnam	Yaghnam	3:19
17.	"CG 2" (featuring Kyjuan and Murphy Lee)	Haynes, Jr.; Cleveland; Harper; Epperson	Jay E	4:32
18.	"Say Now"	Haynes, Jr.; Epperson	Jay E	5:42
19.	"Fuck It Then (skit)" (featuring Cedric the Entertainer and La La)		Nelly	1:39
Total length:				79:40

United Kingdom bonus tracks
No.	Title	Writer(s)	Producer(s)	Length
20.	"Stick Out Ya Wrist" (featuring Toya)	Haynes, Jr.; Toya Rodriguez; Epperson	Jay E	3:50
21.	"Not in My House"	Haynes, Jr.; Epperson	Jay E	3:00
Total length:				86:30

2022 digital deluxe edition bonus tracks
No.	Title	Length
22.	"Work It (Copenhaniacs Remix)"	3:48
23.	"Hot in Herre (Corporate Remix)"	3:33
24.	"Hot in Herre (Maximum Risk Remix)"	3:51
25.	"Hot in Herre (X-Ecutioners Remix)"	3:58
Total length:		1:42:10

Sample credits

- "Hot in Herre" contains an interpolation of "Bustin' Loose", as performed by Chuck Brown.
- "Pimp Juice" contains a sample from the medley of "Love Comes in All Colors", as performed by the Staple Singers.
- "Dilemma" contains elements of "Love, Need and Want You", as performed by Patti LaBelle, and samples “Misunderstanding”, as performed by D Train, “BMW", as performed by Phemza the Kween, and "R&B", as performed by Lil Swae.

== Personnel ==
Credits adapted from liner notes.

Main artist

- Nelly

Additional musicians

- Justin Timberlake – appearance
- Kelly Rowland – appearance
- Beanie Sigel – appearance
- Freeway – appearance
- Dani Stevenson – appearance

Technical

- Steve Eigner – recording
- Marc Lee – recording, assistance
- Rich Travali – mixing
- Jeff Robinette – mixing, assistance
- Jamie Duncan – mixing, assistance
- Dan Milazzo – mixing, assistance
- Herb Powers – mastering

Other

- Sandy Brummels – art directing
- Robert Sims – design
- Jonathan Mannion – photography

== Charts ==
=== Weekly charts ===
Weekly chart performance for Nellyville
Chart (2002)	Peak position
Australian Albums (ARIA)	2
Australian Urban Albums (ARIA)	1
Austrian Albums (Ö3 Austria)	9
Belgian Albums (Ultratop Flanders)	10
Belgian Albums (Ultratop Wallonia)	25
Canadian Albums (Billboard)	2
Canadian R&B Albums (Nielsen SoundScan)	2
Danish Albums (Hitlisten)	6
Dutch Albums (Album Top 100)	4
European Albums (Billboard)	3
Finnish Albums (Suomen virallinen lista)	6
French Albums (SNEP)	25
German Albums (Offizielle Top 100)	2
Irish Albums (IRMA)	3
Italian Albums (FIMI)	25
Japanese Albums (Oricon)	28
New Zealand Albums (RMNZ)	2
Norwegian Albums (VG-lista)	9
Polish Albums (ZPAV)	7
Portuguese Albums (AFP)	8
Scottish Albums (Official Charts)	8
Swedish Albums (Sverigetopplistan)	11
Swiss Albums (Schweizer Hitparade)	6
UK Albums (Official Charts)	2
UK R&B Albums (Official Charts)	1
US Billboard 200	1
US Top R&B/Hip-Hop Albums (Billboard)	1

=== Year-end charts ===
Year-end chart performance for Nellyville in 2002
Chart (2002)	Position
Australian Albums (ARIA)	11
Austrian Albums (Ö3 Austria)	49
Belgian Albums (Ultratop Flanders)	24
Belgian Albums (Ultratop Wallonia)	83
Canadian Albums (Nielsen SoundScan)	9
Canadian R&B Albums (Nielsen SoundScan)	3
Canadian Rap Albums (Nielsen SoundScan)	3
Dutch Albums (Album Top 100)	22
French Albums (SNEP)	112
German Albums (Offizielle Top 100)	22
New Zealand Albums (RMNZ)	9
Swiss Albums (Schweizer Hitparade)	23
UK Albums (OCC)	22
US Billboard 200	3
US Top R&B/Hip Hop Albums (Billboard)	3
Worldwide Albums (IFPI)	6

Year-end chart performance for Nellyville in 2003
Chart (2003)	Position
US Billboard 200	24
US Top R&B/Hip-Hop Albums (Billboard)	28

== Certifications ==
Certifications and sales for Nellyville
Region	Certification	Certified units/sales
Australia (ARIA)	3× Platinum	210,000^{^}
Austria (IFPI Austria)	Gold	15,000^{*}
Canada (Music Canada)	4× Platinum	400,000^{^}
Denmark (IFPI Danmark)	Gold	25,000^{^}
Finland (Musiikkituottajat)	Gold	17,292
Germany (BVMI)	Gold	150,000^{^}
Japan (RIAJ)	Platinum	200,000^{^}
Netherlands (NVPI)	Gold	40,000^{^}
New Zealand (RMNZ)	2× Platinum	30,000^{^}
Norway (IFPI Norway)	Gold	25,000^{*}
Sweden (GLF)	Gold	30,000^{^}
Switzerland (IFPI Switzerland)	Platinum	40,000^{^}
United Kingdom (BPI)	2× Platinum	769,000
United States (RIAA)	7× Platinum	7,000,000^{‡}
Summaries
Europe (IFPI)	Platinum	1,000,000^{*}
^{*} Sales figures based on certification alone.^{^} Shipments figures based on certification alone.^{‡} Sales+streaming figures based on certification alone.

== See also ==
- List of number-one albums of 2002 (U.S.)
- List of number-one R&B albums of 2002 (U.S.)
