= Shake Your Tailfeather =

Shake Your Tailfeather may refer to:

- "Shake Ya Tailfeather", a song by American rappers Nelly, P. Diddy, and Murphy Lee
- "Shake a Tail Feather", a song written by Otha Hayes, Verlie Rice, and Andre Williams
