= Flap Your Wings (song) =

Single by Nelly

from the album Sweat
- A-side: "My Place"
- Released: July 3, 2004
- Recorded: 2003
- Genre: Hip-hop
- Length: 4:03
- Label: Universal
- Songwriters: Cornell Haynes; Pharrell Williams; Charles Hugo
- Producer: The Neptunes

Nelly singles chronology
"Iz U" (2003)	"Flap Your Wings" (2004)	"My Place" (2004)

"Flap Your Wings" is a single by rapper Nelly, released on July 3, 2004, from the album Sweat. It was released as a double A-side with "My Place" in the UK, Ireland, Australia, and New Zealand.

== Music video ==
The music video was directed by Director X. The music video starts with Nelly in a car with rapper Ali, singing along to "Down In Da Water". He arrives at a cave, and walks through, as the music starts to play. It continues with Nelly rapping, and many girls dancing around him. The final scene shows the storyline will continue for the "My Place" music video. The video vixens featured were Jeannette Chaves, Chessika Cartwright, Natasha Ellie, and Tyeshia Robinson. Robinson was also featured in the "My Place" video as video lead.

== Charts ==
=== Weekly charts ===
Chart (2004)	Peak position
Australian Urban (ARIA) With "My Place"	1
Scotland Singles (OCC) With "My Place"	4
UK Singles (OCC) With "My Place"	1
UK Hip Hop/R&B (OCC) With "My Place"	1
US Billboard Hot 100	52
US Hot R&B/Hip-Hop Songs (Billboard)	18

=== Year-end charts ===
Chart (2004)	Position
UK Urban (Music Week) "Flap Your Wings" / "My Place"	15
US Hot R&B/Hip-Hop Songs (Billboard)	95

== Certifications ==
Region	Certification	Certified units/sales
Australia (ARIA)	Platinum	70,000^{^}
New Zealand (RMNZ)	Gold	5,000^{*}
United Kingdom (BPI)	Silver	200,000^{*}
United States (RIAA)	Gold	500,000^{*}
^{*} Sales figures based on certification alone.^{^} Shipments figures based on certification alone.

== Release history ==
Region	Date	Format(s)	Label(s)	Ref.
United States	August 16, 2004	Contemporary hit · rhythmic contemporary radio	Derrty, Fo' Reel, Universal	
