= The Original Kings of Comedy (soundtrack) =

Soundtrack album by Various artists
- Released: August 22, 2000
- Recorded: 2000
- Genre: Comedy, hip hop
- Length: 62:56
- Label: Universal

Professional ratings
Review scores
Source	Rating
AllMusic	2.5/5 stars

The Original Kings of Comedy is the soundtrack to the 2000 film, The Original Kings of Comedy. It was released on August 22, 2000, through Universal Records and mainly consisted of performances by the movie's four stars, Steve Harvey, Bernie Mac, Cedric the Entertainer and D.L. Hughley, but five original music tracks also appeared. The soundtrack peaked at No. 50 on the Billboard 200 and No. 15 on the Top R&B/Hip-Hop Albums chart.

== Track listing ==
1. "Summer in the City" – 4:36 (St. Lunatics & Nelly)
2. "Something's Got to Be Wrong in Cuba" – 1:59 (Steve Harvey)
3. "Titanic" – :56 (Steve Harvey)
4. "Church All the Time" – 7:16 (Steve Harvey)
5. "#1 Stunna" – 4:43 (Big Tymers)
6. "Indecent Proposal" – :33 (D. L. Hughley)
7. "Section 8 Island" – :32 (D. L. Hughley)
8. "Time Out" – :17 (D. L. Hughley)
9. "Big Momma" – 1:40 (D. L. Hughley)
10. "Airplanes" – :27 (D. L. Hughley)
11. "The Dysfunctional Black Family" – 1:05 (D. L. Hughley)
12. "I'll Eat Anything" – :52 (D. L. Hughley)
13. "I Love My Job" – 1:23 (D. L. Hughley)
14. "Jesus Was Black" – :38 (D. L. Hughley)
15. "Racists" – 1:08 (D. L. Hughley)
16. "What Blacks Do for Excitment" – 1:12 (D. L. Hughley)
17. "Ghetto" – 3:28 (Sticky Fingaz & Petey Pablo)
18. "Delicious" – 1:00 (Cedric the Entertainer)
19. "We Run" – 2:12 (Cedric the Entertainer)
20. "Ain't You Big Poppa" – 1:38 (Cedric the Entertainer)
21. "The Post Tiger Renaissance" – 4:06 (Cedric the Entertainer)
22. "Na Na" – 4:28 (Monifah & Chico DeBarge)
23. "I Say What You Scared to Say" – 1:06 (Bernie Mac)
24. "My Sister's Kids" – 8:38 (Bernie Mac)
25. "Motherfuckers" – 2:43 (Bernie Mac)
26. "What's Up Wit That" – 4:20 (Juvenile, Lil Wayne & Big Tymers)
