= Air Force Ones (song) =

2002 single by Nelly

Single by Nelly featuring Kyjuan, Ali and Murphy Lee

from the album Nellyville
- Released: November 4, 2002
- Length: 5:04 (album version); 4:31 (radio edit)
- Label: Universal
- Songwriters: Nelly, Murphy Lee, Ali, Kyjuan
- Producer: Trackboyz

Nelly singles chronology
"Dilemma" (2002)	"Air Force Ones" (2002)	"Work It" (2003)

"Air Force Ones" is a song by American rapper Nelly, from his 2002 second album Nellyville. It was released on November 4, 2002, and features fellow St. Lunatics rappers Kyjuan, Ali and Murphy Lee. The song was the third top-five hit from Nellyville on the US Billboard Hot 100 chart, peaking at number three. Its video, whose exteriors were shot at the SE corner of Delmar and Westgate in University City, Missouri, featured St. Louis professional athletes Marshall Faulk, Torry Holt, D'Marco Farr, Ray Lankford, and Ozzie Smith, and hip hop artists Big Tymers and WC.

== Meaning ==
The Nike Air Force 1 is a type of shoe. In the song, Nelly and the St. Lunatics each brag about their usage and opinions of the shoes.

== Remix ==
The official remix was included on Nelly's 2003 remix album Da Derrty Versions: The Reinvention and David Banner's 2003 album MTA2: Baptized in Dirty Water. It features the St. Lunatics on the first part of the chorus, David Banner, and 8Ball. David Banner is also the producer of the remix.

== Track listing ==
- US 12-inch single (double A-side with "Dilemma")
1. "Dilemma" (clean) – 4:49
2. "Dilemma" (dirty) – 4:49
3. "Dilemma" (instrumental) – 4:49
4. "Air Force Ones" (clean) – 5:04
5. "Air Force Ones" (dirty) – 5:04
6. "Air Force Ones" (instrumental) – 5:04

== Charts ==
=== Weekly charts ===
Chart (2002–2003)	Peak position
US Billboard Hot 100	3
US Hot R&B/Hip-Hop Songs (Billboard)	4
US Hot Rap Songs (Billboard)	1
US Pop Airplay (Billboard)	10
US Rhythmic Airplay (Billboard)	2

=== Year-end charts ===
Chart (2003)	Position
US Billboard Hot 100	40
US Hot R&B/Hip-Hop Singles & Tracks (Billboard)	39
US Hot Rap Tracks (Billboard)	15
US Mainstream Top 40 (Billboard)	51
US Rhythmic Top 40 (Billboard)	24

== Certifications ==
Region	Certification	Certified units/sales
New Zealand (RMNZ)	Gold	15,000^{‡}
^{‡} Sales+streaming figures based on certification alone.

== Release history ==
Region	Date	Format(s)	Label(s)	Ref.
United States	November 4, 2002	Contemporary hit; rhythmic contemporary; urban contemporary radio	Fo' Reel; Universal	
