= Iz U =

Single by Nelly

from the album Da Derrty Versions: The Reinvention
- Released: December 9, 2003
- Genre: Hip hop
- Length: 5:39 (main version); 4:21 (radio version)
- Label: Universal
- Songwriters: Alan Tew; Cornell Haynes; Jason Epperson

Nelly singles chronology
"Shake Ya Tailfeather" (2003)	"Iz U" (2003)	"Flap Your Wings" (2004)

"Iz U" is a song by the rapper Nelly, released in 2003 as a single from the album Da Derrty Versions: The Reinvention. It was released in the United States but had little airplay. It also saw moderate success in the United Kingdom, peaking at number 36. The song was also used for the film, The Haunted Mansion.

The song is notable for its sampling of "The People's Court" theme song. The instrumental track was originally used on "Put Your Hands Up", a B-side to his single "Work It" featuring Justin Timberlake.

== Music video ==
Similar to the film The Haunted Mansion, Nelly inherits a mansion from his recently deceased uncle and throws a house party. However, his guests soon start falling victim to the haunting of the house. Nelly soon confronts the evil spirit causing it all (also played by him) and defeats it by throwing an enchanted orb he received from a zombie at it. The evil spirit is destroyed and all the ghosts of the mansion are free.

== Track listing ==
US single

1. "Iz U" [Radio Edit] – 4:21
2. "Iz U" [Clean Album Version] – 5:39
3. "Iz U" [Album Version] – 5:39
4. "Iz U" [Instrumental] – 5:27

Europe promo

1. "Iz U" [Radio Edit] – 4:21
2. "Iz U" [Clean Album Version] – 5:39
3. "Iz U" [Album Version] – 5:39
4. "Iz U" [Instrumental] – 5:27

== Charts ==
=== Weekly charts ===
Chart (2003)	Peak position
Australia (ARIA)	34
Belgium (Ultratip Bubbling Under Flanders)	4
Germany (GfK)	47
Ireland (IRMA)	35
Netherlands (Dutch Top 40 Tipparade)	11
Netherlands (Single Top 100)	97
Scotland Singles (OCC)	45
Switzerland (Schweizer Hitparade)	43
UK Singles (OCC)	36
UK Hip Hop/R&B (OCC)	9
US Bubbling Under Hot 100 (Billboard)	3
US Hot R&B/Hip-Hop Songs (Billboard)	51
US Hot Rap Songs (Billboard)	23
US Rhythmic Airplay (Billboard)	21
