= My Place (song) =

2004 single by Nelly

Single by Nelly featuring Jaheim

from the album Suit
- A-side: "Flap Your Wings"
- B-side: "Hot in Herre" (remix); Don't Stop
- Released: July 19, 2004
- Studio: Derrty (Los Angeles); Platinum Sound Recording (New York City)
- Genre: Hip hop; R&B
- Length: 5:36 (album version); 4:33 (radio edit)
- Label: Universal; Derrty; Fo' Reel
- Songwriters: Nelly; Dorian Moore; Randy Edelman; El DeBarge; William DeBarge; Etterlene Jordan; Kenneth Gamble; Leon Huff
- Producer: Doe Mo' Beats

Nelly singles chronology
"Flap Your Wings" (2004)	"My Place" (2004)	"Tilt Ya Head Back" (2004)

Jaheim singles chronology
"Diamond in da Ruff" (2003)	"My Place" (2004)	"Everytime I Think About Her" (2005)

"My Place" is a song by American rapper Nelly featuring R&B singer Jaheim. It is the lead single from Nelly's fourth studio album, Suit (2004). The song is about Nelly inviting a girl over to his house, and the female backing vocals are provided by Kim Johnson. The track samples three songs: Labelle's "Isn't It a Shame", DeBarge's "I Like It", and Teddy Pendergrass's "Come Go with Me", so the respective songwriters are given credits.

"My Place" was released on July 19, 2004, to American radio. In the United Kingdom, Ireland, Australia, and New Zealand, the song was issued as a double A-side with "Flap Your Wings". Upon the single's release, it reached number four on the US Billboard Hot 100 and topped the charts of the United Kingdom, Australia, and New Zealand.

== Music video ==
The music video for "My Place" was directed by Benny Boom. Filmed in Los Angeles, California in the summer of 2004, the music video continues the last scene of the video "Flap Your Wings". Nelly's girlfriend (Tyeshia Robinson) and her friends catch Nelly up the hill with a girl and his girlfriend asks who she is. Nelly tries to explain but his girlfriend is too reluctant to listen and throws her chain at him. Nelly picks it up and takes it with him. Nelly tries to get in touch with his girlfriend by sending presents and texts but she declines his text and ignores his gift. Nelly tries to make things up with his girlfriend but she refuses and pushes him and goes back into her fashion boutique shop and throws his gift in the camera. Nelly continues rapping until the next scene when his ex-girlfriend is with her mates at a restaurant, imagining scenarios. She imagines her and her ex-boyfriend having sex. Nelly and his girlfriend are on a black screen thinking about each other and realizing how they have feelings for each other and how much they love each other. Nelly throws a photo frame containing a picture of him and his girlfriend inside it and his girlfriend appears to be crying. At a summer club, Nelly tracks down his girlfriend and they talk Nelly apologizes and puts the necklace she threw at him before back on her neck and they finally make up and embrace.

== Track listings ==
US 12-inch single

A1. "Flap Your Wings" (dirty album version) – 4:04
A2. "Flap Your Wings" (dirty with straight vox) – 4:04
A3. "Flap Your Wings" (instrumental) – 4:04
B1. "My Place" (dirty album version) – 4:32
B2. "My Place" (instrumental) – 5:40

UK CD single

1. "My Place" (radio edit) – 4:32
2. "Flap Your Wings" (radio edit) – 4:04
3. "Hot in Herre" (remix) – 3:45
4. "My Place" (video) – 4:28
5. "Flap Your Wings" (video) – 3:56

UK 12-inch single

A1. "My Place" (album version) – 5:40
A2. "My Place" (instrumental) – 5:40
B1. "Flap Your Wings" (album version) – 4:04
B2. "Flap Your Wings" – 4:04

European CD single

1. "My Place" (radio edit) – 4:32
2. "Flap Your Wings" – 4:04

European maxi-CD single

1. "My Place" (radio edit) – 4:33
2. "My Place" (album) – 5:38
3. "Flap Your Wings" – 4:05
4. "My Place" (video) – 4:54

Australian CD single

1. "My Place" (radio edit) – 4:32
2. "My Place" (album version) – 5:40
3. "Flap Your Wings" – 4:04
4. "Don't Stop" – 3:57

== Credits and personnel ==
Credits are lifted from the US promo CD liner notes.

Studios

- Recorded at Derrty Studio (Los Angeles) and Platinum Sound Recording (New York City)
- Mixed at Platinum Sound Recording (New York City)
- Mastered at The Hit Factory Mastering (New York City)

Personnel

- Nelly – writing, vocals
- Dorian Moore – writing
- Randy Edelman – writing ("Isn't It a Shame")
- El DeBarge – writing ("I Like It")
- William DeBarge – writing ("I Like It")
- Etterlene Jordan – writing ("I Like It")
- Kenneth Gamble – writing ("Come Go with Me")
- Leon Huff – writing ("Come Go with Me")
- Jaheim – vocals
- Kim Johnson – background vocals
- Doe Mo' Beats – production
- Carl Nappa – recording (Derrty)
- Serge Tsai – recording (Platinum Sound)
- Rich Travali – mixing
- Chip Karpells – mixing assistance
- Herb Powers Jr. – mastering

== Charts ==
=== Weekly charts ===
Chart (2004)	Peak position
Australia (ARIA)	1
Australian Urban (ARIA)	1
Austria (Ö3 Austria Top 40)	20
Belgium (Ultratop 50 Flanders)	17
Belgium (Ultratop 50 Wallonia)	27
Canada CHR/Pop Top 30 (Radio & Records)	4
Croatia (HRT)	2
Denmark (Tracklisten)	8
Europe (Eurochart Hot 100)	5
France (SNEP)	28
Germany (GfK)	8
Greece (IFPI)	26
Hungary (Editors' Choice Top 40)	21
Ireland (IRMA)	2
Italy (FIMI)	5
Netherlands (Dutch Top 40)	2
Netherlands (Single Top 100)	3
New Zealand (Recorded Music NZ)	1
Norway (VG-lista)	11
Romania (Romanian Top 100)	51
Russia Airplay (TopHit)	197
Scotland Singles (Official Charts)	4
Sweden (Sverigetopplistan)	18
Switzerland (Schweizer Hitparade)	5
UK Singles (Official Charts)	1
UK Hip Hop/R&B (Official Charts)	1
US Billboard Hot 100	4
US Hot R&B/Hip-Hop Songs (Billboard)	4
US Hot Rap Songs (Billboard)	2
US Pop Airplay (Billboard)	9
US Rhythmic Airplay (Billboard)	3

=== Year-end charts ===
Chart (2004)	Position
Australia (ARIA)	40
Australian Urban (ARIA)	17
Brazil (Crowley)	45
Germany (Media Control GfK)	71
Netherlands (Dutch Top 40)	52
Netherlands (Single Top 100)	82
New Zealand (RIANZ)	10
Switzerland (Schweizer Hitparade)	39
UK Singles (OCC)	26
UK Urban (Music Week)	15
US Billboard Hot 100	30
US Hot R&B/Hip-Hop Singles & Tracks (Billboard)	30
US Hot Rap Tracks (Billboard)	16
US Mainstream Top 40 (Billboard)	59
US Rhythmic Top 40 (Billboard)	21

== Certifications ==
Region	Certification	Certified units/sales
Australia (ARIA)	Platinum	70,000^{^}
New Zealand (RMNZ)	Platinum	30,000^{‡}
United Kingdom (BPI)	Silver	200,000^{^}
United States (RIAA)	Gold	500,000^{^}
^{^} Shipments figures based on certification alone.^{‡} Sales+streaming figures based on certification alone.

== Release history ==
Region	Date	Format(s)	Label(s)	Ref.
United States	July 19, 2004	Contemporary hit; rhythmic contemporary; urban radio	Universal; Derrty; Fo' Reel	
Europe	August 23, 2004	CD; maxi-CD	Universal; Derrty; Fo' Reel	
United Kingdom	August 30, 2004	CD	Universal; Derrty; Fo' Reel	
