= Number 1 (Nelly song) =

2001 single by Nelly

"#1"

Single by Nelly

from the album Training Day: The Soundtrack and Nellyville
- Released: August 21, 2001
- Length: 3:18
- Label: Priority
- Songwriters: Nelly; Waiel "Wally" Yaghnam
- Producer: Waiel "Wally" Yaghnam

Nelly singles chronology
"Batter Up" (2001)	"#1" (2001)	"Girlfriend" (remix) (2002)

Music video
- "#1" on YouTube

"#1" is a song by American rapper Nelly. It was released on August 21, 2001, as the lead single from the soundtrack to the 2001 film Training Day. It was also included on Nelly's second studio album Nellyville (2002). The song is most known for igniting the feud between Nelly and KRS-One, for which KRS-One perceived it as a diss track for being too similar to "I'm Still #1" by his group, Boogie Down Productions.

== Music video ==
The music video for the song features Joe Perry of Aerosmith on guitar. The plot of the video closely follows Training Day with Nelly playing a dual role as both Ethan Hawke and Denzel Washington's characters of a rookie cop and a corrupt veteran cop.

== Remix ==
The official remix features the group Clipse and Postaboy, and the song is on Nelly's remix album, Da Derrty Versions: The Reinvention.

== Charts ==
=== Weekly charts ===
Chart (2001–2002)	Peak position
Australia (ARIA)	20
Australian Urban (ARIA)	6
Austria (Ö3 Austria Top 40)	35
Europe (Eurochart Hot 100)	57
Germany (GfK)	16
Netherlands (Dutch Top 40 Tipparade)	6
Netherlands (Single Top 100)	52
Switzerland (Schweizer Hitparade)	22
US Billboard Hot 100	22
US Hot R&B/Hip-Hop Songs (Billboard)	20
US Pop Airplay (Billboard)	13
US Rhythmic Airplay (Billboard)	4

=== Year-end charts ===
Chart (2001)	Position
US Rhythmic Top 40 (Billboard)	69

Chart (2002)	Position
US Mainstream Top 40 (Billboard)	54
US Rhythmic Top 40 (Billboard)	41

== Release history ==
Region	Date	Format(s)	Label(s)	Ref.
United States	August 21, 2001	Urban radio	Priority	
Australia	January 14, 2002	CD	Priority	
