= Free City (album) =

2001 studio album by St. Lunatics

Studio album by St. Lunatics
- Released: June 5, 2001
- Recorded: 2000–2001
- Studio: New York City, New York; Electric Lady Studios; Unique Studios; Sound On Sound Recordings
- Genre: Hip hop
- Length: 71:02/76:29 (with bonus)
- Label: Fo' Reel; Universal
- Producer: Jason Epperson, Waiel "Wally" Yaghnam, City Spud, Rich Travali

Free City is the only studio album by hip-hop group St. Lunatics. It was released on June 5, 2001, almost a full year after the release of group member Nelly's debut, Country Grammar. The album was a commercial success as it debuted at number 3 on the Billboard 200 with 196,000 copies sold in its first week. The album was certified platinum by the RIAA a month later.

Professional ratings
Review scores
Source	Rating
AllMusic	link
RapReviews	(7/10) link
Rolling Stone	link

The title Free City came from their fifth member City Spud who was incarcerated at the time of release.

== Track listing ==
1. "Just for You (The Introductory Poem)" (feat. Amber Tabares) (1:26)
2. "S.T.L." (5:21) (Kyjuan, Ali, Murphy Lee, Nelly)
3. "Okay" (3:50) (Ali, Murphy Lee, Kyjuan)
4. "Summer in the City" (4:37) (Nelly, Kyjuan, Murphy Lee, Ali)
5. "Mad Baby Daddy (Skit), Part 1" (1:40)
6. "Boom D Boom" (3:27) (Ali)
7. "Midwest Swing" (4:40) (Nelly, Murphy Lee, Kyjuan, Ali)
8. "Show 'Em What They Won" (4:31) (Ali, Nelly, Kyjuan, Murphy Lee)
9. "Let Me in Now" (4:42) (Nelly, Ali, Murphy Lee, Kyjuan)
10. "Diz Iz Da Life" (4:31) (Ali, Murphy Lee, Kyjuan, Nelly)
11. "Mad Baby Daddy (Skit), Part 2" (1:06)
12. "Scandalous" (3:29) (Murphy Lee)
13. "Groovin' Tonight" (feat. Brian McKnight) (5:21) (Ali, Nelly, City Spud)
14. "Jang a Lang" (feat. Penelope) (4:24) (Nelly, Murphy Lee, Kyjuan)
15. "Mad Baby Daddy (Skit), Part 3" (1:44)
16. "Real Niggaz" (4:26) (Nelly, Kyjuan, Ali, Murphy Lee)
17. "Here We Come" (4:12) (Nelly)
18. "Love You So" (feat. Cardan) (4:03) (Ali, Murphy Lee)
19. "Mad Baby Daddy (Skit), Part 4" (3:32)
20. "Batter Up" (Bonus track) (5:27) (Nelly, Ali, Murphy Lee)

== Personnel ==
Credits for Free City adapted from CD Universe.

- St. Lunatics - lead vocals
- Jason "Jay E" Epperson - producer
- Waiel "Wally" Yaghnam - producer
- Steve Eigner - engineer
- Lavell "City Spud" Webb - producer
- Penelope - backing vocals
- Amber Tabares - backing vocals
- Little Rock - backing vocals
- Donneash Ferguson - backing vocals
- Duro Gimel "Young Guru" Keaton - engineer
- Cardan - additional vocals
- Brian McKnight - additional vocals
- John Adler - mixing
- Steve Eigner - guitar
- Bashiri Johnson - percussion
- Richard Travali- mixing
- Jonathan Mannion - photographer

== Charts ==
=== Weekly charts ===
Chart (2001)	Peak position
Canadian Albums (Billboard)	18
Canadian R&B Albums (Nielsen SoundScan)	11
New Zealand Albums (RMNZ)	24
US Billboard 200	3
US Top R&B/Hip-Hop Albums (Billboard)	1

=== Year-end charts ===
Year-end chart performance for Free City
Chart (2001)	Position
Canadian Albums (Nielsen SoundScan)	178
Canadian R&B Albums (Nielsen SoundScan)	38
Canadian Rap Albums (Nielsen SoundScan)	18
US Billboard 200	78
US Top R&B/Hip-Hop Albums (Billboard)	40

== Certifications ==
Region	Certification	Certified units/sales
Canada (Music Canada)	Gold	50,000^{^}
United States (RIAA)	Platinum	1,000,000^{^}
^{^} Shipments figures based on certification alone.
