= Country Grammar (Hot Shit) =

2000 single by Nelly

- US artwork

Single by Nelly

from the album Country Grammar
- B-side: "Greed Hate Envy"
- Released: February 29, 2000
- Recorded: 1999
- Studio: Unique (New York City)
- Length: 4:48 (album version); 4:19 (radio edit)
- Label: Fo' Reel; Universal
- Composer: Jason "Jay E" Epperson
- Lyricist: Nelly
- Producer: Jason "Jay E" Epperson

Nelly singles chronology
| "Country Grammar (Hot Shit)" (2000) | "E.I." (2000) |

Alternative cover
- European and Australian artwork

Music video
- "Country Grammar (Hot Shit)" on YouTube

"Country Grammar (Hot Shit)" (also known as "Country Grammar (Hot...) "in the clean version, and released as a single under the title (Hot S**t) Country Grammar) is a song by American rapper Nelly. The song was written by Nelly and Jason "Jay E" Epperson, who also produced the track. Released on February 29, 2000, as the lead single from Nelly's 2000 debut album, Country Grammar, the single peaked at number seven in both the United States and the United Kingdom and reached the top 20 in Australia, Canada, Germany, and the Netherlands.

== Composition ==
The song's melody and chorus were taken from a song popularly sung by children with clapping games called "Down Down Baby". On the clean version, the word "shit" is backmasked, and most of the explicit words are replaced by radio-friendly words and bleep-related sound effects. For instance, the lyrics "street sweeper baby cocked" in the chorus are replaced with "boom boom baby" because the slang term "Street Sweeper" refers to an automatic shotgun.

"Country Grammar" references Beenie Man's 1998 dancehall single "Who Am I (Sim Simma)" with the line, "Keys to my beemer, man, holla at Beenie Man".

== Music video ==
The video features Nelly rapping in front of several key landmarks across St. Louis such as the Gateway Arch and Lafayette Square. St. Lunatics and Murphy Lee make cameo appearances.

== Track listings ==
US CD single
| No. | Title | Length |
|---|---|---|
| 1. | "(Hot S**t) Country Grammar" (clean edit) | 4:15 |
| 2. | "(Hot S**t) Country Grammar" (dirty edit) | 4:15 |
| 3. | "Greed Hate Envy" | 0:30 |
| 4. | "E.I." | 0:30 |
| 5. | "Ride wit Me" | 0:30 |

US 12-inch single
| No. | Title | Length |
|---|---|---|
| 1. | "(Hot S**t) Country Grammar" (clean edit) | 4:49 |
| 2. | "(Hot S**t) Country Grammar" (dirty edit) | 4:49 |
| 3. | "(Hot S**t) Country Grammar" (instrumental) | 4:49 |

UK CD single
| No. | Title | Length |
|---|---|---|
| 1. | "Country Grammar" (superclean radio edit) | 3:52 |
| 2. | "Luven Me" | 4:07 |
| 3. | "Country Grammar" (instrumental) | 4:48 |
| 4. | "Country Grammar" (video) |

UK 12-inch single
| No. | Title | Length |
|---|---|---|
| 1. | "Country Grammar" (album version) | 4:47 |
| 2. | "Country Grammar" (acapella) | 3:58 |
| 3. | "Country Grammar" (instrumental) | 4:48 |

UK cassette single
| No. | Title | Length |
|---|---|---|
| 1. | "Country Grammar" (superclean radio edit) | 3:52 |
| 2. | "Luven Me" | 4:07 |
| 3. | "Country Grammar" (instrumental) | 4:48 |

European CD single
| No. | Title | Length |
|---|---|---|
| 1. | "Country Grammar" (new radio edit) | 3:04 |
| 2. | "Country Grammar" (superclean radio edit with FX) | 3:50 |

Australian CD single
| No. | Title | Length |
|---|---|---|
| 1. | "Country Grammar" (new radio edit) | 3:04 |
| 2. | "Country Grammar" (superclean radio edit with FX) | 3:50 |
| 3. | "Country Grammar" (2 step mix) | 5:56 |
| 4. | "Country Grammar" (album version) | 4:47 |

== Credits and personnel ==
Credits are taken from the Country Grammar liner notes.

Studios

- Recorded at Unique Studios (New York City)
- Mixed at Sound on Sound Studios (New York City)
- Mastered at Powers House of Sound (New York City)

Personnel

- Nelly – lyrics
- Jason "Jay E" Epperson – music, production
- Steve Eigner – recording, engineering
- Kenny Dykstra – recording and engineering assistance
- Rich Travali – mixing
- Jason Standard – mixing assistance
- Herb Powers – mastering

== Charts ==
=== Weekly charts ===
| Chart (2000–2001) | Peak position |
|---|---|
| Australia (ARIA) | 20 |
| Australian Urban (ARIA) | 8 |
| Austria (Ö3 Austria Top 40) | 61 |
| Canada Top Singles (RPM) | 10 |
| Europe (Eurochart Hot 100) | 34 |
| Germany (GfK) | 20 |
| Ireland (IRMA) | 22 |
| Netherlands (Dutch Top 40) | 31 |
| Netherlands (Single Top 100) | 20 |
| New Zealand (Recorded Music NZ) | 43 |
| Scottish Singles Sales (Official Charts) | 20 |
| Sweden (Sverigetopplistan) | 56 |
| Switzerland (Schweizer Hitparade) | 58 |
| UK Singles (Official Charts) | 7 |
| UK Dance (Official Charts) | 8 |
| UK Hip Hop/R&B (Official Charts) | 1 |
| US Billboard Hot 100 | 7 |
| US Hot R&B/Hip-Hop Songs (Billboard) | 5 |
| US Hot Rap Songs (Billboard) | 1 |
| US Pop Airplay (Billboard) | 9 |
| US Rhythmic Airplay (Billboard) | 1 |

=== Year-end charts ===
| Chart (2000) | Position |
|---|---|
| UK Singles (OCC) | 175 |
| US Billboard Hot 100 | 29 |
| US Hot R&B/Hip-Hop Singles & Tracks (Billboard) | 19 |
| US Hot Rap Singles (Billboard) | 5 |
| US Mainstream Top 40 (Billboard) | 48 |
| US Rhythmic Top 40 (Billboard) | 4 |

| Chart (2001) | Position |
|---|---|
| Australia (ARIA) | 77 |
| US Mainstream Top 40 (Billboard) | 99 |

== Certifications ==
| Region | Certification | Certified units/sales |
|---|---|---|
| Australia (ARIA) | Gold | 35,000^{^} |
| New Zealand (RMNZ) | Platinum | 30,000^{‡} |
| United Kingdom (BPI) | Silver | 200,000^{‡} |
| United States (RIAA) | 4× Platinum | 4,000,000^{‡} |
^{^} Shipments figures based on certification alone.^{‡} Sales+streaming figures based on certification alone.

== Release history ==
| Region | Date | Format(s) | Label(s) | Ref(s). |
|---|---|---|---|---|
| United States | February 29, 2000 | 12-inch vinyl; CD | Universal | |
| United States | March 7, 2000 | Urban radio | Universal | |
| United States | March 21, 2000 | Rhythmic contemporary radio | Universal | |
| United States | June 13, 2000 | Contemporary hit radio | Universal | |
| United Kingdom | October 30, 2000 | 12-inch vinyl; CD; cassette | Universal | |
