= E.I. (song) =

2000 single by Nelly

Single by Nelly

from the album Country Grammar
- B-side: "Greed, Hate, Envy"; "Come Over"
- Released: October 17, 2000
- Studio: Unique (New York City)
- Length: 4:45 (main version); 4:12 (radio version)
- Label: Fo'Reel Entertainment; Universal
- Composer: Jason "Jay E" Epperson
- Lyricist: Nelly
- Producer: Jason "Jay E" Epperson

Nelly singles chronology
"Country Grammar (Hot Shit)" (2000)	"E.I." (2000)	"Ride wit Me" (2001)

Music video
- "E.I." on YouTube

"E.I." is a song by American rapper Nelly. Released as the second single on October 17, 2000, from his debut album Country Grammar, it peaked at number 11 on the UK Singles Chart and 16 on the US Billboard Hot 100. A remix of the song, called "Tip Drill", was released in 2003 along with lyrics and a music video that drew controversy for its misogynistic themes.

== Remixes ==
"Tip Drill", or "E.I. (Remix)" is the name of a 2003 remix of the song. It appeared as the fourth track on his 2003 remix album Da Derrty Versions: The Reinvention. An alternate version featuring vocals from Nelly's group, the St. Lunatics, which is listed as the "Tip Drill Remix", appears as the final track on Da Derrty Versions: The Reinvention. Both versions were produced by David Banner. In one interpretation of the song's meaning by Mark Anthony Neal, the phrase tip drill is a "ghetto colloquialism for the proverbial ugly girl with a nice body."

The song's music video (directed by Solomite), made for the version featuring the St. Lunatics, became controversial for overtly depicting women as sexual objects, so it aired on BET: Uncut as opposed to 106 & Park. Because of how overtly sexual it was, it ended up being one of the many reasons BET: Uncut was cancelled in 2006. It was meant to be a single but was withdrawn due to its potentially offensive content. Despite this, Nelly's solo version of the song received moderate airplay on urban contemporary radio stations in the United States and peaked at number 65 on the US Hot R&B/Hip-Hop Singles & Tracks chart in early 2004.

=== Controversy ===
In 2004, women's studies students at Spelman College in Atlanta, Georgia protested against misogyny in rap music and "Tip Drill" specifically. The students criticized the negative portrayal and sexual objectification of black American women in the video, which showed women in bikinis dancing and simulating various sexual acts, men throwing money on women's breasts and buttocks, and Nelly swiping a credit card between a woman's buttocks after which it starts bouncing. Nelly's 4Sho4Kids Foundation was scheduled to hold a bone marrow drive on campus to help his sister who suffered from leukemia: Spelman Feminist Majority Leadership Alliance President Moya Bailey and Leana Cabral named Nelly the "Misogynist of the Month" and the flyers they and other members placed on campus prompted the foundation to cancel the drive. The president of the Student Government, Asha Jennings, said: "Nelly wants us to help his sister, but he's degrading hundreds of us." According to Spelman students, Nelly's Foundation refused to hold the drive unless the university promised that students would not confront him about his song and the video. The Foundation canceled the drive.

In 2008, Nelly stated that his daughter, Chanelle, had never seen the video.

== Track listings ==
UK CD single

1. "E.I." (clean edit with FX)
2. "Greed, Hate, Envy"
3. "E.I." (instrumental)
4. "E.I." (video)

UK 12-inch single

A1. "E.I." (album version)
B1. "E.I." (instrumental)
B2. "E.I." (clean edit with FX)

UK cassette single

1. "E.I." (clean edit with FX)
2. "Greed, Hate, Envy"
3. "E.I." (instrumental)

European CD single

1. "E.I." (clean radio edit with FX)
2. "Come Over"

Australian CD single

1. "E.I." (clean radio edit with FX) – 4:12
2. "Greed, Hate, Envy" – 4:15
3. "E.I." (instrumental) – 4:45
4. "Come Over" – 4:13

== Credits and personnel ==
Credits are taken from the Country Grammar liner notes.

Studios

- Recorded at Unique Studios (New York City)
- Mixed at Sound on Sound Studios (New York City)
- Mastered at Powers House of Sound (New York City)

Personnel

- Nelly – lyrics
- Jason "Jay E" Epperson – music, production
- Steve Eigner – recording, engineering
- Kenny Dykstra – recording and engineering assistance
- Rich Travali – mixing
- Jason Standard – mixing assistance
- Herb Powers – mastering

== Charts ==
=== Weekly charts ===
Chart (2000–2001)	Peak position
Australia (ARIA)	12
Australian Urban (ARIA)	5
Austria (Ö3 Austria Top 40)	65
Europe (Eurochart Hot 100)	50
Germany (GfK)	22
Ireland (IRMA)	15
Netherlands (Dutch Top 40)	36
Netherlands (Single Top 100)	30
Scotland Singles (OCC)	28
Switzerland (Schweizer Hitparade)	89
UK Singles (OCC)	11
UK Dance (OCC)	7
UK Hip Hop/R&B (OCC)	2
US Billboard Hot 100	15
US Hot R&B/Hip-Hop Songs (Billboard)	10
US Pop Airplay (Billboard)	19
US Rhythmic Airplay (Billboard)	2

=== Year-end charts ===
Chart (2000)	Position
US Rhythmic Top 40 (Billboard)	42

Chart (2001)	Position
Australia (ARIA)	62
UK Urban (Music Week)	26
US Billboard Hot 100	95
US Hot R&B/Hip-Hop Singles & Tracks (Billboard)	92
US Mainstream Top 40 (Billboard)	81
US Rhythmic Top 40 (Billboard)	33

== Certifications ==
Region	Certification	Certified units/sales
Australia (ARIA)	Gold	35,000^{^}
New Zealand (RMNZ)	Gold	15,000^{‡}
United States (RIAA)	Platinum	1,000,000^{‡}
^{^} Shipments figures based on certification alone.^{‡} Sales+streaming figures based on certification alone.

== Release history ==
Region	Date	Format(s)	Label(s)	Ref.
United States	October 17, 2000	Urban radio	Fo'Reel; Universal	
United States	November 28, 2000	Contemporary hit radio	Fo'Reel; Universal	
United Kingdom	February 12, 2001	12-inch vinyl; CD; cassette	Fo'Reel; Universal	
Australia	April 30, 2001	CD	Fo'Reel; Universal	
