= Work It (Nelly song) =

2003 song by Nelly

Single by Nelly featuring Justin Timberlake

from the album Nellyville
- B-side: "Put Your Hands Up"
- Released: February 24, 2003
- Length: 4:01
- Label: Universal
- Songwriters: Nelly; Justin Timberlake; Jason "Jay E" Epperson
- Producer: Epperson

Nelly singles chronology
"Air Force Ones" (2002)	"Work It" (2003)	"Pimp Juice" (2003)

Justin Timberlake singles chronology
"Cry Me a River" (2002)	"Work It" (2003)	"Rock Your Body" (2003)

"Work It" is a single by American rapper Nelly featuring American singer-songwriter Justin Timberlake. It was released on February 24, 2003, as the fourth single from Nelly's 2002 album, Nellyville. It peaked at number 68 on the Billboard Hot 100 and number seven on the UK Singles Chart.

== Critical reception ==
Tom Sinclair of Entertainment Weekly panned the collaboration, stating that the song was one of the weaker tracks in Nellyville despite the inclusion of Justin Timberlake. Dele Fadele of NME described it as a "silly pop-directed collaboration with Justin Timberlake of *N Sync." Writing for PopMatters, Wayne Franklin noted that Timberlake croons on the song.

== Commercial performance ==
"Work It" peaked at number 68 on the Billboard Hot 100 on the March 13, 2004, issue of Billboard, charting for five weeks. It also peaked at number seven on the UK Singles Chart on March 15, 2003, spending 11 weeks on the chart.

== Music video ==
The music video for “Work It” by Nelly featuring Justin Timberlake, released in early 2003, was directed by Joseph Kahn and filmed at the Playboy Mansion, where the artists are seen playing tennis and socializing with several Playboy Playmates in a stylized, lighthearted setting. The video includes a cameo by Playboy founder Hugh Hefner, reinforcing the mansion’s iconic status in pop culture. Kahn crafted the visuals to match the song’s playful tone and celebrity-lifestyle themes.

== Track listings ==
UK CD single

No.	Title	Length
1.	"Work It (Radio Edit)"	4:00
2.	"Put Your Hands Up"	5:17
3.	"Air Force Ones"	5:04
4.	"Air Force Ones (Video)"	5:04

UK 12-inch single

No.	Title	Length
1.	"Work It (Album Version)"	4:22
2.	"Work It (Nevins Universal Dub)"	6:33
3.	"Air Force Ones"	5:04

UK remix CD single

No.	Title	Length
1.	"Work It (DJ Swamp)"	4:22
2.	"Work It (Nevins Universal Dub)"	6:33
3.	"Dilemma (G4orce Full Vocal Mix)"
4.	Untitled	5:57

European CD single

No.	Title	Length
1.	"Work It (Radio Edit)"	4:00
2.	"Work It (Copenhaniacs Remix)"	3:45
3.	"Work It (Nevins Universal Dub)"	6:33
4.	"Put Your Hands Up"	5:17

Canadian CD single

No.	Title	Length
1.	"Work It (Radio Edit)"	4:01
2.	"Put Your Hands Up"	5:17

== Charts ==
Chart (2003–2004)	Peak position
Australia (ARIA)	14
Australian Urban (ARIA)	6
Austria (Ö3 Austria Top 40)	53
Belgium (Ultratop 50 Flanders)	26
Belgium (Ultratop 50 Wallonia)	37
Canada (Nielsen SoundScan)	13
Denmark (Tracklisten)	16
Europe (Eurochart Hot 100)	25
Germany (GfK)	31
Greece (IFPI)	14
Ireland (IRMA)	11
Netherlands (Dutch Top 40)	17
Netherlands (Single Top 100)	16
New Zealand (Recorded Music NZ)	17
Norway (VG-lista)	15
Scotland Singles (OCC)	9
Sweden (Sverigetopplistan)	41
Switzerland (Schweizer Hitparade)	59
UK Singles (OCC)	7
UK Airplay (Music Week)	41
UK Hip Hop/R&B (OCC)	1
US Billboard Hot 100	68
US Pop Airplay (Billboard)	24

== Certifications ==
Region	Certification	Certified units/sales
Australia (ARIA)	Gold	35,000^{^}
^{^} Shipments figures based on certification alone.

== Release history ==
Region	Date	Format(s)	Label(s)	Ref(s).
Australia	February 24, 2003	CD single	Universal	
United Kingdom	March 3, 2003	12-inch single; CD single	Universal	

== Other versions and in popular culture ==
The song was remixed by Scott Storch and was included on Nelly's 2003 remix album Da Derrty Versions: The Reinvention. Another remix by Jason Nevins sampled AC/DC's 1980 single "Back in Black", which received considerable airplay, but was not officially released. The "Nevins Universal Dub" remix was played in the viral internet sensation clip of Robin Schreiber dancing at the Golden State Warriors basketball game on November 9, 2016
