= Heavy Starch =

Studio album by Ali
- Released: April 30, 2002
- Recorded: 2001–2002
- Genre: Hip-hop
- Length: 74:56
- Label: Universal
- Producers: Jason "Jay E" Epperson; Waiel "Wally" Yaghnam; Trife; Tarboy

Ali chronology
Heavy Starch (2002)	Kinfolk (2007)

Heavy Starch is the debut studio album by American rapper Ali. It was released on April 30, 2002, via Universal Records. The album features guest appearances from fellow St. Lunatics members Kyjuan, Murphy Lee, & Nelly, St. Louis Alumni, Ms. Toi, Kandi Burruss, Toya, and Waiel "Wally" Yaghnam. Its first single was "Boughetto".

In the United States, Heavy Starch debuted at number 24 on the Billboard 200 and peaked at number seven on Billboard's Top R&B/Hip-Hop Albums.

== Critical reception ==
Professional ratings
Review scores
Source	Rating
AllMusic	3/5 stars
HipHopDX	3/5 stars
RapReviews	7/10 stars
USA Today	2.5/5 stars
Vibe	1/5 stars

USA Today wrote: "Ali's debut album has plenty of the expected party anthems and booty shakers, but he also draws on his former hustling days for thematically tougher material. Still, the songs that shine showcase his generous sense of humor."

== Track listing ==
No.	Title	Producer(s)	Length
1.	"Intro"	Jason "Jay E" Epperson	1:52
2.	"I Got This" (featuring Waiel "Wally" Yaghnam)	Waiel "Wally" Yaghnam	4:51
3.	"Crucial" (featuring Murphy Lee)	Jason "Jay E" Epperson	4:12
4.	"Ore-Ore-O"	Jason "Jay E" Epperson	4:09
5.	"No" (featuring Kyjuan, Murphy Lee & Nelly)	Jason "Jay E" Epperson	4:48
6.	"Boughetto" (featuring Murphy Lee)	Waiel "Wally" Yaghnam	4:35
7.	"360"	Jason "Jay E" Epperson	3:50
8.	"Wiggle, Wiggle" (featuring Kyjuan, Murphy Lee & Nelly)	Jason "Jay E" Epperson	4:59
9.	"Drop Top" (featuring Kandi)	Jason "Jay E" Epperson	3:38
10.	"Collection Plate" (featuring Kyjuan, Murphy Lee & Nelly)	Jason "Jay E" Epperson	5:11
11.	"Passin' Me By" (featuring Toya)	Jason "Jay E" Epperson	2:22
12.	"Bitch"	Tarboy	3:31
13.	"Beast"	Trife	3:39
14.	"Cool as Hell" (featuring Kyjuan, Murphy Lee & Nelly)	Jason "Jay E" Epperson	5:19
15.	"St. Louis Alumni" (featuring St. Louis Alumni)	Jason "Jay E" Epperson	9:45
16.	"Serious"	Trife	4:04
17.	"Walk Away" (featuring Ms. Toi & Nelly)	Jason "Jay E" Epperson	4:11
Total length:			74:56

== Charts ==
Chart (2002)	Peak position
US Billboard 200	24
US Top R&B/Hip-Hop Albums (Billboard)	7
