= Pimp Juice =

Single by Nelly

from the album Nellyville
- B-side: "Ride wit Me"
- Released: March 10, 2003
- Length: 4:52
- Label: Universal
- Songwriter: Nelly
- Producer: Epperson

Nelly singles chronology
"Work It" (2003)	"Pimp Juice" (2003)	"Shake Ya Tailfeather" (2003)

"Pimp Juice" is the fourth US and Canadian single by American rapper Nelly, released on March 10, 2003, from his 2002 album, Nellyville. The song peaked at number 58 on the Billboard Hot 100.

In the song, Nelly states that women only want him for his "pimp juice", which he needs to let loose. He later explains that "pimp juice" is anything used to "attract the opposite sex/It could be money, fame, or straight intellect" and that "Pimp juice is color blind/You find it work on all color creeds and kinds". The song was featured in VH1's "50 Most Awesomely Bad Songs...Ever" at number 30.

== Controversy ==
The song received backlash for its apparent glorification of prostitution. In 2004, students at Spelman College, the historically black women's college in Atlanta, protested Nelly's bone-marrow drive—which he had started after discovering his sister had been diagnosed with leukemia.

== Remix ==
The official remix features Ronald Isley of The Isley Brothers and The Feed's David Grelle on keyboard, and the song is on Nelly's remix album, Da Derrty Versions: The Reinvention. It contains a sample of "Curtains" by The Jeff Lorber Fusion.

== Track listing ==
US 12-inch vinyl

A1. "Pimp Juice" (clean album version) – 4:52
A2. "Pimp Juice" (dirty album version) – 4:52
A3. "Pimp Juice" (instrumental) – 4:52
B1. "Pimp Juice" (clean album version) – 4:52
B2. "Pimp Juice" (dirty album version) – 4:52
B3. "Pimp Juice" (instrumental) – 4:52

== Charts ==
Chart (2003)	Peak Position
US Billboard Hot 100	58
US Hot R&B/Hip-Hop Songs (Billboard)	27
US Hot Rap Songs (Billboard)	11
US Rhythmic Airplay (Billboard)	20

== See also ==
- Pimp Juice (drink)
