= Murphy's Law (Murphy Lee album) =

Studio album by Murphy Lee
- Released: September 23, 2003
- Studios: Basement Beats Studios (St. Louis, MO); Stankonia Recording (Atlanta, GA); The Hit Factory (New York, NY); SouthSide Studios (Atlanta, GA); Daddy's House Recording Studio (New York, NY)
- Genre: Hip-hop
- Length: 69:15
- Label: Universal
- Producers: City Spud; Jason "Koko" Bridges; Jason "Jay E" Epperson; Jazze Pha; Jermaine Dupri; Mannie Fresh; Murphy Lee; Waiel "Wally" Yaghnam

Murphy Lee chronology
Murphy's Law (2003)	You See Me (2009)

Singles from Murphy's Law
- 1. "Shake Ya Tailfeather" Released: June 29, 2003; 2. "Wat Da Hook Gon Be" Released: September 30, 2003; 3. "Luv Me Baby" Released: 2003

Professional ratings
Review scores
Source	Rating
AllMusic	2.5/5 stars
RapReviews	8.5/10
Vibe	3.5/5 stars

Da Skool Boy Presents Murphy's Law is the debut solo studio album by American rapper Murphy Lee. It was released on September 23, 2003 via Universal Records. The recording sessions took place at Basement Beats Studios in St. Louis, Stankonia Recording and SouthSide Studios in Atlanta, The Hit Factory and Daddy's House Recording Studio in New York City. Production was handled by Jay E, Waiel "Wally" Yaghnam, Jermaine Dupri, City Spud, Jayson "Koko" Bridges, Jazze Pha, Mannie Fresh, and Murphy Lee himself, with LRoc serving as co-producer.

It features guest appearances from fellow St. Lunatics members Nelly, Ali, Kyjuan and City Spud, as well as Darius Bradford, St. Louis Slim, King Jacob, Prentice Church, Avery Storm, Cardan, Jazze Pha, Jermaine Dupri, Lil Jon, Lil Wayne, Moshay, P. Diddy, Roscoe, Seven, Sleepy Brown, Toya and Zee.

In the United States, the album debuted at number 8 on the Billboard 200 and number 5 on the Top R&B/Hip-Hop Albums charts, selling around 135,000 copies in its first week. It was certified gold by the Recording Industry Association of America on November 17, 2003 for the sales of 500,000 units.

The album was supported by the single "Shake Ya Tailfeather", which originally appeared on Bad Boys II Soundtrack. The official lead single off of the album, "Wat Da Hook Gon Be", peaked at number 17 on the Billboard Hot 100 and number 11 on the Hot R&B/Hip-Hop Songs charts. The follow-up single "Luv Me Baby" made it to number 54 on the Hot R&B/Hip-Hop Songs chart. The song "Hold Up" was released as a promotional single.

== Track listing ==
No.	Title	Writer(s)	Producer(s)	Length
1.	"Be Myself"	Jason Epperson; Tommy Keith; Bernadette Randle	Jay E	0:36
2.	"Don't Blow It" (featuring City Spud)	Torhi Harper; Lavell Webb; Waiel Yaghnam	City Spud	4:18
3.	"Hold Up" (featuring Nelly)	Harper; Byron Thomas	Mannie Fresh	4:21
4.	"Grandpa Gametight"	Harper; Epperson	Jay E	3:58
5.	"Luv Me Baby" (featuring Jazze Pha and Sleepy Brown)	Harper; Phalon Alexander	Jazze Pha	4:27
6.	"Murphy's Law (Skit)" (featuring Darius Bradford and St. Louis Slim)	Darius Bradford; St. Louis Slim	Murphy Lee	2:20
7.	"Cool wit It" (featuring St. Lunatics and Moshay)	Harper; Cornell Haynes; Ali Jones; Robert Cleveland; Epperson; Steve Eigner	Jay E	5:05
8.	"This Goes Out" (featuring Nelly, Roscoe, Cardan, Lil' Jon and Lil' Wayne)	Harper; Haynes; Pierre Devon Jones; Jonathan Smith; Dwayne Carter; Epperson	Jay E	4:54
9.	"What da Hook Gon Be" (featuring Jermaine Dupri)	Harper; Jermaine Dupri; James Phillips	Jermaine Dupri; LRoc (co.)	3:44
10.	"So X-Treme" (featuring King Jacob and Prentice Church)	Harper; Jacob Earl Thomas; Prentiss Church; Yaghnam	Waiel "Wally" Yaghnam	4:52
11.	"How Many Kids You Got (Skit)" (featuring Darius Bradford and St. Louis Slim)	Bradford; St. Louis Slim	Murphy Lee	0:32
12.	"I Better Go" (featuring Avery Storm)	Harper; Yaghnam	Waiel "Wally" Yaghnam	4:14
13.	"Red Hot Riplets" (featuring St. Lunatics)	Harper; Haynes; A. Jones; Cleveland; Epperson	Jay E	4:46
14.	"Regular Guy" (featuring Seven)	Harper; Epperson	Jay E	3:41
15.	"Gods Don't Chill" (featuring King Jacob and Prentice Church)	Harper; J. Thomas; Church; Yaghnam	Waiel "Wally" Yaghnam	3:44
16.	"Murphy Lee" (featuring Zee)	Harper; Dupri; Phillips; Marvin Gaye	Jermaine Dupri; LRoc (co.)	4:29
17.	"Head from a Midget (Skit)" (featuring Darius Bradford and St. Louis Slim)	Bradford; St. Louis Slim	Murphy Lee	0:17
18.	"Shake Ya Tailfeather" (featuring Nelly and P. Diddy)	Harper; Haynes; Varick Smith; Jason Bridges	Jayson "Koko" Bridges	4:55
19.	"Same Ol' Dirty" (featuring Toya)	Harper; Yaghnam	Waiel "Wally" Yaghnam	4:02
Total length:				69:15

Japan & Europe release bonus tracks
No.	Title	Length
20.	"Grown Ass Man"	3:59
21.	"Jungle Gym"	3:30
Total length:		76:59

Sample credits

- Track 1 contains samples from "I Wanna Be Myself" written by Tommy Keith and Bernadette Randle and performed by the Rimshots.
- Track 16 embodies portions of "Mercy Mercy Me (The Ecology)" written and performed by Marvin Gaye.

== Charts ==
=== Weekly charts ===
Chart (2003)	Peak position
US Billboard 200	8
US Top R&B/Hip-Hop Albums (Billboard)	5

=== Year-end charts ===
Chart (2003)	Position
US Top R&B/Hip-Hop Albums (Billboard)	92

== Certifications ==
Region	Certification	Certified units/sales
United States (RIAA)	Gold	500,000^{^}
^{^} Shipments figures based on certification alone.
