= Murphy Lee =

American rapper (born 1978)

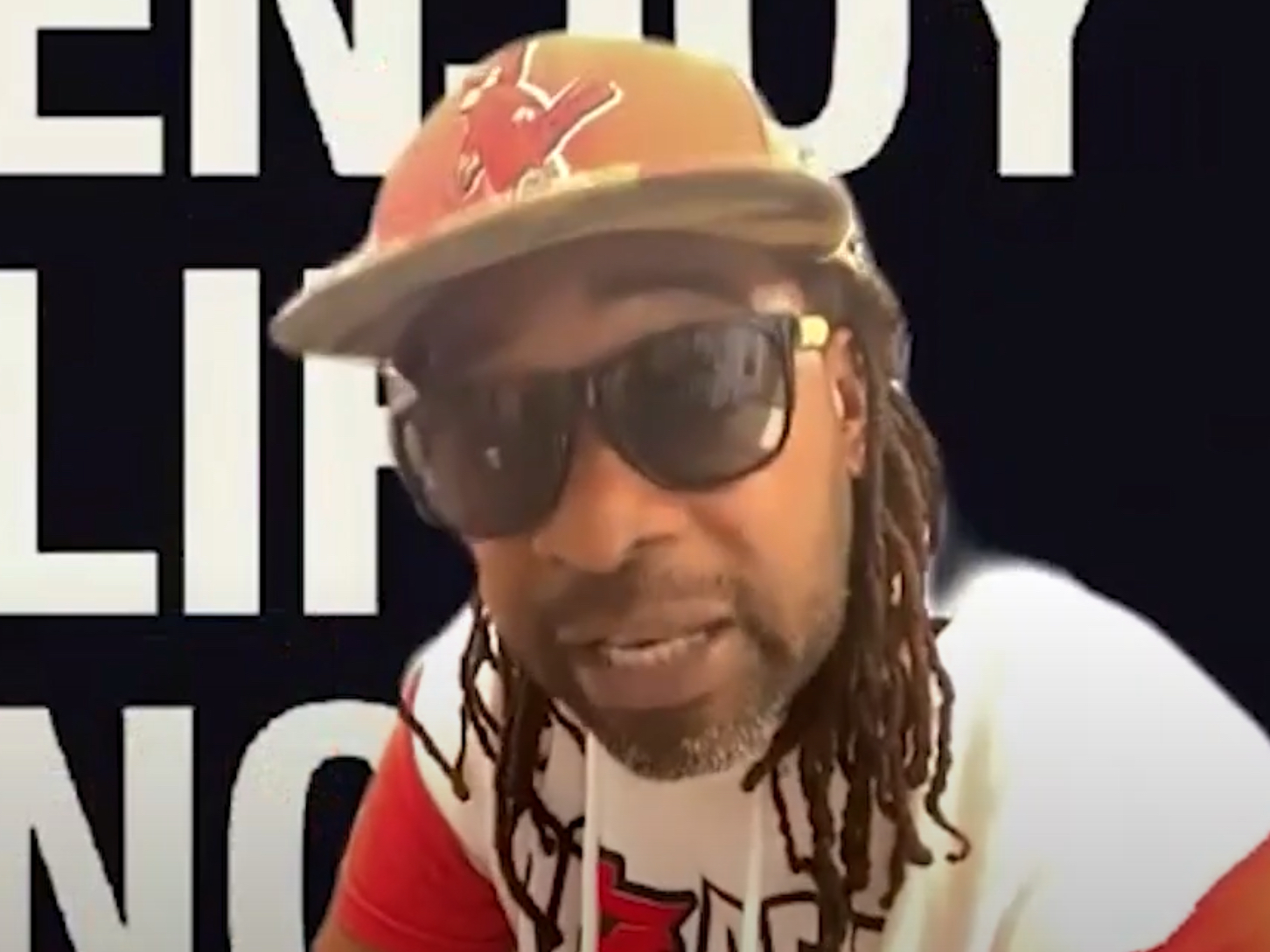
- Lee in 2023

Background information
- Born: Torhi Murphy Lee Harper; December 18, 1982 (age 43); St. Louis, Missouri, U.S.
- Origin: University City, Missouri, U.S.
- Genres: Hip hop; pop rap
- Occupation: Rapper
- Years active: 1997–present
- Labels: Derrty; U C Me; Universal
- Formerly of: St. Lunatics
- Website: newmurph.com

Torhi Murphy Lee Harper (born December 18, 1982), better known by his stage name Murphy Lee, is an American rapper who is best known as a member of the St. Louis, Missouri-based hip hop group, St. Lunatics. Following the commercial success of its lead member Nelly in the early 2000s, Lee signed with his label Derrty Entertainment, an imprint of Universal Records to release his debut studio album, Murphy's Law (2003). It peaked at number eight on the Billboard 200 and was supported by the Billboard Hot 100-number one single "Shake Your Tailfeather" (with Nelly and P. Diddy), which was also included on the accompanying soundtrack to the 2003 film Bad Boys II.

== Discography ==
=== Studio albums ===
Year	Title	Peak chart positions		RIAA certifications
Year	Title	US	US R&B	RIAA certifications
2003	Murphy's Law: Released: September 23, 2003; Label: Derrty Entertainment/Universal; Format: CD, digital download	8	5	RIAA: Gold
2009	You See Me: Released: December 16, 2009; Label: UCME Entertainment; Format: digital download	-	-	-

=== Singles ===
Year	Song	U.S. Hot 100	U.S. R&B	U.S. Rap	Album
2003	"Wat Da Hook Gon Be" (featuring Jermaine Dupri)	17	11	6	Murphy's Law
2004	"Luv Me Baby" (featuring Sleepy Brown & Jazze Pha)	119	54	25	Murphy's Law
2004	"Hold Up" (featuring Nelly)	—	—	—	Murphy's Law
2006	"Dat Bullshit"	—	—	—	New P.O.L.O
2007	"Hatin'" (featuring Young Dro)	—	—	—	New P.O.L.O
2008	"Murph Derrty"	—	—	—	New P.O.L.O
2008	"My Shoes" (featuring Kanja)	—	—	—	You See Me

=== Featured singles ===
Year	Song	U.S. Hot 100	U.S. R&B	U.S. Rap	Album
2001	"Batter Up" (Nelly featuring Murphy Lee & Ali)	—	76	—	Country Grammar
2002	"Air Force Ones" (Nelly featuring Ali, Murphy Lee, & Kyjuan)	3	4	1	Nellyville
2003	"Shake Ya Tailfeather" (Nelly featuring P. Diddy & Murphy Lee)	1	3	1	Bad Boys II soundtrack

=== Guest appearances ===
- 2001: "Batter Up" (Nelly featuring Murphy Lee & Ali)
- 2001: "Thicky Thick Girl" (Nelly featuring Murphy Lee & Ali)
- 2001: "Steal the Show" (Nelly featuring Ali, Murphy Lee, & Kyjuan)
- 2001: "Wrap Sumden" (Nelly featuring Ali, Murphy Lee, & Kyjuan)
- 2002: "Dem Boyz" (Nelly featuring Kyjuan & Murphy Lee)
- 2002: "Oh Nelly" (Nelly featuring Murphy Lee)
- 2002: "Air Force Ones" (Nelly featuring Ali, Murphy Lee, & Kyjuan)
- 2002: "Roc the Mic (Remix)" (Nelly featuring Freeway, Murphy Lee, & Beanie Sigel)
- 2002: "Thinkin' About You" (Solange ft. Murphy Lee)
- 2002: "CG 2" (Nelly featuring Kyjuan & Murphy Lee)
- 2002: "Boughetto" (Ali featuring Murphy Lee)
- 2003: "Welcome to Atlanta (Remix)" (Ludacris featuring P. Diddy, Murphy Lee, & Snoop Dogg)
- 2003: "Gigolo (Remix)" (Nick Cannon ft. R. Kelly, E-40 & Murphy Lee)
- 2003: "Sample Dat Ass" (Chingy ft. Murphy Lee)
- 2003: "Drop Dead Gorgeous" (Kanye West ft. Murphy Lee)
- 2004: "Tipsy" (Remix) (J-Kwon ft. Chingy, Murphy Lee and DJ Clue)
- 2004: "River Don't Runnin'" (Nelly featuring Murphy Lee & Stephen Marley)
- 2004: "Getcha Getcha" (Nelly featuring Ali, Murphy Lee, & Kyjuan)
- 2007: "Work Dat, Twerk Dat" (Ali & Gipp ft. Murphy Lee and DJ Speedy)
- 2007: "Throw Some D's" (Remix) (Rich Boy ft. Lil' Jon, Andre 3000, Jim Jones, Nelly, Murphy Lee and The Game)
- 2007: "Do Them Bad" (Huey ft. Murphy Lee)
- 2007: Duffle Bag Boy (Remix) (Playaz Circle featuring Lil Wayne and Murphy Lee)
- 2009: "Think About It" (Darren B ft. Murphy Lee & Gena)
- 2010: "Drumma" (Aye Verb ft. Chingy, Murphy Lee & Jibbs)
- 2010: "Studda Step" (Unladylike ft. Murphy Lee)
- 2010: "Sell Out Everything" (DJ Freddy Fred ft. Young Buck, Murphy Lee & Gunplay)
- 2010: "k.I.s.s" (Nelly ft. Diddy-Dirty Money & Murphy Lee)
- 2011: "Kill Me" (Adore ft. Murphy Lee)
- 2012: "GO" (Nelly ft. Murphy Lee and City Spud)
- 2014: "The Reason Why" (Daz Dillinger ft. Short Khop, Young Buck, Bo$$ and Murphy Lee)
- 2022: "Call Me a Boss" (Heather Hobbs ft. Murphy Lee)
- 2024: "I'll Be on It" (Lady O ft. Murphy Lee)
- 2024: "That Shine" (Bone The Mack ft. Murphy Lee, Lil' Flip & W8ght)

=== Collaborations with St. Lunatics ===
- 2001: Free City (with St. Lunatics)

=== Mixtapes ===
- My Name Is Lee (2002)
- Batter Up (2007)
- The Return of SuperMan BigLee (2008)
