= Batter Up (St. Lunatics song) =

2001 single by St. Lunatics

Single by St. Lunatics featuring Nelly

from the album Country Grammar and Free City
- B-side: "Luven Me"
- Released: July 10, 2001
- Length: 5:27 (album version); 4:12 (radio edit)
- Label: Universal
- Composers: Jason Epperson; Steve Wills; Jeff Barry; Ja'Net DuBois
- Lyricist: Nelly
- Producer: Steve "Blast" Wills

Nelly singles chronology
"Where the Party At" (2001)	"Batter Up" (2001)	"#1" (2001)

St. Lunatics singles chronology
"Midwest Swing" (2001)	"Batter Up" (2001)	"Money Talks" (2010)

Music video
- "Batter Up" on YouTube

"Batter Up" is a song by American hip hop group St. Lunatics, with member Nelly credited as a featured artist. The track was produced by Steve "Blast" Wills and first appeared on Nelly's debut solo album, Country Grammar (2000). It was later included on the group's album Free City (2001) as a bonus track. A remixed version of "Batter Up" appears on Nelly's album Da Derrty Versions: The Reinvention (2003).

The song's hook interpolates "Movin' On Up", the theme song of the television sitcom The Jeffersons. The show's star Sherman Hemsley appears in the music video for "Batter Up", initially as a sports announcer and later dancing with members of St. Lunatics.

== Track listings ==
US 12-inch single

A1. "Batter Up" (clean version) – 5:27
A2. "Batter Up" (dirty version) – 5:27
A3. "Batter Up" (instrumental) – 5:27
B1. "Luven Me" (clean version) – 4:07
B2. "Luven Me" (dirty version) – 4:07
B3. "Luven Me" (instrumental) – 4:07

UK CD single

1. "Batter Up" (Full Phatt radio edit) – 4:05
2. "Batter Up" (album version) – 5:27
3. "Icey" – 4:14
4. "Batter Up" (video)

UK 12-inch single

A1. "Batter Up" (Full Phatt radio edit)
B1. "Batter Up" (album version)
B2. "Batter Up" (instrumental)

European CD single

1. "Batter Up" (radio edit) – 4:12
2. "Batter Up" (Full Phatt radio edit) – 4:07

Australasian CD single

1. "Batter Up" (radio edit) – 4:12
2. "Batter Up" (Full Phatt radio edit) – 4:07
3. "Batter Up" (instrumental) – 5:31
4. "Batter Up" (Corporate's Burnt Bean mix) – 4:41

== Charts ==
=== Weekly charts ===
Chart (2001–2002)	Peak position
Australia (ARIA)	19
Australian Urban (ARIA)	5
Belgium (Ultratip Bubbling Under Flanders)	8
Europe (Eurochart Hot 100)	94
Germany (GfK)	79
Ireland (IRMA)	30
Netherlands (Dutch Top 40)	37
Netherlands (Single Top 100)	31
Scottish Singles Sales (Official Charts)	37
Switzerland (Schweizer Hitparade)	75
UK Singles (Official Charts)	28
UK Dance (Official Charts)	12
UK Hip Hop/R&B (Official Charts)	4
US Hot R&B/Hip-Hop Songs (Billboard)	76
US Rhythmic Airplay (Billboard)	31

=== Year-end charts ===
Chart (2002)	Position
Australia (ARIA)	78

== Certifications ==
Region	Certification	Certified units/sales
Australia (ARIA)	Gold	35,000^{^}
United States (RIAA)	Gold	500,000^{‡}
^{^} Shipments figures based on certification alone.^{‡} Sales+streaming figures based on certification alone.

== Release history ==
Region	Date	Format(s)	Label(s)	Ref.
United States	July 10, 2001	Rhythmic contemporary; urban radio	Universal	
United States	July 31, 2001	Contemporary hit radio	Universal	
United Kingdom	September 3, 2001	12-inch vinyl; CD	Universal	
Australia	January 7, 2002	CD	Universal	
