= Shake Ya Tailfeather =

Single by Nelly, P. Diddy and Murphy Lee

from the album Bad Boys II: The Soundtrack and Murphy's Law
- Released: June 29, 2003
- Recorded: 2002–2003
- Genre: Crunk
- Length: 4:53
- Label: Bad Boy; Universal
- Songwriters: Cornell Haynes, Tohri Harper, Sean Combs, Varick Smith, Basement Beats, Adonis Shropshire
- Producers: Nelly & Jayson "Koko" Bridges

Nelly singles chronology
"Pimp Juice" (2003)	"Shake Ya Tailfeather" (2003)	"Iz U" (2003)

P. Diddy singles chronology
"Let's Get Ill" (2003)	"Shake Ya Tailfeather" (2003)	"Summertime" (2003)

Murphy Lee singles chronology
"Shake Ya Tailfeather" (2003)	"Wat Da Hook Gon Be" (2003)

"Shake Ya Tailfeather" is a song by American rappers Nelly, P. Diddy, and Murphy Lee. It was released in 2003 from the Bad Boys II Soundtrack. The song was also included on Lee's debut album, Murphy's Law. It topped the Billboard Hot 100, giving Nelly his third number one on the chart, Lee's first, and P. Diddy's fifth, making Diddy the rapper with the most number one hits on the chart at the time before being passed by Drake. The song won Best Rap Performance by a Duo or Group at the 46th Annual Grammy Awards.

== Music video ==
The video (directed by Benny Boom) features appearances by Esther Baxter and future June 2004 Playboy Playmate Hiromi Oshima. The song features the Florida State Seminoles/Atlanta Braves/Kansas City Chiefs Tomahawk Chop "War Chant". The video starts with all three of them eating and talking in a dining stall. Nelly raps the first verse and the bridge, P. Diddy raps verse two and Murphy Lee raps the third verse. In the chorus, Nelly and P. Diddy take turns rapping in each line, with the "War Chant" melody in the background. The music video premiered on July 8, 2003.

== Track listing ==
US promo

1. "Shake Ya Tailfeather" (main edit) – 4:57
2. "Shake Ya Tailfeather" (instrumental) – 4:45

Europe promo

1. "Shake Ya Tailfeather" (radio edit) – 4:02
2. "Shake Ya Tailfeather" (album version) – 4:57

Europe single

1. "Shake Ya Tailfeather" (radio edit) – 4:02
2. "Shake Ya Tailfeather" (album version) – 4:57
3. Loon – "Relax Your Mind" – 4:19

Europe 12" vinyl

A. "Shake Ya Tailfeather" (main)
B1. "Shake Ya Tailfeather" (instrumental)
B2. "Shake Ya Tailfeather" (single version)

== Charts ==
=== Weekly charts ===
Chart (2003)	Peak position
Australia (ARIA)	3
Australian Urban (ARIA)	10
Austria (Ö3 Austria Top 40)	29
Belgium (Ultratop 50 Flanders)	22
Belgium (Ultratop 50 Wallonia)	37
Canada (Nielsen SoundScan)	16
Croatia (HRT)	9
Denmark (Tracklisten)	9
Germany (GfK)	26
Ireland (IRMA)	13
Italy (FIMI)	19
Netherlands (Dutch Top 40)	20
Netherlands (Single Top 100)	21
New Zealand (Recorded Music NZ)	3
Norway (VG-lista)	7
Romania (Romanian Top 100)	75
Scotland Singles (OCC)	14
Sweden (Sverigetopplistan)	17
Switzerland (Schweizer Hitparade)	10
UK Singles (OCC)	10
UK Hip Hop/R&B (OCC)	6
US Billboard Hot 100	1
US Dance/Mix Show Airplay (Billboard)	28
US Hot R&B/Hip-Hop Songs (Billboard)	3
US Hot Rap Songs (Billboard)	1
US Pop Airplay (Billboard)	1
US Rhythmic Airplay (Billboard)	1

=== Year-end charts ===
Chart (2003)	Position
Australia (ARIA)	21
New Zealand (Recorded Music NZ)	34
Switzerland (Schweizer Hitparade)	48
US Billboard Hot 100	13
US Hot R&B/Hip-Hop Songs (Billboard)	28

== Certifications ==
Region	Certification	Certified units/sales
Australia (ARIA)	Platinum	70,000^{^}
New Zealand (RMNZ)	Gold	5,000^{*}
United States (RIAA)	Gold	500,000^{*}
^{*} Sales figures based on certification alone.^{^} Shipments figures based on certification alone.
