= St. Lunatics =

American hip hop group

- Origin: St. Louis, Missouri, U.S.
- Genres: Hip hop
- Years active: 1993–2010
- Labels: Derrty; Universal
- Spinoffs: Ali & Gipp
- Past members: Nelly; Murphy Lee; Ali; City Spud; Kyjuan; Slo Down

St. Lunatics were an American hip hop group formed in St. Louis, Missouri, in 1993. The group consisted of childhood friends Nelly, Ali, Murphy Lee, Kyjuan, City Spud, and Slo Down.

Their first single, "Gimme What U Got", gained popularity in 1996. In 2000, the group signed with Universal Records. Their debut album, Free City, was released after Nelly's solo breakthrough, achieving Platinum status in the U.S. Members of St. Lunatics pursued solo careers, and Nelly opened a music production school. An anticipated album in 2009, City Free, was never released. City Spud served a prison term for a robbery-related crime and later performed with Nelly at the 2023 Grammy Awards.

== History ==
After graduating from high school, the band members were working day jobs in the service industry or attending college. St. Lunatics' first local independent hit was "Gimme What U Got", released in 1996. In 1997, DJ Kut on the Beat FM started playing the single locally, generating interest in the group. In 2000, Nelly was signed to Universal Records, followed by the rest of the group. While Nelly was working on his solo album Country Grammar, City Spud was arrested and sentenced to ten years in prison for robbery. After Nelly's breakthrough success in 2000, St. Lunatics released their debut album, Free City. In 2001, the singles "Summer in the City" and "Midwest Swing" were released. Free City was certified Platinum in the United States and Gold in Canada.

In 2002, Ali issued his solo album Heavy Starch while Murphy Lee published Murphy's Law in 2003. Murphy later launched his own label, UC ME Entertainment. Nelly went on to have a successful solo career. In 2011, he partnered with St. Louis-based Vatterott College to open a music production school in downtown St. Louis, called Ex'treme Institute (E.I.).

In 2009, St. Lunatics were reportedly working on a new album, City Free, to be released that summer. The record was later postponed until 2011. A song titled "St. Lunatics" was leaked in early March 2009, along with "Get Low 2 Da Flo", which was produced by Play-N-Skillz. The first official single released from the album was "Money Talks", featuring rapper Birdman. The second single was "Polo". The record was never released, however.

After his release from prison, City Spud issued the solo mixtape Twelve-12, in 2010.

In 2023, City Spud performed "Hot in Herre" with Nelly at the 2023 Grammy Awards for the 50 Years of Hip-Hop showcase.

On September 19, 2024, the group filed a copyright infringement suit against Nelly for unpaid royalties and lack of credit on two albums (Nelly's Country Grammar and the group's Free City), seeking $50 million from the defendant. Murphy Lee, City Spud, and Kyjuan pulled out of the lawsuit shortly after it was filed, claiming "they didn't consent" to joining in the first place. Ali, the last remaining plaintiff, dropped the lawsuit on April 10, 2025.

=== City Spud's legal issues ===
Lavell Webb, known as City Spud, was a small-time marijuana dealer as a young adult. After quitting his job at a McDonald's in St. Louis County, he had little money. Webb and a conspirator came up with the plan to pretend to sell marijuana to someone, intending to rob them instead.

On the night of April 15, 1999, during a robbery, their victim ended up getting shot five times in the back, though he survived. Webb was charged with first-degree robbery, one count of first-degree assault, and two counts of armed criminal action. Despite only being a first-time offender, he was sentenced to ten years in prison.

== Discography ==
=== Studio albums ===
Year	Album details	Peak chart positions			Certifications (sales threshold)
Year	Album details	US	US R&B	CAN	Certifications (sales threshold)
2001	Free City: Release date: June 5, 2001; Label: Universal	3	1	18	RIAA: Platinum; MC: Gold

=== Compilations ===
Year	Album details	Peak chart positions	
Year	Album details	US	US R&B
2006	Who's the Boss: Release date: February 21, 2006; Label: Fast Life Music	114	28

=== Singles ===
Year	Single	Peak chart positions							Certification	Album
Year	Single	US	US R&B	AUS	GER	NED	SWI	UK	Certification	Album
1997	"Gimme What U Got"	—	—	—	—	—	—	—		Who's the Boss
2001	"Midwest Swing"	88	41	—	—	—	—	—		Free City
2001	"Batter Up" (featuring Nelly)	—	76	19	79	31	75	28	RIAA: Gold; ARIA: Gold	Free City
2010	"Money Talks" (featuring Birdman)	—	—	—	—	—	—	—		non-album single
"—" denotes releases that did not chart
