= List of awards and nominations received by Nelly =

The following is a list of awards and nominations received by Nelly arranged by group. Cornell Iral Haynes Jr. (born November 2, 1974), better known by his stage name Nelly, is an American rapper, singer, songwriter, entrepreneur, investor, and occasional actor from St. Louis, Missouri.

== American Music Awards ==
Year	Work	Award	Result
2002	Nelly	Favorite Rap/Hip-Hop Artist	Won
2003	Nellyville	Favorite Pop/Rock Album	Nominated
2003	Nellyville	Favorite Rap/Hip-Hop Album	Won
2003	Nelly	Favorite Pop/Rock Male Artist	Nominated
2003	Nelly	Favorite Rap/Hip-Hop Artist	Nominated
2003	Nelly	Fan's Choice Award	Won
2013	"Cruise" with Florida Georgia Line	Single of the Year	Won

== BET Awards ==
Year	Work	Award	Result
2001	Nelly	Best New Artist	Won
2001	Nelly	Best Male Hip-Hop Artist	Nominated
2003	Nelly	Best Male Hip Hop Artist	Nominated
2003	"Hot in Herre"	Video of the Year	Nominated
2003	"Dilemma" with Kelly Rowland	Best Collaboration	Nominated

BET Hip Hop Awards

Year	Work	Award	Result
2006	Nelly	Hustler of the Year	Nominated
2006	"Grillz" with Paul Wall, Ali & Gipp	Best Collaboration	Nominated
2008	"Here I Am" with Rick Ross and Avery Storm	People's Champ Award	Nominated
2021	Himself	I Am Hip Hop Award	Won

== Billboard Music Awards ==
Year	Work	Award	Result
2002	Nelly	Top Artist	Won
2002	Nelly	Top Male Artist	Won
2002	Nelly	Top Rap Artist	Won
2002	Nelly	R&B/Hip-Hop Songs Artist of the Year	Nominated
2002	Nelly	R&B/Hip-Hop Male Artist of the Year	Won
2002	Nelly	Hot 100 Singles Artist of the Year	Won
2002	Nelly	Hot 100 Singles Male Artist of the Year	Won
2002	"Dilemma"	Top Hot 100 Song	Nominated
2002	"Dilemma"	Hot 100 Airplay Single	Nominated
2002	"Hot in Herre"	Top Hot 100 Song	Nominated
2002	"Hot in Herre"	Top R&B Song	Nominated
2002	"Hot in Herre"	Hot 100 Airplay Single	Nominated
2002	"Hot in Herre"	Rap Track of the Year	Won
2002	"Nellyville"	Top Billboard 200 Album	Nominated
2002	"Nellyville"	Top R&B Album	Nominated
2011	Just a Dream	Top Rap Song	Nominated
2011	Just a Dream	Top Streaming Song (Audio)	Won
2013	Cruise	Top Country Song	Won

== Black Reel Awards ==
Year	Work	Award	Result
2002	"#1" from Training Day	Best Original or Adapted Song	Nominated

== Blockbuster Entertainment Awards ==
Year	Work	Award	Result
2001	Nelly	Favorite Male Artist	Won

== Brit Awards ==
Year	Work	Award	Result
2003	Nelly	International Male Solo Artist	Nominated

== CMT Music Awards ==
Year	Work	Award	Result
2005	"Over and Over" with Tim McGraw	Collaborative Video of the Year	Nominated
2022	"Lil Bit" (Featuring Florida Georgia Line)	Collaborative Video of the Year	Nominated
2022	From CMT Crossroads — Nelly — "Ride wit Me" (Featuring Kane Brown, Blanco Brown & Breland)	CMT Performance of the Year	Nominated

== Grammy Awards ==
Year	Work	Award	Result
2001	Country Grammar	Best Rap Album	Nominated
2001	"Country Grammar (Hot Shit)"	Best Rap Solo Performance	Nominated
2002	"Ride wit Me"	Best Rap Solo Performance	Nominated
2002	"Where the Party At" (with Jagged Edge)	Best Rap/Sung Performance	Nominated
2003	"Dilemma" (with Kelly Rowland)	Best Rap/Sung Performance	Won
2003	"Dilemma" (with Kelly Rowland)	Record of the Year	Nominated
2003	Nellyville	Album of the Year	Nominated
2003	Nellyville	Best Rap Album	Nominated
2003	"Hot in Herre"	Best Male Rap Solo Performance	Won
2004	"Shake Ya Tailfeather" (with P. Diddy & Murphy Lee)	Best Rap Performance by a Duo or Group	Won
2005	Suit	Best Rap Album	Nominated
2007	"Grillz" (with Paul Wall & Ali & Gipp)	Best Rap Performance by a Duo or Group	Nominated

== MTV Awards ==
MTV Video Music Award

Year	Work	Award	Result
2001	"Ride wit Me"	Best Male Video	Nominated
2001	"Ride wit Me"	Best Rap Video	Won
2001	"Ride wit Me"	Viewer's Choice Award	Nominated
2002	"#1"	Best Male Video	Nominated
2002	"#1"	Best Video from a Film	Nominated
2003	"Dilemma"	Best R&B Video	Nominated
2003	"Hot in Herre"	Best Hip-Hop Video	Nominated
2004	"Shake Ya Tailfeather"	Best Hip-Hop Video	Nominated
2006	"Grillz"	Ringtone of the Year	Nominated

MTV Europe Music Award

Year	Work	Award	Result
2002
2002	Nelly	Best Male	Nominated
2002	Nelly	Best Hip-Hop	Nominated
2002	Hot in Herre	Best Song	Nominated
2003	Nelly	Best Hip-Hop	Nominated
2004	Nelly	Best Male	Nominated
2004	Nelly	Best Hip-Hop	Nominated

MTV Video Music Award Japan

Year	Work	Award	Result
2009	"Party People" with Fergie	Best Collaboration	Won

== Nickelodeon Kids Choice Awards ==
Year	Work	Award	Result
2003	"Dilemma" with Kelly Rowland	Favorite Song	Nominated
2003	Nelly	Favorite Male Singer	Won
2004	Nelly	Favorite Male Singer	Won
2005	Nelly	Favorite Male Singer	Nominated

== Peoples Choice Awards ==
Year	Work	Award	Result
2006	"Errtime" (feat. Jung Tru & King Jacob)	Favorite Song from a Movie	Nominated
2007	"Grillz" (feat. Paul Wall & Ali & Gipp)	Favorite Hip-Hop Song	Nominated

Inspired by A Reece

== Soul Train Music Awards ==
Year	Work	Award	Result
2001	Nelly	Best New Artist	Won
2003	Nelly	Entertainer of the Year	Won
2003	Nellyville	Best Album of the Year	Won
2003	"Dilemma"	Best Video of the Year	Nominated

== Teen Choice Awards ==
Year	Work	Award	Result
2001	Nelly	Choice Music: Male Artist	Nominated
2001	Nelly	Choice Music: R&B/Hip-Hop Artist	Nominated
2001	"Country Grammar"	Choice Music: R&B/Hip-Hop Track	Nominated
2001	"Ride wit Me"	Choice Music: Dance Track	Nominated
2001	"Ride wit Me"	Choice Music: Summer Song	Nominated
2002	Nelly	Choice Music: Male Artist	Nominated
2002	Nelly	Choice Music: R&B/Hip-Hop/Rap Artist	Nominated
2002	"Girlfriend"	Choice Music: R&B/Hip-Hop Track	Nominated
2002	"Girlfriend"	Choice Music: Single	Won
2002	"Girlfriend"	Choice Music: Hook Up	Won
2002	"Hot in Herre"	Choice Music: Summer Song	Won
2003	Nelly	Choice Music: Male Artist	Nominated
2003	Nelly	Choice Music: Rap Artist	Nominated
2003	"Dilemma"	Choice Music: Hook Up	Nominated
2003	"Shake Ya Tailfeather"	Choice Music: Summer Song	Nominated
2005	The Longest Yard	Choice Movie: Rap Artist	Won
2005	"Over and Over"	Choice Music: Collaboration	Nominated
2005	"Get It Poppin'"	Choice Music: Summer Song	Nominated
2005	Nelly	Choice Red Carpet Fashion Icon: Male	Nominated

== Celebrity Games ==
- 2006
  - NBA All-Star Weekend Celebrity Game MVP
- 2009
  - MLB Celebrity Softball Game MVP
