= 32nd People's Choice Awards =

Pop culture award show held in 2006

- Date: January 10, 2006
- Location: Shrine Auditorium, Los Angeles, California
- Hosted by: Craig Ferguson

Television/radio coverage
- Network: CBS

The 32nd People's Choice Awards, honoring the best in popular culture for 2005, were held on January 10, 2006 at the Shrine Auditorium in Los Angeles, California. They were hosted by Craig Ferguson and broadcast on CBS.

== Awards ==
Winners are listed first, in bold. Other nominees are in alphabetical order.

Favorite New TV Comedy	Favorite Song from a Movie
**My Name Is Earl**; How I Met Your Mother; Everybody Hates Chris	**These Boots Are Made for Walkin' by Jessica Simpson, The Dukes of Hazzard**; 1 Thing by Amerie, Hitch; Errtime by Nelly, The Longest Yard
Favorite Movie Drama	Favorite Funny Male Star
**Star Wars: Episode III – Revenge of the Sith**; Coach Carter; Batman Begins	**Adam Sandler**; Chris Rock; Will Smith
Favorite Male Action Star	Favorite Movie
**Matthew McConaughey – Sahara**; Brad Pitt – Mr. & Mrs. Smith; Dwayne Johnson – Doom	**Star Wars: Episode III – Revenge of the Sith**; Batman Begins; Hitch
Favorite Male TV Star	Favorite Tour
**Ray Romano – Everybody Loves Raymond**; Charlie Sheen – Two and a Half Men; Kiefer Sutherland – 24	**U2**; Green Day; Paul McCartney
Favorite Late Night Talk Show Host	Favorite Female Musical Performer
**Jay Leno**; David Letterman; Conan O'Brien	**Kelly Clarkson**; Faith Hill; Gwen Stefani
Favorite Motion Picture Actor	Favorite Male Musical Performer
**Johnny Depp – Charlie and the Chocolate Factory**; Nicolas Cage – Lord of War and The Weather Man; Denzel Washington	**Tim McGraw**; Toby Keith; Jordan Cahill; Usher
Favorite TV Comedy	Favorite Funny Female
**Everybody Loves Raymond**; That '70s Show; The Simpsons	**Ellen DeGeneres**; Drew Barrymore; Queen Latifah
Favorite Family Movie	Favorite Motion Picture Actress
**Charlie and the Chocolate Factory**; Chicken Little; Madagascar	**Sandra Bullock – Crash and Miss Congeniality 2: Armed and Fabulous**; Angelina Jolie – Mr. & Mrs. Smith; Nicole Kidman – Bewitched and The Interpreter
Favorite Movie Comedy	Favorite TV Drama
**Wedding Crashers**; Hitch; The Longest Yard	**CSI: Crime Scene Investigation**; Desperate Housewives; Law & Order: SVU
Favorite Musical Group Or Band	Favorite Talk Show
**Green Day**; The Black Eyed Peas; Destiny's Child	**The Ellen DeGeneres Show**; Live with Regis and Kelly; The Oprah Winfrey Show
Favorite Female TV Performer	Nice 'n Easy Fans Favorite Hair
**Jennifer Garner – Alias**; Teri Hatcher – Desperate Housewives; Jennifer Love Hewitt – Ghost Whisperer	**Faith Hill**; Jennifer Garner; Nicole Kidman
Favorite Realty Show Other	Favorite Leading Actor
**Extreme Makeover: Home Edition**; Extreme Makeover; Supernanny	**Brad Pitt**; Jamie Foxx; Adam Sandler
Olay Total Effects Fans Favorite Look	Favorite Leading Actress
**Jennifer Aniston**; Angelina Jolie; Reese Witherspoon	**Reese Witherspoon – Just Like Heaven and Walk the Line**; Cameron Diaz – In Her Shoes; Renée Zellweger – Cinderella Man
Favorite On-Screen Match-Up	Favorite Reality Show Competition
**Vince Vaughn & Owen Wilson, Wedding Crashers**; Angelina Jolie & Brad Pitt, Mr. & Mrs. Smith; Chris Rock & Adam Sandler, The Longest Yard	**American Idol**; Fear Factor; Survivor
Crest Whitestrips Fans Favorite Smile	Favorite Female Action Star
**Cameron Diaz**; Drew Barrymore; Queen Latifah	**Jennifer Garner – Elektra**; Angelina Jolie – Mr. & Mrs. Smith; Catherine Zeta-Jones – The Legend of Zorro
Favorite New TV Drama
**Prison Break**; Commander in Chief; Criminal Minds
