= The Champ (Nelly song) =

Single by Nelly

from the album M.O.
- Released: December 20, 2011
- Recorded: 2011
- Genre: Hip hop
- Length: 3:09
- Label: Universal Records
- Songwriters: Cornell Haynes, Jr., Andrew Thielk, Eduardo Montilla
- Producers: Drew Money, Eddie Montilla

Nelly singles chronology
"Lose Control (Let Me Down)" (2011)	"The Champ" (2011)	"Hey Porsche" (2013)

Music video
- "The Champ" on YouTube

"The Champ" is a song performed by American hip hop artist Nelly. It was released on December 20, 2011 digitally for ESPN's bowl coverage.

== Music video ==
ESPN filmed a full-length video of Nelly performing the song to accompany various game highlight montages surrounding the telecasts. It was primarily filmed at Florida International's FIU Stadium, or "The Cage", in Miami, and was released on December 20, 2011.

== Charts ==
Chart (2012)	Peak position
Australia (ARIA)	64
Slovakia (Rádio Top 100)	48
South Korea International Singles (Gaon)	3
US Billboard Hot 100	61
