= Pimp Juice (drink) =

Energy drink

- Type: Energy Drink
- Manufacturer: Fillmore Street Brewery
- Origin: USA
- Introduced: 2003
- Related products: Cocaine, Monster Energy

Pimp Juice is the brand name of a non-carbonated energy drink co-owned by Nelly and inspired by his song "Pimp Juice". Produced by Fillmore Street Brewery, in St. Louis, Missouri, Pimp Juice is marketed as "Hip-Hop's #1 Energy Drink."

Pimp Juice was one of the first celebrity-driven energy drinks on the market, an example of hip hop and pop stars using their appeal to younger audiences to market and sell non–music-related products.

The drink contains 100 percent of the recommended daily intake of vitamins C, B_{2}, B_{3}, B_{5}, B_{6}, and B_{12}, as well as 7 mg of taurine. The drink is intended to taste like apples and berries and is commonly used as mixer in alcoholic beveragess such as vodka and rum. Two follow-up drinks have been released: PJ Tight (a low-carb variant) and PJ Purple Label (flavored with grape and prickly pear).

When released, Pimp Juice was a source of controversy after a number of community groups called for a national boycott of the product for allegedly glorifying and promoting a negative stereotype of African-American lifestyle.

Pimp Juice is still sold online from an Australian site, but consumers outside Australia are asked to send email and inquire about availability.

== Ingredients ==
Ingredients are water, high-fructose corn syrup and/or sucrose, apple juice concentrate, citric acid, natural flavor, d-ribose, malic acid, ascorbic acid, inositol, maltodextrin, guarana seed extract, niacin, calcium pantotherate, taurine, pyridoxine hydrochloride, yellow #5, riboflavin, blue #1, cyanocobalamin.

=== Nutrition information ===
Ingredient	Amount	% daily value*
Calories	130 Cal	6.5
Calories from fat	0	0
Total fat	0	0%
Sodium	5 mg	0%
Total carbohydrates	35 g	12%
Protein	0	0%
Vitamin C	2000 mg	100%
Vitamin B_{3}	16 mg	100%
Vitamin B_{12}	2.4 μg	100%
Vitamin B_{6}	1.3 mg	100%
Vitamin B_{5}	5 mg	100%
*Per can, values based on a 2,000 calories per day diet.

== Origins ==
The first case of Pimp Juice Energy Drink was produced and shipped in August 2003 by Fillmore Street Brewery, a St. Louis, Missouri, company partially owned by Cornell Haynes, Jr., also known as Nelly. The Pimp Juice team was driven by Nelly himself and organized by former Fillmore Street Brewery president Demetrius Denham.

Pimp Juice started as a mostly regional product, with distribution limited to the Midwest (Missouri, Oklahoma, Arkansas, Illinois and Michigan), but expanded nationally quickly to meet the demand created by national media coverage.

The original Pimp Juice brand identity, packaging, website, and marketing materials were developed by branding agency Project 13 for the product’s 2003 launch

Since 2003, Pimp Juice has expanded internationally into Europe, Australia, Southeast Asia, the Middle East, and South Africa.

== Controversy ==
Pimp Juice made national headlines when several cultural groups and women's organizations, including Project Islamic H.O.P.E., the National Alliance For Positive Action, the National Black Anti-Defamation League and the Messianic Afrikan Nation, called for a national boycott of Pimp Juice Energy Drink and all stores that carried the product.

Naji Ali, the director of Project Islamic H.O.P.E., one of the leaders of the boycott, stated that the drink "Contributes to negative and demeaning stereotypes of African-Americans", while others said that the name "degrades women and glorifies a pimp lifestyle". Paul Scott of the Afrikan Nation has also expressed concerns that the drink promotes the wrong leadership and lifestyle that is required in the black community.

Demetrius Denham, co-founder of Fillmore Street Brewery, was one of the first to speak out publicly in defense of Pimp Juice when he told BET.com "the term pimp has changed meaning over the years and doesn't have the same connotation to youth. I think it's a word that has changed significance over the last 10 to 15 years".

Nelly defended the product as "Pimp Juice is anything that attracts the opposite sex; it could be money, fame, or straight intellect; it don't matter! Pimp Juice is color blind; you find it works on all colors, creeds and kinds; from ages 50 right down to nine." He noted that a portion of the proceeds from the drink will go to his philanthropic organization, 4Sho4Kids.

While these protests created a storm of negative media coverage, they did little to slow the sales of Pimp Juice. A company spokeswoman said the company sold over one million cans of Pimp Juice within the first three months of operations.

== See also ==
- Apple Bottoms
