= 5.0 =

Studio album by Nelly
- Released: November 12, 2010
- Studios: Hit Factory Recording Studios, The Hit Factory Criteria, Parkland Playhouse, Circle House Recording Studios, Derrty Recording Studios, Playland Playhouse (Miami, Florida); Chalice Studios, No Excuses Studios, Dr. Luke's (Los Angeles, California); Silent Sounds Studios, The Surgery Room (Atlanta, Georgia)
- Genres: Hip-hop; pop; R&B
- Length: 46:06
- Labels: Derrty; Universal Motown; Universal
- Producers: Infamous; The Smash Factory; Mr. Bangladesh; Dr. Luke; Blade; Danny Morris; Don Vito; E; Earl Hood; Uriel "Frenchie" Kadouch; Jim Jonsin; Laurent Cohen; Multiman; Polow da Don; Rico Love; The Runners; Trife Trizzil

Nelly chronology
Brass Knuckles (2008)	5.0 (2010)	M.O. (2013)

Singles from 5.0
- 1. "Just a Dream" Released: August 16, 2010; 2. "Move That Body" Released: October 12, 2010; 3. "Gone" Released: January 4, 2011 (Radio)

5.0 is the sixth studio album by American rapper Nelly. It was released through Universal Motown Records and Derrty on November 12, 2010. The album features guest appearances from Kelly Rowland, Keri Hilson, DJ Khaled, Baby, Sophie Greene, Ali, Plies, Chris Brown, T.I., Yo Gotti, T-Pain, Akon, Talib Kweli, Avery Storm, Murphy Lee, Dirty Money and Sean Paul while production was handled by Infamous, Dr. Luke, Mr. Bangladesh, Jim Jonsin, Multiman, Polow da Don, Rico Love and The Runners, among others. 5.0 is predominately a hip-hop and pop music album with subtle influences of R&B.

The album received mixed reviews, with some critics praising its mainstream appeal and hit-making potential as a return to familiar strengths, while others criticized it as mediocre and lacking the credibility and creativity of Nelly's earlier work. 5.0 debuted at ten on the US Billboard 200, selling over 65,000 copies in its first week domestically. Its lead single, "Just a Dream" became the only song from 5.0 to earn mainstream radio airplay and significantly impact worldwide charts. Released on August 16, 2010, it peaked at number three on the US Billboard Hot 100.

== Background ==
On July 8, 2009, Nelly made a public announcement in Las Vegas that he was recording a new album. He would tell DJ Semtex that he was planning to release a self-titled album in the first quarter of 2010. In an interview with MTV's Shaheem Reid, the rapper said he was fuelled by the lukewarm reception of his previous albums to produce something better.

As an artist, you want to wake up every day and feel like you're doing something people don't think you can do. Now I feel like I've been put in that position again, where it's more doubt than expectancy. The doubt is what fuels me, so to speak. I've been real fortunate where I have great people around me. Everybody wants to freakin' work with me – not that everybody didn't [before], but it's different because I didn't work with a lot of people. Coming into this situation, it's beautiful.

The rapper T.I. features in a track on the album ("She So Fly"), produced by 1500 or Nothin' of The Smash Factory, according to a video in the studio. Hoping to recreate the success of their 2002 Billboard chart-topping single "Dilemma", Nelly has also worked with Kelly Rowland for the sequel ("Gone"), produced by Jim Jonsin and Rico Love. He has collaborated with actress/singer Taraji P. Henson on a Jermaine Dupri-produced song, however it was confirmed later that Taraji was unable to perform on the record.

== Title ==
On June 3, 2010, Nelly announced that the album would be titled Nelly 5.0. The title was inspired by his 2011 Ford Mustang, which is also on the album artwork. He said:

It's a lot of things. It's also my fifth drop date. It's just the energy of it all. The Mustang [5.0] was always one of my dream cars. As soon as I had enough money to buy one of these mothaf–, they stopped making these shits. It was just like, "Ahhh!" You know in Menace II Society when he jacked that ride? And then they came back... That was like the ultimate scene. I always wanted one of them mothaf–, money green. But when I got a chance, they stopped making them. I had this meeting with Ford where they asked me these random questions about cars and I just got to talking it up. I was like, "Why ya'll ain't brought back the 5.0 Mustang? That shit was hot!

== Singles ==
The album's lead single "Just a Dream", was released August 16, 2010 to iTunes Stores around the world for digital download. It was released to Mainstream and Rhythm/Crossover radio on August 10, 2010. "Just a Dream" made its first chart appearance debuting on the US Billboard Hot 100 at number 12 and peaking at number 3 in its eighth week. The song also debuted at number 8 on the Billboard Digital Songs chart, selling 135,000 downloads in its first week. "Just a Dream" is Nelly's highest-charting song since his 2005 single "Grillz" and debuted at number 22 on the Billboard Rap Songs. The song entered the Canadian Hot 100 in August 2010, at number 32. It debuted in Australia (ARIA Charts) on the Singles Chart at number 24, in New Zealand Singles Charts at number 29, and in Switzerland (Media Control AG) at number 52. The Sanji-directed music video premiered on Vevo on September 24, 2010.

The album's second single "Move That Body"; produced by Dr. Luke, along with Mr. Bangladesh and featuring guest appearances from Akon and T-Pain. The song was released for digital download on October 12, 2010. The song made its first chart appearance debuting on the US Billboard Hot 100 at number 54 and has reached a current peak at number 29 in Australia. The music video for the single was directed by Marc Klasfeld.

The album's third single, titled "Gone" featuring guest appearance from singer Kelly Rowland. It was sent to urban and Urban AC stations on January 4, 2011. It will be sent to Top 40/Mainstream radio on January 18, 2011. On January 6, 2011, Nelly said on his Twitter, "new Nelly single... "Gone" featuring Kelly Rowland video coming very soon #5.0 :-)", the song is set to be released as the third official single from the album. The video for "Gone" was finally debuted to the public on March 12, 2011. In the United States, "Gone" peaked at a lowly number 59 on the Billboard Hot R&B/Hip-Hop Songs chart, but has so far fared better in international markets where it has so far charted in Australia and the UK.

=== Other songs ===
The Dutch-produced "Tippin' in da Club" was released as the album's promotional single on August 17, 2010. It is not included on the final track listing. The album's second promotional single "Long Gone" featuring Plies and Chris Brown, was released on November 9, 2010. In November 2010, the song "Liv Tonight" featuring Keri Hilson, which debuted at number 58 on the UK Singles Chart, number 74 on the Canadian Hot 100, and number 75 on the US Billboard Hot 100, without release as a single. On the week of June 12, 2011, the song returned to the UK Singles Chart at number 72. A week later, it made a new peak of number 52.

== Critical reception ==
Professional ratings
Aggregate scores
Source	Rating
Metacritic	52/100
Review scores
Source	Rating
AllMusic	2/5 stars
Entertainment Weekly	B
HipHopDX	1.5/5
RapReviews	7/10
Rolling Stone	2.5/5 stars
Slant Magazine	2/5 stars
Tom Hull – on the Web	B+
Uncut	4/10
USA Today	3/4 stars

Upon its release, 5.0 received generally mixed reviews from most music critics. At Metacritic, which assigns a normalized rating out of 100 to reviews from mainstream critics, the album received an average score of 52, based on nine reviews, which indicates "mixed or average reviews".

Simon Vozick-Levinson of Entertainment Weekly gave 5.0 a B rating and commented that "on 5.0 Nelly makes a reasonably convincing case that he can keep the momentum going. His lyrics are vacuous as ever, but those hooks sure are sticky." Mariel Concepcion from Billboard said that on "5.0, the rapper proves he still knows what it takes to make a solid, well-rounded album." Concepcion concluded her review by saying that "The 36-year-old artist gives fans the stuff they fell in love with 10 years ago on debut Country Grammar — and with a new pop-driven sound, he demonstrates he hasn't lost a beat." Ken Capobianco from The Boston Globe said that "Nelly has recruited an all-star supporting cast and emerged with a tuneful mainstream effort that should yield a number of hits." Capobianco said that "Just a Dream" "captures the design of many of these cuts: Hooks are prominent while Nelly's patented tricky flow is often smoothed out."

Chuck Eddy from Rolling Stone gave the album two and a half stars (out of five). He said that Nelly "essays a few fashionably global-sounding electro-club tracks, [...] and at least four numbers where he swipes guys' girlfriends. Keri Hilson and Kelly Rowland help him stretch out; Plies, Yo Gotti and T.I. add muscle." Writing for Slant Magazine, Jesse Cataldo wrote that 5.0 was "never overtly awful, but it definitely sinks into the zone of mediocrity occupied by so many mainstream rap albums, where they sit like dishes moldering beneath dirty water." He found that Nelly had lost his "charm and playfulness he began with" on the albums following Country Grammar, with 5.0 containing a "collection of collaborations with low-wattage names and also-rans, [that] basically indicates that even if Nelly is still trying (which he doesn't seem to be), he hasn't sustained the credibility to achieve a plausible comeback." Andy Kellman from AllMusic said that "nothing on the rapper’s sixth studio album encourages repeated listening". He felt that "Nelly’s exuberance often sounds feigned", the "rallying choruses are not effective, and he’s short on ideas". Kellman concluded his review by saying that 5.0 is "by a considerable margin, Nelly’s least essential release to date".

== Commercial performance ==
5.0 debuted at number 10 on the Billboard 200, selling 63,000 copies in its first week in the United States. It also entered at number 1 on the Billboard's Top Rap Albums and number 2 on the Top R&B/Hip-Hop Albums. The album debuted the same week on the Canadian Albums Chart at number 19. As of August 2013, the album has sold 314,000 copies in the United States. Following the album's relatively modest commercial performance compared to his previous efforts, Nelly publicly criticized Universal Motown for inadequate shipping and marketing, arguing that the label shared responsibility for the low sales despite the strong digital success of the lead single "Just a Dream."

== Track listing ==
Standard edition
No.	Title	Writer(s)	Producer(s)	Length
1.	"I'm Number 1" (featuring Baby and DJ Khaled)	Cornell Haynes, Jr.; Marco Rodriguez-Diaz; Bryan Williams	Infamous	3:32
2.	"Long Gone" (featuring Plies and Chris Brown)	Haynes, Jr.; Jamal Jones; Ester Dean; Algernod Washington; Christopher Brown; Micheal Claxton	Polow da Don	3:40
3.	"She's So Fly" (featuring T.I.)	Haynes, Jr.; Clifford Harris, Jr.; Lamar Edwards	1500 or Nothin'	3:21
4.	"Just a Dream"	Haynes, Jr.; James Scheffer; Richard Butler, Jr.; Frank Romano	Jim Jonsin; Rico Love	3:57
5.	"Making Movies"	Haynes, Jr.; Butler, Jr.; Earl Hood; Eric Goudy II	Love; Earl & E*	3:34
6.	"Move That Body" (featuring T-Pain and Akon)	Butler, Jr.; Shondrae Crawford; Lukasz Gottwald; Haynes, Jr.; Aliaune Thiam; Faheem Najm	Dr. Luke; Bangladesh	3:25
7.	"1000 Stacks"	Haynes, Jr.; Rags Richard; Brandon Bowles; Dave Grusin; Harvey Mason; Norman Glover; Reginald Ellis; Christopher Wallace; Christopher Martin; Jalacy Hawkins	Don Vito; Blade	4:10
8.	"Gone" (featuring Kelly Rowland)	Haynes, Jr.; Scheffer; Butler, Jr.; Hood; Goudy II	Jonsin; Love; Earl & E*	4:27
9.	"Don't It Feel Good"	Haynes, Jr.; Butler, Jr.; Hood; Goudy II	Love; Earl & E*	4:10
10.	"Broke" (featuring Yo Gotti and Sophie Greene)	Haynes, Jr.; Butler, Jr.; Hood; Goudy II	Love; Earl & E*	3:35
11.	"Liv Tonight" (featuring Keri Hilson)	Haynes, Jr.; Andrew Harr; Jermaine Jackson; Keri Hilson	The Runners	4:31
12.	"Nothing Without Her"	Scheffer; Butler, Jr.; Haynes, Jr.; Romano	Jonsin; Love; Mr. Morris	3:39
Total length:				46:06

Deluxe edition (bonus tracks)
No.	Title	Writer(s)	Producer(s)	Length
13.	"Go" (featuring Talib Kweli and Ali)	Haynes, Jr.; Uriel Kadouch; Kim Moeller; Keith Ross; Antonio McGuire; Insidore Lamother	Frenchie; Multiman	4:38
14.	"If I Gave U 1" (featuring Avery Storm)	Haynes, Jr.; Ralph Di Stasio	Trife Trizzil	4:27
15.	"k.I.s.s" (featuring Dirty Money and Murphy Lee)	Butler, Jr.; Hood; Goudy II; Haynes, Jr.; Torhi Harper; Julian Jackson; Brion James; Janice Johnson; Charles Wiggins	Love; Earl & E	3:44
Total length:				58:56

iTunes Store bonus track
No.	Title	Writer(s)	Producer(s)	Length
16.	"Giving Her the Grind" (featuring Sean Paul)	Haynes, Jr.; Laurent Cohen; Rodriguez-Diaz; Sean Henriques	Infamous; Slick	3:48
Total length:				62:45

Notes

- Track listing and credits from album booklet.
- (*) signifies a co-producer
- "Making Movies" and "Don't It Feel Good" features uncredited vocals by Rico Love.

Sample credits

- "Long Gone" contains a sample of "Let's Start Love Over", written by Micheal Claxton and performed by Miles Jaye.
- "1000 Stacks" contains a sample of "Everyday Struggle", written by Christopher Wallace, Dave Grusin, Harvey Mason, Norman Glover, Reginald Ellis, embodies portions of "Kick in the Door", written by Christopher Wallace, Christopher Martin and Jalacy Hawkins, both performed by The Notorious B.I.G. and uncredited vocals by Diddy.
- "k.I.s.s" contains portions of "Kissing You", written by Julian Jackson, Brion James, Janice Johnson and Charles Wiggins.

== Personnel ==
Adapted from AllMusic and album booklet.

Creativity

- Cornell Haynes Jr. (Nelly) – executive producer
- Marc Baptiste – photographer
- Sandy Brummels – art direction
- Ashaki Meyers – stylist
- Irene Richter – project co-ordination
- Seannita Parmer – stylist
- Megan Dennis – project co-ordination
- Christopher Kornmann – art direction

Performers

- Nelly – vocals, songwriting
- Rico Love – background vocals (Track 5 "Making Movies", Track 9 "Don't It Feel Good")
- Baby – guest vocal performance (Track 1 "I'm Number 1")
- DJ Khaled – guest vocal performance (Track 1 "I'm Number 1")
- Plies – guest vocal performance (Track 2 "Long Gone")
- Chris Brown – guest vocal performance (Track 2 "Long Gone")
- T.I. – guest vocal performance (Track 3 "She So Fly")
- T-Pain – guest vocal performance (Track 6 "Move That Body")
- Akon – guest vocal performance (Track 6 "Move That Body")
- Diddy – background vocals (Track 7 "1000 Stacks")
- Kelly Rowland – guest vocal performance (Track 8 "Gone")
- Yo Gotti – guest vocal performance (Track 10 "Broke")
- Sophie Greene – guest vocal performance (Track 10 "Broke")
- Keri Hilson – guest vocal performance (Track 11 "Liv Tonight")
- Talib Kweli – guest vocal performance (Track 13 "Go")
- Ali – guest vocal performance (Track 13 "Go")
- Avery Storm – guest vocal performance (Track 14 "If I Gave U 1")
- Dirty Money – guest vocal performance (Track 15 "k.I.s.s.")
- Murphy Lee – guest vocal performance (Track 15 "k.I.s.s.")
- Sean Paul – guest vocal performance (Track 16 "Giving Her the Grind")

Technical

- Marco Rodriguez-Diaz (Infamous) – bass, drums, guitar, percussion, producer, programming
- Polow da Don – producer, programming
- Carl Nappa – engineer, audio mixer
- Jeremy Stevenson – recording engineer
- Joshua Mosser – audio mixer, recording engineer
- The Smash Factory – producer, programming
- Elliot Carter – recording engineer
- James Scheffer (Jim Jonsin) – keyboards, producer, programming
- Richard Butler Jr. (Rico Love) – producer, programming, vocal producer
- Robert Marks – recording engineer, audio mixer
- Ryan Evans – recording engineer
- Jason Wilkie – recording assistant, mixing assistant
- Matt Huber – recording assistant, mixing assistant
- Chad Jolley – mixing assistant
- Frank Romano – guitar
- Thurston McCrea – recording assistant, additional engineering
- Brandon Jones – additional engineering
- Eric Goudy II (E) – keyboards, programming
- Earl Hood – programming, keyboards, producer
- Serban Ghenea – audio mixer
- Lukasz Gottwald (Dr. Luke) – instrumentation, producer, programming
- Shondrae Crawford (Mr. Bangladesh) – producer, composer, instrumentation, programming
- Venza Gottwald – assistant
- Brian Gardner – mastering engineer
- Emily Wright – engineer
- Chris "Tek" O'Ryan – engineer, vocal producer
- John Hanes – audio mixer
- Tim Roberts – assistant audio mixer
- Don Vito – producer, programming
- Blade– producer, recording engineer, programming
- Fabian Marasciullo – audio mixer
- Fareed Salamah – assistant
- Jermaine Jackson and Andrew Harr (The Runners) – instrumentation, producer, programming
- Jeff Villanueva (Supa Jeff) – engineer
- Danny Morris – keyboards, producer, programming
- Jim Bottari – engineer
- Diego Avendano – assistant
- Keith Ross – vocal producer
- Kim Elsberg (Multiman) – instrumentation, producer, engineer, programming
- Uriel Kadouc (Frenchie) – programming, producer
- Trife Trizzil – producer, percussion, drums, programming, engineer
- Jason Derouchie – mixing assistant
- Uncle Rudy Haynes – keyboards
- Laurent Cohen – recording engineer, producer, programming, keyboards
- Chris Gehringer – mastering engineer

== Charts ==
=== Weekly charts ===
Weekly chart performance for 5.0
Chart (2010)	Peak position
Australian Albums (ARIA)	17
Canadian Albums (Billboard)	19
French Albums (SNEP)	131
German Albums (Offizielle Top 100)	63
Irish Albums (IRMA)	91
Japanese Albums (Oricon)	28
Scottish Albums (Official Charts)	75
Swiss Albums (Schweizer Hitparade)	52
UK Albums (Official Charts)	59
UK R&B Albums (Official Charts)	10
US Billboard 200	10
US Top R&B/Hip-Hop Albums (Billboard)	2
US Top Rap Albums (Billboard)	1

=== Year-end charts ===
Year-end chart performance for 5.0
Chart (2011)	Position
US Billboard 200	116
US Top R&B/Hip-Hop Albums (Billboard)	33

== Certifications ==
Certifications for 5.0
Region	Certification	Certified units/sales
New Zealand (RMNZ)	Gold	7,500^{‡}
^{‡} Sales+streaming figures based on certification alone.

== Release history ==
Release history and formats for 5.0
Region	Date	Edition	Format	Label	Ref.
Brazil	November 12, 2010	Standard; deluxe	digital download	Universal Music	
Czech Republic	November 12, 2010	Deluxe	CD; digital download	Universal Music	
Ireland	November 12, 2010	Standard; deluxe	digital download	Universal Music	
Sweden	November 15, 2010	Standard	CD; digital download	Universal Music	
Canada	November 16, 2010	Standard; deluxe	CD; digital download	Universal Music	
France	November 16, 2010	Standard	Digital download	Universal Motown	
New Zealand	November 16, 2010	Standard	CD; digital download	Universal Music	
United Kingdom	November 16, 2010	Standard	CD; digital download	Island Records	
United States	November 16, 2010	Standard; deluxe	CD; digital download	Universal Motown	
Australia	November 19, 2010	Standard; deluxe	CD; digital download	Universal Music	
Czech Republic	November 19, 2010	Standard	CD; digital download	Universal Music	
Germany	November 19, 2010	Standard; deluxe	CD; digital download	Universal Music	
Netherlands	November 19, 2010	Standard; deluxe	CD	Universal Music	
Japan	December 1, 2010	Standard; deluxe	CD; digital download	Universal Music	
