= Gone (Nelly song) =

2011 single by Nelly and Kelly Rowland

Single by Nelly featuring Kelly Rowland

from the album 5.0
- Released: January 4, 2011 (see radio and release history)
- Recorded: December 16, 2009
- Studio: Hit Factory Criteria (Miami, FL)
- Genre: R&B
- Length: 4.27
- Label: Derrty, Universal Motown
- Songwriters: Cornell Haynes, Jr., Richard Butler, James Scheffer, Earl Hood, Eric Goody II
- Producers: Jim Jonsin, Rico Love

Nelly singles chronology
"Move That Body" (2010)	"Gone" (2011)	"Lose Control (Let Me Down)" (2011)

Kelly Rowland singles chronology
"Invincible" (2010)	"Gone" (2011)	"Motivation" (2011)

"Gone" is a song by American rapper and singer Nelly, released by Universal Motown Records on January 4, 2011 as the third from his sixth studio album, 5.0. A duet with fellow American singer Kelly Rowland, "Gone" is the sequel to Nelly's 2002 worldwide number one single "Dilemma"—which also featured Rowland—and was written as a continuum of the love story outlined in the song. "Gone" was written by Nelly and Rico Love, while its producers Eric Goudy II, Earl Hood (credited in twosome as "Earl & E") and Jim Jonsin are also credited as co-writers.

The predominantly R&B-ballad contains elements of pop music. "Gone" was initially titled as "Dilemma p.2", but Nelly stopped referring to the song as a "Dilemma" sequel for fear that it would not match people's expectations, and he desired for "Gone" to be recognized as a separate recording. It was sent to U.S. Urban/Urban AC radio stations on January 4, 2011, and top 40/mainstream stations on January 19, 2011.

The song failed to match the critical and commercial success of "Dilemma" and 5.0's lead single, "Just a Dream". It failed to reach the Billboard Hot 100, though it moderately entered the Hot R&B/Hip-Hop Songs, Rhythmic and Bubbling Under Hot 100 charts. Critics generally praised "Gone" for reusing the best elements of "Dilemma" and recapturing the same sentiments, though there was some negative reception towards the relevance of the sequel duet and lack of distinction in the song's R&B feel.

== Background and inspiration ==
"Gone" is a ballad written by Eric Goudy II, Nelly, Earl Hood, Rico Love and Jim Jonsin as the sequel to Nelly and Rowland's 2002 duet "Dilemma". Initially known as its working title, "DL Part 2", "Gone" extends the story of the duo's earlier single "Dilemma". Nelly told Jayson Rodriguez, from MTV, that "Gone" was not just a sequel. He said

"I don't want to say it's a sequel. I don't want to diminish anything with 'Dilemma' or have an expectation you can't live up to when you do that. When you do that type of thing, there's people who are already, 'I don't wanna hear it... It's one of those things where we did reconnect. Our chemistry has already proven to be good, whether it was onstage or in the studio. It was something that we wanted to reconnect with. It was produced by Jim Jonsin. ... It's a cool joint. I think people will get it."

It was recorded in May–June 2010 during studio sessions where Rowland and Nelly were recording the urban remix of the song "Commander", lead single of Rowland's third album, Here I Am. Rap-Up magazine described it as the "smooth sequel" which picks up "where 'Dilemma' left off", catering to both R&B and pop audiences. MTV revealed that the song would be a future single, but would not hit airwaves yet due to Nelly's success with "Just a Dream", the lead single from his sixth album, 5.0. The single cover from "Gone" was unveiled on January 19, 2011.

== Composition ==
"Gone" is a mid-tempo R&B-ballad produced by Rico Love and Jim Jonsin. On December 26, 2009, some studio footage of the recording of "Gone" was released through Rap-Up.com. Later in an MTV interview, Nelly was keen to stress that he didn't see "Gone" as a sequel to "Dilemma". He said "It can never be 'Dilemma,' but we wanted to extend the story. It's continuing the story a little bit more, seeing her [(Kelly)] again." Scott Schetler from AOL Radio Blog noted that in "Gone", Rowland and Nelly address each other by their first names, just as they did in their 2002 duet, "Dilemma". Bill Ohms from Lumino Magazine said Nelly's vocal styling on "Gone" was "ballad-like singing/rapping", while Tolu Akinsanya from Soulculture.co.uk noted that "Gone" uses the same key elements of production as "Dilemma". At one point Nelly directly references the lyrics from "Dilemma" when he says "remember that chick that used to live right up the block from me?".

== Critical reception ==
AOL Radio's Scott Schetler called "Gone" another "stellar duet" from Rowland and Nelly. Tolu Akinsanya from Soulculture.co.uk agreed with the comparisons to "Dilemma" by saying that "'[Gone]' uses all the key elements that made the '[Dilemma]' a hit, and does not fail. This track could easily be a chart-topper." Mariel Concepcion from Billboard said that no Nelly album would be complete with the emo track, "Gone". Ken Capobianco from The Boston Globe called "Gone" the melodic companion to "Dilemma". Robbie Daw from Idolator was less impressed. Though he praised the idea of the duet he said "This new slow groove is harmless enough, and even boasts a similar beat to its predecessor. But overall, we can’t help feeling that, since they bothered, these two should have come up with something a little better than a pale retread." Jesse Cataldo from Slant Magazine also had criticism for the song saying that its featured "R&B vocals sink steadily toward irrelevance".

== Chart performance ==
On January 21, 2011, "Gone" was the second most added single to Urban radio and third most added to Top 40/Mainstream and Rhythmic stations. The single racked up a total of forty-five adds in the two-day period since release. For the charts issued on February 5, 2011, "Gone" made its U.S. Hot R&B/Hip-Hop Songs debut at number seventy-nine and has currently peaked at number fifty-nine. In terms of the Billboard Hot 100, the song completely missed the chart, becoming a failure mainstream and only being moderately successful on the R&B charts. In South Korea, "Gone" sold 113,258 units.

== Music video ==
On January 6, 2011, Nelly said on his Twitter, "new Nelly single... "Gone" featuring Kelly Rowland video coming very soon 5.0", the song is set to be released as the third official single from the album. In February 2011, it was revealed that Marc Klasfeld had been booked to shoot the video. Klasfeld has previously worked with both artists, on Nelly's "Country Grammar" and "Ride wit Me," as well as working with Rowland on Destiny's Child's "Lose My Breath". The shoot took place in Mexico. The video began production on February 8, 2011 on a sandy beach in country.

Photos uploaded to Rap-Up.com show Rowland wearing a low-cut shimmering black dress while Nelly wears a button down black jacket. A snippet of the video was shown on Monday, March 7 during the premiere of Nelly's episode of Behind the Music.

== Charts ==
Chart (2011)	Peak position
Australia (ARIA)	55
Australia Urban (ARIA)	21
Japan (Japan Hot 100)	76
South Korea International (Circle)	8
UK Singles (Official Charts)	58
UK Hip Hop/R&B (Official Charts)	19
US Bubbling Under Hot 100 (Billboard)	13
US Hot R&B/Hip-Hop Songs (Billboard)	59
US Rhythmic Airplay (Billboard)	23

== Radio and release history ==
Region	Date	Format
United States	January 4, 2011	Urban, Urban AC
United States	January 18, 2011	Mainstream, Rhythmic
United Kingdom	April 4, 2011	Urban radio
United Kingdom	May 8, 2011	Impact day
