= Vokal =

Vokal may refer to:

- Vermont Organization of Koha Automated Libraries, a unified library catalog used by over fifty libraries in Vermont
- Vokal (fashion brand)
