= Multi Man =

Multi-Man is a DC Comics supervillain.

Multi Man or Multi-Man may also refer to:

- Multi Man, a Hanna-Barbera superhero in the animated television series The Impossibles
- Multiman (born 1958), Danish-American record producer and songwriter
- Multi-Man Publishing, an American game company

== See also ==
- Multiple Man, or Jamie Madrox, a Marvel Comics superhero
