= Get Like Me =

Get Like Me may refer to:

- "Get Like Me" (David Banner song), 2008
- "Get Like Me" (Nelly song), 2013
- "Get Like Me", 2019 song by Bhad Bhabie
