= Move That Body (Nelly song) =

2010 single by Nelly featuring T-Pain and Akon

Single by Nelly featuring T-Pain and Akon

from the album 5.0
- Released: October 12, 2010
- Recorded: 2010
- Length: 3:24
- Label: Derrty Ent.; Universal Motown
- Songwriters: Cornell Haynes, Jr.; Faheem Najm; Aliaune Thiam; Shondre Crawford
- Producers: Bangladesh; Dr. Luke

Nelly singles chronology
"Just a Dream" (2010)	"Move That Body" (2010)	"Gone" (2011)

T-Pain singles chronology
"Rap Song" (2010)	"Move That Body" (2010)	"No Dejemos Que se Apague" (2010)

Akon singles chronology
"Angel" (2010)	"Move That Body" (2010)	"Hold My Hand" (2010)

"Move That Body" is a song by American rapper Nelly. The song features T-Pain and Akon, and was produced by Bangladesh with Dr. Luke. It was released on October 12, 2010, and served as the second single from Nelly's sixth studio album, 5.0. The song received negative reviews from various hip hop critics and fans centered on stale production and use of auto-tune.

== Music video ==
A music video was shot on October 6, 2010. The video premiered on October 19 on VEVO. In the "sizzling" clip, Nelly goes to an underground fight-style dance club, meeting up with Akon and T-Pain who make bets with fellow rappers T.I., Yo Gotti, producers Bangladesh and Jermaine Dupri on the sidelines, as various ladies are seen dancing. The video was directed by Marc Klasfeld.

== Chart performance ==
"Move That Body" became a major disappointment on the charts by debuting at number 54 on the Billboard Hot 100 and falling off the chart the week after. The same reception happened to the single on the ARIA charts when it debuted at number 29 and also fell off the week after.

== Charts ==
Chart (2010)	Peak position
Australia (ARIA)	29
UK Singles Chart (OCC)	71
UK R&B Chart (OCC)	24
US Billboard Hot 100 (Billboard)	54

== Release history ==
List of release dates, record label and format details
Country	Date	Format	Label
United States	October 12, 2010	Digital download	Universal Motown
United Kingdom	January 31, 2011	Digital download	Universal Motown
