= Hey Porsche =

Single by Nelly

from the album M.O.
- Released: February 19, 2013
- Recorded: 2012
- Genre: Dance-pop; R&B
- Length: 3:29
- Label: Universal Motown; Derrty
- Songwriters: Cornell Haynes, Jr.; Justin Franks; David Glass; Breyan Isaac; Harrison Kipner
- Producer: DJ Frank E

Nelly singles chronology
| "The Champ" (2011) | "Hey Porsche" (2013) | "Cruise (Remix)" (2013) |

Music video
- "Hey Porsche" on YouTube

"Hey Porsche" is a song by American rapper Nelly, released as the lead single from his seventh studio album M.O. (2013). The song's music video, directed by Ethan Lader and featuring a vintage Porsche 356A convertible, was released on March 1, 2013. "Hey Porsche" peaked at number 42 on the Billboard Hot 100. Outside of the United States, "Hey Porsche" peaked within the top ten of the charts in Australia, Austria, Ireland, New Zealand, and the United Kingdom.

== Critical reception ==
Robert Copsey of Digital Spy gave the song a negative review, stating:

The genre in question is the ultra-radio-friendly-light-R&B-dance one that has already reached the darkest corners of the planet courtesy of Flo Rida. "Come and let me slide under so I can work on you," he tells his car/mistress over guitar strums synthesised to within an inch of their life. The result might be an easy smash, but it won't leave a lasting impression..

Drew Millard of the blog Noisey gave the song a positive review stating:

There is no way to get around it; this is an unabashed pop-country song and it's done with the skill and precision of someone who's been making skilled and precise pop-rap since before most of us hit puberty. Reaction to the song has been mixed, at best. Duncan Cooper at Fader started his blog post on it by saying, "This is not a good song," and then goes on to write a fairly comprehensive paragraph on the song anyway. Meanwhile on Noisey's British side, Ryan Bassil called it "terrible" and "amazing" in the span of two sentences. He's only half right, because "Hey Porsche" is nothing short of stunning, and if you don't fully understand that you are on the losing side of the culture war that is engulfing America. It's Wendesday [sic], and I'm already prepared to crown this the Best Thing I Heard This Week..

== Music video ==
A music video for the track was filmed in a desert outside of Los Angeles with Ethan Lader being the director. It premiered via Nelly's VEVO channel on March 1, 2013. The video features a vintage Porsche 356A convertible.

== Charts ==
=== Weekly charts ===
| Chart (2013–14) | Peak position |
|---|---|
| Australia (ARIA) | 5 |
| Austria (Ö3 Austria Top 40) | 5 |
| Belgium (Ultratip Bubbling Under Flanders) | 7 |
| Belgium (Ultratip Bubbling Under Wallonia) | 35 |
| Canada Hot 100 (Billboard) | 26 |
| Canada CHR/Top 40 (Billboard) | 28 |
| Canada Hot AC (Billboard) | 36 |
| Czech Republic Airplay (ČNS IFPI) | 15 |
| Euro Digital Songs (Billboard) | 10 |
| Germany (GfK) | 22 |
| Hungary (Rádiós Top 40) | 10 |
| Ireland (IRMA) | 8 |
| New Zealand (Recorded Music NZ) | 7 |
| Scotland Singles (OCC) | 14 |
| Slovakia Airplay (ČNS IFPI) | 33 |
| Switzerland (Schweizer Hitparade) | 34 |
| UK Singles (OCC) | 6 |
| US Billboard Hot 100 | 42 |
| US Pop Airplay (Billboard) | 24 |
| US Rhythmic Airplay (Billboard) | 35 |

=== Year-end charts ===
| Chart (2013) | Position |
|---|---|
| Australia (ARIA) | 44 |
| Austria (Ö3 Austria Top 40) | 57 |
| Germany (Official German Charts) | 80 |
| Hungary (Rádiós Top 40) | 91 |
| UK Singles (Official Charts Company) | 43 |

== Certifications ==
| Region | Certification | Certified units/sales |
|---|---|---|
| Australia (ARIA) | 2× Platinum | 140,000^{^} |
| Germany (BVMI) | Gold | 150,000^{‡} |
| New Zealand (RMNZ) | Platinum | 15,000^{*} |
| United Kingdom (BPI) | Gold | 400,000^{‡} |
^{*} Sales figures based on certification alone.^{^} Shipments figures based on certification alone.^{‡} Sales+streaming figures based on certification alone.

== Release history ==
| Region | Date | Format | Label |
|---|---|---|---|
| United States | February 5, 2013 | Mainstream airplay | Republic |
| United States | February 12, 2013 | Rhythmic airplay | Republic |
| United States | February 19, 2013 | Digital download | Universal Motown; Derrty |
