= Nellyville (TV series) =

- Genre: Reality
- Starring: Nelly
- Country of origin: United States
- Original language: English
- No. of seasons: 2
- No. of episodes: 21

Production
- Executive producers: John Morayniss; Tara Long; David Shaye; Howie Miller; Shanta Conic; Kim McKoy; Nelly
- Production company: Entertainment One

Original release
- Network: BET
- Release: November 25, 2014 – August 11, 2015

Nellyville is an American reality television series which airs on BET. The series debuted on November 25, 2014, and chronicles the life of American rapper Nelly and his family.

== Episodes ==
=== Season 1 (2014-15) ===
No. overall	No. in season	Title	Original release date	U.S. viewers (millions)
1	1	"Nelly's Girls"	November 25, 2014	N/A
2	2	"Nelly's Promise"	November 30, 2014	N/A
3	3	"Party Crasher"	December 2, 2014	N/A
4	4	"Double Trouble"	December 9, 2014	N/A
5	5	"Nelly In Hollywood"	December 16, 2014	N/A
6	6	"Nelly's Bahama Mama"	December 23, 2014	N/A
7	7	"License to Ride Wit Me"	December 30, 2014	N/A
8	8	"The Graduates"	December 30, 2014	N/A
9	9	"The Family Special"	January 20, 2015	N/A

=== Season 2 (2015) ===
No. overall	No. in season	Title	Original release date	U.S. viewers (millions)
10	1	"We All We Got"	May 5, 2015	N/A
11	2	"Steppin' to the Mic"	May 12, 2015	N/A
12	3	"Stink Walks the Walk"	May 19, 2015	N/A
13	4	"Homecoming"	May 26, 2015	N/A
14	5	"Birthday Ballers"	June 2, 2015	N/A
15	6	"Arrested Development"	June 30, 2015	N/A
16	7	"Nelly Nose Best"	July 7, 2015	N/A
17	8	"Rock Star"	July 14, 2015	N/A
18	9	"Rehearsal Tour-Ture"	July 21, 2015	N/A
19	10	"Showtime"	July 28, 2015	N/A
20	11	"California Dreaming"	August 4, 2015	N/A
21	12	"The Graduate"	August 11, 2015	N/A
