= Apple Bottoms =

Fashion brand for women

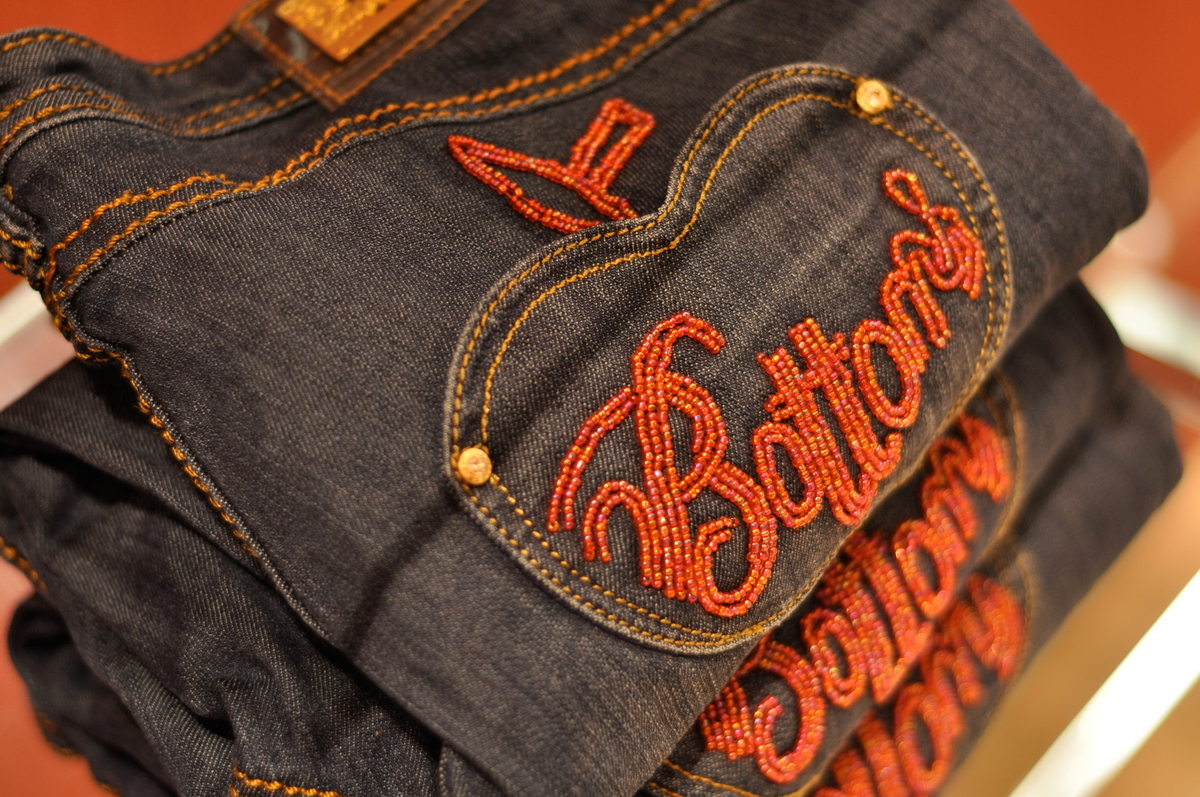
AppleBottom jeans

AppleBottoms is a fashion brand for women launched in 2003 by rap artist Nelly, Yomi Martin, Nick Loftis, and Ian Kelly. The brand was initially a denim label, but has since expanded to include other women's and girl's clothing, perfume and accessories.

The brand was launched with a model search televised on VH1. It quickly became popular in the hip hop community, and is referenced in various rap songs, including Twista's "Overnight Celebrity", MC Jin's "36-24-36", DaCav5's "Tetris", Flo Rida's "Low", and Eminem's "Shake That". In 2006, it was the sixth most searched for denim brand on Google.

The brand's last ad campaign was in 2010, and featured Nelly. On March 7, 2020, Nelly hinted at a comeback by the brand via Instagram. The relaunch was set for November 2024.
