= Get Like Me (Nelly song) =

Single by Nelly featuring Nicki Minaj and Pharrell

from the album M.O.
- Released: July 2, 2013
- Recorded: 2012–13
- Genre: Hip-hop
- Length: 3:52
- Label: Republic
- Songwriters: Cornell Haynes, Jr.; Onika Maraj; Pharrell Williams
- Producer: Pharrell Williams

Nelly singles chronology
"Cruise (Remix)" (2013)	"Get Like Me" (2013)	"The Fix" (2015)

Nicki Minaj singles chronology
"#Twerkit" (2013)	"Get Like Me" (2013)	"Love More" (2013)

Pharrell singles chronology
"Feds Watching" (2013)	"Get Like Me" (2013)	"Lose Yourself to Dance" (2013)

"Get Like Me" is a song written and performed by American rapper Nelly featuring Nicki Minaj and Pharrell Williams. Produced by the latter, the song was released by Republic Records as the second single from the former's seventh studio album M.O. on July 2, 2013.

Upon release, "Get Like Me" was positively received by music critics, who praised the trio's chemistry. The song only entered Billboard's Bubbling Under Hot 100 and Hot R&B/Hip-Hop Songs charts, signifying commercial failure compared to Nelly's previous works.

== Background ==
"Get Like Me" was written by Nelly, Nicki Minaj and Pharrell Williams while the production was handled by Williams. In June, 2013, Nelly made the announcement on Twitter, writing "New NELLY FT @NICKIMINAJ ‘GET LIKE ME’ produce by @Pharrell dropping the 18th". The song was recorded in 2012 originally as a collaboration between Nelly and Williams. Speaking of "Get Like Me", Nelly stated, "Actually, me and Pharrell did the record maybe about a year ago and we were coming back to the records that we did, closing out the album and putting everything together and I was just like, 'Yo I think Nicki might be dope on this'... we made it happen and I was right. She [Nicki] killed it!". Williams commented, “When we get together, we like to do a song that evokes as much energy as possible.”

== Composition ==
"Get Like Me" is a drum-driven song with sparse and percussive beat. Lyrically, it is a self-pride song, further described as "an ode to Nelly's dope-ness". Nelly sings about how everyone tries to steal his shine, "See the whole rap game/ They sounding like me". Minaj echoes his sentiments singing: "Get their own speakers and some pros like me/ When I'm at the game, all the pros like me." Minaj sings the lines "You should follow my example, bitch I.E./ 'Cause I'm front row Isaac Miz-ra-hi," putting "extra emphasis" on her words, by breaking down her rhymes into simple syllables. She also sings about the things she has accomplished throughout her career mentioning her Beats By Dr. Dre endorsement deal. Rob Markman from MTV News noted that the song initially was similar to Nelly and Pharrell's collaborations on "Hot in Herre" (2002) "Flap Your Wings" (2005) and further compared it with songs produced by The Neptunes. Jenna Hally Rubenstein of the same publication noted that it sounds very similar to other songs produced by Williams.

== Critical reception ==
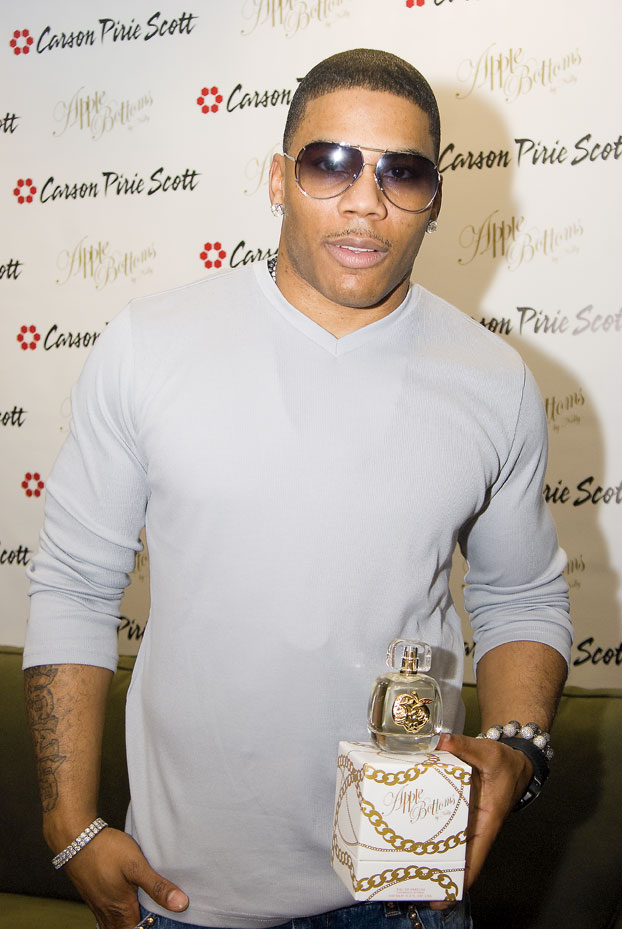
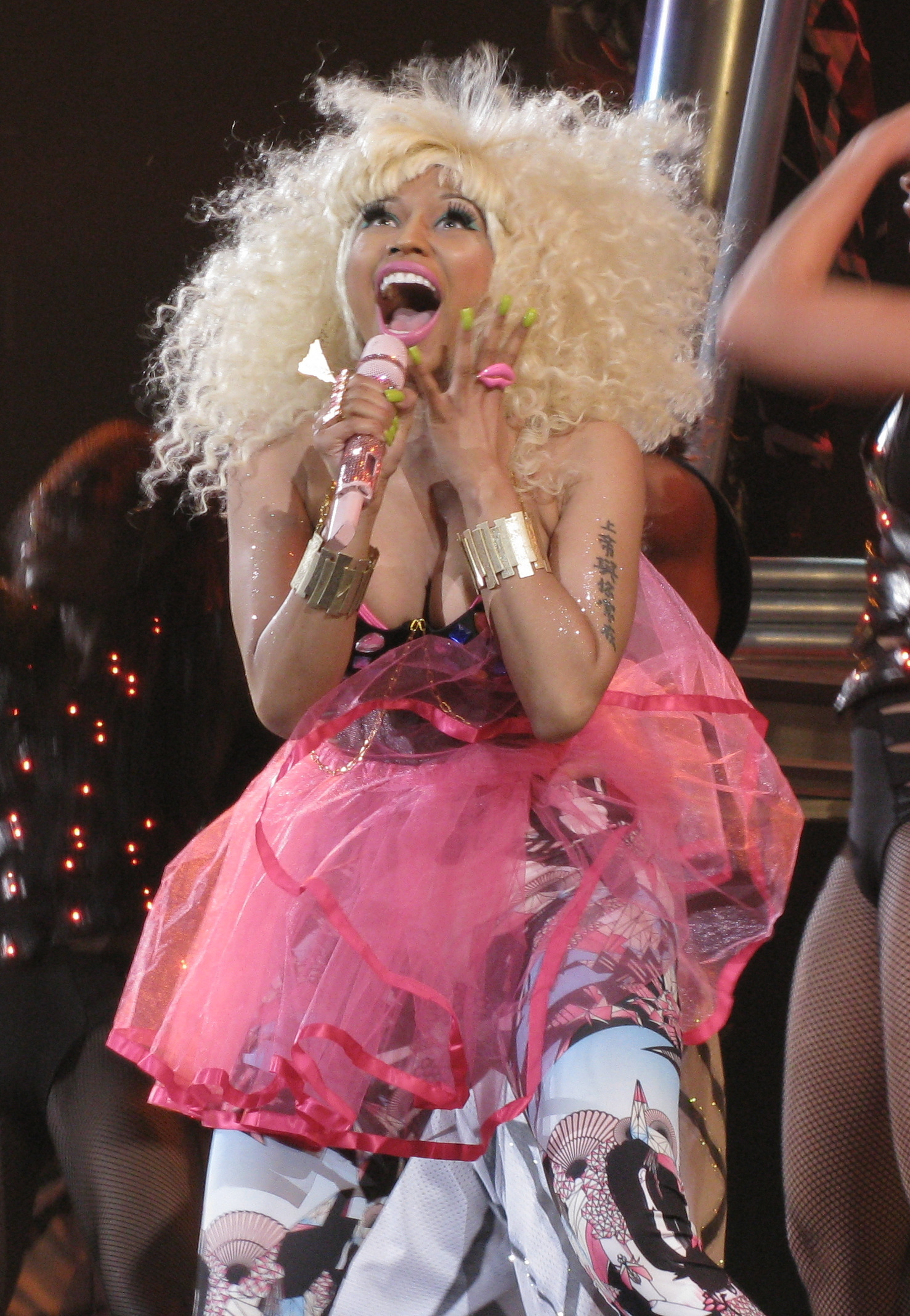
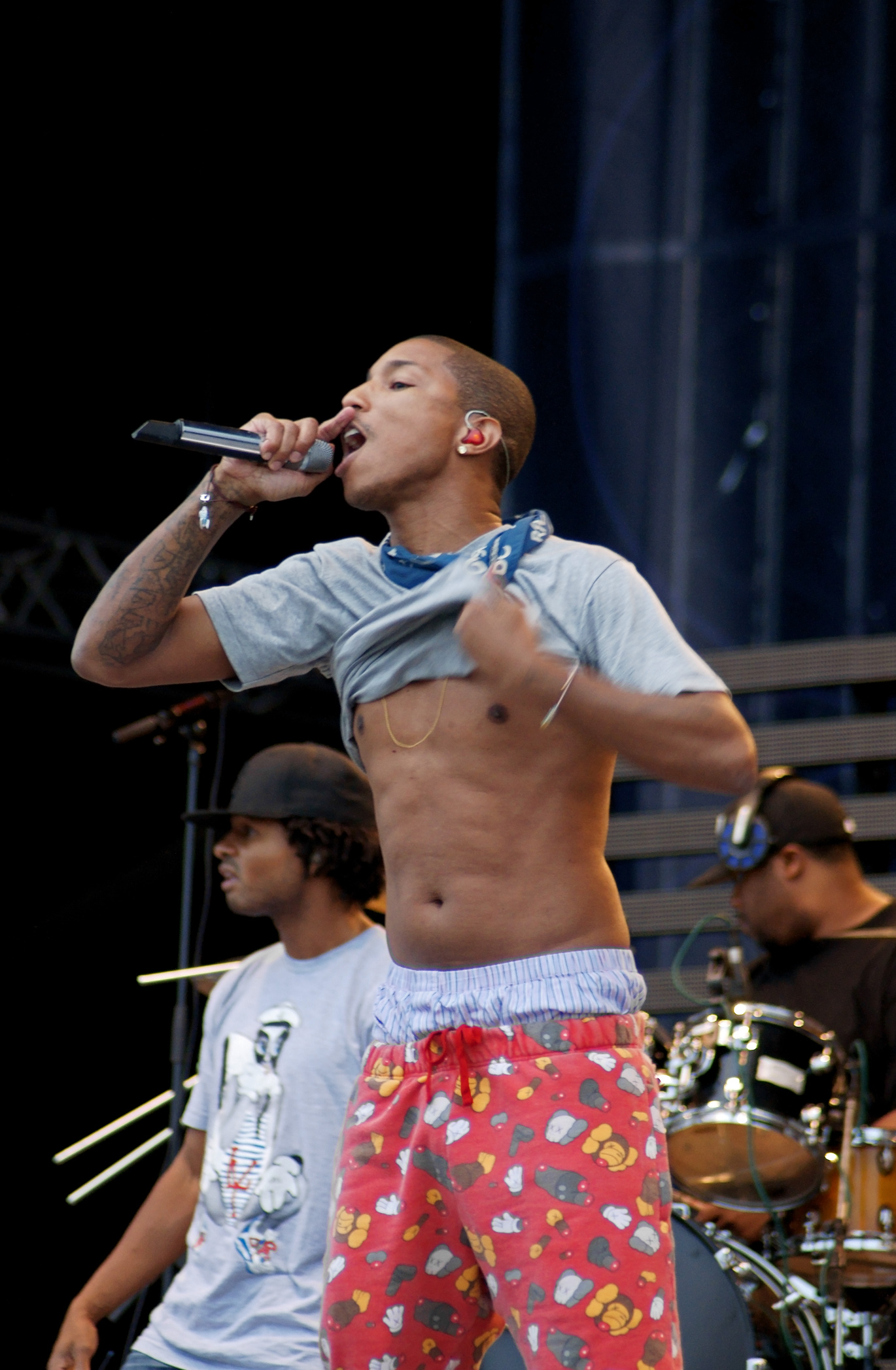
Nelly (left) and Pharrell Williams (center) recorded the song as a duet in 2012. However, during the final sessions of the recording for the album M.O., Nelly invited Nicki Minaj (right) to be featured on the track.

Rob Markman from MTV News praised the chemistry between Nelly and Pharrell Williams and added that Minaj's addition to the song "perfected the recipe". In another review, he noted that "Get Like Me" was another notable performance for Minaj's "star-studded" discography adding that it enhanced the "chemistry and excitement" in the song. He further praised Nelly's singing adding that the song was a proof that he "hasn't lost his jones for hip-hop". Mike Powell of the magazine Rolling Stone graded "Get Like Me" with three stars out of five writing in his review, "Despite the billing on the marquee, the fizzy, minimal second single from Nelly... belongs to Nicki and Pharrell. You'd think a rapper known for her overheated quirk would flame out next to someone as systematically cooled-out as Pharrell, but she rises to the occasion – ironically, by sitting down and leaning back."

== Music video ==
A music video was shot in Los Angeles, on June 26, 2013, directed by Colin Tilley. A behind-the-scenes video was released on July 11, 2013. After several teasers, the music video premiered on 106 & Park on July 31, 2013, and peaked at number 1 on August 26, 2013. Nelly described the video as "equally energetic" with the song. He further said "[Nicki] brings energy, charisma, and her star power, and I think that’s what the video is about. It’s just about that star power and energy and the hypeness of the joint."

The video is shot in black and white and includes various scenes with video dancers as well as the three artists rapping in minimalist rooms with huge white screens behind them. One scene features a drum beat played on a woman's bare behind. It also features Minaj twerking on a throne.

Eric Diep of XXL magazine wrote that the three artists "turn the heat up" further praising Minaj for showing her "voluptuous curves". A writer of The Huffington Post described the video as "sexy" with "gratuitous footage of beautiful women dancing". A writer of Rap-Up described the video as "slick and sexy".

== Track listing ==
- Digital download
1. "Get Like Me" (featuring Nicki Minaj and Pharrell) – 3:52

== Chart performance ==
=== Weekly ===
Chart (2013–14)	Peak position
Australian ARIA Urban Singles	34
Belgium (Ultratip Bubbling Under Flanders)	27
Belgium (Ultratop Flanders Urban)	18
Canada (Hot Canadian Digital Songs)	74
Ireland (IRMA)	96
Scottish Singles Sales (Official Charts)	26
UK Singles (Official Charts)	19
UK Hip Hop/R&B (Official Charts)	4
US Bubbling Under Hot 100 (Billboard)	8
US Hot R&B/Hip-Hop Songs (Billboard)	36
US Rhythmic Airplay (Billboard)	27

=== Year-end ===
Chart (2013)	Position
Belgium (Ultratop Flanders Urban)	100

== Radio and release history ==
Country	Date	Format	Label
United States	July 2, 2013	Digital download	Republic Records
United States	July 16, 2013	Rhythmic contemporary radio	Republic Records
