= M.O. (album) =

Studio album by Nelly
- Released: September 30, 2013
- Genres: Hip-hop; R&B
- Length: 46:50
- Label: Republic
- Producers: Detail; DJ Frank E; J.U.S.T.I.C.E. League; K-Mack; John "$K" McGee; Planet VI; Sag Live; Rico Love; Soul Unique; Pharrell Williams

Nelly chronology
5.0 (2010)	M.O. (2013)	Heartland (2021)

Singles from M.O.
- 1. "Hey Porsche" Released: February 19, 2013; 2. "Get Like Me" Released: July 2, 2013; 3. "Heaven" Released: September 2, 2013; 4. "All Around the World" Released: November 21, 2013; 5. "Rick James" Released: December 2013

M.O. is the seventh studio album by American rapper Nelly. It was released through Republic Records on September 30, 2013. A follow-up to his sixth album, 5.0 (2010), the album features guest appearances from Nicki Minaj, Pharrell Williams, Future, T.I., Daley, 2 Chainz, Trey Songz, Fabolous, Wiz Khalifa, Florida Georgia Line, Nelly Furtado and Yo Gotti. The title reflects both Nelly's Midwest roots and his personal nickname, which he found was symbolizing his identity and longevity in hip-hop.

The album received mixed reviews, with critics noting its polished but backward-looking sound that failed to innovate or recapture Nelly's former impact, despite a few strong collaborations. M.O. moderately entered the US Billboard 200, debuting and peaking at number 14. Its lead single, "Hey Porsche", was released on February 19, 2013, and peaked at number 42 on the US Billboard Hot 100. "Get Like Me", featuring Nicki Minaj and Pharrell Williams, premiered online on June 18, 2013, and was released on July 2, 2013 as the album's second single.

== Background and recording ==
On July 3, 2011, Nelly made a public announcement on Today that he was recording a new album. On January 10, 2012, it was announced that Nelly would be working with producer Dr. Dre on new music, presumably for his seventh studio album. On January 15, 2012, Nelly announced via Twitter that he was working with singers Chris Brown, Trey Songz and producer Noel "Detail" Fisher on his new album. On July 3, 2012, he announced that the album would be titled M.O.. In August 2012, in an interview with ThisIs50.com, Nelly confirmed that Akon and the St. Lunatics will appear on the album.

On August 10, 2012, Nelly posted a photo on Instagram of himself and producer Mike Will Made It in a recording studio working on new material for the album. On July 7, 2013, it was announced that the album would be released on September 30, 2013. On September 4, 2013, the album cover was released. On September 10, 2013, the final track listing was released revealing guest appearances on the album from Nicki Minaj, Pharrell, Future, T.I., Daley, 2 Chainz, Trey Songz, Fabolous, Wiz Khalifa, Florida Georgia Line, Nelly Furtado and Yo Gotti.

In September 2013, during an interview with Complex Nelly spoke about why he titled the album M.O., saying: "First of all, I’m excited that I get a chance to do a seventh album. [Laughs.] Also, being 14 years later [since Country Grammar was released], being able to do a lot of great things in 14 years and represent somewhere that a lot of people don’t get to represent, especially in the music business and definitely in the hip-hop game. I stand for the Midwest. That’s why the album’s titled M.O., ‘cause I’m still holding it down like that. My friends and family all call me Mo, so it’s kind of like really representing where I’m from and me at the same time."

== Singles ==
On July 3, 2012, Nelly announced via Twitter that the title of the album's first promotional single would be "Marry Go Round". The Da Internz-produced track features Chris Brown and premiered in full online on July 4, 2012. On February 19, 2013, the album's first single "Hey Porsche" was released. On March 1, 2013, the music video was released for "Hey Porsche". On July 2, 2013, the album's second single "Get Like Me" featuring Pharrell and Nicki Minaj was released. On July 31, 2013, the music video was released for "Get Like Me" featuring Pharrell and Nicki Minaj. On September 2, 2013, the album's third single "Heaven" featuring Daley was released. On October 3, 2013, with the album in stores, Nelly appeared on Good Morning America to perform the Pharrell-produced song, "Rick James" alongside T.I. In December 2013, "Rick James" will be sent to urban contemporary radio in the United States as the album's fifth single.

== Critical reception ==
Professional ratings
Review scores
Source	Rating
AllMusic	3/5 stars
Artistdirect	5/5 stars
Rolling Stone	2/5 stars
Tom Hull – on the Web	B
XXL	2/5 stars

M.O. was met with generally mixed reviews from music critics. David Jeffries of AllMusic gave the album three out of five stars, saying "Even if Nelly had his most successful single in years with 2010's "Just a Dream," his defining numbers go back over a decade before this 2013 release, with "Country Grammar" landing in 2000 and the massive "Hot in Herre" dropping in 2002. The serene and smooth "Just a Dream" was also an odd duck for the party-time rapper as he always seemed more comfortable popping bottles and dropping drawers, so the semi-sweet M.O. splits the difference, dropping "Just a Dream" sequels like the uplifting "Heaven" with Daley, and the less-successful "Headphones" with Nelly Furtado, a rap-by-numbers "we need something that sounds like B.o.B's 'Airplanes'" track."

Chris Mench of XXL gave the album an M, saying "In the end, M.O. simply fails to excite or innovate. It’s a serviceable enough album, one that may have been good if it had been released in 2004. However, not only does it not break new ground, but it has a pervasive sense of playing catch-up. It’s as if Nelly knows he’s lost the public’s ear and is trying desperately to get it back. Unfortunately for him the album fails to do so, and M.O. remains a disappointment for a rapper who was once among the most recognizable entities in hip-hop." Caryn Ganz of Rolling Stone gave the album two out of five stars, saying "Nelly's seventh album opens strong with a brilliantly chill Nicki Minaj cameo on a gloriously narcotic Pharrell track ("Get Like Me") and a characteristically romantic turn from Future ("Give U Dat"), but wraps weakly with a jangly jam featuring country duo Florida Georgia Line and a cheesy ballad with Nelly Furtado." Rick Florino of Artistdirect gave the album five out of five stars, saying "M.O. ebbs and flows with dynamics rarely seen in hip-hop. That's what makes it such a well-rounded listen overall. Ultimately, it's a milestone for Nelly, and that's saying a lot. He's not stopping anytime soon either."

== Commercial performance ==
The album debuted at number 14 on the Billboard 200 chart, with first-week sales of 15,000 copies in the United States. In its second week, M.O. sold 5,000 more copies. In its third week, the album sold 3,000 more copies bringing its total album sales to 23,000.

== Track listing ==
M.O. – Standard version
No.	Title	Writer(s)	Producer(s)	Length
1.	"Get Like Me" (featuring Nicki Minaj and Pharrell Williams)	Cornell Haynes, Jr.; Williams; Chad Hugo; Onika Miraj	Williams	3:51
2.	"Give U Dat" (featuring Future)	Haynes; Noel Fisher; Nayvadius Willburn; Andre Proctor	Detail	4:12
3.	"Rick James" (featuring T.I.)	Haynes; Clifford Harris, Jr.; Williams	Williams	3:46
4.	"Heaven" (featuring Daley)	Haynes; Fisher; Evan Taubenfeld; Sidney Swift; Alex Goodwin	Detail	3:23
5.	"Maryland, Massachusetts"	Haynes; Williams	Williams	3:48
6.	"100K" (featuring 2 Chainz)	Haynes; Fisher; Tauheed Epps; Abraham Mosses; Rasool Diaz	Detail	3:49
7.	"All Around the World" (featuring Trey Songz)	Haynes; Erik Ortiz; Kevin Crowe; Kenneth Bartolomei; Lewis Hughes; Nicholas Audino; Tremaine Neverson; Brandon Green	J.U.S.T.I.C.E. League	4:07
8.	"IDGAF" (featuring Pharrell Williams and T.I.)	Haynes; Williams; Mike Posner; Harris, Jr.	Williams	3:10
9.	"U Know U Want To"	Haynes; Theron Thomas; Timothy Thomas; Theodore Thomas; Jevon Hill	Planet VI	3:50
10.	"My Chick Better" (featuring Fabolous and Wiz Khalifa)	Haynes; John McGee; Bertell Young; John Jackson; Cameron Thomaz	John "$K" McGee	4:18
11.	"Walk Away" (featuring Florida Georgia Line)	Haynes; Richard Butler, Jr.; Pierre Medor; Diego Ave	Rico Love	4:18
12.	"Headphones" (featuring Nelly Furtado)	Haynes; Starley Hope; Martin Evans; John Goodier; Andrew Roettger; Allen Ritter; Green	Soul Unique; Ritter^{[a]}	4:18
Total length:				46:50

M.O. – Deluxe version (bonus tracks)
No.	Title	Writer(s)	Producer(s)	Length
13.	"Ciroc & Simply Lemonade" (featuring Yo Gotti)	Haynes; Steven A. Goodson; Mario Mims	Nelly; Sag Live	3:28
14.	"Hey Porsche"	Haynes; Justin Franks; David Glass; Breyan Isaac; Harrison Kipner	DJ Frank E; Kipner^{[a]}	3:29
15.	"Shake Whatever"	Haynes; Williams	Williams	3:10
16.	"Mo's Focused"	Haynes; Jared "Face 49" Johnson; Arnaldo Gordon; Karriem Mack; Keith Lamar Conover	K-Mack; Johnson; Conover^{[a]}	2:57
Total length:				59:54

Notes

- ^{^[a]} denotes co-producer(s)
- The track order is sequenced differently on physical and digital releases.

== Charts ==
Chart performance for M.O.
Chart (2013)	Peak position
Australian Albums (ARIA)	81
Japanese Albums (Oricon)	34
UK Albums (Official Charts)	89
UK R&B Albums (Official Charts)	10
US Billboard 200	14
US Top R&B/Hip-Hop Albums (Billboard)	4

== Release history ==
M.O. release history
Region	Date	Format	Label	Ref.
United Kingdom	September 30, 2013	CD; digital download	Universal Island	
United States	September 30, 2013	CD; digital download	Derrty Ent.; Republic	
Italy	October 2, 2013	CD; digital download	Universal Music	
Germany	October 4, 2013	CD; digital download	Universal Music	
