= Multiman =

Danish-American record producer and songwriter

Kim Elsberg Moeller, better known as Multiman, is a Danish-American record producer and songwriter.

He has worked with or produced and remixed for names like J. Lewis featuring Flo Rida, Backstreet Boys, Randy Crawford and Ruff Endz. In addition, he wrote the most played pop single in 2003 in Denmark, Every little part of me, for Danish idol Julie, which went x 4 platinum and stayed number 1 on the charts for more than 14 weeks in a row. Was the exclusive producer and writer in a 2-year collaboration (2006–2007) with Texas native R&B singer Brandon Beal on his album Comfortable released in 2008

== Discography ==
| Year | Single | Album | Artist | Contribution by MultiMan | Notes | Official Catalog Number | Country Of Origin |
|---|---|---|---|---|---|---|---|
| 2010 | Go | (Single) | Nelly featuring Talib Kweli & Ali | Writer/Producer | | UPC: 602527535425 | United States |
| 2010 | I Fall in Love | (Single) | Brandon Beal | Writer/Producer | | UPC: 859704683282 | United States |
| 2010 | Dancing for Me | (Single) | J. Lewis Featuring Flo Rida | Writer/Producer | | Interscope | United States |
| 2009 | Unlove You | (Single) | Brandon Beal | Writer/Producer | | USTC90990209 | United States |
| 2008 | (Album) | Comfortable | Brandon Beal | Writer/Producer | | MMG 859700749036 | United States |
| 2008 | Country Love | (Single) | Brandon Beal | Writer/Producer | | USTC40824011 | United States |
| 2007 | I Don't Wanna See You Again | (Single) | Brandon Beal | Writer/Producer | | USTC10726781 | United States |
| 2006 | Grown | (Single) | Brandon Beal | Writer/Producer | | USTC10671714 | United States |
| 2003 | Every Little Part of Me | Home | Julie | Writer | 6 weeks @ number 1 on the official Danish Airplay Charts, 4 x Platinum, 18 weeks on charts | #EMI 551796 | Denmark |
| 2001 | Invitation | One Love | Blue | Writer | Number 1 album on UK Charts | # CDSN11.07243 5 43943 2 4 | United Kingdom |
| 2001 | Here on Earth | Supersonic | Shola Ama | Writer/Producer | - | # | United Kingdom |
| 1999 | Merry Go Round | Play Mode | Randy Crawford | Writer | - | # WEA 8573 85125-2 | United States |
| 2001 | Untouchables | Toya | Toya | Writer/Producer | 400.000 singles and albums sold in the US | # Arista 07822-14697-2 | United States |
| 2002 | Bigger | Someone to Love You | Ruff Endz | Writer/Guitarist | - | # Epic 85691 | United States |
| 2001 | Moving On | All sides | LMNT | Writer/Producer | - | # Atlantic 83541 | United States |
| 1998 | Everybody MultiMan Remix | Everybody (Backstreet's Back) | Backstreet Boys | Remixer/remix producer | - | # Jive 0516762 | United States |
| 2000 | Told You | Told You | Latin.Com | Writer | Top 10 single Spain | # Polydor 0601215801729 | Spain |
| 2000 | Call 4 Me | K-otic | K-Otic with singer Sita | Writer | Platinum & gold | # Zomba 9241182 | Netherlands |
| 1998 | Misconception | Christina | Christina | Writer/Producer | Gold selling album Denmark | # UMD 85080 | Denmark |
| 1998 | Love Takes Two | Christina | Christina | Writer/Producer | Gold selling album Denmark | # UMD 85080 | Denmark |
| 1998 | Did You Reach for Me | Christina | Christina | Writer/Producer | Gold selling album Denmark | # UMD 85080 | Denmark |
| 1997 | Love Takes Two | Love takes two - remix | You Know Who | Writer/Producer | Platinum selling album | # UMD 85029 | Denmark |
| 1997 | Love Takes Two | You Know Who | You Know Who | Writer/Producer | Platinum selling album | # UMD 85025 | Denmark |
| 2000 | Reach 4 Me | Reach 4 Me | Johnny Logan | Writer | Platinum selling album | # Epic 502022 2 | Denmark |
| 2000 | I Wanna Go Back | Miracle | S.O.A.P. | Writer | Gold selling album | # Sony Music 498334 2 | Denmark |
| 2000 | Give It All U Got | Miracle | S.O.A.P. | Writer | Gold selling album | # Sony Music 498334 2 | Denmark |
| 1997 | Don’t Look Back | Don't Look Back | Bikini | Writer/Producer | - | # ERE 012837-2/0128372 | Denmark |
| 1997 | You Are Everything | Everything Is You | Charlene Smith | Writer | - | # Indochina 058 | United Kingdom |
| 2000 | Sometimes | Mukupas Law | Miss Mukupa | Writer/Producer | Danish Female Rapper | # Sony Music 497426 2 | Denmark |
| 2000 | Bitch 4 real | Mukupas Law | Miss Mukupa | Writer/Producer | Danish Female Rapper | # Sony Music 497426 2 | Denmark |
| 2000 | Mukupas Law | Mukupas Law | Miss Mukupa | Writer/Producer | Danish Female Rapper | # Sony Music 497426 2 | Denmark |
| 1999 | Remember Me | Stick Around | Ann Louise | Writer | - | # MRCD 3410 | Denmark |
| 1999 | I Care 4 U | Stick Around | Ann Louise | Writer | - | # MRCD 3410 | Denmark |
| 1999 | Venus | Camilot | Camilot | Producer | - | # Universal 542 137 -2 | Denmark |
| 1999 | Black Is Black | Camilot | Camilot | Producer | - | # Universal 542 137 -2 | Denmark |
| 1997 | You’re the Hero of My Heart | Fairy Tales | Tiggy | Writer/Producer | Gold selling album | # EMI 8564722 | Denmark |
| 1998 | Into My World | Sko | Søren Sko | Writer | - | # Polydor 557 706 2 | Denmark |
| 1998 | I Ain’t Got No problems | I Ain’t Got No Problems (single) | Søren Sko | Remixer | Remix by MultiMan & CMN & Tue Roh | # EMI 8682042 | Denmark |
| 1997 | Blue Marlin | Alone in the Desert | Little Jam | Writer/Producer | - | # EMI 8568812 | Denmark |
