= Vokal (fashion brand) =

Hip hop fashion brand

- Type: Private
- Industry: Fashion
- Founded: St. Louis, Missouri, U.S. (1997)
- Founder: Cornell "Nelly" Haynes Jr, Yomi Martin and Nick Loftis
- Products: Apparel and accessories
- Website: vokal.com

Vokal was a hip hop fashion brand launched in 1997 by Abayomi Jamil “Yomi” Martin, rapper Cornell "Nelly" Haynes Jr, and Nick Loftis. Vokal's team began selling T-shirts, jerseys, and custom clothing from their homes and car trunks. Nelly and his rap crew St. Lunatics started performing in the area of St. Louis and with Nelly's first solo album release both became known nationwide. The brand essentially grew right along with the career of Nelly and the St. Lunatics and became known worldwide.

== History ==
Vokal was launched in 1997 as a Hip Hop Fashion brand by Yomi Martin, his cousin Cornell “Nelly” Haynes, and Nick Loftis. They wanted to launch a new brand that was not driven by big marketing budgets and that did not have standard logos and designs. Yomi and Nelly were looking for a new innovative brand with daring and unique designs where the clothes speak for themselves.

For their first production, they each paid $100 to have 30 T-shirts made featuring the St. Lunatics. The St. Lunatics are a rap crew from St. Louis, Missouri formed by rapper Nelly and his hometown friends. Yomi Martin sold the shirts for $20 each at a concert of the St. Lunatics. With these sales of these shirts and jerseys at concerts and out of car trunks Vokal began selling successfully within the county limits of St. Louis.

While Yomi Martin was focusing on the Clothing line, Nelly focused on his musical career and that of his group St. Lunatics. Over time, Vokal was officially creating custom jerseys for superstar and co-founder Cornell "Nelly" Haynes Jr, as well as his cousin's Hip Hop group, the St. Lunatics. With the group's name growing in popularity, Vokal even began touring with the St. Lunatics, representing Vokal and selling clothing after the St. Lunatic's events. Many people wanted to buy what the then-independent artists were wearing. Not only consumers started wearing Vokal but also other independent artists and athletes.

When Nelly's debut album, Country Grammar, spent 7 weeks on top of the U.S. Album Charts and went 9 times platinum, fuelled by the enormous success of the title track. With this debut Vokal was instantly known in the entire United States, Vokal essentially grew right along with the career of Nelly and the St. Lunatics.

The first official collection was launched in 2001 and while Nelly was extremely busy he still had a great influence on the collection for Vokal. This paid off right away because the sales immediately skyrocketed. Not only consumers but also other independent artists and athletes, started wearing Vokal but also other independent artists and athletes.

In June 2004, Vokal shut down production of their clothing following a copyright dispute with their licensee, ALM International Corporation. The company resumed production and went on to produce clothes for three years until 2007 when it seemingly ceased all production for the final time. The shutdown of Vokal has not been addressed since then.

== Brand name ==
The clothing label, titled Vokal, stands for "Very Organized Kids Always Learning". The slogan is 'Vokal, the clothing speaks for itself'.

== Vokal gear ==
At the time, Vokal's team of Yomi and Nelly were creating pieces that were mainly inspired by the home metro, St. Louis, Missouri. They were looking for a new innovative brand that would stand out for its daring and unique designs.

Vokal thrived to have a universal appeal by developing products that could relate to the masses. It started by selling shirts and hats in nightclubs, at events, and literally out of the trunk of a car. This old fashion-selling channel created a buzz and a Vokal explosion in St. Louis. Just three years after the company was established, Vokal had sold more than 50,000 shirts and was well on its way.

"Like Nelly and the music he makes, the designs of Vokal are edgy, unique, and daring with much attention paid to detail," Yomi Martin said. Innovative denim wear and trendy T-shirts are just some of the items in the broad array of fashions in the Vokal line. Vokal wants to set the hottest trends for young menswear. The men's line takes a creative and different approach to casual urban clothing.

"Keep an eye on what I'm wearing," says Nelly. "I'll always be dressed in Vokal."

== Distribution ==
Vokal was sold in select stores in America and Europe.
