= Errtime =

Single by Nelly featuring Jung Tru and King Jacob

from the album The Longest Yard: The Soundtrack
- Released: March 15, 2005
- Recorded: 2005
- Genre: Hip hop
- Length: 4:09
- Label: Universal Records
- Songwriters: Nelly; Jung Tru; King Jacob
- Producer: Jazze Pha

Nelly singles chronology
"N Dey Say" (2005)	"Errtime" (2005)	"Fly Away" (2005)

"Errtime" (stands for Everytime) is a single by the rapper Nelly released in March 2005, from the soundtrack to the 2005 film, The Longest Yard (which featured Nelly alongside Chris Rock and Adam Sandler). The song managed strong digital download and close to no airplay, balancing out to its Billboard peak of #24. The official video for the song features cameo appearance by Snoop Dogg, and the actor Adam Sandler at the end of the video. Also the video features a few scenes from the movie, including the scene with D12.

== Track listing ==
1. Errtime (Clean) - 4:10
2. Errtime (Album) - 4:10
3. Errtime (Instrumental) - 4:08

== Charts ==
Chart	Peak position
Australia (ARIA)	15
Australian Urban (ARIA)	8
Germany (GfK)	54
New Zealand (Recorded Music NZ)	21
US Billboard Hot 100	24
US Hot R&B/Hip-Hop Songs (Billboard)	59
US Pop 100 (Billboard)	27

== Certifications ==
Region	Certification	Certified units/sales
United States (RIAA)	Gold	500,000^{^}
^{^} Shipments figures based on certification alone.
