= The Longest Yard (2005 film) =

2005 film by Peter Segal

- Theatrical release poster
- Directed by: Peter Segal
- Screenplay by: Sheldon Turner
- Based on: The Longest Yard; 1974 film by Tracy Keenan Wynn; Albert S. Ruddy
- Produced by: Jack Giarraputo
- Starring: Adam Sandler; Chris Rock; James Cromwell; Nelly; William Fichtner; Burt Reynolds
- Cinematography: Dean Semler
- Edited by: Jeff Gourson
- Music by: Teddy Castellucci
- Production companies: Columbia Pictures; MTV Films; Happy Madison Productions; Callahan Filmworks
- Distributed by: Paramount Pictures (United States and Canada); Sony Pictures Releasing International (International)
- Release date: May 27, 2005
- Running time: 113 minutes
- Country: United States
- Language: English
- Budget: $82 million
- Box office: $191.5 million

The Longest Yard is a 2005 American sports comedy film directed by Peter Segal and written by Sheldon Turner. An updated remake of the 1974 film, it stars Adam Sandler as a washed-up former professional football quarterback who goes to prison and is forced to assemble a team to play against the guards. The film co-stars Chris Rock, James Cromwell, the rapper-musician Nelly, William Fichtner, David Patrick Kelly, Tracy Morgan, and Cloris Leachman, as well as Burt Reynolds (who played Sandler's role in the original).

The Longest Yard was released by Paramount Pictures in the United States and Canada, and Sony Pictures Releasing (under the Columbia Pictures label) elsewhere on May 27, 2005. The film received mixed reviews from critics and moviegoers, but was a box office success, grossing $191.2 million on an $82 million budget.

== Plot ==
Paul Crewe is a former National Football League (NFL) quarterback who was accused of shaving points. Though he was never convicted, he was placed on federal probation for five years. One night, dissatisfied with his life, he gets drunk during a party and goes joyriding through San Diego in his girlfriend Lena's Bentley, causing a high-speed police chase and car crash. His probation is revoked and he is sentenced to three years in prison.

Instead of being imprisoned in California, he gets transferred to Texas, thanks to the influence and contacts of Warden Rudolph Hazen, an avid football fan. Wishing to boost his prison's reputation for a potential future election as State Governor, he uses threats and confinement in a hot box to coerce Crewe into helping the prison guards' football team, led by the sadistic Captain Knauer. Crewe informs Hazen that what Hazen's team needs is a tune-up game to boost the guards' confidence, and is therefore coerced to form an inmate team to play against the guards. He does so with the help of a newfound friend, Caretaker. They start off with a poorly organized team, before being noticed by another prisoner, former college football star and Heisman winner Nate Scarborough, who decides to help coach the team by gathering several high profile inmates as a boost to the team's strength. The team still lacks speed and coordination, particularly because the athletic black inmates led by Deacon Moss refuse to play over Crewe's past. Crewe challenges Deacon to a basketball game but loses, however his resilience impresses inmate Earl Megget, who joins the team. Later, after witnessing Megget be the target of racial insults by the guards, Deacon and his gang join the team, thus improving the team's overall quality.

Hazen and the guards hinder Crewe's team in several ways, such as flooding the field, but they overcome the obstacles and attempt to sabotage the guards, including replacing Engelhardt's steroids with estrogen. Meanwhile, inmate Unger spies on the activities of the inmates and after being pressured by the guards, rigs Crewe's radio with an explosive. Caretaker unknowingly enters the cell to give a photo gift to Crewe but is killed when he tries to turn the dial on the radio.

On game day, the inmates are revitalized in the wake of Caretaker's murder when they find he used his connections to his cousin at Reebok to supply the inmates with quality uniforms and gear with the team name "Mean Machine". Crewe deals with some difficulty getting the inmates to focus on winning the game rather than assaulting the guards during opening play, stating that a loss to them would be a far bigger mark of shame to the guards than any physical brutality they could inflict. Though the guards take an early lead, even having the referee call bogus penalties (which Crewe resolves by throwing the ball twice into the referees' genitals), by the end of the first half, the Mean Machines tie the game.

During halftime, Hazen threatens to implicate Crewe in Caretaker's murder and extend his prison sentence to 25 to life unless Crewe purposely throws the game. During the opening of the second half, Crewe deliberately throws the game and abandons his teammates despite their efforts to catch up in scoring. After earning a three-touchdown lead on the Mean Machines, the Guards brutally injure the inmates, spurring Crewe to re-enter the field. The inmates initially refuse to help him, allowing him to be sacked twice, but on fourth and long, Crewe completes a first down on his own. During the time out Crewe confesses to the point shaving that got him cut from the NFL, explaining he owed bad debts to "worse people". Informing the team of Hazen's threats, he declares that he would stay with the inmates rather than make the same mistake twice in one life and betray Caretaker's memory. The Mean Machines rally behind Crewe and with a decisive two-point conversion, they win the game by a one-point margin.

Knauer congratulates Crewe for his victory and promises he'll ensure Crewe isn't charged for Caretaker's murder. He's subsequently admonished by Hazen for losing a fixed game and notices that Crewe is heading towards the exit. Eagerly implying Crewe is trying to escape, Hazen orders that Crewe be shot. Knauer hesitates and at the last moment realizes that Crewe is only collecting the game football. Crewe returns it to Hazen, telling him to "stick it in [his] trophy case". Deacon and Battle then dump Gatorade on Hazen, while Crewe and Scarbrough go to get information on where Unger is so that inmate Switowski can deal with him.

== Cast ==
=== Cons ===
- Adam Sandler as Paul Crewe, QB - a disgraced NFL QB who wound up in a Texas State Prison
- Burt Reynolds as Nate Scarborough, TB - an older inmate who was a Heisman winner
- Chris Rock as James Farrell - an inmate who befriends Crewe and helps with recruiting the team
- Cornell Haynes Jr as Earl Megget, RB/KR - an inmate known for his speed
- David Patrick Kelly as Unger - an inmate who works as a CI for the guards
- Tracy Morgan as Miss Tucker - a transgender inmate who leads the Mean Machine's cheerleading squad
- Michael Irvin as Deacon Moss, WR - leader of the Black Crew who joins the Mean Machine
- Terry Crews as "Cheeseburger" Eddy, TE - an inmate known for smuggling in McDonalds food
- Nicholas Turturro as Brucie, WR/QB/K - a psychotic inmate who lacks coordination in football
- Bill Goldberg as Joey Battaglio, LB - a muscular inmate with a beef against Knauer
- Bob Sapp as Switowski, DE - a childlike inmate with brute strength but a good heart
- Steve Reevis as Billy Rainwater - a Native American inmate who also appeared as a guest sportscaster for the big game
- Lobo Sebastian as Torres, DB - a violent inmate with an obsession for Joy Behar.
- Dalip Singh as Turley, FB - a violent inmate locked in the high security part of prison
- Joey Diaz as Anthony Cobianco, DT - an overweight player who lacks in endurance
- Eddie Bunker as "Skitchy" Rivers - an elderly convict serving life in prison after punching a guard that soon became the warden
- Stink Fisher as Cafeteria Prisoner, OL
- Deshaun Holton, Rufus Johnson, Denaun Porter, Kuniva and Swift of D12 as basketball convicts

=== Guards ===
- William Fichtner as Captain Brian Knauer, QB
- Brian Bosworth as Guard Garner, LB/TE
- Bill Romanowski as Guard Lambert, LB
- Kevin Nash as Sergeant Engelhardt, DL
- Steve Austin as Guard Dunham, FB
- Michael Papajohn as Guard Papajohn, KR/DB
- Conrad Goode as Guard Webster
- Brandon Molale as Guard Malloy, DL
- Todd Holland as Guard Holland
- John Hockridge as Guard Hock

=== Other ===
- James Cromwell as Rudolph Hazen
- Cloris Leachman as Lynette Grey
- Allen Covert as Walter
- Rob Schneider as Punky
- Chris Berman as himself
- Jim Rome as himself
- Patrick Bristow as Patrick
- Lauren Sanchez as herself
- Dan Patrick as Jack Pugh
- Christopher Neiman as Big Ear Cop
- Ed Lauter as Duane
- Sean Salisbury as Vic
- Rob Moore as Gavin
- Kurt Alexander as Jesse
- Marc S. Ganis as Lorenzo
- Shane Ralston as Bradlee
- Walter Williamson as Errol Dandridge
- Courteney Cox as Lena (uncredited)

== Production ==
The movie was filmed primarily at the New Mexico State Penitentiary on Route 14, Santa Fe, New Mexico. The football game at the end of the movie was filmed at Murdock Stadium at the El Camino College in Torrance, California. The car chase scene was filmed in Long Beach, California. Other parts of the movie were filmed in Los Angeles and New Mexico. The golf course scene was filmed at Lost Canyons Golf Club in Simi Valley, California.

== Music ==
The Longest Yard: The Soundtrack

Soundtrack album by various artists
- Released: May 24, 2005
- Recorded: 2004–2005
- Genre: Hip hop
- Length: 53:01
- Labels: Derrty Ent.; Universal
- Producers: David Banner; Eminem; Emperor Searcy; Erick Sermon; Fala Beats; Furious; Hardley Davidson; Jazze Pha; Luis Resto; Nick "Fury" Loftin; Rashad Hill; Trife; Yonny

Singles from The Longest Yard: The Soundtrack
- 1. "Errtime" Released: March 15, 2005; 2. "Fly Away" Released: May 24, 2005

Professional ratings
Review scores
Source	Rating
Allmusic	3/5 stars

The Longest Yard: The Soundtrack is the original soundtrack to The Longest Yard. It was released on May 24, 2005, through Derrty Ent. Records and Universal Records and consisted entirely of hip hop music. The soundtrack was a success, peaking at No. 11 on the Billboard 200, #10 on the Top R&B/Hip-Hop Albums and #1 on the Top Soundtracks. The film itself contains a mixture of hip-hop and rock music, featuring music by Creedence Clearwater Revival, Norman Greenbaum, Red Hot Chili Peppers, and AC/DC, among others. Two singles also made it to the Billboard charts, "Errtime" and "Fly Away", both performed by Nelly, who also plays Earl Megget in the film.

=== Track listing ===
No.	Title	Producer(s)	Length
1.	"Errtime" (performed by Nelly, Jung Tru & King Jacob)	Jazze Pha	4:09
2.	"Shorty Bounce" (performed by Lil' Wayne)	Furious	4:06
3.	"Bounce Like This" (performed by T.I.)	Nick "Fury" Loftin	4:48
4.	"Let 'Em Fight" (performed by Ali & Gipp)	Trife	3:35
5.	"Stomp" (performed by Murphy Lee, King Jacob & Prentice Church)	Fala Beats	4:25
6.	"So Fly" (performed by Akon & Blewz)	Erick Sermon	3:44
7.	"U Should Know" (performed by 216)	Yonny	4:10
8.	"Whip Yo Ass" (performed by WC & Nelly)	Hardley Davidson	3:14
9.	"Talking That Talk" (performed by Chamillionaire & David Banner)	David Banner	3:56
10.	"Datz on My Mama" (performed by Taylor Made & Nelly)	Hardley Davidson	4:52
11.	"Infultrate" (performed by Trillville)	Emperor Searcy	3:28
12.	"My Ballz" (performed by D12)	Eminem; Luis Resto^{[a]}	4:26
13.	"Fly Away" (performed by Nelly)	Rashad Hill	4:14
Total length:			53:01

Notes

- ^{^[a]} signifies an additional producer.

== Release ==
The Longest Yard was released on May 27, 2005, in the United States and September 9, 2005, in the United Kingdom. It was also released on the same day as DreamWorks Animation's family-friendly film, Madagascar, which also stars Chris Rock.

== Reception ==
=== Box office ===
The Longest Yard did well at the box office. Its $47.6 million opening weekend was the largest of Sandler's career and only second to The Day After Tomorrow as the largest opening by a movie that was not No. 1. The film would go on to gross $158.1 million in the United States and Canada and $190 million worldwide. It was the highest-grossing film produced by MTV Films until it was surpassed by Hansel & Gretel: Witch Hunters.

=== Critical response ===
The Longest Yard has received mostly mixed reviews. On Rotten Tomatoes, the film has an approval rating of 31% based on 167 reviews, with an average rating of 4.8/10. The website's critical consensus reads, "This Yard has some laughs but missing from this remake is the edginess of the original." On Metacritic, the film has a weighted average score of 48 out of 100, based on 35 critics, indicating "mixed or average reviews". Audiences polled by CinemaScore, gave the film a grade of "A−" on an A+ to F scale.

Roger Ebert, in the critical minority with this title, gave it a "Thumbs Up", defending it later in his Chicago Sun-Times review as a film that "...more or less achieves what most of the people attending it will expect." In the print review, Ebert beseeches his readers to "...seek out a movie you could have an interesting conversation about", citing films not in wide release such as Dominion: Prequel to the Exorcist and Kontroll, until finally encouraging his readers to "drop any thought of seeing anything else instead" if they can see Crash.

=== Accolades ===
The film earned Chris Rock a BET Comedy Award for Outstanding Supporting Actor in a Theatrical Film.

Burt Reynolds earned a nomination at the 26th Golden Raspberry Awards for Worst Supporting Actor for his performance in both this film and The Dukes of Hazzard.

== See also ==
- List of American football films
