= Just a Dream (Nelly song) =

2010 single by Nelly

Single by Nelly

from the album 5.0
- Released: August 16, 2010
- Recorded: 2010
- Studio: The Hit Factory; Playland Playhouse (Miami, Florida)
- Genre: Pop rap; R&B
- Length: 3:57
- Label: Derrty; Universal Motown
- Songwriters: Cornell Haynes Jr.; James Scheffer; Richard Butler Jr.; Frank Romano
- Producers: Jim Jonsin; Rico Love

Nelly singles chronology
| "Stepped on My J'z" (2008) | "Just a Dream" (2010) | "Move That Body" (2010) |

Music video
- "Just a Dream" on YouTube

"Just a Dream" is a song by American rapper Nelly, released as the lead single from his sixth album 5.0 in 2010. The song was written by Mitch J, Nelly, Rico Love, Jim Jonsin and Frank Romano with Jonsin and Love producing the song. The song was released on August 16, 2010, to iTunes Stores around the world for digital download. It was released alongside the promotional single, "Tippin' In da Club". On October 6, 2010, the song was certified triple platinum by the RIAA.

== Composition ==
"Just a Dream"
A sample of "Just a Dream", a pop rap and R&B song, featuring the end of a verse and the chorus, which Nelly sings.

Nelly said, "I think that the way the whole song plays out, with the beat and the lyrics, I think it comes together in the sense of it's almost a timeless song."

Many have speculated "Just a Dream" is actually about Nelly's relationship with Ashanti. He responds in an interview for "That Grape Juice", "No it's not about Ashanti. It's just a song that I and my man [Rico] came up with. It's a song that just relatable on all levels – rich, poor, black, white, child, adult – whatever level it is. If [thinking it’s about Ashanti] is what helps people to go out and support it then so be it (giggles)."

The music is a sample of the track "Variations sur Marilou" by the French singer Serge Gainsbourg (1976).

== Chart performance ==
"Just a Dream" made its first chart appearance, debuting on the US Billboard Hot 100 at number twelve and peaking at number three in its eighth week. The song also debuted at number 38 on Billboard's Mainstream Top 40 chart, and debuted at number eight on the Billboard Digital Songs chart, selling 135,000 downloads in its first week. "Just a Dream" is Nelly's highest-charting song since his 2005 single "Grillz". and debuted at number 22 on the Billboard Rap Songs chart. As of November 2013, the song has sold over 4 million copies in the United States.

The song entered the Canadian Hot 100 in August 2010, at number 32. It debuted in Australia (ARIA Charts) at number 24; on the New Zealand Singles Chart at number 29; Switzerland (Media Control AG) at number 52; and the UK Singles Chart at number 8.

== Live performances ==
Nelly performed "Just a Dream" during a free concert to help promote St. Louis' bid for the 2012 Democratic National Convention at Kiener Plaza on July 29, 2010. He also performed the song during the 2010 MOBO Awards in Liverpool, United Kingdom on October 20, 2010. Nelly performed live for the November 13 Margarito/Pacquiao bout at Cowboys Stadium, Arlington, Texas. He also performed on Coke Studio on April 25, 2013, with Egyptian singer Sherine.

== Accolades ==
Nelly won "Top Streaming Song" for "Just a Dream" at the 2011 Billboard Music Awards. At the 2011 MuchMusic Video Awards, Nelly was Nominated for "MuchMusic.com Most Watched Video" for "Just a Dream" but lost to Taio Cruz's "Dynamite". The song is also covered in the 2012 musical comedy Pitch Perfect by Anna Kendrick.

== Music video ==
Nelly shot the music video to "Just a Dream" on August 26, 2010, at Playa del Rey, Los Angeles. The director of the video is Sanji. Nelly goes sky high in a dramatic black-and-white video, sitting in his car while floating high above the ocean. Nelly looks down on his girl—Kat Graham—as she runs along the shore. Later, he comes down to the ground to take a trip to the club. While searching for his love, he mistakes a girl walking on the street—actress Bianca Siavoshy—for his girlfriend. His dream home, a wedding ring, and his car, items that had been floating above the beach, burst into flames, their ashes falling to the shore below. There are several shots of one of Nelly's eyes shattering as if made of glass.

The car in the video is a custom-made Ford Mustang GT.

The house in the video is a dollhouse called The Emerson House, made by toymaker Brinca Dada.

It premiered on September 21, 2010. Shannon Brown of the Los Angeles Lakers makes a cameo appearance.

== Track listing ==
Digital download

1. "Just a Dream" – 3:57

== Credits and personnel ==
The credits for "Just a Dream" are adapted from 5.0 album liner notes.

Recording information

- Recorded in Florida at The Hit Factory Studios and Playland Playhouse, Miami.

Personnel

- Nelly – vocals, songwriter
- James Scheffer (Jim Jonsin) – producer, songwriter, keyboards
- Richard Butler Jr. (Rico Love) – producer, songwriter
- Frank Romano – guitar, songwriter
- Robert Marks – recording engineer, audio mixer
- Ryan Evans – recording engineer
- Jason Wilkie – recording assistant, mixing assistant
- Matt Huber – recording assistant, mixing assistant
- Thurston McCrea – recording assistant, additional engineering
- Chad Jolley – mixing assistant
- Brandon Jones – additional engineering

== Charts and certifications ==
=== Weekly charts ===
| Chart (2010–2011) | Peak position |
|---|---|
| Australia (ARIA) | 3 |
| Austria (Ö3 Austria Top 40) | 8 |
| Belgium (Ultratop 50 Wallonia) | 45 |
| Belgium (Ultratop 50 Flanders) | 35 |
| Canada Hot 100 (Billboard) | 5 |
| Canada AC (Billboard) | 34 |
| Canada CHR/Top 40 (Billboard) | 2 |
| Canada Hot AC (Billboard) | 3 |
| Czech Republic Airplay (ČNS IFPI) | 39 |
| Denmark (Tracklisten) | 39 |
| Finland (Suomen virallinen lista) | 8 |
| France (SNEP) | 56 |
| Germany (GfK) | 17 |
| Hungary (Editors' Choice Top 40) | 40 |
| Ireland (IRMA) | 8 |
| Israel International Airplay (Media Forest) | 10 |
| Mexico Ingles Airplay (Billboard) | 11 |
| Netherlands (Dutch Top 40) | 10 |
| Netherlands (Single Top 100) | 17 |
| New Zealand (Recorded Music NZ) | 5 |
| Norway (VG-lista) | 15 |
| Poland Airplay (ZPAV) | 1 |
| Poland (Polish Airplay New) | 1 |
| Slovakia Airplay (ČNS IFPI) | 6 |
| Scottish Singles Sales (Official Charts) | 8 |
| Sweden (Sverigetopplistan) | 15 |
| Switzerland (Schweizer Hitparade) | 22 |
| UK Singles (Official Charts) | 8 |
| US Billboard Hot 100 | 3 |
| US Adult Pop Airplay (Billboard) | 16 |
| US Dance Airplay (Billboard) | 11 |
| US Hot Rap Songs (Billboard) | 6 |
| US Pop Airplay (Billboard) | 1 |
| US Rhythmic Airplay (Billboard) | 1 |

=== Year-end charts ===
| Chart (2010) | Position |
|---|---|
| Australia (ARIA) | 16 |
| Canada (Canadian Hot 100) | 41 |
| Sweden (Sverigetopplistan) | 44 |
| UK Singles (Official Charts Company) | 68 |
| US Billboard Hot 100 | 35 |
| US Mainstream Top 40 (Billboard) | 32 |
| US Rhythmic (Billboard) | 33 |

| Chart (2011) | Position |
|---|---|
| Austria (Ö3 Austria Top 40) | 60 |
| Canada (Canadian Hot 100) | 49 |
| Netherlands (Dutch Top 40) | 67 |
| Russia Airplay (Tophit) | 47 |
| US Billboard Hot 100 | 52 |
| US Mainstream Top 40 (Billboard) | 34 |
| US Rhythmic (Billboard) | 44 |

== Certifications ==
| Region | Certification | Certified units/sales |
|---|---|---|
| Australia (ARIA) | 4× Platinum | 280,000^{^} |
| Brazil (Pro-Música Brasil) | Diamond | 250,000^{‡} |
| Denmark (IFPI Danmark) | Platinum | 90,000^{‡} |
| Germany (BVMI) | Gold | 150,000^{‡} |
| New Zealand (RMNZ) | 4× Platinum | 120,000^{‡} |
| Sweden (GLF) | Gold | 20,000^{‡} |
| Switzerland (IFPI Switzerland) | Gold | 15,000^{^} |
| United Kingdom (BPI) | 2× Platinum | 1,200,000^{‡} |
| United States (RIAA) | 4× Platinum | 4,000,000 |
^{^} Shipments figures based on certification alone.^{‡} Sales+streaming figures based on certification alone.

== Radio and release history ==
| Country | Date | Format |
|---|---|---|
| United States | August 10, 2010 | Mainstream; rhythmic radio |
| Japan | August 16, 2010 | Digital download |
| Switzerland | August 16, 2010 | Digital download |
| Canada | August 17, 2010 | Digital download |
| United States | August 17, 2010 | Digital download |
| Italy | August 30, 2010 | CD single |
| Brazil | September 24, 2010 | Airplay |
| United Kingdom | October 15, 2010 | Digital download |
| Germany | November 12, 2010 | CD single |
