= Nelly =

American rapper (born 1974)

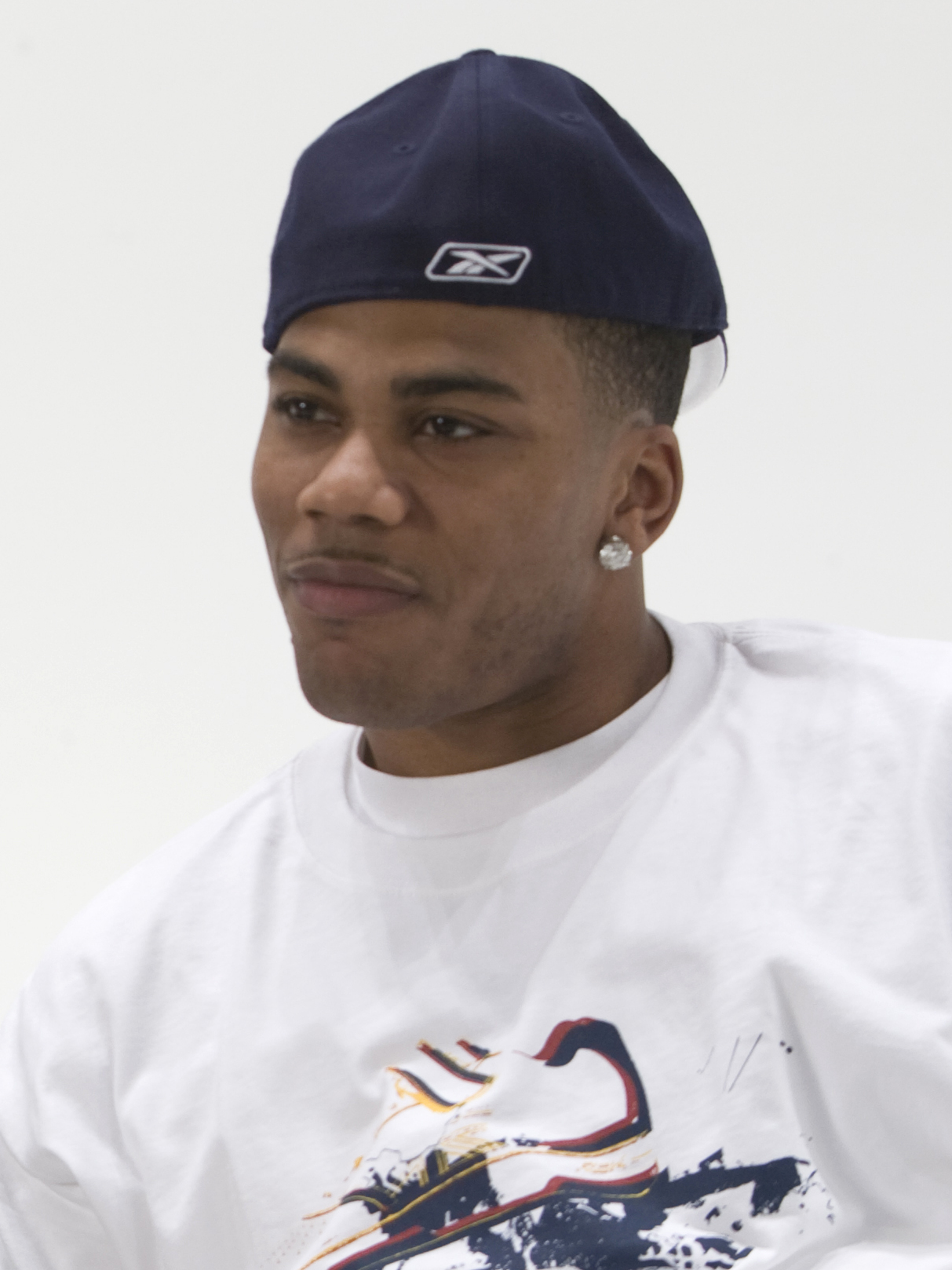
- Nelly in 2007
- Born: Cornell Iral Haynes Jr. November 2, 1974 (age 52); Austin, Texas, U.S.
- Occupations: Rapper; singer; songwriter; actor
- Years active: 1993–present
- Works: Discography; filmography
- Spouse: Ashanti (m. 2023)
- Children: 5 (Note: Three biological children and two adopted children)
- Family: City Spud (half-brother); Yomi Martin (cousin)
- Awards: Full list
- Musical career
- Origin: St. Louis, Missouri, U.S.
- Genres: Midwestern hip-hop; pop rap; R&B; pop; country rap
- Labels: RECORDS; Columbia; Derrty; Republic; Universal Motown; Universal
- Member of: Ocean's 7; St. Lunatics
- Website: realnelly.com

Cornell Iral Haynes Jr. (born November 2, 1974), better known by his stage name Nelly, is an American rapper, singer, and actor. He grew up in St. Louis, Missouri, and embarked on his musical career in 1993 as a member of the Midwestern hip-hop group St. Lunatics. He signed with Universal Records as a solo act in 1999 to release his debut studio album, Country Grammar (2000). Its two lead singles, "Country Grammar (Hot Shit)" and "Ride wit Me" (featuring City Spud), both entered the top ten of the Billboard Hot 100. The album peaked atop the Billboard 200 and received diamond certification by the Recording Industry Association of America (RIAA). His second album, Nellyville (2002), spawned two consecutive Billboard Hot 100 number-one singles: "Hot in Herre" and "Dilemma" (featuring Kelly Rowland), along with the top-five single, "Air Force Ones" (featuring Murphy Lee and St. Lunatics).

The same-day dual release of his next albums Sweat and Suit (2004)—bundled into the 2005 compilation album Sweatsuit—were met with continued success. Sweat debuted at number two while Suit debuted at number one, selling an estimated 700,000 combined units in their first week. His fifth studio album, Brass Knuckles (2008), was supported by the singles "Party People" (featuring Fergie), "Stepped on My J'z" (featuring Jermaine Dupri and Ciara), and "Body on Me" (featuring Akon and Ashanti). His sixth album, 5.0 (2010), delved further into pop. Its lead single, "Just a Dream", received triple platinum certification by the RIAA and was followed by "Move That Body", (featuring T-Pain and Akon), and "Gone", (featuring Kelly Rowland). His seventh and eighth albums, M.O. (2013) and Heartland (2021), were both met with lukewarm commercial response and mixed reviews; the latter was released by Columbia Records and marked a full departure from his previous styles in favor of country rap.

Nelly has won multiple accolades throughout his career, including three Grammy Awards and nine Billboard Music Awards. He has been referred to by Peter Shapiro as "one of the biggest stars of the new millennium". In 2014, Nelly was ranked as the fourth-best-selling hip-hop artist in American music history according to the RIAA, with 21 million albums sold in the United States. In December 2009, Billboard ranked Nelly at number three on the Top Artists of the Decade list for the 2000s. Outside of recording, he starred in the 2005 sports film The Longest Yard alongside Adam Sandler and Chris Rock. He launched the clothing line Vokal in 1997 and the line of womenswear, Apple Bottoms in 2003. His record label imprint, Derrty Entertainment, was launched in a joint venture with Motown in 2003, though it has been largely inactive.

== Life and career ==
=== 1974–2000: Early life and start of career ===
Cornell Iral Haynes Jr. was born on November 2, 1974, in Austin, Texas, the only son of Cornell Haynes Sr. and Rhonda Mack. His father served in the Air Force for much of his childhood and when he was seven, his parents divorced. As a teenager, Haynes moved with his mother from St. Louis, Missouri, to University City, a St. Louis County suburb. While in high school, Nelly formed the St. Lunatics with his friends Ali, Murphy Lee, Kyjuan, Slo Down, and his half brother City Spud. The group enjoyed moderate local popularity with their single "Gimme What Ya Got" in 1996.

Despite being popular in Missouri and the surrounding areas, the group struggled to achieve success outside of St. Louis. The rest of the group agreed to let Nelly go solo after a major record deal failed to appear. Later in 1999, Nelly was signed to Universal Music Group by A&R Kevin Law. Law told HitQuarters that Nelly was largely disliked by the label when he first signed, with the feedback he received from his colleagues on the rapper's music being "extraordinarily negative".

Nelly was unusual for being a rapper from the Midwest at a time when hip-hop was dominated by the East Coast, West Coast and the South. The label used this to their advantage by branding him as a star of the Midwest, hoping to inspire pride in the people of St Louis and the surrounding regions. Despite the negative feedback he received from the label, his debut single, "Country Grammar (Hot Shit)", was a success, peaking at number 7 on both the Billboard Hot 100 and UK singles chart. Recognizing Nelly's potential, the label began to change their mind and allowed work to begin on his debut album. The label decided to do a solo record with him first and then reunite him with the St. Lunatics the following year.

=== 2000–2003: Breakthrough with Country Grammar and Nellyville ===
The label released his debut album, Country Grammar, in 2000. The success of its title track as a single, reaching number 7 on the Hot 100 and No. 1 Hot Rap Tracks, led to the album debuting at number three in the Billboard 200 in the U.S. Other singles from the album included "E.I."; "Ride wit Me", featuring City Spud; and "Batter Up", featuring the St. Lunatics. The album was certified 9× platinum by the RIAA in April 2004. In January 2001, Nelly performed as a special guest in the Super Bowl XXXV halftime show.

In 2002, Nelly's second album, Nellyville, was released, debuting at No. 1 on Billboard's Top 200 Music Albums. Its lead single "Hot in Herre" was a number-one hit. Other singles included "Dilemma", which featured Kelly Rowland and sold over 7.6 million records worldwide, "Work It" featuring Justin Timberlake, "Air Force Ones" featuring Murphy Lee and the St. Lunatics, "Pimp Juice", and "#1". This album was highly successful and was certified 6x multi-platinum in June 2003. "Hot in Herre" won the Grammy Award for Best Male Rap Solo Performance in 2003.

In 2003, Nelly released Da Derrty Versions: The Reinvention, which featured the hit single "Iz U" from the soundtrack to Walt Disney's The Haunted Mansion. The music video of a Tip Drill Remix became a source of controversy due to perceptions of misogynistic depictions of women. The controversy forced him to cancel an appearance at a bone marrow drive at Spelman College, a historically black college in Atlanta. Similar claims of misogyny surrounded his single "Pimp Juice". RIAA has certified the album as Platinum. For the Bad Boys II soundtrack album, Nelly contributed the single "Shake Ya Tailfeather" featuring Diddy and Murphy Lee. Another number-one hit, "Shake Ya Tailfeather", won the 2004 Grammy Award for Best Rap Performance by a Duo or Group.

=== 2004–2008: Continued success; Sweat, Suit, and Brass Knuckles ===
In February 2004, Nelly performed in the Super Bowl XXXVIII halftime show, his second time performing in a Super Bowl halftime show.

On September 14, 2004, he released two albums, Sweat and Suit. Suit, an R&B-oriented album, debuted at number one on the Billboard albums chart, and Sweat, a rap-oriented album, debuted at number two. From Suit, the slow ballad "Over and Over", an unlikely duet with country music star Tim McGraw, became a crossover hit. On the 2004 NBC television concert special Tim McGraw: Here and Now, McGraw and Nelly performed the song. A feud with another St. Louis-based rapper, Chingy, emerged at the end of 2004. Tsunami Aid: A Concert for Hope, a 2004 Indian Ocean earthquake benefit concert special produced by NBC, featured Nelly. In the winter of 2005 came Sweatsuit, a compilation of tracks from Sweat and Suit with three new tracks. "Grillz", produced by Jermaine Dupri, was a number-one hit. To date both albums have sold over 5 million units in the United States.

Brass Knuckles was released on September 16, 2008, after several delays. Initial release dates for the album were October 16 and November 13. Its original lead single was "Wadsyaname", a ballad-oriented track produced by Ron "NEFF-U" Feemstar and sampling the piano riff from "All My Life" by K-Ci & JoJo. Nelly later confirmed that "Wadsyaname" was never going to be on Brass Knuckles. He recorded "Party People", featuring Fergie and produced by Polow da Don, which turned out to be his first official single off the album. "Stepped on My J'z" was the next single, produced by Jermaine Dupri; it features Dupri and Ciara. Next was "Body on Me", produced by Akon which features Akon and Ashanti. Nelly appeared on Rick Ross's third single, "Here I Am" featuring label mate Avery Storm.

=== 2009–2010: Collaborations and 5.0 ===
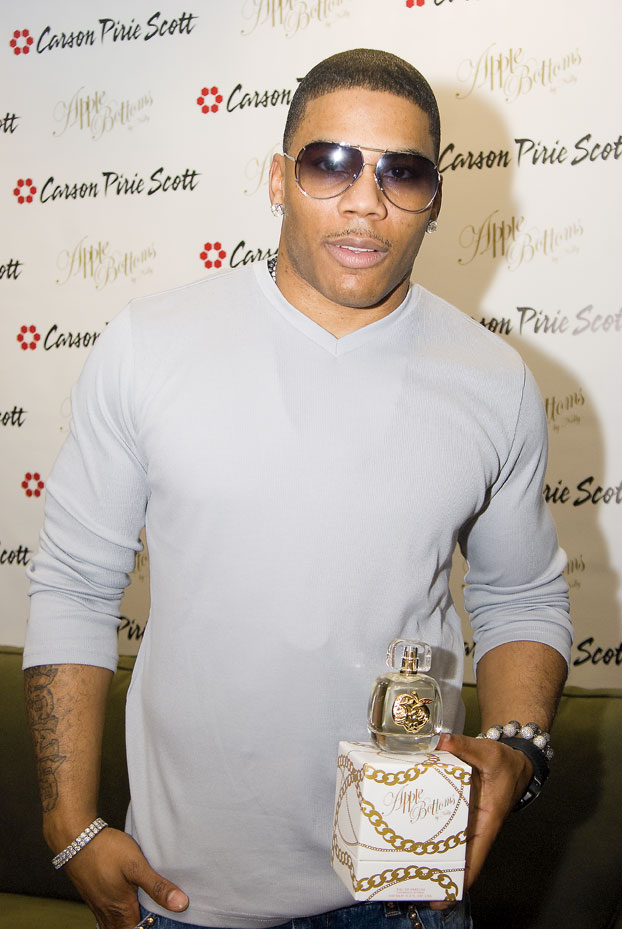
Nelly in 2010

In the summer of 2009, Nelly made a public announcement in Las Vegas about the yet-to-be-titled album. In October 2009, in an interview with SOHH.com he said that the album was going to be released sometime in 2010. In an interview with Semtex TV, he told reporters that he planned to release the album under the name Nelly. In April 2010, Nelly's cousin Michael Johnson was murdered in Missouri. Nelly said that he delayed releasing the album because of the tragedy. Guests featured on the album were T-Pain, Chris Brown, Akon, Plies, T.I., Kelly Rowland, Birdman, DJ Khaled, Avery Storm, and Diddy-Dirty Money.

In May 2010, Nelly confirmed that the title of the album was 5.0. The album was released on November 16, 2010. The album's lead single "Just a Dream" was released on August 17, 2010, through iTunes along with the promotional single "Tippin' in da Club". The two songs were released to mainstream and Rhythm/Crossover radio on August 10, 2010. "Just a Dream" made its first chart appearance debuting on the US Billboard Hot 100 at number 12 and peaking at number 3 in its fourth week. The song debuted at number 3 on the Billboard Digital Songs chart, selling 888,000 downloads in its first week.

"Just a Dream" is Nelly's highest-charting song since his 2005 single "Grillz" and debuted at number 7 on the Billboard Rap Songs. The song entered the Canadian Hot 100 in August 2010, at number 32 It debuted in Australia (ARIA Charts) on the Singles Chart at number 3, in New Zealand Singles Charts at number 29, and in Switzerland (Media Control AG) at number 52. The second single "Move That Body", which features T-Pain and Akon, was released on October 12, 2010. The song made its first chart appearance debuting on the US Billboard Hot 100 at number 54 and reached number 29 in Australia.

In October 2010, Nelly featured on the second single by singer Mohombi entitled "Miss Me", produced by RedOne. In November 2010, Nelly appeared on the Pacquiao vs. Margarito pay-per-view, at the Cowboys Stadium in Arlington, Texas. "Gone" is the sequel to his 2002 worldwide number-one single "Dilemma", also with Rowland, and is the third single from the album.

=== 2011–2014: M.O. and The Next: Fame Is at Your Doorstep ===
In June 2011, Pitbull released a song off the deluxe version of the album Planet Pit featuring Nelly titled "My Kinda Girl". In December 2011, he released his first solo mixtape, entitled O.E.MO, which stands for "On Everything MO". The mixtape features guest appearances from T.I., 2 Chainz, Bei Maejor, St. Lunatics and more.

In August 2012, Nelly became a coach on The CW's The Next: Fame Is at Your Doorstep along with Gloria Estefan, John Rich and Joe Jonas. Nelly released his second mixtape, entitled Scorpio Season, on November 2, 2012. In February 2013, he released "Hey Porsche", the lead single from his seventh studio album M.O. The song peaked at number 42 on the Billboard Hot 100 and hit the top ten in Australia, Ireland, New Zealand and the United Kingdom. In April 2013, a remix of "Cruise", the breakthrough single of country music duo Florida Georgia Line featuring Nelly, was released. In July 2013, his single "Get Like Me" featuring Nicki Minaj and Pharrell Williams was released on iTunes.

Nelly's album M.O. was released on September 30, 2013, by Republic Records.

=== 2014–present: Television series and Heartland ===
From 2014 to 2015, Nelly starred in the reality TV show Nellyville, which ran for two seasons. The BET series is about Nelly's career in music and acting. His four children are featured, two biological, the other two from his late sister. On August 6, 2015, he premiered the single "The Fix", which was released on his own label, "RECORDS". In an interview with Big Boy, Nelly said that there may or may not be a new album related to The Fix.

As of 2018, Nelly is signed to Columbia Records.

In 2020, he released the song "Lil Bit", a collaboration with Florida Georgia Line from his "country-influenced" album titled Heartland. He also joined country singers Kane Brown and Brett Kissel for remixes of their songs, "Cool Again" and "She Drives Me Crazy". In February 2024, Nelly was featured on the Jermaine Dupri single "This Lil' Game We Play", featuring Ashanti and Juicy J.

In August 2024, it was revealed that Nelly was now frequently performing at the Hollywood Casino and Hotel in Maryland Heights, Missouri. In January 2025, it was announced that Nelly would have a residency at Zouk Nightclub in Resorts World Las Vegas, with dates running through the end of August 2025. The same month, he performed at Donald Trump's Liberty Inaugural Ball to commemorate his second inauguration.

=== Film and television career ===
Nelly's film debut began in 2001 in the independent film Snipes, playing a famous rapper named Prolifik. He starred in the 2005 remake of The Longest Yard with Adam Sandler and Chris Rock. The movie's soundtrack includes his songs "Errtime" and "Fly Away". In June 2008, in an interview with Kiwibox, Nelly revealed that he is reluctant to continue his acting career, noting that he does not want to "take away from the culture of acting".

In 2008 and 2009, he appeared in episodes of the CBS crime drama CSI: NY. In 2011, he made a cameo appearance on 90210. From 2014 to 2015, he appeared in his own reality TV show, Nellyville, based on the title of his second studio album. The show ran for two seasons. From 2013 to 2016, Nelly was in the main cast of the mockumentary series Real Husbands of Hollywood.

In September 2020, Nelly was announced as one of the celebrities competing on the 29th season of Dancing with the Stars. He and his partner Daniella Karagach finished in third place.

== Artistry ==
Nelly's rapping style has been described by Peter Shapiro as using "unforgettable hooks based on schoolyard songs, double-dutch chants, and nonsense rhymes" and has a "Missouri twang". AllMusic suggests Nelly's style is based largely on where he comes from: "Nelly's locale certainly informs his rapping style, which is as much country as urban, and his dialect as well, which is as much Southern drawl as Midwestern twang".

Nelly explains his method of writing in the book How to Rap, describing how he freestyles most of the lyrics before going back over them to "make it a little tighter", he generally writes in the studio rather than at home, he normally comes up with a chorus for a song before writing the verses, and he likes to write to the music he will be rapping over. AllMusic notes his "tongue-twisting" hooks, which are often sung rather than rapped.

== Personal life ==
Nelly dated singer Ashanti from 2003 to 2013 after meeting at the 2003 Grammy Awards. The two began dating again in 2023. In December 2023, it was reported the couple were expecting their first child together and had married on the 27th. In April 2024, Ashanti confirmed her pregnancy and the couple's engagement in Essence magazine. On July 18, 2024, the couple welcomed their first child, a boy named Kareem Kenkaide Haynes.

Nelly has two children from previous relationships: a son named Cornell Haynes III (Tre) and a daughter named Chanelle (Nana). Nelly also has two adopted children from his stepsister Jaqueline Donahue, who died of leukemia on March 25, 2005. Nelly has been a longtime fan of the St. Louis Cardinals of Major League Baseball. Likewise a fan of the former St. Louis Rams during their tenure in St. Louis from 1995 to 2015, he expressed ongoing support for the team following their relocation to Los Angeles in 2016, even attending their appearance at Super Bowl LVI in 2022.

== Other ventures ==
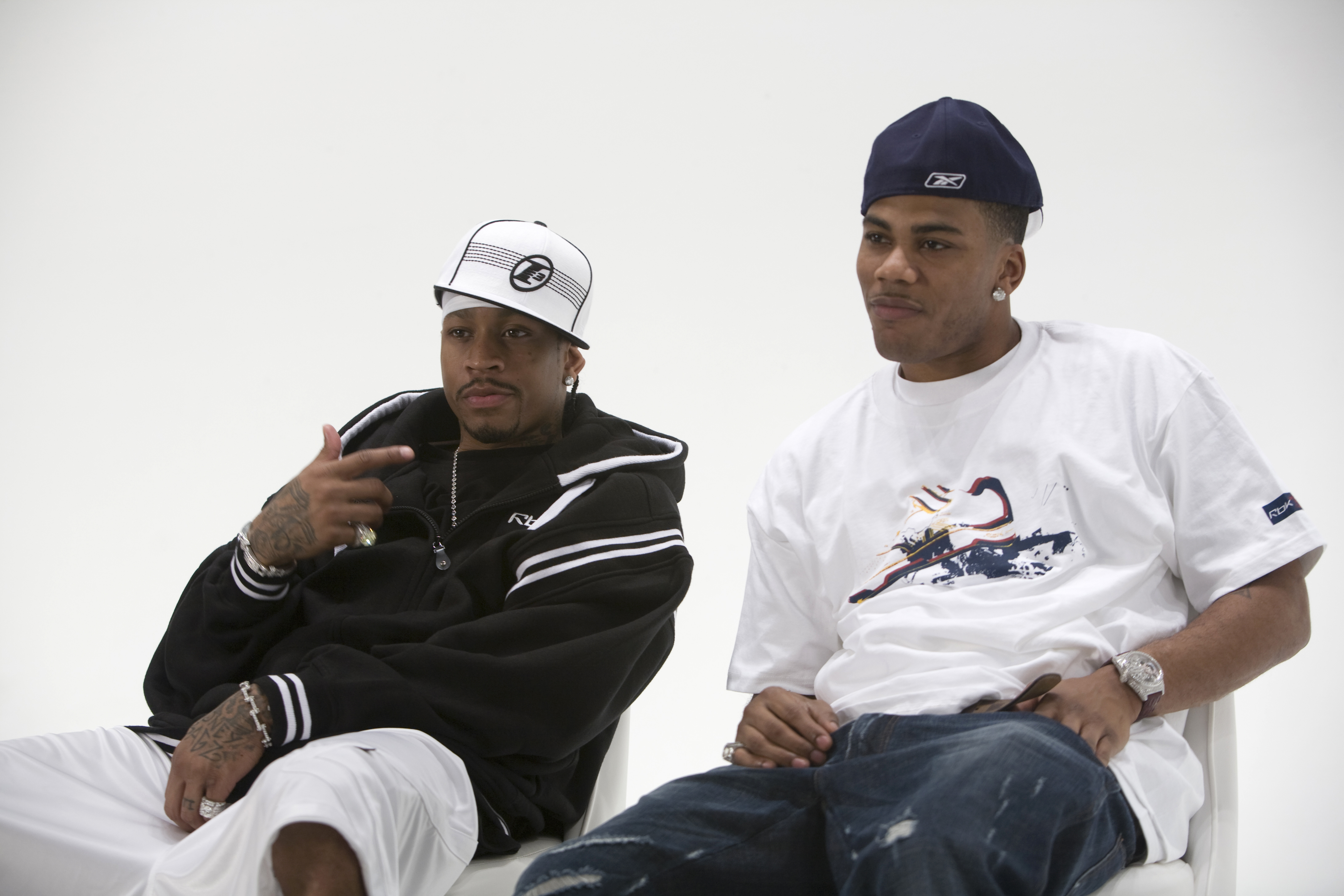
Allen Iverson and Nelly at a Reebok endorsement photo shoot in 2007

Nike and Nelly agreed on a one-year deal in 2003 to release a limited-edition sneaker called the "Air Derrty", which was a retro remake of Charles Barkley's signature sneaker. In 2005, Nelly signed a shoe deal with Reebok. He has been in ads for Got Milk? and the Ford Motor Company. His energy drink Pimp Juice sold one million cans during the first two months after its introduction in August 2003, and was criticized for its name by black consumer activists. He owns Apple Bottoms, a female clothing line, and Vokal, which caters to men. He was one of the owners of the Charlotte Bobcats, along with Robert L. Johnson and Michael Jordan, until Jordan became the majority owner in March 2010.

Nelly has played the Main Event at the 2007 World Series of Poker. He has played The PokerStars European Poker Tour and PokerStars Caribbean Adventure. In August 2010, he began a stint as the afternoon host on WHHL HOT 104.1 in St. Louis. He was taking the place of regular PM drive personality, Stacy Static, who left on pregnancy leave.

In September 2010, Nelly released a fitness DVD entitled Celebrity Sweat, walking viewers through various exercises and weight training techniques. In 2011, he and Vatterott College worked together to found the Ex'treme Institute By Nelly, which is a music production school in the heart of St. Louis.

In 2015, Nelly teamed up with Mike and Ike candy after a halt in collaborating a year earlier. He and the owners of Mike and Ike released a movie trailer the same day titled "The Return of Mike and Ike" describing the split and reunion. In 2021, he collaborated with Burger King on the "Cornell Haynes, Jr. Meal", part of a line of celebrity-themed meals that the establishment created to promote its "Keep It Real Meals", in recognition of their removal of 120 artificial ingredients from its menu items. The meal consisted of a Whopper, small fries, and a small Sprite.

In April 2023, Nelly launched a moonshine brand called "MoShine".

=== Feud with Chingy ===
Fellow St. Louis rapper Chingy was hired as an opening act, while touring in support of Nellyville in 2002. Chingy had initially expressed discontent with the lack of promotion on the tour. Meanwhile, reports persisted that Nelly was increasingly irritated with Chingy's growth in fame, particularly when he signed with Ludacris' DTP label shortly following the tour. Nelly claimed he felt disrespected by Chingy's actions, claiming in a 2005 interview; "For him to say that 'Nelly and all them didn't take no part in him getting a deal', is like saying 'RUN DMC and them didn't take any part on me getting a deal', everybody that comes out tries to help the next motherfucker".

Nelly dropped a verse on the song 'Anotha one' on his 2004 album Sweat with a line in the song saying, 'I like it how you do it right thurr [there]/You just to remember why you do that right thurr, I made it tight to be country/ They thought country was bummy/ Till country start making money' which was perceived by Chingy as a diss track. In an interview with Nelly in December 2004, he stated that he believed the lyrics were taken out of context, later claiming: "I wasn't going at him. If you listen to the song, it says, 'I like the way you do that right thurr.' I could have said, 'Fuck the way you do that right thurr!' It ain't even like that".

Angered by the song, Chingy leaked a song in response taking aim at Nelly entitled 'We Got' on January 7, 2005. In December 2005 at the Radio Music Awards in Las Vegas, Chingy alleges he approached Nelly to end the feud, but claims he refused to discuss in private but was ignored repeatedly.

Months later, Chingy approached Nelly's cousin, who allowed both rappers to put an end to the feud in 2006. During an interview in November 2022, Chingy alleged Nelly's sister Jackie had also approached him at an airport, diligent for both to resolve the feud prior to her death due to cancer complications in March 2005, claiming "At that point, she said she had a wish, and that wish was for me and him to come together... When I heard that, I had to end this; for her. This can't go on. She had a wish for this to happen, she really wanted me and her brother to be cool."

== Philanthropy ==
Nelly runs the non-profit organization 4Sho4Kids Foundation. In March 2003, he and Jackie Donahue, his sister, began the Jes Us 4 Jackie campaign, after Donahue was diagnosed with leukemia. The campaign attempts to educate African Americans and other minorities about the need for bone marrow transplants. It also tries to register more donors. Donahue died of leukemia on March 24, 2005, almost two years after the campaign began.

In 2006, Nelly started hosting a "White and Black Ball" in his hometown of St. Louis as a fundraiser to collect funds for scholarships. He has sent two students to college every year for over a decade, and set up a scholarship fund named after Michael Brown was shot and killed.

In 2010, Nelly endorsed Do Something's Tackle Hunger campaign. In a public service announcement he filmed for the cause, he challenged teens to fight hunger by collecting one million pounds of food for the holiday season.

== Legal issues ==
=== Misdemeanor drug-offense conviction (2015) ===
In April 2015, the Tennessee Highway Patrol conducted a traffic stop of Nelly's Prevost tour bus, because of non-conforming U.S. Department of Transportation and International Fuel Tax Association stickers. He, a bus driver, and four other people were on board. After a state trooper said that he smelled marijuana, the troopers searched the bus and said that they found drug paraphernalia and marijuana, as well as a substance that they initially believed to be methamphetamine and several handguns. He was initially booked into the Putnam County Jail and was released on bail.

Nelly was initially charged with felony drug possession, simple possession of marijuana and possession of drug paraphernalia. After further testing proved that the seized substance was not methamphetamine, the felony charge was dropped. In December 2015, the case was resolved when he pleaded guilty to misdemeanor possession of marijuana and misdemeanor possession of drug paraphernalia, and was sentenced to one year probation. Nelly entered a diversion program, in which the misdemeanor convictions were cleared from his record after 11 months.

=== Tax lien (2016) ===
In 2016, it was reported that there was a $2.4 million tax lien against Nelly due to unpaid taxes owed to the IRS.

=== Rape arrest (2017) ===
On October 7, 2017, Nelly was arrested in Auburn, Washington, a southern Seattle suburb, on suspicion of second-degree rape after a woman alleged that he invited her onto his tour bus earlier that morning and raped her. Nelly was booked into a Des Moines, Washington, jail and released from custody without charge. He denied wrongdoing; his attorney said that the accusation was "clearly false". On December 14, it was revealed Nelly would not be charged in the case because the alleged victim declined to cooperate. He also filed a countersuit claiming defamation. Both lawsuits were dropped after the parties reached a settlement in 2018.

At the end of January 2018, Nelly was again accused of sexual assault after a gig at the Cliffs Pavilion in Westcliff-on-Sea, England, at the end of 2017. There was an additional allegation of assault reported at the time. In 2019, it was reported that he had reached a settlement with the woman who was at Cliffs Pavilion.

=== Drug and insurance arrest (2024) ===
On August 7, 2024, Nelly was arrested in St. Louis, Missouri on a failure-to-appear warrant. The warrant stemmed from an earlier traffic charge in Maryland Heights, Missouri. He was charged with possessing four Ecstasy pills and lacking insurance. He was held and then released. His attorney said that Nelly was "targeted by an overzealous, out of line officer", and that his legal representation would ask for an inquiry into the arresting officer's conduct. It was acknowledged that this arrest was originally tied to an arrest warrant, which had been issued by a judge in December 2023 for a no proof of insurance charge.

The arrest was made after the December 2023 arrest warrant was discovered, following a required background check which occurred after Nelly scored jackpot wins at the Hollywood Casino and Hotel in Maryland Heights. After Nelly was pulled over and handcuffed, for the no proof of insurance charge, his car was searched, and the four ecstasy pills were discovered in his possession. According to a statement released by the Missouri State Highway Patrol, the initial patrol contact with Nelly occurred during an "identification verification in accordance with the Missouri Gaming Commission regulations." The arrest warrant had been issued based on a June 2018 infraction, which involved Nelly operating a vehicle without proof of insurance.

On November 12, 2024, Chris King, a spokesperson for the St. Louis County Prosecuting Attorney's Office, stated that Nelly would not face charges. King claimed that "We don't believe the facts in this case warrant the issuing of charges."

== Discography ==
Studio albums

- Country Grammar (2000)
- Nellyville (2002)
- Sweat (2004)
- Suit (2004)
- Brass Knuckles (2008)
- 5.0 (2010)
- M.O. (2013)
- Heartland (2021)

== Filmography ==
=== Film ===
Year	Film	Role	Notes
2001	Snipes	Prolifik	
2005	The Longest Yard	Earl Megget	
2014	Reach Me	E-Ruption	

=== Television ===
Year	Film	Role	Notes
2000–02	It's Showtime at the Apollo	Himself	Guest Cast: Season 14 & 16
2001	MTV Cribs	Himself	Episode: "January 16, 2001"
2001	Wild On!	Himself	Episode: "Wild on Ibiza 2001"
2001–02	Soul Train	Himself	Guest Cast: Season 30 & 32
2002	The Saturday Show	Himself	Recurring Guest: Season 1
2002–04	Saturday Night Live	Himself	Guest Cast: Season 28 & 30
2003	Cedric the Entertainer Presents	East Boogie	Episode: "Episode #1.13"
2003	The Greatest	Himself	Episode: "50 Sexiest Video Moments"
2003	Inside Out	Himself	Episode: "Nelly: The Search for Miss Applebottom"
2004	Steve Harvey's Big Time Challenge	Himself	Episode: "Episode #2.1"
2004	Making the Video	Himself	Episode: "Nelly Feat. Christina Aguilera: Tilt Ya Head Back"
2008–09	CSI: NY	Terrence Davis	Recurring Cast: Season 5, Guest: Season 6
2011	90210	Himself	Episode: "Revenge with the Nerd"
2012	The Next: Fame Is at Your Doorstep	Himself	Reality television
2013–16	Real Husbands of Hollywood	Himself	Recurring role
2014–15	Nellyville	Himself	Reality television
2017	The Platinum Life	Himself	Reality television
2020	Dancing with the Stars	Himself	Contestant
2023	Wild 'n Out	Himself	Episode: "Battle Of Sexes - Nelly/Angela Simmons/Jermaine Dupri"
2024	Magic City: An American Fantasy	Himself	Episode: "Welcome to Atlanta"
2025–	Nelly & Ashanti: We Belong Together	Himself	Main Cast

=== Video games ===
Year	Title	Role	Notes
2003	NBA Street Vol. 2	Himself	Playable character
