= DeBarge discography =

Discography of the American Music Group DeBarge

The following is the discography of American music group DeBarge.

== Albums and singles ==
=== Studio albums ===
Year	Album details	Peak chart positions						Certifications (sales threshold)
Year	Album details	US	US R&B	AUS	CAN	NZ	UK	Certifications (sales threshold)
1981	The DeBarges: Release date: April 6, 1981; Label: Gordy Records	—	58	—	—	—	—	
1982	All This Love: Release date: July 22, 1982; Label: Gordy Records	24	3	—	—	—	—	RIAA: Gold
1983	In a Special Way: Release date: September 24, 1983; Label: Gordy Records	36	4	—	—	—	—	RIAA: Gold
1985	Rhythm of the Night: Release date: March 14, 1985; Label: Gordy Records	19	3	46	19	21	94	RIAA: Gold
1987	Bad Boys: Release date: October 25, 1987; Label: Striped Horse Records	—	44	—	—	—	—	
1991	Back on Track: Release date: July 1, 1991; Label: Truth Ministries Records	—	—	—	—	—	—	
"—" denotes releases that did not chart

=== Compilation albums ===
Year	Album details
1986	Greatest Hits: Release date: October 1, 1986; Label: Gordy Records
1997	The Ultimate Collection: Release date: March 25, 1997; Label: Motown Records
2000	20th Century Masters – The Millennium Collection: The Best of DeBarge: Release date: November 21, 2000; Label: Motown Records
2008	The Definitive Collection: Release date: September 23, 2008; Label: Motown Records
2011	Time Will Reveal: The Complete Motown Albums: Release date: September 2011; Label: Motown Records, Hip-O Select

=== Singles ===
Year	Single	Peak chart positions											Certifications	Album
Year	Single	US	US R&B	US A/C	US Dance	AUS	CAN	CAN A/C	GER	NED	NZ	UK	Certifications	Album
1981	"What's Your Name"	—	—	—	—	—	—	—	—	—	—	—		The DeBarges
1982	"Stop! Don't Tease Me"	—	46	—	—	—	—	—	—	—	—	—		All This Love
1982	"I Like It"	31	2	—	—	—	—	—	—	—	—	131		All This Love
1983	"All This Love"	17	5	1	—	—	—	2	—	—	—	—		All This Love
1983	"Time Will Reveal"	18	1	12	—	—	—	—	—	—	—	155		In a Special Way
1984	"Love Me in a Special Way"	45	11	21	—	—	—	—	—	—	—	—		In a Special Way
1985	"Rhythm of the Night"	3	1	1	3	5	3	1	19	4	3	4	BPI: Silver	Rhythm of the Night
1985	"Who's Holding Donna Now"	6	2	1	—	57	9	2	—	—	44	83		Rhythm of the Night
1985	"You Wear It Well" ^{[A]}	46	7	—	1	—	—	—	—	—	—	54		Rhythm of the Night
1985	"The Heart Is Not So Smart" ^{[A]}	75	29	17	—	—	—	—	—	—	—	—		Rhythm of the Night
1987	"Dance All Night"	—	33	—	—	—	—	—	—	55	—	—		Bad Boys
1987	"I Got You Babe"	—	73	—	—	—	—	—	—	—	—	—		Bad Boys
"—" denotes releases that did not chart

- ^{A} Credited to El DeBarge with DeBarge.
