= Ultimate Collection (DeBarge album) =

The Ultimate Collection

Greatest hits album by DeBarge
- Released: May 27, 1997
- Recorded: 1982–1991
- Genre: Soul
- Label: Motown Records

DeBarge chronology
Back on Track (1991)	The Ultimate Collection (1997)	20th Century Masters Present: The Best of DeBarge (2000)

The Ultimate Collection is an album released on Motown Records by the group DeBarge. The album is the second compilation of their greatest hits and their eighth release. In addition to the group numbers, it also includes solo singles from El DeBarge and Bunny DeBarge. It also includes a track from Chico DeBarge, who was never part of the family group.

== Track listing ==
1. "Rhythm of the Night" (Dance Mix)
2. "Time Will Reveal"
3. "I Like It"
4. "You Wear It Well"
5. "Who's Holding Donna Now"
6. "Stop! Don't Tease Me"
7. "Love Me in a Special Way"
8. "A Dream"
9. "Talk to Me" (Chico DeBarge)
10. "All This Love"
11. "Love Always" (El DeBarge)
12. "Who's Johnny" (El DeBarge)
13. "The Heart Is Not So Smart" (Club Mix / Radio Edit)
14. "Save the Best for Me (Best of Your Lovin')" (Bunny DeBarge)
15. "Dance All Night" (Bunny DeBarge)
16. "Stay with Me"

• Notes

• This compilation replaces the original versions of “Rhythm of the Night” and “The Heart Is Not So Smart” with remixed editions: “Rhythm of the Night” appears as a dance mix while “The Heart Is Not So Smart” is presented in its “Club Mix / Radio Edit” version rather than the original (although, for the latter, it doesn’t specify it is a remixed version on the track listing of the CD itself).

== Alternate versions ==
In 2008, Motown re-released the album with different artwork entitled The Definitive Collection.
