= Greatest Hits (DeBarge album) =

Greatest hits album by DeBarge
- Released: October 1, 1986
- Recorded: 1981–1985
- Genre: R&B, soul, pop, funk
- Label: Gordy
- Producer: El DeBarge, Jay Graydon, Richard Perry, Giorgio Moroder

DeBarge chronology
Rhythm of the Night (1985)	Greatest Hits (1986)	Bad Boys (1987)

Greatest Hits is a compilation album released by R&B group DeBarge on Gordy Records.

The album was their first compilation of contains some of their biggest hits, including "Rhythm of the Night", "Who's Holding Donna Now", "All This Love", "Time Will Reveal", "The Heart Is Not So Smart" and "You Wear It Well".

It was rated four stars by AllMusic.

== Track listing ==
1. "Rhythm of the Night" - 3:48
2. "Who's Holding Donna Now" - 4:27
3. "You Wear It Well" - 4:45
4. "Stop! Don't Tease Me" - 6:00
5. "I Like It" - 4:20
6. "All This Love" - 5:22
7. "Time Will Reveal" - 4:11
8. "Love Me In a Special Way" - 4:13
9. "Share My World" - 5:37
10. "Single Heart" - 3:33
11. "The Heart Is Not So Smart" - 4:35
