= DeBarge family =

American family of rhythm and blues artists

DeBarge Family
- Place of origin: Detroit, Michigan, U.S.
- Members: Robert Louis DeBarge, Sr. (father; 1932–2009); Etterlene Abney (mother; 1935–2024); Etterlene "Bunny" DeBarge (b. 1955); Robert Louis "Bobby" DeBarge, Jr. (1956–1995); Thomas Keith "Tommy" DeBarge (1957–2021); William Randall "Randy" DeBarge (b. 1958); Mark "Marty" DeBarge (b. 1959); Eldra Patrick "El" DeBarge (b. 1961); James DeBarge (b. 1963); Jonathan Arthur "Chico" DeBarge (b. 1966); Carol "Peaches" DeBarge (b. 1970); Darrell "Young" DeBarge (b. 1970)

The DeBarge family is a family of rhythm and blues artists from Grand Rapids, Michigan.

In 1975, musician Bobby DeBarge left Grand Rapids to start the funk-soul band Switch, which first went by the name First Class. Eventually signing with Motown Records in 1978, the group's debut album, yielding the hit "There'll Never Be", sold over one million copies and started the DeBarge musical dynasty.

In 1979, Bunny, Marty, Randy, and El DeBarge signed with Motown as the DeBarges and released their debut album two years later, under the guidance of Bobby and Tommy who had left Switch that year to begin mentoring their siblings. James DeBarge later joined the group prior to their second album, “All This Love” A year later in 1982, the group, now known as DeBarge, found fame with the singles, "I Like It” and "All This Love”. They would go on to have several more hit singles, such as "Time Will Reveal", "Love Me in a Special Way" and "Rhythm of the Night", by the mid-1980s.

Younger brother Chico became a solo success first with his 1986 dance-pop single, "Talk to Me", followed by singles such as "Iggin' Me" and "No Guarantees". El DeBarge also found solo fame in the 1980s with singles such as "Who's Johnny" and "Love Always", and with collaborations on hits by Quincy Jones, Tone Loc, and Fourplay. Etterlene's youngest son Darrell released his first solo album in 2005.

== Members ==
Robert Louis DeBarge, Sr. (1932–2009) from Cicero, Illinois, served in the U.S. Armed Forces. Robert met Etterlene Abney (1935–2024), who was black American, in Detroit, in the early 1950s. They married in 1953, at 21 and 17 years old, respectively, settling in a predominantly Black section of Detroit, where they had ten children.

In 1972, the DeBarges moved to Grand Rapids, Michigan where Etterlene's brother, Bishop William Charles Abney, Jr., pastored Bethel Pentecostal Church. Etterlene divorced Robert in 1974 after 21 years of marriage. She later married a second time to George Rodriguez, who was Puerto Rican, leading to the erroneous rumor that the family was half-Hispanic.

Robert and Etterlene had 10 children:

- Etterlene "Bunny" DeBarge (born March 10, 1955)
- Robert Louis "Bobby" DeBarge, Jr. (March 5, 1956 – August 16, 1995)
- Thomas Keith "Tommy" DeBarge (September 6, 1957 – October 21, 2021); died of liver and kidney failure; bass guitar player and backup singer for the band Switch
- William Randall "Randy" DeBarge (born August 6, 1958)
- Mark "Marty" DeBarge (born June 19, 1959)
- Eldra Patrick "El" DeBarge (born June 4, 1961)
- James Curtis DeBarge (born August 22, 1963)
- Jonathan Arthur "Chico" DeBarge (born June 23, 1966)
- Carol "Peaches" DeBarge (born June 5, 1970), fraternal twin of Darrell
- Darrell "Young" DeBarge (born June 5, 1970), fraternal twin of Carol

Robert and Etterlene had dozens of grandchildren, several of whom are involved in the entertainment industry. They include:

- Bobby DeBarge III, son of Bobby
- Andrew DeBarge, son of Tommy (born September 28, 1989). His debut album, Your Place, was released in 2008.
- Adris DeBarge, daughter of El. She is an executive assistant for producer Tracey Edmonds.
- Eldra Patrick DeBarge Jr., son of El. His debut album, Welcome to the Lion's Den, was released in late 2012.
- Kyndall DeBarge Sands, daughter of El. She is an actress, singer, and YouTube personality.
- Kristinia DeBarge, daughter of James. She is a singer who appeared on 2003's American Juniors and followed up with a charting album Exposed and the single "Goodbye".
- Cheyanne DeBarge, daughter of Chico and aspiring actress
- Jalyn DeBarge, daughter of Darrell and aspiring actress and musician, linked with band LSBN JNGL

== Recording artists and groups ==
=== Etterlene ===
Etterlene has recorded label releases and gospel material, mostly with her family members, with her independent gospel releases.

=== Switch (Bobby and Tommy) ===
Brothers Bobby and Tommy rose to fame in the late 1970s as members of the R&B group Switch, which recorded exclusively for the Motown label. Earlier, Bobby had joined a group as a background member for Barry White called White Heat. Switch would succeed in 1978 with the top ten R&B single, "There'll Never Be". The group's first two albums became million-selling successes, and the band's success would influence a generation of R&B bands such as Tony! Toni! Toné! and Mint Condition.

=== Bobby ===
In 1981 Bobby and his brother Tommy left Switch and started to mentor their younger siblings in the group DeBarge.Although he remained a collaborator with his brothers and sister, Bobby struggled with personal problems that ended his career. It's Not Over, his only solo project, was released in 1996 following his death in 1995 at the age of 39.

=== DeBarge (Bunny, Randy, Mark, El, and James) ===
Forming in 1979 as The DeBarges, the band initially included four members – Bunny, Randy, Mark and El – who moved to Los Angeles and signed with Motown. There they underwent a two-year training process before releasing their first album in 1981. With the inclusion of 18-year-old James in early 1982, the group changed its name to DeBarge and released its first million-selling album, All This Love, later that year. From 1982 to 1985, DeBarge released three gold-certified albums and released more than ten hit singles. After disbanding in 1986, a reinvented version of the group featuring Bobby and excluding El and Bunny released a record in 1988 before disbanding the following year.

=== El ===
After leaving DeBarge for a solo career in 1986, El had modest success peaking with the song "Who's Johnny" and finding fame as a featured vocalist on several hip-hop and quiet storm-leaning R&B productions. These included most prominently "Secret Garden" with Quincy Jones and his cover of Marvin Gaye's "After the Dance" with Fourplay.

El released his first studio album since 1994, Second Chance, on November 30, 2010.

=== Bunny ===
In 1986, Motown released Bunny's only solo project, In Love, which flopped due to the label's failure to promote it despite her first single, "Save The Best For Me". Most known for writing the songs "I Like It" and "A Dream," Bunny now records independently as a gospel artist. She, Randy, James, and her daughter appeared on an episode of Lifechangers.

=== James ===
Though he has not had any solo success since DeBarge's breakup, James is most notable for his personal relationship and short marriage to R&B and pop singer Janet Jackson during the early 1980s. He and Jackson annulled their marriage in 1985 because of the former's drug problems and disapproval from Jackson's parents Joseph and Katherine.

In 2001, he recorded a song with Won-G Bruny and Traci Bingham called Nothing's Wrong. The music video, instead of featuring Traci, had James lip-sync both his and Traci's parts of the chorus.

=== Chico ===
Chico was 18 when he released his first album in 1985. The first single, "Talk to Me", became a top 40 hit. Chico created neo-soul music under the UMG label Kedar Records, and in 1997 he recorded the album Long Time No See. He is the only family member to date to have achieved certified gold album status as a solo artist.

=== Kristinia ===
James' daughter Kristinia was 19 when Island Records released her debut album, Exposed, in July 2009.
