= Mark DeBarge =

American R&B/soul singer-songwriter and musician

- Also known as: Marty
- Born: Mark DeBarge; June 19, 1959 (age 67); Detroit, Michigan, U.S.
- Origin: Grand Rapids, Michigan
- Genres: R&B; soul; gospel
- Occupations: Singer-songwriter; musician
- Instruments: Vocals; trumpet; flugelhorn
- Years active: 1979–present
- Label: Motown
- Formerly of: DeBarge

Mark "Marty" DeBarge (born June 19, 1959) is an American R&B/soul singer-songwriter and multi-instrumentalist. In addition to being a drummer and percussionist, he plays a variety of wind instruments, such as the saxophone, trumpet, flugelhorn and flute. He is best known for his work as a founding member of 1980s Motown singing family group DeBarge. He is also known for writing the group's popular album track, "Stay With Me", later covered by the likes of The Notorious B.I.G., Ashanti and Mariah Carey.

== Biography ==
=== Early years ===
Mark was born in Detroit, Michigan as the fifth of ten children to Robert Louis DeBarge, Sr. (1932-2009) and Etterlene (née Abney) DeBarge (1935-2024). His father, Robert DeBarge, is of French descent, while his mother, Etterlene, is of African American and American Indian descent. DeBarge sang in his local church choir as a child. Later, after his family moved to Grand Rapids, he and the rest of his family began performing at Bethel Pentecostal church, where his uncle William Charles Abney, Jr. was pastor. His father Robert was reportedly physically and sexually abusive towards his children, leading to his and Etterlene’s divorce in 1974. DeBarge and his brothers and sister were inspired by soul singers such as Marvin Gaye and brother Bobby DeBarge, who was the writer, lead singer, and pianist for the group Switch in the late 1970s. In 1980, Motown Records signed Mark DeBarge and his brothers El and Randy and sister Bunny to a recording contract, with the group being known as DeBarge. The group released their debut album, The DeBarges on April 6, 1981.

=== DeBarge ===
By the time the group's second album, 1982's All This Love was released, brother James had joined the group. The second album was the group's first album to score hits and included songs such as "I Like It" and "All This Love", which featured Mark on backing vocals as well as playing the flugelhorn. Throughout the 1980s, other DeBarge hits included "Love Me in a Special Way", "Time Will Reveal", "Rhythm of the Night", and "Who's Holding Donna Now".

Mark remained in the group when brother El and sister Bunny left in 1986 for solo careers. Brother Bobby joined the group. DeBarge was released from Motown following the departure of El and Bunny and the group signed with the independent Striped Horse Records. Soon after, the new DeBarge line-up released the album Bad Boys, but it contained no hit singles. DeBarge split up in 1989 after the convictions of brothers Bobby and Chico on drug trafficking charges.

Mark, El, James, Randy, Bunny, twins Darryl and Carol, and all the siblings' mother Etterlene got together as The DeBarge Family and released the 1991 gospel album Back on Track.

=== Later years ===
Mark is the father of six children. A girl, four boys, and another child: Lakeysha, Mark Jr., Devyn, Piper, Michael, and Giovanni Debarge. Mark DeBarge lives in California according to mother Etterlene in an article about his family in Jet.

== Discography ==
with DeBarges

- The DeBarges (1981)
- All This Love (1982)
- In a Special Way (1983)
- Rhythm of the Night (1985)
- Bad Boys (1987)
- Back on Track (1991)
