= Ride wit Me =

2001 single by Nelly

Single by Nelly featuring City Spud

from the album Country Grammar
- B-side: "Come Over"; "Icey"
- Released: February 13, 2001
- Studio: Unique (New York City)
- Genre: Pop; hip-hop
- Length: 4:51 (album version); 4:13 (radio edit)
- Label: Fo' Reel Entertainment; Universal
- Composer: Jason "Jay E" Epperson
- Lyricists: Nelly; William DeBarge; Etterline Jordan; El DeBarge
- Producer: Jason "Jay E" Epperson

Nelly singles chronology
"E.I." (2000)	"Ride wit Me" (2001)	"Where the Party At" (2001)

Music video
- "Ride wit Me" on YouTube

"Ride wit Me" is a song by American rapper Nelly featuring City Spud. It was released on February 13, 2001, as the third single from Nelly's debut studio album, Country Grammar (2000). "Ride wit Me" peaked at number three on the US Billboard Hot 100 chart and peaked within the top 10 of the charts in Australia, Ireland, the Netherlands, Norway, and the United Kingdom.

== Composition ==
"Ride wit Me" started out in 1999 as one of four demo songs shopped by Nelly to various record labels. All four (including "Country Grammar (Hot Shit)", "E.I." and "Batter Up") were released as singles from Country Grammar. The song was written by Nelly and Jason "Jay E" Epperson, and it interpolates the 1982 song "I Like It" by DeBarge, so William DeBarge, Etterline Jordan, and El DeBarge were also given writing credits.

== Chart performance ==
In the United States, "Ride wit Me" became Nelly's highest-charting single at the time, peaking at number three on the Billboard Hot 100. In the United Kingdom, "Ride wit Me" debuted and peaked at number three on the UK Singles Chart on May 13, 2001—for the week ending date May 19, 2001—becoming Nelly's highest-charting song in Britain until October 2002, when his duet with Kelly Rowland, "Dilemma", became his first chart-topper on the UK Singles Chart.

== Music video ==
Largely inspired by the 1977 film Smokey and the Bandit, and also referencing the 1980s television comedy The Dukes of Hazzard and the 1967 film Cool Hand Luke, the video (directed by Marc Klasfeld) sees Nelly and Ali driving to a dilapidated bar occupied by St. Lunatics members Kyjuan, Slo-Down and Murphy Lee to throw a party. Ali drives a Peterbilt 379 truck filled with women, while Nelly drives a 1978 Pontiac Firebird Trans Am along a desert road, as the video follows their journey and eventual encounters with police, hitchhikers and other roadside incidents. The video culminates with their arrival and a party taking place outside the bar. Featured artist City Spud provides the third verse; however, due to being incarcerated, he does not appear in the music video; Nelly and the St. Lunatics lip-sync his lines. The video won Best Rap Video at the 2001 MTV Video Music Awards, also receiving a nomination for Viewer's Choice.

== Track listings ==
UK CD single

1. "Ride wit Me" (clean edit with FX)
2. "Ride wit Me" (Stargate mix)
3. "Come Over"
4. "Ride wit Me" (video)

UK 12-inch single

A1. "Ride wit Me" (album version)
B1. "Ride wit Me" (Stargate mix)
B2. "Ride wit Me" (clean edit with FX)

European CD single

1. "Ride wit Me" (clean edit with FX short) – 4:15
2. "Ride wit Me" (Stargate mix) – 4:35

Australian CD single

1. "Ride wit Me" (clean edit with FX short) – 4:15
2. "Ride wit Me" (dirty LP version) – 4:51
3. "Ride wit Me" (Stargate remix) – 4:35
4. "Icey" (featuring St. Lunatics) – 4:14

== Credits and personnel ==
Credits are taken from the Country Grammar liner notes.

Studios

- Recorded at Unique Studios (New York City)
- Mixed at Sound on Sound Studios (New York City)
- Mastered at Powers House of Sound (New York City)

Personnel

- Nelly – lyrics
- Jason "Jay E" Epperson – music, production
- William DeBarge – writing ("I Like It")
- Etterline Jordan – writing ("I Like It")
- El DeBarge – writing ("I Like It")
- City Spud – featured vocals
- Steve Eigner – recording, engineering
- Kenny Dykstra – recording and engineering assistance
- Rich Travali – mixing
- Jason Standard – mixing assistance
- Herb Powers – mastering

== Charts ==
=== Weekly charts ===
Chart (2001)	Peak position
Australia (ARIA)	4
Australian Urban (ARIA)	1
Austria (Ö3 Austria Top 40)	60
Belgium (Ultratop 50 Flanders)	27
Belgium (Ultratip Bubbling Under Wallonia)	2
Canada CHR (Nielsen BDS)	4
Europe (Eurochart Hot 100)	16
France (SNEP)	43
Germany (GfK)	25
Ireland (IRMA)	4
Netherlands (Dutch Top 40)	5
Netherlands (Single Top 100)	6
New Zealand (Recorded Music NZ)	20
Norway (VG-lista)	7
Scotland Singles (OCC)	8
Sweden (Sverigetopplistan)	14
Switzerland (Schweizer Hitparade)	22
UK Singles (OCC)	3
UK Dance (OCC)	5
UK Hip Hop/R&B (OCC)	1
US Billboard Hot 100	3
US Hot R&B/Hip-Hop Songs (Billboard)	34
US Pop Airplay (Billboard)	3
US Rhythmic Airplay (Billboard)	1

=== Year-end charts ===
Chart (2001)	Position
Australia (ARIA)	40
Canada Radio (Nielsen BDS)	49
Ireland (IRMA)	37
Netherlands (Dutch Top 40)	33
Netherlands (Single Top 100)	59
Sweden (Hitlistan)	83
UK Singles (OCC)	58
UK Urban (Music Week)	31
US Billboard Hot 100	18
US Mainstream Top 40 (Billboard)	6
US Rhythmic Top 40 (Billboard)	1

== Certifications ==
Region	Certification	Certified units/sales
Australia (ARIA)	Platinum	70,000^{^}
Denmark (IFPI Danmark)	Gold	45,000^{‡}
Germany (BVMI)	Gold	250,000^{‡}
New Zealand (RMNZ)	4× Platinum	120,000^{‡}
United Kingdom (BPI)	2× Platinum	1,200,000^{‡}
United States (RIAA)	5× Platinum	5,000,000^{‡}
^{^} Shipments figures based on certification alone.^{‡} Sales+streaming figures based on certification alone.

== Release history ==
Region	Date	Format(s)	Label(s)	Ref.
United States	February 13, 2001	Rhythmic contemporary radio	Fo' Reel; Universal	
United States	February 27, 2001	Contemporary hit radio	Fo' Reel; Universal	
United Kingdom	May 7, 2001	12-inch vinyl; CD; cassette	Fo' Reel; Universal	
Australia	September 3, 2001	CD	Fo' Reel; Universal	

== Covers and live performances ==
Nelly joined with country music duo Florida Georgia Line to perform "Ride wit Me" and the remix of their hit single "Cruise" at the 2013 American Music Awards.

Pop singer Slayyyter released a cover of the song on August 2, 2019.
