= You Wear It Well (DeBarge song) =

Single by DeBarge

from the album Rhythm of the Night
- Released: August 1985
- Recorded: 1984–85
- Genre: R&B
- Label: Gordy
- Songwriters: El DeBarge, Chico DeBarge
- Producer: El DeBarge

DeBarge singles chronology
"Who's Holding Donna Now" (1985)	"You Wear It Well" (1985)	"The Heart Is Not So Smart" (1986)

"You Wear It Well" is a song recorded by DeBarge for the Gordy label. It was released as the third single off their fourth album, Rhythm of the Night in August 1985; the single release was credited to "El DeBarge with DeBarge."

The song eventually reached number 7 on the Billboard R&B chart and number 46 on the Billboard Hot 100 chart. "You Wear It Well" also spent two weeks atop the Billboard Hot Dance Club Play chart in October and November 1985. El DeBarge made a guest appearance on the NBC sitcom The Facts of Life on November 2, 1985, at the same time the single was released and performed it with the show's principal stars, Lisa Whelchel, Kim Fields, Mindy Cohn, and Nancy McKeon, who provided backup vocals. El also performed the song on the "Bought and Paid For" episode of Miami Vice, which aired three weeks later.

== Track listing and formats ==
- US 7" vinyl single

A: "You Wear It Well" (edit) – 3:52
B: "Baby, Won't Cha Come Quick" – 4:30

- US 12" vinyl single

A: "You Wear It Well" (Club Mix) – 6:55
B1: "You Wear It Well" (Dub Mix) – 5:06
B2: "Baby, Won't Cha Come Quick" – 4:30

- UK 12" vinyl single

A: "You Wear It Well" (Club Mix) – 6:55
B: "Baby, Won't Cha Come Quick" – 4:32

Other versions

"You Wear It Well" (M&M Mix) – 6:53
"You Wear It Well" (M&M Dub Mix) – 5:20
"You Wear It Well" (Short Mix) – 3:53 (available on the 20th Century Masters – The Millennium Collection: The Best of DeBarge and Definitive Collection)

== Charts ==
=== Weekly charts ===
Chart (1985–1986)	Peak position
US Billboard Hot 100	46
US Dance Club Songs (Billboard)	1
US Hot Black Singles (Billboard)	7

== Personnel ==
- El DeBarge – lead and backing vocals, keyboards, synthesizer programming, drums, percussion
- Paul Fox – synthesizer programming
- Jesse Johnson – guitars
- Tommy DeBarge – bass
- Mark DeBarge – percussion
- Jim Gilstrap – backing vocals
- Bunny Hull – backing vocals
- Remix versions done by - John Morales and Sergio Munzibai

== See also ==
- List of number-one dance singles of 1985 (U.S.)
