= Gemini (El DeBarge album) =

Album by El DeBarge

Studio album by El DeBarge
- Released: February 20, 1989
- Recorded: 1988–1989
- Studios: Vixen Playhouse (Canoga Park, California); Yamaha R & D Studio (Glendale, California); Ameraycan Studios, One On One Studios and Larrabee Sound Studios (North Hollywood, California); Conway Studios (Hollywood, California; Westlake Studios (Los Angeles, California); Garden Rake Studio (Sherman Oaks, California); JHL Sound (Pacific Palisades, California)
- Genres: R&B; Soul
- Length: 41:39
- Label: Motown Records
- Producers: El DeBarge (tracks 1–6, 9 & 10); Jay Graydon (tracks 7 & 8); Gardner Cole (track 8)

El DeBarge chronology
El DeBarge (1986)	Gemini (1989)	In The Storm (1992)

Professional ratings
Review scores
Source	Rating
Hi-Fi News & Record Review	A:1*
Los Angeles Times	3/5 stars
Tom Hull – on the Web	B
Allmusic	3/5 stars
The Village Voice	B+

Gemini is the second album by American R&B singer El DeBarge released in 1989 on Motown Records. The album peaked at No. 35 on the Billboard Top R&B Albums charts.

== Overview ==
The lead single, "Real Love", reached No. 8 on the Billboard Hot R&B Songs chart, as well No. 11 on the Billboard Dance Single Sales chart, and No. 14 on the Billboard Dance Music/Club Play Singles chart. A second single, "Somebody Loves You", reached No. 24 on the Billboard Hot R&B Songs chart.

== Critical reception ==
Connie Johnson of the Los Angeles Times, in a 3/5 stars review remarked, "If we pray together, maybe we can stay together,” El DeBarge earnestly sings on one track in a manner that recalls Marvin Gaye’s classic “What's Going On.” The Gaye influence has always been obvious in this singer-songwriter’s music, and “Gemini” sounds like Gaye-meets-Guy."

Jason Elias of Allmusic praised the album saying, "El DeBarge's first solo effort failed to lure the pop audience and left many R&B fans disenchanted. Gemini, released three years later, comes close to achieving the singer's potential as a solo artist. Since Gemini is mostly a self-production, it bares El's harmonic imprint and is more adventurous than many of the R&B albums released around the same time."

Robert Christgau of the Village Voice called Gemini, "Just good black music, ancient to the future, all jumping rhythms and space-case melody, less catchy song than gorgeous sound."

== Track listing ==
No.	Title	Writer(s)	Length
1.	"Real Love"	El DeBarge, Darryl DeBarge	4:08
2.	"Cross My Heart"	E. DeBarge, D. DeBarge	6:12
3.	"Somebody Loves You"	E. DeBarge, D. DeBarge	5:06
4.	"Broken Dreams"	E. DeBarge, D. DeBarge, Tony Radic	3:59
5.	"Broken Dreams (reprise)"	E. DeBarge, D. DeBarge, Radic	1:52
6.	"Turn The Page"	E. DeBarge, D. DeBarge	5:02
7.	"After You"	Jay Graydon, Clif Magness, Glen Ballard	4:26
8.	"Love Life"	Graydon, Gardner Cole	4:20
9.	"Think About It"	E. DeBarge, D. DeBarge, Radic	1:19
10.	"Make You Mine"	E. DeBarge, D. DeBarge	4:24

== Personnel ==
- El DeBarge – lead vocals, backing vocals (1–4, 6, 10), keyboards (1–4, 6, 10), synthesizers (1–4, 6, 10), vocoder (1), drum programming (1), drums (2, 6, 10)
- Jeff Lorber – additional keyboards (1), additional synthesizers (4), synthesizer solo (4), additional synthesizer programming (6)
- Robbie Buchanan – additional synthesizer programming (1), synthesizers (2, 10), programming (2, 10)
- Marcus Ryle – additional synthesizer programming (1, 3)
- Craig Harris – vocoder programming (1)
- Aaron Zigman – keyboard overdubs (3)
- Bill Cantos – synthesizer orchestra (7)
- Jay Graydon – synthesizer orchestra (7), guitar solo (7), synthesizer band (8)
- Clif Magness – synthesizer orchestra (7), backing vocals (7)
- Gardner Cole – synthesizer band (8), backing vocals (8)
- Paul Jackson Jr. – guitars (1, 2, 4, 6), guitar solo (4)
- Nathan East – bass (1, 3, 4, 6, 10)
- Tommy DeBarge – bass (2)
- Abraham Laboriel – bass (8)
- Ricky Lawson – drums (3, 4)
- Ollie E. Brown – percussion (1, 3), special effects (1, 3)
- Paulinho da Costa – percussion (2, 6)
- Don Myrick – saxophone solo (3, 4)
- Plain White Rappers – party crowd (1)
- Alex Brown – backing vocals (1, 6, 10)
- Lynn Davis – backing vocals (1, 3, 4, 6)
- Jim Gilstrap – backing vocals (1–4, 6)
- Portia Griffin – backing vocals (1, 6)
- Marlena Jeter – backing vocals (1)
- Valerie Pinkston – backing vocals (1)
- Tony Warren – backing vocals (1)
- Bunny DeBarge – backing vocals (2)
- Carl Carwell – backing vocals (6, 10)
- Carolyn Willis – backing vocals (6)
- James DeBarge – backing vocals (10)
- Josie James – backing vocals (10)
- Tony Redic – backing vocals (10)

== Production ==
- El DeBarge – producer and arrangements (1–6, 9, 10)
- Jay Graydon – producer and arrangements (7, 8)
- Gardner Cole – producer and arrangements (8)
- Glen Ballard – arrangements (7)
- Clif Magness – arrangements (7)
- Debbie Sandridge – creative director
- JA – art direction
- Bacon/O'Brien Design – design
- Greg Gorman – photography
- Fred Moultrie for Moultrie Entertainment Group – management, direction

Technical credits

- Chris Bellman – mastering at Bernie Grundman Mastering (Hollywood, California)
- Barney Perkins – recording (1, 2)
- El DeBarge – mixing (1)
- Taavi Mote – mixing (1)
- Mick Guzauski – mixing (2–4, 6)
- Jay Graydon – engineer (7, 8)
- Tommy Vicari – mixing (10)
- Elliott Peters – additional engineer (1, 2), recording (3, 4, 6, 10)
- Frank Wolf – additional engineer (1, 2)
- Andy Batwinas – assistant engineer (1)
- Greg Loskorn – assistant engineer (1, 4, 6)
- Pat Stoltz – assistant engineer (1)
- Brad Sundberg – assistant engineer (1, 6)
- Richard McKernan – assistant engineer (2, 3, 10)
- Bernard Fringes – assistant engineer (3, 4)

== Charts ==
Chart (1989)	Peak position
U.S. Billboard Top R&B Albums	35
