= Randy DeBarge =

- Also known as: Randy DeBarge
- Born: William Randall DeBarge; August 6, 1958 (age 68); Detroit, Michigan, U.S.
- Origin: Grand Rapids, Michigan, U.S.
- Genres: R&B; soul
- Occupations: Singer; guitarist
- Instruments: Vocals; bass guitar
- Years active: 1979–present
- Label: Motown
- Formerly of: DeBarge

William Randall DeBarge (born August 6, 1958) is an American R&B/soul singer and bass guitarist, best known as a founding and original member of the popular Motown singing family group DeBarge. Randy is also known for singing co-lead and penning lyrics with brother El on the group's first hit, "I Like It" (1982).

== Biography ==
=== Early years ===
Born in Detroit, Michigan growing up in Grand Rapids, Michigan, Randy was the fourth eldest of ten children born to Robert DeBarge Sr. and Etterlene DeBarge. The DeBarge kids all sang in church and in high school, Randy joined the local band and learned how to play bass guitar from his elder brother Tommy. When Randy was seventeen, his older brothers Bobby and Tommy formed the Ohio-based funk/soul group Switch, later on signing with Motown in 1977. Three years later, Motown signed Randy, El, Bunny and Mark DeBarge to Motown where they had formed the DeBarges shortening it to DeBarge following the release of their first album in 1981.

=== DeBarge ===
After their 1981 debut, The DeBarges failed to garner any interest, the group decided to write and produce themselves with some help from Berry Gordy's niece Iris, the group released their sophomore release All This Love. After the modest success of the group's funk single, "Stop! Don't Tease Me", the second single, "I Like It" became their first hit reaching number two on the R&B charts and crossing over to number 31. It was co-led by Randy and El, whose higher vocals carried the rest of the group's releases from then on. Within a year, DeBarge was one of the hottest-selling R&B groups in the world scoring hits such as "All This Love", "Love Me in a Special Way", and "Rhythm of the Night". After both El and sister Bunny left for solo careers in 1986, Randy and his brothers recruited oldest brother Bobby to record the group's fifth release, Bad Boys, but due to the record's limited production on the independent Striped Horse label, the record tanked. After a drug conviction befell Bobby and the group's younger brother Chico, the rest of DeBarge disbanded at the end of the eighties.

== Later years ==
A father of five, Randy DeBarge reportedly suffered drug and alcohol addiction but was able to find partial sobriety in the mid-1990s. According to a recent JET article on the whereabouts of the singing DeBarge family, Randy's mother revealed that DeBarge has an incurable disease that was not fatal. DeBarge currently resides in California. On September 21, 2011, Randy appeared on Lifechangers, a daytime show hosted by Drew Pinsky on The CW Television Network. Dr. Drew recommended rehab for drug addiction. Randy entered the rehabilitation program. Randy left 33 days later, against the rehab's and Dr. Drew's recommendation.

== Discography ==
with DeBarges

- The DeBarges (1981)
- All This Love (1982)
- In a Special Way (1983)
- Rhythm of the Night (1985)
- Bad Boys (1987)
- Back on Track (1991)
