= All This Love =

All This Love may refer to:

- All This Love (album), a 1982 album by DeBarge
  - "All This Love" (DeBarge song), the title song
- "All This Love" (Robin Schulz song), 2019
- "All This Love", a 2004 song by the Similou from their album So Hot Right Now
