= You Baby (disambiguation) =

You Baby may refer to:

- You Baby, a 1966 album by the Turtles
- "You Baby" (song), a 1966 song by the Turtles
- You, Baby, a 1968 album by Nat Adderley. The first composition by the same title on the album is an instrumental cover of You (Marvin Gaye song).
- You Babe, a 1988 song by R&B group DeBarge.
- "You Baby," a song by Barry Mann, Cynthia Weil and Phil Spector, later recorded by the Lovin' Spoonful and featured on their album Do You Believe in Magic
