= In Love (Bunny DeBarge album) =

Studio album by Bunny DeBarge
- Released: March 9, 1987
- Recorded: 1986–1987
- Genre: Synth-pop, post-disco
- Length: 39:34
- Label: Motown
- Producer: Aaron Zigman, Jerry Knight, Diane Warren, Guy Roche, Barney Perkins, Reggie Lucas, Jay Graydon, Robbie Buchanan, Galen Senogles, Ralph Benatar

Singles from In Love
- 1. "Save the Best for Me" Released: 1986

In Love is the first and only solo album associated with singer Bunny DeBarge, singer formerly of the famed family group, DeBarge. In Love was released in 1987 on Motown and spawned only one single, "Save the Best for Me". Following its release, DeBarge was dropped from Motown and quietly retired from the music industry.

== Track listing ==
1. "Save the Best for Me" (Aaron Zigman, Jerry Knight) (4:34)
2. "Fine Line" (Diane Warren, Guy Roche) (4:58)
3. "So Good for You" (Jeff Silverman, Nick Trevisick) (4:26)
4. "Dance All Night" (Galen Senogles, Buckley, Lorenzo Pryor, Ralph Benatar) (4:06)
5. "A Woman in Love" (E. Jordan) (4:40)
6. "Never Let Die" (Ralph Benatar, E. Jordan) (4:07)
7. "Let's Spend the Night" (R. DeBarge, E. Jordan, Denzil Miller) (4:39)
8. "Life Saver" (Aaron Zigman, Jerry Knight) (4:01)
9. "I Still Believe" (E. Jordan, Kathi Pinto, Ralph Benatar) (4:03)

== Charts ==
Chart performance for In Love1987 weekly chart performance for In Love
| Chart (1987) | Peak position |
|---|---|
| US Billboard 200 | 172 |
