= List of Hot Adult Contemporary number ones of 1985 =

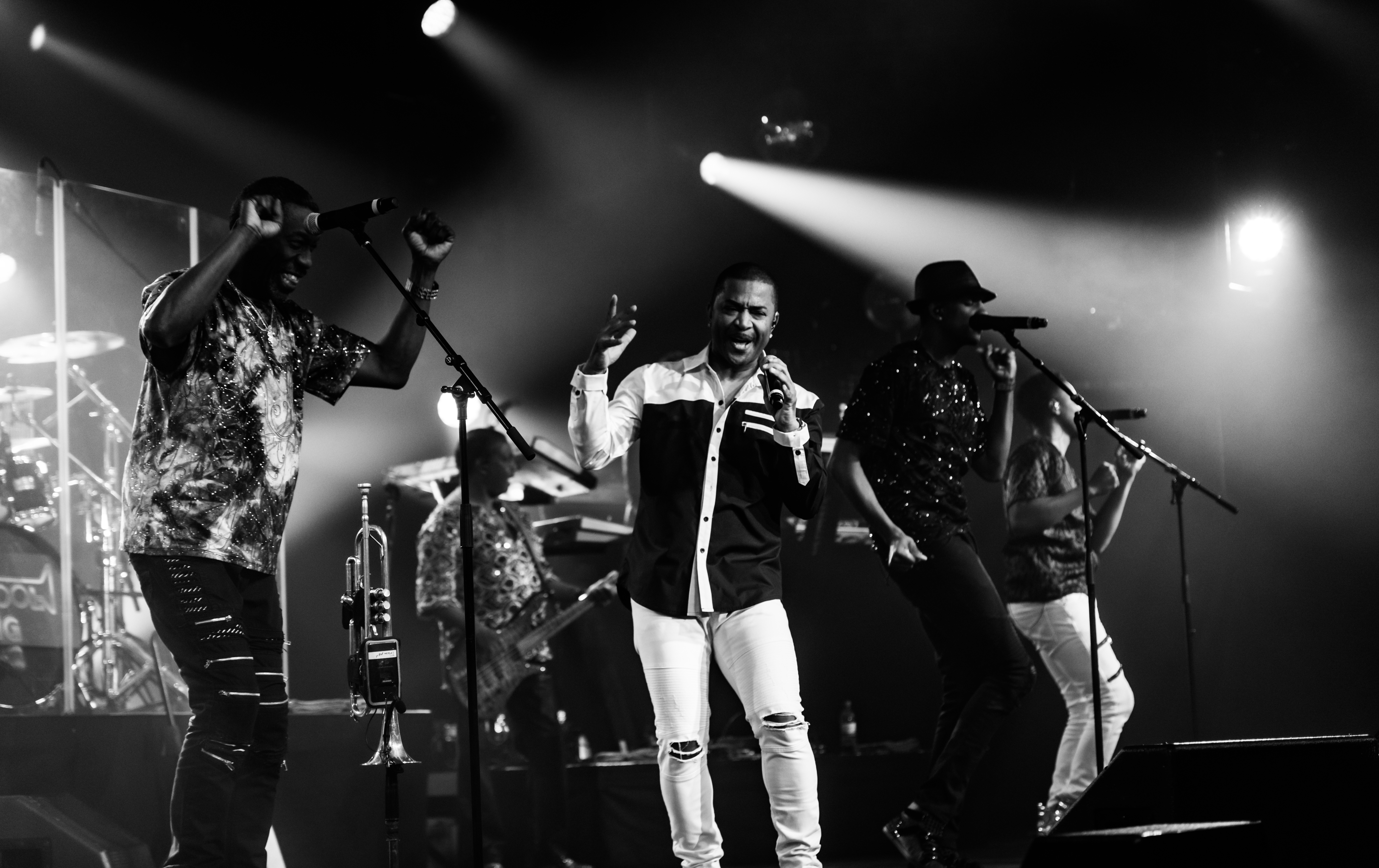
Kool & The Gang (pictured performing in 2017) had the longest-running number one of 1985 with "Cherish".

In 1985, Billboard magazine published a chart ranking the top-performing songs in the United States in the adult contemporary music (AC) market. The chart, which in 1985 was published under the title Hot Adult Contemporary, has undergone various name changes during its history but has been published as Adult Contemporary since 1996. In 1985, 19 songs topped the chart based on playlists submitted by radio stations.

In the year's first issue of Billboard, the number one song was "Do What You Do" by Jermaine Jackson, which was in its third week at number one. It held the spot for a single week in 1985 before being replaced by "All I Need" by the actor Jack Wagner, best known for his role as Frisco Jones on the soap opera General Hospital. While continuing his acting career, Wagner released several albums in the 1980s. Two acts tied for the highest number of weeks at number one in 1985, each spending six weeks atop the chart. Kool & The Gang spent six consecutive weeks at number one with "Cherish", the longest unbroken run at number one during the year. The British singer Phil Collins spent three weeks in the top spot with "One More Night" and the same length of time at number one with "Separate Lives", a duet with the American vocalist Marilyn Martin. The only act other than Collins with more than one number one in its own right was the family group DeBarge, who topped the chart with both "Rhythm of the Night" and "Who's Holding Donna Now", although Lionel Richie and Stevie Wonder each achieved one solo chart-topper and also reached number one as part of the charity supergroup USA for Africa.

Collins was one of a number of British acts to top the chart during 1985, as the American music market continued to feel the effects of the so-called Second British Invasion. Another was Wham!, whose song "Careless Whisper" spent five weeks in the top spot. Despite being taken from a Wham! album, the song was released in the duo's native United Kingdom as a solo single by frontman George Michael; their American label instead opted to release it under the name Wham! featuring George Michael. It was one of several of the year's AC chart-toppers which also reached number one on Billboard's pop listing, the Hot 100. Whitney Houston's "Saving All My Love for You" was a triple chart-topper, reaching the top spot on the Hot 100, the AC chart and the Hot Black Singles listing. Stevie Wonder's "Part-Time Lover" went one better, topping the same three charts and also the Hot Dance/Disco Club Play listing in the form of a remix. USA for Africa's "We Are the World", a charity single intended to relieve starving people in Africa, particularly those feeling the effects of a lengthy famine in Ethiopia, became the fastest-selling American pop single in history and topped the Hot 100, Hot Adult Contemporary and Hot Black Singles listings, as well as the Hot Dance/Disco 12 Inch Singles Sales chart. The final number one of 1985 was "Say You, Say Me" by Lionel Richie, which occupied the top spot for the final four weeks of the year.

== Chart history ==
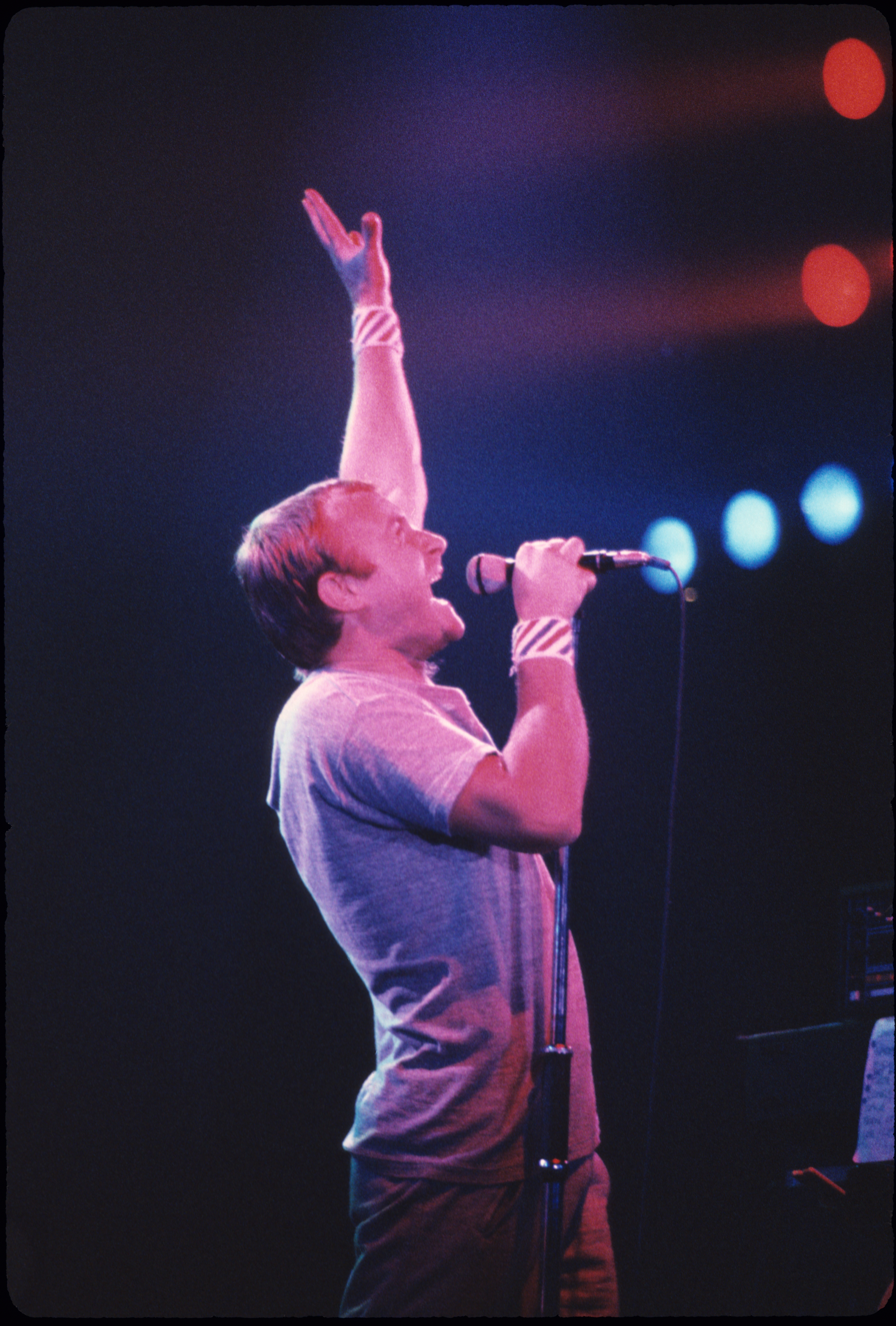
Phil Collins had two number ones in 1985 and spent six weeks in the top spot.

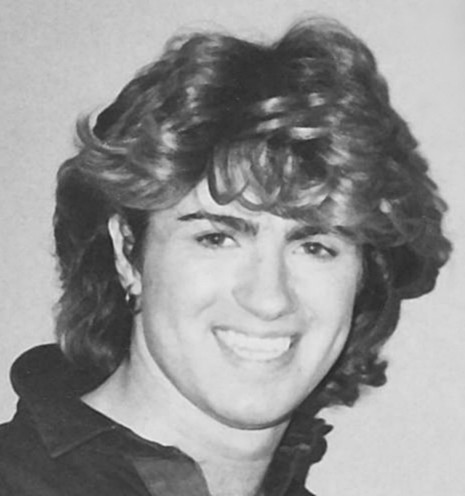
"Careless Whisper" was a number one for Wham! featuring George Michael (pictured). In his native United Kingdom the song was credited to Michael alone.

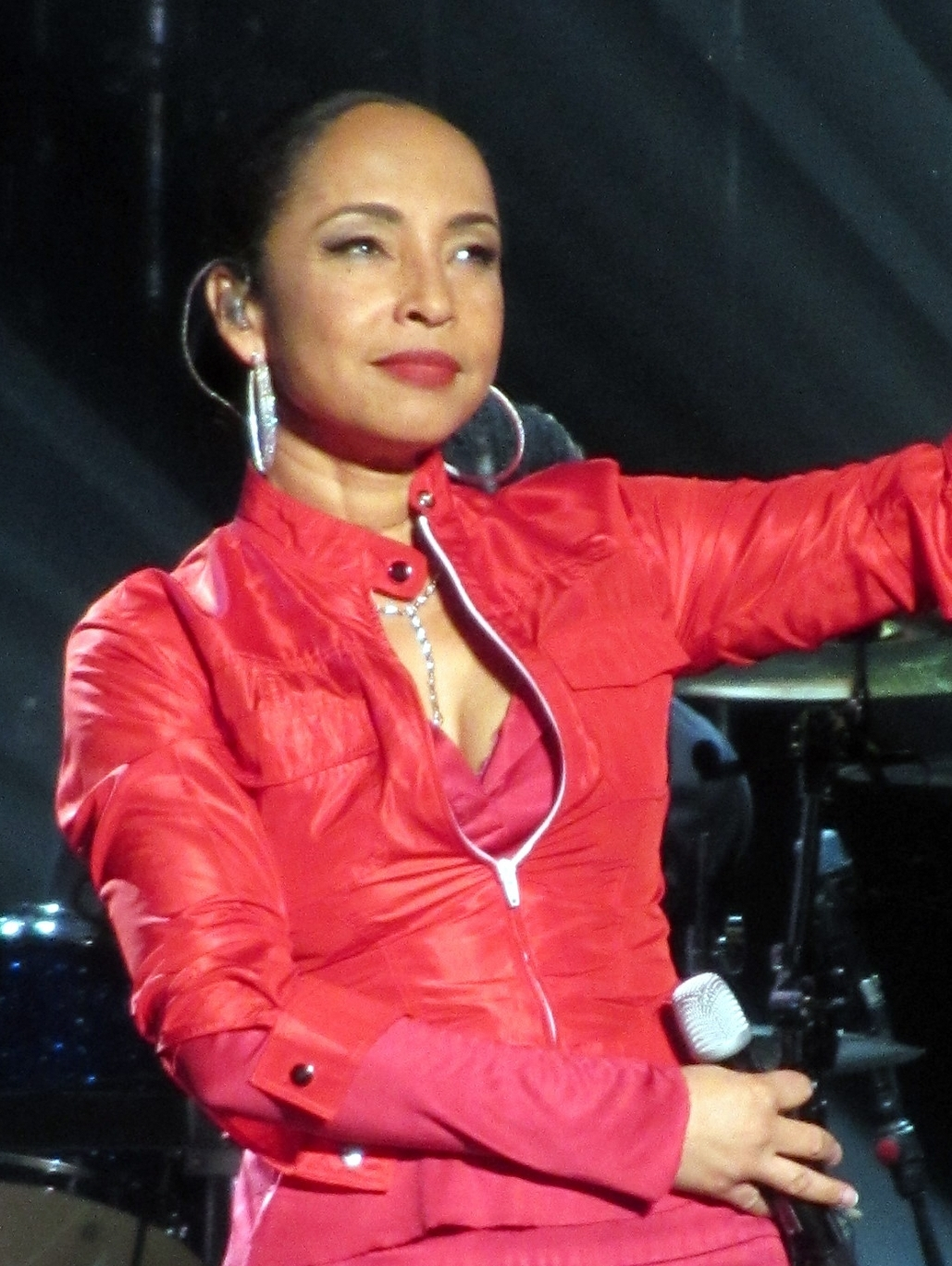
The British band Sade (lead singer Sade Adu pictured in 2011) topped the chart with "Smooth Operator".

Chart history
Issue date	Title	Artist(s)	Ref.
January 5	"Do What You Do"	Jermaine Jackson	
January 12	"All I Need"	Jack Wagner	
January 19	"All I Need"	Jack Wagner	
January 26	"You're the Inspiration"	Chicago	
February 2	"You're the Inspiration"	Chicago	
February 9	"Careless Whisper"	Wham! featuring George Michael	
February 16	"Careless Whisper"	Wham! featuring George Michael	
February 23	"Careless Whisper"	Wham! featuring George Michael	
March 2	"Careless Whisper"	Wham! featuring George Michael	
March 9	"Careless Whisper"	Wham! featuring George Michael	
March 16	"Too Late for Goodbyes"	Julian Lennon	
March 23	"Too Late for Goodbyes"	Julian Lennon	
March 30	"One More Night"	Phil Collins	
April 6	"One More Night"	Phil Collins	
April 13	"One More Night"	Phil Collins	
April 20	"We Are the World"	USA for Africa	
April 27	"We Are the World"	USA for Africa	
May 4	"Rhythm of the Night"	DeBarge	
May 11	"Smooth Operator"	Sade	
May 18	"Smooth Operator"	Sade	
May 25	"Suddenly"	Billy Ocean	
June 1	"Suddenly"	Billy Ocean	
June 8	"Axel F"	Harold Faltermeyer	
June 15	"Axel F"	Harold Faltermeyer	
June 22	"The Search Is Over"	Survivor	
June 29	"The Search Is Over"	Survivor	
July 6	"The Search Is Over"	Survivor	
July 13	"The Search Is Over"	Survivor	
July 20	"Who's Holding Donna Now"	DeBarge	
July 27	"Who's Holding Donna Now"	DeBarge	
August 3	"Who's Holding Donna Now"	DeBarge	
August 10	"Everytime You Go Away"	Paul Young	
August 17	"Everytime You Go Away"	Paul Young	
August 24	"Cherish"	Kool & the Gang	
August 31	"Cherish"	Kool & the Gang	
September 7	"Cherish"	Kool & the Gang	
September 14	"Cherish"	Kool & the Gang	
September 21	"Cherish"	Kool & the Gang	
September 28	"Cherish"	Kool & the Gang	
October 5	"Saving All My Love for You"	Whitney Houston	
October 12	"Saving All My Love for You"	Whitney Houston	
October 19	"Saving All My Love for You"	Whitney Houston	
October 26	"Part-Time Lover"	Stevie Wonder	
November 2	"Part-Time Lover"	Stevie Wonder	
November 9	"Part-Time Lover"	Stevie Wonder	
November 16	"Separate Lives"	Phil Collins and Marilyn Martin	
November 23	"Separate Lives"	Phil Collins and Marilyn Martin	
November 30	"Separate Lives"	Phil Collins and Marilyn Martin	
December 7	"Say You, Say Me"	Lionel Richie	
December 14	"Say You, Say Me"	Lionel Richie	
December 21	"Say You, Say Me"	Lionel Richie	
December 28	"Say You, Say Me"	Lionel Richie	

== See also ==
- 1985 in music
- List of artists who reached number one on the U.S. Adult Contemporary chart
