= Etterlene DeBarge =

American gospel singer and songwriter (1935–2024)

- Born: Etterlene Louise Abney; October 13, 1935; Royal Oak, Michigan, U.S.
- Died: February 16, 2024 (aged 88); Woodland Hills, California, U.S.
- Occupations: Singer, songwriter
- Years active: 1950–2024
- Spouses: Robert DeBarge (m. 1953; div. 1974) George Rodriguez (m. 1980)
- Children: 10; including Bunny, Bobby, Randy, Mark, El, James and Chico
- Family: DeBarge
- Musical career
- Genres: Gospel
- Instruments: Vocals; piano

Etterlene Louise Rodriguez (previously DeBarge, née Abney; October 13, 1935 – February 16, 2024) was an American gospel singer, songwriter, and the matriarch of the American R&B/soul vocal group DeBarge. She was the author of Other Side of the Pain, which documented her struggles in her marriage to her children's father and her children's rise to fame and struggles under the spotlight.

== Biography ==
=== Early years ===
Born as Etterlene Abney on October 13, 1935, in Royal Oak, Michigan, she was one of twelve children and had a twin sister. When she was a child, her family moved to the Brewster-Douglass housing projects, located on Detroit's Lower East Side. In 1952, she met Army veteran Robert DeBarge, who was from Cicero, Illinois and of French and English descent. The couple married in 1953 and settled in a predominantly black section of Detroit, where they had ten children. In 1972, the DeBarges moved to Grand Rapids, Michigan, where Etterlene's brother, Bishop William Charles Abney, Jr., pastored Bethel Pentecostal Church. Etterlene divorced Robert DeBarge some time in 1974. She later married a second time to Puerto Rican George Rodriguez, leading to the erroneous belief that the DeBarge family was half-Hispanic; contrary to popular belief, they are not of Latino descent.

=== Music career ===
In 1991, with help from her children, Etterlene released a gospel album, Back on Track, under the DeBarge Family moniker. In 2005, she released a second gospel album, A City Called Heaven.

=== Personal life ===
Robert and Etterlene DeBarge had ten children during their 21-year marriage:

- Etterlene "Bunny" DeBarge (born March 10, 1955)
- Robert "Bobby" DeBarge, Jr. (March 5, 1956 – August 16, 1995)
- Thomas "Tommy" DeBarge (September 6, 1957 – October 21, 2021)
- William "Randy" DeBarge (born August 6, 1958)
- Mark "Marty" DeBarge (born June 19, 1959)
- Eldra "El" DeBarge (born June 4, 1961)
- James DeBarge (born August 22, 1963)
- Jonathan Arthur "Chico" DeBarge (born June 23, 1966)
- Carol "Peaches" DeBarge (born June 5, 1970)
- Darrell "Young" DeBarge (born June 5, 1970)

Etterlene had dozens of grandchildren, several of whom are involved in the entertainment industry. They include Kristinia DeBarge, daughter of James, a singer who appeared on 2003's American Juniors followed up with a charting album (Exposed) and single ("Goodbye").

In 2007, Etterline published a memoir titled Other Side of the Pain, recounting her childhood and her family's entertainment history.

She died in Woodland Hills on February 16, 2024, at the age of 88.
