= The Heart Is Not So Smart =

Single by DeBarge

from the album Rhythm of the Night
- Released: May 27, 1986
- Genre: Pop
- Label: Gordy
- Songwriter: Diane Warren
- Producer: Jay Graydon

DeBarge singles chronology
"You Wear It Well" (1985)	"The Heart Is Not So Smart" (1986)	"Dance All Night" (1987)

"The Heart Is Not So Smart" was a moderate hit song recorded by DeBarge for the Gordy label credited to "El DeBarge with DeBarge" on the single release. Relying on an outside producer and songwriters, this song was recorded and released as the fourth single from Debarge's fourth album, Rhythm of the Night.

The song eventually reached number 29 on the U.S. R&B chart and number 75 on the Billboard Hot 100, and helped their album Rhythm of the Night album reach Platinum status.

== Track listing and formats ==
- US 7" vinyl single

A: "The Heart Is Not So Smart" – 4:25
B: "Share My World" – 4:58

- US 12" vinyl single

A1: "The Heart Is Not So Smart" (Club Mix) – 6:27
A2: "The Heart Is Not So Smart" (Club Mix Radio Edit) – 3:54
B1: "You Wear It Well" (Dub Mix) – 6:01
B2: "Share My World" – 5:30

- UK 12" vinyl single

A1: "The Heart Is Not So Smart" (Club Mix) – 6:27
A2: "The Heart Is Not So Smart" (Dub Mix) – 6:01
B1: "You Wear It Well" (Dub Mix) – 5:06
B2: "Share My World" – 5:30

== Charts ==
Chart (1986)	Peak position
US Billboard Hot 100	75
US Hot Black Singles (Billboard)	29

== Personnel ==
- Lead vocals: El DeBarge
- Background vocals: Bunny DeBarge, Mark DeBarge
- Bass: Abraham Laboriel
- Drums: Tyrone B. Feedback
- Guitar: Jay Graydon
- Percussion: John Keane
- Steel drums: Andy Narell
- Keyboards and synthesizers: Marcus Ryles, Michael Omartian, Steven George
- Engineer: Ian Eales, Jay Graydon
- Written by Diane Warren
- Remix versions done by John Morales and Sergio Munzibai
