= El DeBarge (album) =

Studio album by El DeBarge
- Released: May 6, 1986
- Recorded: 1985
- Studios: Garden Rake Studios (Sherman Oaks, California); Image Recording Studios, Studio 55 and Lion Share Studios (Los Angeles, California); Bill Schnee Studios (North Hollywood, California); Conway Studios (Hollywood, California); Can-Am Recorders (Tarzana, California); Yamaha International Recording (Glendale, California)
- Genres: R&B; Soul
- Length: 42:59
- Label: Gordy
- Producers: Peter Wolf; Jay Graydon; Robbie Buchanan; Burt Bacharach; Carole Bayer Sager

El DeBarge chronology
El DeBarge (1986)	Gemini (1989)

Singles from El DeBarge
- 1. "Who's Johnny" Released: April 8, 1986; 2. "Love Always" Released: July 8, 1986; 3. "Someone" Released: December 1986

El DeBarge is the debut solo album of American singer El DeBarge, released on May 6, 1986, by Gordy Records. This album was certified Gold in the US by the RIAA.

== Background ==
This album was produced by both Peter Wolf and Jay Graydon. Singer/actress Vanity sang background vocals on the tune, "Secrets Of The Night".

=== Singles ===
"Who's Johnny," peaked at #3 on the Billboard Hot 100. "Someone" was also a Top 20 hit on the Billboard Adult Contemporary Songs chart.

== Critical reception ==
Professional ratings
Review scores
Source	Rating
AllMusic	2.5/5 stars
The Rolling Stone Album Guide	1/5 stars
Tom Hull – on the Web	B+

Jason Elias of AllMusic wrote, "While the setup and idea are still exciting on paper, [the album] is a disappointment." He also stated that "the majority of the [...] tracks just don't do anything to enliven the product or accentuate his voice," and concluded by writing that "the fact that DeBarge didn't have a hand in producing or writing the songs all but made this ho-hum from the start."

Jonathan Takiff of the Philadelphia Daily News found, "Sweet pop promises of romance match perfectly to El's lilting young man's voice and persona in new material borrowing inspiration from the likes of Kenny Loggins ("I Wanna Hear It from My Heart"), Stevie Wonder ("Someone"), and Mike McDonald ("Love Always," "Don't Say It's Over.").

== Track listing ==
No.	Title	Writer(s)	Length
1.	"Who's Johnny"	Peter Wolf, Ina Wolf	4:11
2.	"Secrets Of The Night"	Albert Hammond, Diane Warren	4:20
3.	"I Wanna Hear It From My Heart"	Diane Warren	4:25
4.	"Someone"	Jay Graydon, Mark Mueller, Robbie Nevil	4:45
5.	"When Love Has Gone Away"	Jack Conrad, Larry Henley	3:08
6.	"Private Line"	Diane Warren	3:48
7.	"Love Always"	Burt Bacharach, Bruce Roberts, Carole Bayer-Sager	5:32
8.	"Lost Without Her Love"	Randy Goodrum, Graydon	4:35
9.	"Thrill Of The Chase"	Alan Roy Scott, Roy Freeland, Gary Pickus	3:47
10.	"Don't Say It's Over"	Diane Warren	4:32

== Personnel ==
Vocalists and musicians

- El DeBarge – lead vocals (1–6, 8–10), backing vocals (1, 3, 5, 6, 8, 10), all vocals (7)
- Peter Wolf – various instruments (1, 3, 10)
- Robbie Buchanan – keyboards (2), select instruments (6, 9), Fender Rhodes (7), Yamaha DX7 (7)
- Laythan Armor – additional synthesizer programming (2)
- David Boruff – additional synthesizer programming (2), saxophone (2, 6)
- Jay Graydon – all instruments (4), select instruments [synthesizers, guitars] (5, 8, 9)
- David Foster – synthesizer solo (4), select instruments (5), additional synthesizers (7)
- Randy Goodrum – select instruments (5, 8)
- Burt Bacharach – additional synthesizers (7)
- Michael Boddicker – select instruments (9)
- Dann Huff – guitars (1–3, 6, 7, 10)
- Marty Walsh – guitars (7)
- Neil Stubenhaus – bass (7)
- Mike Baird – select instruments [presumably drums] (5, 9)
- John Robinson – drums (7)
- Paulinho da Costa – percussion (7)
- Ernie Watts – alto sax solo (10)
- Siedah Garrett – backing vocals (1, 3, 10)
- Phillip Ingram – backing vocals (1, 3, 10)
- Dennis Lambert – backing vocals (1, 3, 10)
- Michael McDonald – backing vocals (1, 3, 10)
- Phil Perry – backing vocals (1, 3, 10)
- Julia Tillman Waters – backing vocals (1, 3, 10)
- Oren Waters – backing vocals (1, 3, 10)
- Ina Wolf – backing vocals (1, 3, 10)
- Vanity – backing vocals (2)
- Tata Vega – backing vocals (4)
- Tommy Funderburk – backing vocals (6)
- Jim Gilstrap – backing vocals (6)
- Bunny Hull – backing vocals (6)
- Tom Kelly – backing vocals (6)
- Richard Page – backing vocals (8)

Music arrangements

- Peter Wolf – arrangements (1, 3, 10)
- Robbie Buchanan – arrangements (2, 6)
- Jay Graydon – arrangements (4, 5, 8, 9)
- Robbie Nevil – arrangements (4)
- Burt Bacharach – arrangements (7)
- Carole Bayer Sager – arrangements (7)

== Production ==
- Tony Jones – executive producer, management
- Peter Wolf – producer (1, 3, 10)
- Robbie Buchanan – producer (2, 6)
- Jay Graydon – producer (4, 5, 8, 9)
- Burt Bacharach – producer (7)
- Carole Bayer Sager – producer (7)
- Gail Pierson – album coordinator
- Johnny Lee – art direction
- Janet Levinson – design
- Greg Gorman – photography
- Chazz – hair
- Jeff Jones – make-up
- Michi – stylist

Technical credits

- Brian Malouf – recording (1, 3, 10), mixing (1, 3, 10)
- Barney Perkins – recording (2, 6), remixing (2, 6)
- Ian Eales – recording (4, 5, 8, 9)
- Jay Graydon – recording (4, 5, 8, 9)
- Dennis Mackay – mixing (4, 5, 8, 9), additional engineer (6)
- Mike Ross – additional engineer (6)
- Michael Bowman – assistant engineer (1, 3, 10)
- Dan Garcia – assistant engineer (1, 3, 10)
- Stephen Krause – assistant engineer (1, 3, 10)
- Glen Holquin – assistant engineer (2)
- Craig Miller – assistant engineer (2)

== Charts ==
=== Weekly charts ===
Chart (1986)	Peak position
US Billboard 200	24
US Top R&B/Hip-Hop Albums (Billboard)	8

=== Year-end charts ===
Chart (1986)	Position
US Top R&B/Hip-Hop Albums (Billboard)	35

== Certifications ==
Region	Certification	Certified units/sales
United States (RIAA)	Gold	500,000^{^}
^{^} Shipments figures based on certification alone.
