= Dance All Night (DeBarge song) =

Single by DeBarge

from the album Bad Boys
- Released: 1987
- Label: Striped Horse
- Songwriters: El DeBarge, Bobby DeBarge
- Producer: DeBarge

DeBarge singles chronology
"The Heart Is Not So Smart" (1986)	"Dance All Night" (1987)	"You Babe" (1988)

"Dance All Night" is a song by DeBarge released as the first single from their fifth studio album Bad Boys.

The song peaked at number 33 on the U.S. R&B chart in 1987.

== Charts ==
Chart (1987)	Peak position
U.S. Billboard Hot Black Singles	33
