= Time Will Reveal (song) =

Single by DeBarge

from the album In a Special Way
- B-side: I'll Never Fall in Love Again
- Released: September 1983
- Recorded: 1983
- Genre: Soul; R&B
- Length: 4:17
- Label: Gordy
- Songwriter(s): El DeBarge; Bobby DeBarge; Etterlene "Bunny" Jordan
- Producer(s): El DeBarge

DeBarge singles chronology
"All This Love" (1983)	"Time Will Reveal" (1983)	"Love Me in a Special Way" (1984)

"Time Will Reveal" is a song by DeBarge, released in September 1983 as the first single off the group's third album, In a Special Way on the Gordy label. It was also the group's biggest hit prior to the group's 1985 hit, "Rhythm of the Night".

== Overview ==
=== Recording ===
By 1983, DeBarge was riding off the crossover success of their 1982 second album, All This Love, which included the title track and "I Like It". Boosted by its success, the group recorded a similar album with In a Special Way. Among the songs chosen for a single was the crossover hit "Time Will Reveal", which was written by sister Bunny DeBarge and brothers El and Bobby.

=== Reception ===
Much like their two previous singles, DeBarge found a hit with "Time Will Reveal", which reached number one on the Billboard R&B singles chart and number 18 on the US Pop singles chart. The success of this record and the preceding singles helped the group attain an opening slot for Luther Vandross' U.S. tour of 1984, in which by then DeBarge had become a national attraction, with their early success being compared to the earlier Motown family act, the Jackson 5.

== Charts ==
Chart (1983–84)	Peak position
US Billboard Hot 100	18
US Billboard Black Singles	1
US Billboard Adult Contemporary	12

Year-end chart (1984)	Rank
US Top Pop Singles (Billboard)	84

== Personnel ==
- Lead vocals and keyboards by El DeBarge
- Background vocals by El DeBarge, Randy DeBarge and Bunny DeBarge
- Drums - Ricky Lawson
- Bass - Nathan East
- Percussion - Paulinho Da Costa
- String arrangement by Benjamin F. Wright, Jr.
- Produced by El DeBarge
- Written by El DeBarge and Tommy DeBarge
- Associate producer - Tommy DeBarge
- Engineer - Barney Perkins

== See also ==
- List of number-one R&B singles of 1983 (U.S.)
