= Bunny DeBarge =

- Also known as: Etterlene Jordan; Etterlene Jordan–Knight; Etterlene DeBarge–Knight
- Born: Etterlene DeBarge; 10 March 1955 (age 71); Detroit, Michigan, U.S.
- Origin: Grand Rapids, Michigan, U.S.
- Genres: R&B; soul; gospel
- Occupations: Singer-songwriter; composer; record producer
- Instruments: Vocals
- Years active: 1979–present
- Label: Motown

Etterlene "Bunny" DeBarge (born March 10, 1955) is an American soul singer-songwriter and the lone female sibling of the Motown family group DeBarge. She was the lead vocalist on the R&B ballad "A Dream", from the group's In a Special Way album, and is also the co-writer of the group's 1982 breakthrough hit "I Like It" and the number-one hit "Time Will Reveal".

== Early life ==
Etterlene "Bunny" DeBarge is the eldest of 10 children, born to Etterlene (née Abney) and Robert DeBarge, Sr. While spending her initial childhood in Detroit, her family moved to Grand Rapids when she was 16. Bunny would later recall years of physical and sexual abuse at the hands of her father, stating that he had started molesting her when she was seven and this carried on until she was 13.

Bunny found solace in music, singing in her uncle's church as a child. She and her brothers soon participated in several groups together in various times. In 1972, DeBarge dropped out of school and married her first husband, with whom she had two children; they later divorced. Bunny taught herself how to write songs and compose melodies, which paid off as she got older.

== Music career ==
In 1979, after a couple years watching her brothers Bobby and Tommy ride to musical stardom as members of the band Switch, Bunny teamed up with her three brothers Randy, Mark and El and became DeBarge. They signed with Motown after their demo tape was passed off by Switch's Gregory Williams to Motown CEO Berry Gordy, who was left impressed by the siblings and soon put the band on a salary.

Between 1979 and 1981, Bunny and her brothers worked behind the scenes mainly on the works of Switch, with Bunny in particular collaborating with her brother Bobby on songs such as "Hold On to My Love", "Love Over and Over Again" and "My Friend in the Sky". In 1981, Bunny co-produced the DeBarges' self-titled debut album and was featured on lead vocals alongside brother El on "Share My World" which they wrote. A year later, in 1982, the group brought along their teenage brother James, and shortened their name to just DeBarge. That year, they released their second album, All This Love, with which the siblings found musical success, particularly with "I Like It", for which Bunny wrote parts of the lyrics, alongside her brothers Randy and El.

The group followed up this success with their third album, In A Special Way, in 1983. The album yielded another hit with Bunny as a lyricist, with the gospel-influenced "Time Will Reveal". The album also included several more highlights including two more Bunny-composed ballads, "Stay with Me" and "A Dream", the last song Bunny took lead vocals on. Like All This Love before it, In a Special Way went gold, paving the way for the group's biggest success in 1985 with the Rhythm of the Night album, with the title track becoming a top five crossover hit.

== Personal life ==
Bunny DeBarge has been married twice. In several of DeBarge's albums, she is listed as Etterlene Jordan and is sometimes referred to as either Etterlene Jordan-Knight or Etterlene DeBarge Knight. Bunny is the mother of four children and a grandmother of fifteen and still lives in Michigan, having moved back to Grand Rapids after years living in California. Much like her brothers, Bunny DeBarge has dealt with drug issues, going back to her teen years, which started with marijuana and moving up to prescription medication during her heyday with DeBarge. It soon escalated to usage of cocaine.

Bunny entered rehab several times to kick her habit. In 2008, she broke her silence issuing her autobiography, The Kept Ones, in which she talked about her father's abuse towards her and her siblings and her dealings with substance abuse. That year she appeared on the debut episode of the TV One series, Unsung, in which she talked about her childhood and her time with DeBarge, along with brothers Randy and James. The trio again appeared on TV three years later in September 2011, on the show Lifechangers alongside Bunny's daughter Janae. James entered the rehabilitation program but left a few hours later. Randy left a few days later. Bunny entered the rehabilitation program and completed her entire experience. After leaving the rehabilitation program in West Hollywood, California, Bunny has been touring and focusing on her new album.

== Discography ==
with DeBarge

- The DeBarges (1981)
- All This Love (1982)
- In a Special Way (1983)
- Rhythm of the Night (1985)
- Back on Track (1991)

Solo

- In Love (1987)
