= Who's Johnny =

1986 single by El DeBarge

Single by El DeBarge

from the album El DeBarge
- B-side: "Love Me in a Special Way"
- Released: April 8, 1986
- Genre: Dance-pop
- Length: 4:08; 6:24 (12" version)
- Label: Gordy
- Songwriters: Peter Wolf, Ina Wolf
- Producer: Peter Wolf

El DeBarge singles chronology
"Who's Johnny" (1986)	"Love Always" (1986)

"Who's Johnny" is the debut solo single by El DeBarge. Released on April 8, 1986 on the Gordy label, the single was used for the film Short Circuit and reached number three on the Billboard Hot 100 and number one on the Hot R&B Singles chart. It was the only solo number 1 single El DeBarge released after he left his family group, DeBarge, that same year. It was released on June 21 on that same year in Japan.

The song was parodied by "Weird Al" Yankovic on his album Polka Party! with the song "Here's Johnny".

== Music video ==
The music video features El DeBarge singing in a courtroom, where a judge is presiding over the trial of Johnny 5 (the robotic protagonist of Short Circuit). A representative of NOVA, the government defense contractor that created Johnny, sits at the prosecutor's table as El DeBarge sings his testimony from the witness stand. Stephanie Speck (Ally Sheedy) and a cardboard cutout of Newton Graham Crosby, Ph.D. (Steve Guttenberg) are also in attendance as adversarial witnesses for the prosecution, implying that El Debarge is playing the co-lead role of Ben Jabituya, played by Fisher Stevens in the film. The prosecutor's sole question during these examinations is the titular line of the song "Who's Johnny?" She plays a VHS tape, labeled "Short Circuit", containing various clips from the movie. Meanwhile, Number 5 wreaks havoc in the courtroom (only his robotic hand is visible to the viewer) with various hijinks, including giving the prosecuting attorney a pair of funny nose glasses, turning up the ceiling fan to create a windstorm of papers, swapping the judge's gavel for an exploding one and calling the fire department, resulting in the judge being sprayed with water. Stephanie and El DeBarge sneak out of the courtroom at the end, covering the camera with a slate on their way out. The prosecutor, still wearing the trick glasses, pops up to deliver the last "Who's Johnny?"

== Personnel ==
- El DeBarge – lead vocals, backing vocals
- Peter Wolf – various instruments, arrangements
- Dann Huff – guitar
- Siedah Garrett – backing vocals
- Phillip Ingram – backing vocals
- Dennis Lambert – backing vocals
- Michael McDonald – backing vocals
- Phil Perry – backing vocals
- Julia Waters – backing vocals
- Oren Waters – backing vocals
- Ina Wolf – backing vocals

=== Production ===
- Peter Wolf – producer
- Brian Malouf – recording, mixing
- Michael Bowman – assistant engineer
- Dan Garcia – assistant engineer
- Stephen Krause – assistant engineer

== Charts ==
=== Weekly charts ===
(1986)	Peak
Australia Kent Music Report	33
Canada Top 100 (RPM)	1
Canada A.C. (RPM)	7
US Billboard Hot 100	3

=== Year-end charts ===
Year-end chart (1986)	Rank
US Top Pop Singles (Billboard)	67
Canada (RPM)	15
