= Rhythm of the Night (album) =

Studio album by DeBarge
- Released: March 14, 1985
- Recorded: 1984–1985
- Studios: Record Plant and Studio 55 (Los Angeles, California); Yamaha Research & Development Studio (Glendale, California); Hollywood Sound Recorders (Hollywood, California); Larrabee Sound Studios (North Hollywood, California); Garden Rake Studios (Sherman Oaks, California)
- Genres: Dance-pop, R&B
- Length: 42:33
- Label: Gordy
- Producers: Jay Graydon; Giorgio Moroder; El DeBarge; Bobby DeBarge; Richard Perry

DeBarge chronology
In a Special Way (1983)	Rhythm of the Night (1985)	Greatest Hits (1986)

Singles from DeBarge
- 1. "Rhythm of the Night" Released: February 23, 1985; 2. "Who's Holding Donna Now" Released: April 15, 1985; 3. "You Wear It Well" Released: August 13, 1985; 4. "The Heart Is Not So Smart" Released: May 27, 1986

Rhythm of the Night is the fourth studio album by DeBarge, released by Gordy Records on March 14, 1985. It reached #19 on the Billboard 200 and #3 on the R&B Album Chart. The album was also certified Gold by the RIAA.

== Background and recording ==
DeBarge continued their success streak with their third album, 1983's In a Special Way. They went back into the studio to record what became Rhythm of the Night. Although the group had creative control, the group's managers Tony Jones and Suzanne de Passe elected to have outside producers to helm the project. Producers included Richard Perry, Giorgio Moroder and Jay Graydon with the members of DeBarge on a few songs. Rhythm of the Night contained six new songs, which were recorded specifically for the album. The remaining songs were old material that had been previously released. "Single Heart" originally appeared in the 1983 film D.C. Cab, while "Share My World" originally appeared on their 1981 debut The DeBarges. When asked why the group's contributions were minimal on Rhythm of the Night, El noted that it was largely due to them being busy touring with singer Luther Vandross.

However, in a 2008 episode of TV One's Unsung, the group members revealed that drugs were the real reason behind their limited involvement. Most of the members were drug addled - much like their brothers in the group Switch. El DeBarge was zero tolerance when it came to drug use, and as such, Motown solely relied on him to complete the album. As the remaining members of the group were increasingly affected by their drug use, El threatened to attempt a solo career on the Vandross tour. Motown then handed El the task of recording and finishing Rhythm of the Night with little to no input from his siblings. Most of the backing vocals were performed by El with an array of session vocalists. James DeBarge mentioned that he had no idea where the studios were to record his vocals and the only song he actually sang on was the title track, while Bunny was asked to sing over the background singers' parts.

When the album was released in early 1985, the label made it obvious about the future of the group. El's picture was enlarged while the other members' photos were downsized. Also, on the singles released from the album, the group was billed as El DeBarge with DeBarge. Despite the success of the album, Motown released the group from their recording contract and offered solo deals to El, Bunny and the youngest member of the DeBarge family, Chico. After modest sales of all three solo efforts, Motown dropped Bunny and Chico, while El left Motown for Warner Bros. Records.

== Singles ==
DeBarge gained airplay on MTV, VH1 and BET with the release of their single "Rhythm of the Night". The song reached #1 on the R&B chart and #3 on the Billboard Hot 100, becoming their biggest hit and jump-starting the career of its writer, Diane Warren. The single was certified gold. This hit single also made an appearance in the film The Last Dragon, which was primarily financed by Motown president Berry Gordy.

The second single "Who's Holding Donna Now" would become the group's second most successful single. The song reached #6 on the Billboard Hot 100 and #2 on the R&B chart. The single was certified gold.

The third single "You Wear It Well" was a moderate hit for DeBarge, reaching #46 on the Billboard Hot 100 and #7 on the R&B chart. This song also went to #1 on the Billboard Hot Dance Club Play chart.

The fourth and final single was the ballad "The Heart Is Not So Smart", which was another moderate hit for the group. It reached #75 on the Pop chart and #29 on the R&B chart. It still gains occasional airplay on radio stations in the U.S.

== Track listing ==
1. "Prime Time" (Clif Magness, Glen Ballard, Jay Graydon) - 4:27
2. "The Heart Is Not So Smart" (Diane Warren) - 4:36
3. "Who's Holding Donna Now" (David Foster, Jay Graydon, Randy Goodrum) - 4:27
4. "Give It Up" (Jay Graydon, Randy Goodrum, Tom Canning) - 4:19
5. "Single Heart" (Giorgio Moroder, Pete Bellotte) - 3:33
6. "You Wear It Well" (Chico DeBarge, El DeBarge) - 4:45
7. "The Walls (Came Tumbling Down)" (El DeBarge, Tony Redic) - 6:45
8. "Share My World" (Bobby DeBarge, Bunny DeBarge, El DeBarge) - 5:36
9. "Rhythm of the Night" (Diane Warren) - 3:49

== Personnel ==
DeBarge

- El DeBarge – lead vocals (1–3, 5–9), keyboards (6–8), synthesizer programming (6), drums (6, 7), percussion (6, 7), backing vocals
- Bunny DeBarge – backing vocals, lead vocals (5, 8)
- Mark DeBarge – backing vocals, lead vocals (4), percussion (6)
- James DeBarge – backing vocals
- Randy DeBarge – backing vocals

Additional personnel

- Glen Ballard – synthesizers (1)
- Jay Graydon – synthesizers (1, 3, 4), guitars (2, 4)
- Clif Magness – synthesizers (1)
- Steven George – synthesizers (2), backing vocals (3)
- Michael Omartian – synthesizers (2)
- Marcus Ryle – synthesizers (2), synthesizer programming (7), synthesizer sequencing (7)
- Robbie Buchanan – synthesizers (3, 4)
- David Foster – electric piano (3), synthesizers (3)
- Steve Porcaro – synthesizers (3)
- Giorgio Moroder – synthesizers (5), synthesizer programming (5)
- Paul Fox – synthesizer programming (6, 7)
- Mike Hightower – synthesizer sequencing (7)
- Jeff Lorber – synthesizers (9)
- Steve Mitchell – additional synthesizers (9)
- Howie Rice – additional synthesizers (9)
- Jesse Johnson – guitars (6)
- Paul Jackson, Jr. – guitars (7, 9)
- Dann Huff – guitars (9)
- Abraham Laboriel – bass (2, 3, 9)
- Nathan East – bass (4)
- Tommy DeBarge – bass (6)
- James Jamerson, Jr. – bass (8)
- Tyrone B. Feedback – drums (1, 2, 4)
- Carlos Vega – drums (3)
- Paulinho da Costa – drums (7), percussion (7, 9)
- Ricky Lawson – drums (8)
- John Robinson – drums (9)
- John Keane – percussion (1, 2)
- Mike Baird – percussion (4)
- Andy Narell – steel drums (2)
- David Boruff – saxophone (4)
- Bill Champlin – backing vocals (1)
- Venette Gloud – backing vocals (1)
- Richard Page – backing vocals (3)
- Jim Gilstrap – backing vocals (6, 7)
- Bunny Hull – backing vocals (6, 7)

Music arrangements

- Glen Ballard – arrangements (1)
- Jay Graydon – arrangements (1–4)
- Clif Magness – arrangements (1)
- Steven George – arrangements (2)
- David Foster – arrangements (3)
- Giorgio Moroder – arrangements (5)
- El DeBarge – arrangements (6, 7), rhythm arrangements (8)
- Benjamin Wright – string arrangements (8)

== Production ==
- Jay Graydon – producer (1–4), engineer (1–4)
- Giorgio Moroder – producer (5)
- El DeBarge – producer (6, 7), co-producer (8), mixing (6, 7)
- Bobby DeBarge – producer (8)
- Bunny DeBarge – co-producer (8)
- Richard Perry – producer (9)
- Ian Eales – engineer (1–4)
- Barney Perkins – recording (6, 7, 8), mixing (6, 7, 8), remixing (9)
- Steve Hodge – additional overdub recording (6, 7), mixing (6)
- Don Smith – rhythm and vocal track engineer (9)
- Michael Brooks – overdub recording (9)
- Glen Holguin – assistant engineer (9)
- Alex Schmoll – assistant engineer (9)
- Jim Scott – assistant engineer (9)
- Steve Hall – mastering at Future Disc (Hollywood, California)
- Bradford Rosenberger – production coordinator (9)
- Benny Medina – project coordinator
- Gail Pierson – project coordinator
- Johnny Lee – art direction
- Janet Levinson – design
- Bobby Holland – photography
- Tony Jones – management

== Critical reception ==
Professional ratings
Review scores
Source	Rating
AllMusic	3/5 stars
Billboard	Positive
Tom Hull – on the Web	B+
The Village Voice	B+

Rhythm of the Night received generally positive reviews. Billboard praised the album as sounding "surprisingly consistent" and called DeBarge "Motown's premier family act". For Allmusic, Craig Lytle had a mixed review, complimenting the singles but panning other tracks as "marginal" while regarding it as Motown's attempt to increase the "pop appeal" of DeBarge.

== Charts ==
=== Weekly charts ===
Chart (1985)	Peak position
Australia (Kent Music Report)	46
Canada Top Albums/CDs (RPM)	19
Dutch Albums (Album Top 100)	41
New Zealand Albums (RMNZ)	21
UK Albums (Official Charts)	94
US Billboard 200	19
US Top R&B/Hip-Hop Albums (Billboard)	3

=== Year-end charts ===
Chart (1985)	Position
Canada Top Albums/CDs (RPM)	67
US Billboard 200	34

== Certifications ==
Region	Certification	Certified units/sales
United States (RIAA)	Gold	500,000^{^}
^{^} Shipments figures based on certification alone.
