= The DeBarges =

Studio album by The DeBarges
- Released: April 22, 1981
- Recorded: August 1980 – March 1981
- Genre: R&B
- Length: 36:45
- Label: Gordy
- Producers: El DeBarge, Bunny DeBarge, Bobby DeBarge

The DeBarges chronology
The DeBarges (1981)	All This Love (1982)

Professional ratings
Review scores
Source	Rating
AllMusic	3/5 stars
Robert Christgau	A−
Tom Hull – on the Web	B+

The DeBarges is the debut album by DeBarge, released by Gordy Records on April 22, 1981. It saw limited success and stalled on the charts; the group felt it was not properly promoted. As a result, they revisited The DeBarges by including two songs on their subsequent recordings: "Queen of My Heart" was included on their third album, In a Special Way, while "Share My World" was included on their fourth, Rhythm of the Night.

== Track listing ==
Side A

1. "What's Your Name" (Bobby DeBarge, Bunny DeBarge, El DeBarge) - 4:35
2. "Dance The Night Away" (Mark DeBarge, Randy DeBarge) - 4:50
3. "You're So Gentle, So Kind" (Bunny DeBarge, El DeBarge) - 4:40
4. "Queen of My Heart" (El DeBarge) - 3:49

Side B

1. "Hesitated" (Bunny DeBarge, El DeBarge, Mark DeBarge, Randy DeBarge) - 3:42
2. "Saving Up (All My Love)" (Bill Gable, Jon Lind) - 4:16
3. "Share My World" (Bunny DeBarge, El DeBarge) - 5:39
4. "Strange Romance" (Joe Blocker, Reggie Andrews) - 5:00

== Personnel ==
=== The DeBarges ===
- Bunny DeBarge – lead and backing vocals, vocal arrangements (1–7)
- El (Eldra) DeBarge – Fender Rhodes, lead and backing vocals, vocal arrangements (1–7), rhythm arrangements
- Bobby DeBarge – keyboards, lead and backing vocals, vocal arrangements (1–7), rhythm arrangements, horn and string arrangements
- Randy DeBarge – bass, lead and backing vocals, vocal arrangements (1–7)
- Mark DeBarge – percussion, lead and backing vocals, vocal arrangements (1–7)

=== Additional personnel ===
- Reggie Andrews – keyboards, rhythm arrangements, vocal arrangements (8)
- Larry Von Nash – keyboards
- Michael Boddicker – synthesizer programming
- Todd Cochran – synthesizer programming
- Charles Fearing – guitars
- Paul Jackson, Jr. – guitars
- Nathan East – bass
- Eddie Watkins, Jr. – bass
- Ollie E. Brown – drums
- Leon "Ndugu" Chancler – drums
- Harvey Mason – drums
- Joe Blocker – vocal arrangements (8)
- Eric Butler – horn and string arrangements
- Clare Fischer – horn and string arrangements

== Production ==
- Producer – Bobby DeBarge
- Co-Producers – Bunny DeBarge and Eldra DeBarge
- Engineer – Bobby Brooks
- Assistant Engineer – Michael Johnson
- Recorded and Mixed at Motown/Hitsville U.S.A. Recording Studios (Hollywood, CA).
- Art Direction – Johnny Lee
- Design – Ginny Livingston
- Photography – Matthew Rolston
