= Stop! Don't Tease Me =

Single by DeBarge

from the album All This Love
- Released: July 12, 1982
- Recorded: 1981–1982
- Genre: Soul, R&B
- Label: Gordy
- Songwriter: El Debarge
- Producers: Iris Gordy & El Debarge

DeBarge singles chronology
"Stop! Don't Tease Me" (1982)	"I Like It" (1982)

"Stop! Don't Tease Me" is a single by DeBarge, released on July 12, 1982 as the first single from their second album, All This Love on the Gordy label. The song eventually reached #46 on the U.S. R&B chart on the week of November 6, 1982, but did not chart in the Billboard Hot 100.

== Charts ==
Chart (1982)	Peak position
U.S. Billboard Hot R&B/Hip-Hop Songs	46

== Credits ==
- Lead vocals: El DeBarge
