= James DeBarge =

American singer (born 1963)

- Born: James Curtis DeBarge; August 22, 1963 (age 63); Detroit, Michigan, U.S.
- Occupation: Singer
- Years active: 1982–2006
- Spouse: Janet Jackson (m. 1984; ann. 1985)
- Children: 3, including Kristinia
- Parent(s): Robert DeBarge, Sr. Etterlene DeBarge
- Family: DeBarge
- Musical career
- Genres: Soul; R&B; pop
- Instrument: Vocals
- Label: Motown

James Curtis DeBarge (born August 22, 1963) is an American R&B/soul singer. He was one of the members of the singing family vocal group DeBarge who became famous with their mid-1980s songs "All This Love", "Love Me in a Special Way", "Rhythm of the Night", and "Who's Holding Donna Now".

== Early life and career ==
James Curtis DeBarge was the seventh child born to Robert DeBarge Sr. and Etterlene Abney DeBarge. Like all of his siblings, he was born and raised on the East Side of Detroit, Michigan. The family later relocated to Grand Rapids, Michigan. As of 2000, DeBarge has worked with DJ Quik on such tracks as "Tha Divorce Song", as well as "Get Nekkid" by slain rapper Mausberg. Also, in 2004, DeBarge made a song with the "Haitian Sensation" Won-G for a remix called "Nothing's Wrong", using the instrumental for the Quik/DeBarge track "Tha Divorce Song". DeBarge also made a small guest appearance in 2006 on the album 818 Antics, by rapper J-Ro, who is associated with the rap group Tha Liks.

== Personal life ==
DeBarge married pop singer Janet Jackson in 1984. The marriage was annulled in 1985 due to his addiction to pain killers and sleeping pills. During their marriage, they lived at the Jackson family home known as Hayvenhurst. In 2016, DeBarge claimed on Growing Up Hip-Hop that he and Jackson have a daughter. Jackson had previously told Vibe magazine in 2001, "They say the kid's in Europe or that one of my brothers or sisters is raising it .... But no, I've never had a child."

DeBarge has three children, including Kristinia.

In 2012, DeBarge was imprisoned after being arrested for assault with a deadly weapon and drug charges. He was released from prison three years later.

== Discography ==
with DeBarge

- All This Love (1982)
- In a Special Way (1983)
- Rhythm of the Night (1985)
- Bad Boys (1987)
