= I Like It (DeBarge song) =

1982 single by DeBarge

Single by DeBarge

from the album All This Love
- B-side: "Hesitated"
- Released: 1982
- Recorded: 1981–1982
- Genre: R&B; soul
- Length: 4:40 (album version); 3:43 (single edit)
- Label: Gordy
- Songwriters: William DeBarge; Eldra DeBarge; Etterlene DeBarge
- Producers: El DeBarge; Iris Gordy

DeBarge singles chronology
"Stop! Don't Tease Me" (1982)	"I Like It" (1982)	"All This Love" (1982)

Audio
- "I Like It - DeBarge" on YouTube

"I Like It" is a song by American family band DeBarge. It was released in 1982 by Motown Records as the second single from their second studio album, All This Love (1982).

== Overview ==
=== Recording ===
After releasing their poorly received self-titled album, the group quickly returned to the studio to record their second album. Choosing to add younger brother James and shortening their name to simply DeBarge, the group returned to Motown's recording studios determined to produce a hit.

The song was musically composed by El DeBarge, who also produced the track with Iris Gordy, with lyrics provided by Randy, El and sister Bunny, who composed the much-copied bridge. While being interviewed for the TV documentary, Unsung, in 2008, co-producer Iris Gordy told El to sing the final ad-libs "I like it, I like it", in a higher register. El responded by telling Iris that she was "trying to make [him] sound like [his brother] Bobby", to which Iris returned with, "you better thank your lucky stars if you sound even close to Bobby".

According to Randy, who was also interviewed for the show, while he wrote lyrics to and sang lead on the song's verses, while Bunny wrote the bridge, which El sung, while Bunny said El "was the producer, he brought it all home". El composed the musical track. It also featured a sing-along type unified harmony which was arranged by El.

=== Reception ===
"I Like It" was released in August 1982 and became the band's first huge hit, peaking at number two on the R&B singles chart while crossing over to the pop singles chart, where it peaked at number 31 helping to make their All This Love album go gold.

It has remained a covered and sampled track in R&B and hip-hop music since its release with some of its lyrics and melodies interpolated or recalled in other songs. The El-sung bridge, "I like the way you comb your hair/and I like those stylish clothes you wear/it's just the little things you do/that shows how much you really care", has been often repeated.

The original song is deemed a "Motown classic" by fans of the label's sound.

=== Cover versions and samples ===
R&B trio Jomanda covered it in 1993, while artists such as Nelly, LL Cool J, Beyoncé, Grand Puba, Wreckx-n-Effect, and Warren G have sampled the song. In July 1993, Jomanda's cover reached #83 on the Billboard Hot 100 and #69 on the Cash Box Top 100.

Jesse Powell also covered the song in 2003 from his album, Jesse.

In a tribute to Motown acts, Chico DeBarge performed the song at the Soul Train Music Awards in 2009 surprisingly hitting the high notes his brother El had hit in the original recording; Chico is known for singing predominantly in the tenor range.

The song is sampled in Nelly's "My Place" and interpolated in "Ride wit Me". Rihanna also interpolated the song in "Rude Boy".

Podcaster, streamer and Ludwig's friend Anthony 'Slime' Bruno sampled the intro and chorus in his song "F**k It, We Bald (feat. Kelby May)", featured in Ahgren's video entitled "The Beat Off 2026".

== Charts ==
De Barge version

Chart (1982–83)	Peak position
US Billboard Hot 100	31
US Hot R&B/Hip-Hop Songs (Billboard)	2
US Cash Box Top 100	24

Jomanda cover

Chart (1993)	Peak position
UK Singles (OCC)	67
UK Airplay (ERA)	74
UK Dance (Music Week)	14
UK Club Chart (Music Week)	15
US Billboard Hot 100	83
US Dance (Billboard)	29
US Maxi-Singles Sales (Billboard)	9
US R&B (Billboard)	45
US Cash Box Top 100	69

== Personnel ==
- Lead vocals by Randy DeBarge and El DeBarge
- Background vocals by DeBarge (Bunny DeBarge, El DeBarge, Randy DeBarge, Mark DeBarge and James DeBarge)
- Produced by El DeBarge and Iris Gordy
- Instrumentation:
  - Ollie Brown: drums
  - Curtis Anthony Nolen, Robben Lee Ford, Charles J. Fearing: guitar
  - Randy DeBarge: bass guitar
  - Mark DeBarge, George Bohannon, Ray Brown and Roy Popper: trumpets
  - Raymond A. Crossley, Russell Ferrante: piano, keyboards
- Additional credits:
  - Written by: El DeBarge, Randy DeBarge, Bunny DeBarge
  - Rhythm Arrangement: El DeBarge, Randy DeBarge, Russell Ferrante
  - Horn Arrangement: Daniel Lemelle
  - Executive Producer: Berry Gordy
