= Back on Track (DeBarge Family album) =

Studio album by the DeBarge Family
- Released: July 1, 1991
- Recorded: 1990–1991
- Genre: R&B
- Label: Truth Ministries

Professional ratings
Review scores
| Source | Rating |
|---|---|
| Allmusic | 2/5 stars |

Back on Track is a gospel-oriented 1991 album by the DeBarge Family including two members of the soul music group DeBarge, released on Truth Ministries. The album consisted of contributions from various members of the DeBarge family. Sales were poor because of limited promotion from the small label, and because El DeBarge did not appear on the album, with the exception of "We Need Your Love".

== Track listing ==
1. "We Need Your Love" (featuring El Debarge)
2. "Coming Home"
3. "You Can Make It"
4. "Close to You"
5. "G.O.O.D. Times"
6. "Trust in Jesus"
7. "Ninety-Nine and a Half (Won't Do)"
8. "Shine"
9. "He Will Make a Way"
