= All This Love (album) =

Studio album by DeBarge
- Released: July 22, 1982
- Recorded: 1981–1982
- Studio: Motown/Hitsville U.S.A. Recording Studios & Artisian Sound Recorders, Inc., Hollywood, California; Kendun Recorders & Yamaha Research & Development Studio, Burbank, California
- Length: 37:37
- Label: Gordy
- Producer: Berry Gordy (exec.); El DeBarge; Iris Gordy

DeBarge chronology
The DeBarges (1981)	All This Love (1982)	In a Special Way (1983)

Singles from All This Love
- 1. "Stop! Don't Tease Me" Released: July 12, 1982; 2. "I Like It" Released: August 20, 1982; 3. "All This Love" Released: October 17, 1982

All This Love is the second studio album by DeBarge, released by Gordy Records on July 22, 1982.

== Reception ==
Professional ratings
Review scores
Source	Rating
AllMusic	4/5 stars
Robert Christgau	B+
The Rolling Stone Album Guide	3/5 stars
Tom Hull – on the Web	B+

After their first album saw limited success, this album featured productions and compositions by the DeBarge members, primarily led by singer El DeBarge, whose countertenor vocals (a mixture of tenor and falsetto) would lead the group to success throughout the mid-1980s. Due to the release of the hit singles "I Like It" reaching number two on the R&B charts and the title track "All This Love" reaching number 5 on the R&B charts and number one on the Adult Contemporary charts, the album eventually reached gold status.

== Track listing ==
1. "I'll Never Fall in Love Again" (El DeBarge/James DeBarge) - 4:37
2. "Stop! Don't Tease Me" (E. DeBarge) - 6:00
3. "I Like It" (Randy DeBarge/E. DeBarge/Bunny DeBarge) - 4:40
4. "Can't Stop" (Crossley/Nolen) - 4:05
5. "All This Love" (E. DeBarge) - 5:52
6. "It's Getting Stronger" (B. DeBarge) - 4:00
7. "Life Begins with You" (B. DeBarge) - 4:48
8. "I'm in Love with You" (M. DeBarge/B. DeBarge) - 3:35

== Production ==
- Executive Producer – Berry Gordy Jr.
- Produced by Eldra DeBarge and Iris Gordy
- Co-Producers – Raymond Crossley and Curtis Anthony Nolen
- Engineers – Bobby Brooks, Milt Calice, Jane Clark, Steve MacMillan, Barney Perkins and Phillip Walters.
- Assistant Engineers – Steve Catania, Michael Craig Johnson and Kevin Sorrells.
- Mastered by John Matousek at Motown Recording Studios (Hollywood, CA).
- Art Direction – Johnny Lee and Terry Taylor
- Design – Terry Taylor
- Photography – Raul Vega

== Personnel ==
=== DeBarge ===
- Bunny DeBarge – backing vocals, lead vocals (6, 7), BGV arrangements
- El DeBarge – keyboards, lead vocals (2–6, 8), backing vocals, rhythm arrangements (1–3, 5–8), horn arrangements (2), BGV arrangements
- James DeBarge – keyboards, backing vocals, lead vocals (1), rhythm arrangements (1), BGV arrangements
- Mark DeBarge – saxophone, trumpet, backing vocals, rhythm arrangements (8), BGV arrangements
- Randy DeBarge – bass, backing vocals, lead vocals (3), rhythm arrangements (3), BGV arrangements

=== Additional personnel ===
- Raymond Crossley – keyboards, arrangements (4), BGV arrangements (4)
- Russell Ferrante – keyboards, rhythm arrangements (2, 3, 6, 7)
- Charles Fearing – guitars, acoustic guitar solo (5)
- José Feliciano – acoustic guitar (5)
- Robben Ford – guitars
- Curtis Anthony Nolen – guitars, arrangements (4), BGV arrangements (4)
- Freddie Washington – bass
- Ken Wild – bass
- Ollie E. Brown – drums
- Ricky Lawson – drums
- Richard Heath – percussion
- Nate Hughes – percussion
- Daniel LaMelle – alto saxophone, tenor saxophone, horn arrangements (1–3, 6), sax solo (6)
- Jeff Clayton – baritone saxophone, flute
- Gerald Albright – tenor saxophone
- Damon Rentie – tenor saxophone
- George Bohanon – trombone
- John Ervin – trombone
- Clay Lawrey – trombone
- Ray Brown – trumpet, flugelhorn
- Cliff Ervin – trumpet
- Roy Poper – trumpet
- Nolan Smith – trumpet, flugelhorn
- Linda Howard – BGV arrangements (1)
- Barbara Mitchell – BGV arrangements (1)
- Benjamin Wright – rhythm arrangements (1, 5, 8), horn and string arrangements (5, 7)
- Janice Gower – concertmaster (5, 7)

== Charts ==
=== Weekly charts ===
Chart (1982–1983)	Peak position
US Billboard 200	24
US Top R&B/Hip-Hop Albums (Billboard)	3

=== Year-end charts ===
Chart (1983)	Position
US Billboard 200	43
US Top R&B/Hip-Hop Albums (Billboard)	6

== Certifications ==
Region	Certification	Certified units/sales
United States (RIAA)	Gold	500,000^{^}
^{^} Shipments figures based on certification alone.
