= In a Special Way =

Studio album by DeBarge
- Released: September 23, 1983
- Recorded: 1983
- Studio: Kendun Records, Burbank; Westlake Audio in West Hollywood
- Genre: R&B
- Length: 38:42
- Label: Gordy
- Producer: El DeBarge

DeBarge chronology
All This Love (1982)	In a Special Way (1983)	Rhythm of the Night (1985)

Singles from In a Special Way
- 1. "Time Will Reveal" Released: August 11, 1983; 2. "Love Me in a Special Way" Released: November 10, 1983

In a Special Way is the third studio album by American R&B group DeBarge, released by Gordy Records on September 23, 1983. It was recorded at Kendun Records in Burbank and Westlake Audio in West Hollywood; written and produced by lead vocalist El DeBarge with additional writing by Mark, James and Bunny DeBarge.

In a Special Way was certified gold in the United States after the release of the singles "Time Will Reveal" and "Love Me in a Special Way", which hit number one on the Billboard R&B and adult contemporary singles chart. The album is most memorable for not only its singles but album tracks such as "Stay with Me" and "A Dream" - largely due to subsequent sampling in modern hip-hop and R&B tracks. The album has been regarded by some critics as the "classic" in the family group's catalog.

== Background and recording ==
Group member Bunny DeBarge revealed the group were given complete creative control because Motown Records founder Berry Gordy liked their sound. Gordy also liked the sound of their brothers' band Switch – who were also signed to Motown – which prompted him to sign DeBarge as well. Originally performing as a gospel group, the siblings changed to performing secular music after gospel music labels were unsure how to market them. After making the move to Los Angeles, DeBarge signed with a small label Source Records- much to Bunny's chagrin. She asked the record company CEO to let them out of their contract, to which he obliged. Their older brother Bobby DeBarge set up a meeting with Jermaine Jackson and Hazel Gordy to sign with Motown, as Jermaine and Hazel were also responsible for bringing Switch to the label. Due to them still being contractually obligated to another label at the time, they could not speak to the group, as it would have been seen as a breach of contract. After waiting out the label release, the group met with Jackson and were signed to Motown.

The group recorded their 1981 debut album, The DeBarges, which failed to chart due to lack of promotion. Things changed for them with the release of their second album, All This Love, due to the success of the singles "I Like It" and the album's title track. They went back in the studio in 1983 to record the follow-up In a Special Way. The siblings recorded the album with the promise that each member would get a song to sing by themselves. In the end, it was determined that each member would be given two songs to perform for the album. According to Bunny, In a Special Way took a few months to record. The reason for the lengthy recording process was to give the group time to work out the songs before recording and decide their intended execution of the material.

Mark DeBarge was initially scheduled to sing lead on "Stay With Me", although no one could locate his whereabouts. At the time, the song was unfinished and the group was hoping to get Mark's input. In the end, Bunny and El were forced to complete the song, with El having to perform lead vocals at the last minute. Bunny also liked the song "Need Somebody", but was critical of its mixing, which she felt watered down the song's sound. She also revealed that "Love Me In a Special Way" was originally conceived as a gospel song. The group also wanted to revisit the material from their debut album, for which they felt was mishandled. They decided to use two songs from the album: "Queen of My Heart", which was included on In a Special Way, while "Share My World" would be included on their next album, Rhythm of the Night. The song "I Give Up On You" was written by James DeBarge with their labelmate Billy Preston, and was recorded at Preston's house.

Recording engineer Barney Perkins was particularly fond of the album's closing track, "A Dream", and played it every time the group came to the studio to record. As they were close to finishing the project, Berry Gordy imposed a deadline for them to complete the album.

== Music and lyrics ==
According to the Lexington Herald-Leader, the album's material veers between "ballad and dance music, somewhere between soul and jazz." AllMusic's Jason Elias attributed its "minimalist and artful sound" to the rumor that the horn tracks were lost during its recording.

== Critical reception ==
Professional ratings
Review scores
Source	Rating
AllMusic	5/5 stars
Lexington Herald-Leader	10/10
Tom Hull – on the Web	A−
The Village Voice	A+

The album was acclaimed by contemporary critics. In a contemporary review, Connie Johnson of the Los Angeles Times wrote that DeBarge "conveys an innocence that's rare in '80s pop music" and, although some songs can be excessively "cute" and sung high-pitched, they are "oddly appealing." The Philadelphia Inquirer wrote that In a Special Way "makes gentle, perfect harmonies seem like a pleasurable dream." The Lexington Herald-Leader largely credited El DeBarge's soft vocals and upbeat arrangements for the group's success on the album and asserted that they appear to be "the future" of Motown. Robert Christgau, writing in The Village Voice, said that he "fell in love with the austere lilt and falsetto fantasy they've pinned to plastic here" because of their superior vocal skills. Christgau felt that its music guilelessly pursues genuine vocal "beauty" and is strengthened by subtle Latinized rhythms. He named In a Special Way the tenth best album of the year in his list for the Pazz & Jop annual critics' poll.

In a decade-end list for The Village Voice, Christgau ranked the album as the seventh best of the 1980s. In his "A+" review of the album in 2002, music critic Milo Miles said that In a Special Way is still the least known of Motown's best albums and called it "a crucial work whose appeal cannot be articulated entirely." Miles praised DeBarge for avoiding "cheap sentiment" in favor of an emphasis on love and wrote that the album achieved "the most elusive prize" in popular music—"romance that is both sensuous and gorgeous and then sustained track after track".

== Track listing ==
No.	Title	Writer(s)	Length
1.	"Be My Lady"	James DeBarge	4:14
2.	"Stay With Me"	Mark DeBarge, Bunny DeBarge	3:45
3.	"Time Will Reveal"	El DeBarge, Bunny DeBarge, Bobby DeBarge	4:09
4.	"Need Somebody"	J. DeBarge	4:45
5.	"Love Me In a Special Way"	E. DeBarge	4:10
6.	"Queen of My Heart"	E. DeBarge	3:35
7.	"Baby, Won't Cha Come Quick"	Bruce Fisher, E. DeBarge	4:32
8.	"I Give Up On You"	Billy Preston, J. DeBarge	3:40
9.	"A Dream"	Bunny DeBarge	4:15

== Personnel ==
=== DeBarge ===
- Bunny DeBarge – lead vocals, backing vocals, rhythm arrangements
- James DeBarge – backing vocals, lead vocals, rhythm arrangements
- El DeBarge – lead vocals, backing vocals, keyboards, rhythm arrangements
- Randy DeBarge – backing vocals
- Mark DeBarge – backing vocals
- Bobby DeBarge – backing vocals

=== Additional personnel ===
- Larry Von Nash – keyboards (6)
- Greg Phillinganes – keyboards (8)
- Michael Boddicker – synthesizer programming
- Charles Fearing – guitars (5)
- Paul Jackson, Jr. – guitars (5)
- Carlos Rios – guitar solo (7)
- Nathan East – bass (2, 3, 5)
- James Jamerson, Jr. – bass
- "Ready" Freddie Washington – bass
- Leon "Ndugu" Chancler – drums (2)
- Ricky Lawson – drums (3)
- Harvey Mason – drums (5)
- Paulinho da Costa – percussion (2, 3)
- Stevie Wonder – harmonica solo (5)
- Jim Gilstrap – additional backing vocals
- Bunny Hull – additional backing vocals

== Production ==
- Eldra DeBarge – producer
- Bobby DeBarge – associate producer
- Barney Perkins – recording, mixing
- Steve Bates – assistant engineer
- Chris Bellman – assistant engineer
- Walter Borchers – assistant engineer
- Dan Marnien – assistant engineer
- John Matousek – mastering at Motown Recording Studios (Los Angeles, California).
- Suzee Ikeda – product manager
- Johnny Lee – art direction
- Janet Levinson – design
- Ron Slenzak – photography
- Valadé / Design Pool – styling

== Charts ==
Year	Album	Chart positions	
Year	Album	US	US R&B
1983	In a Special Way	36	4

=== Singles ===
Year	Single	Chart positions		
Year	Single	US	US R&B	Adult Contemporary
1983	"Time Will Reveal"	18	1	12
1984	"Love Me In A Special Way"	45	11	21

== Certifications ==
Region	Certification	Certified units/sales
United States (RIAA)	Gold	500,000^{^}
^{^} Shipments figures based on certification alone.
