= Who's Holding Donna Now =

Single by DeBarge

from the album Rhythm of the Night
- B-side: "Be My Lady"
- Released: May 14, 1985
- Recorded: 1984
- Studio: Garden Rake (Studio City, Los Angeles)
- Genre: R&B; pop
- Length: 4:28 (album version); 4:06 (single version)
- Label: Gordy
- Songwriters: David Foster; Jay Graydon; Randy Goodrum
- Producer: Jay Graydon

DeBarge singles chronology
"Rhythm of the Night" (1985)	"Who's Holding Donna Now" (1985)	"You Wear It Well" (1985)

"Who's Holding Donna Now" is a song recorded by DeBarge for the Gordy label. It was their second consecutive top 10 Pop hit in the U. S. after the release of "Rhythm of the Night".

After recording the successful dance single, the group returned to their more comfortable standard of ballads. Relying on an outside producer, outside songwriters, and background vocalists Richard Page and Steve George, the song was recorded and released as the second single from their fourth album, Rhythm of the Night.

== Reception ==
The song reached number six on the U.S. Billboard Hot 100 on the chart dated August 10, 1985 and spent four weeks at number two on the R&B chart on July 26, 1985. It also became DeBarge's third song to top the Billboard Adult Contemporary on July 19, 1985.

The song appeared in a late 1985 episode of the daytime soap opera All My Children.

== Track listing and formats ==
- US, 7" vinyl single

A: "Who's Holding Donna Now" – 4:06
B: "Be My Lady" – 4:10

- UK, 12" vinyl single

A: "Who's Holding Donna Now" – 4:27
B: "Be My Lady" – 4:14

== Charts ==
Chart (1985)	Peak position
Australia (Kent Music Report)	57
Canada Top Singles (RPM)	9
Canada Top Adult Contemporary (RPM)	2
Ireland (IRMA)	29
New Zealand (Recorded Music NZ)	44
UK Singles (Official Charts Company)	83
US Billboard Hot 100	6
US Adult Contemporary (Billboard)	1
US Hot Black Singles (Billboard)	2

Year-end chart (1985)	Rank
US Top Pop Singles (Billboard)	85

== Personnel ==
- El DeBarge – lead vocals
- Steve George, Richard Page – backing vocals
- David Foster – electric piano, synthesizers
- Robbie Buchanan – synthesizers
- Jay Graydon – synthesizers
- Steve Porcaro – synthesizers
- Abraham Laboriel – bass
- Carlos Vega – drums

== See also ==
- List of number-one adult contemporary singles of 1985 (U.S.)
