= All This Love (DeBarge song) =

Single by DeBarge

from the album All This Love
- B-side: "I'm In Love With You"
- Released: October 17, 1982
- Genre: R&B; soul
- Length: 5:52 (album version); 4:09 (single version)
- Label: Gordy
- Songwriter: El DeBarge
- Producers: El DeBarge; Iris Gordy

DeBarge singles chronology
"I Like It" (1982)	"All This Love" (1982)	"Time Will Reveal" (1983)

Music video
- "All This Love" on YouTube

"All This Love" is a single by DeBarge, released on October 17, 1982 in the US and July 22, 1983 in the UK. The song was released as the third and final single from their second studio album of the same title on the Gordy label. The single would help DeBarge rise to R&B stardom. A cover version of the song was recorded by Patti LaBelle on her 1994 gold album Gems. A video for her version was also filmed.

== Overview ==
=== History ===
DeBarge had released one album that performed poorly on the charts, and they recorded their second album with their own songs, chiefly written by El DeBarge, the main lead singer and focal point of the group. "All This Love" was one of the songs, a song with a high tenor part; El DeBarge had written it a year earlier in the hopes that then-label mate and longtime idol Marvin Gaye would record it.

Gaye had served as El's inspiration for the song, hinted in the group's vocal harmonizing in the final part of the song, which was similar to Gaye's "I Want You" vocal style period. But by the following year, Gaye left the label. Debarge recorded the song, produced by Berry Gordy's niece Iris. It was the third single from the album, also called All This Love.

The song was featured in a 1983 episode of the US daytime soap opera Days of Our Lives.

=== Reception ===
Much like their first hit, "I Like It", "All This Love" was immediately embraced by the R&B community while the group gained a pop fan base. In the US, The single reached number 5 on the Billboard R&B chart, number 17 on the Billboard Hot 100, and number one on the Adult Contemporary chart, helping its parent album of the same name reach gold status by the summer of 1983.

== Personnel ==
- Lead vocals, keyboards and rhythm arrangement - El DeBarge
- Background vocals - DeBarge
- Keyboards - James DeBarge
- Guitar solo - José Feliciano
- Drums - Ricky Lawson
- Bass - Freddie Washington
- Percussion by Nathan Hughes and Richard Heath
- Guitars - Charles F. Fearing, Curtis A. Nolen, and Robben Ford
- Rhythm, string and horn arrangements by Benjamin F. Wright, Jr.
- Horns - Clarence Lawrey, George Bohanon, John Ervin, Cliff Ervin, Nolan A. Smith, Jr., Raymond L. Brown, Roy Poper and Mark DeBarge
- Flute by Gerald A. Albright
- Produced by El DeBarge and Iris Gordy
- Written by El DeBarge
- Engineering - Barney Perkins
- Executive Producer - Berry Gordy

=== Cover versions ===
- It was covered by American jazz violinist John Blake on his 1987 album Adventures of the Heart with vocals by Gwen Guthrie.
- Pop group Scene 23 from the WB show Popstars recorded a version on the song for their debut album, Introducing Scene 23.
- Detroit-based guitarist Calvin Brooks recorded an instrumental version of it on his 1992 album My Favorite Thing.
- The song was re-recorded by R&B legend Patti LaBelle on her 1994 album, Gems. LaBelle's version, produced by Teddy Riley, was released as a single and peaked at #42 on the Billboard R&B chart. DeBarge and LaBelle later sang the song together as a duet live in concert.
- Mexican-American percussionist Pete Escovedo, along with saxophonist Gerald Albright did an instrumental version of "All This Love" for Escovedo's 1995 album Flying South, which had considerable air time on smooth jazz radio stations.
- In 1996 R&B group Xscape covered the song on the American police drama New York Undercover episode 44 "Sympathy for the Devil" and it also appears on the 1998 soundtrack for the show.
- Los Angeles-based singer/songwriter Bill Cantos recorded a Latin jazz-oriented version on his 2000 album Movie in the Night Sky.
- The song was covered by Boyz II Men and released on their 2007 compilation album Motown: A Journey Through Hitsville USA of Motown hits.
- Johnny Mathis covered the song on his 2008 album, A Night to Remember.

=== Samples ===
- In 1988, rapper MC Shy D sampled the song for "Atlanta, That's Where I Stay".
- West side rapper Skee-lo sampled "All This Love" in the "I Wish (Street Mix)" remix of his hit song "I Wish" from his 1995 debut album I Wish.
- In 1996, Rapper Da Brat sampled the track for "Ghetto Love" on her second album Anuthatantrum.
- In 1996, Tha Mexakinz sampled the track for "Problems" on their second album Tha Mexakinz.
- Tionne Watkins (a.k.a. T-Boz) of TLC sung an interpolation of the first verse of the "Debarge" track as the opening and the same chorus.
- In 2000, Master P sampled the beat for the song "Life I Live" featuring Short Circuit & Slay Sean off his album Ghetto Postage.
- In 2001, AZ (rapper) sampled the track for his song called "Problems" off his album 9 Lives.
- In 2004, Angie Stone sang an interpolation of the outro as the chorus to her song "I Wanna Thank Ya" from her album Stone Love.

== Charts ==
=== Weekly charts ===
Chart (1983)	Peak position
US Billboard Hot 100	17
US Adult Contemporary (Billboard)	1
US Hot R&B/Hip-Hop Songs (Billboard)	5
Canada Adult Contemporary (RPM)	2

=== Year-end charts ===
Chart (1983)	Position
US Billboard Hot 100	78
US Adult Contemporary (Billboard)	7
US Hot R&B/Hip-Hop Songs (Billboard)	33

== See also ==
- List of number-one adult contemporary singles of 1983 (U.S.)
