= Love Me in a Special Way =

"Love Me In a Special Way"

Single by DeBarge

from the album In a Special Way
- Released: November 20, 1983
- Genre: Soul
- Length: 4:13
- Label: Gordy
- Songwriter: El DeBarge
- Producer: El DeBarge

DeBarge singles chronology
"Time Will Reveal" (1983)	"Love Me In a Special Way" (1983)	"Rhythm of the Night" (1985)

"Love Me In a Special Way" is a single by DeBarge, released on November 20, 1983. It was the second and final single from their third studio album, In a Special Way on the Gordy label.

== Overview ==
The song was written, composed, arranged and produced by lead singer, El DeBarge, who mixed his modal tenor vocals with his high falsetto notes. The song includes a melodica solo by Stevie Wonder, a fellow Motown recording artist.

The single reached number 45 on the Billboard Hot 100 and number 11 on the R&B singles chart and increased the group's fan base as the group emerged as superstars that year. The single would later be covered by IMx, Tamia, and Kim Burrell, and would be sampled by rapper AZ on a similarly titled single, which featured sampled recordings of El's chorus line from the song. The song was sampled in 1995 by the RZA on "Cold World," off the GZA's highly acclaimed first solo album Liquid Swords. In 2002, Ashanti sampled it for her song, "Dreams", on her self-titled debut album.

== Charts ==
Chart (1984)	Peak position
U.S. Billboard Hot 100	45
U.S. Billboard Hot Black Singles	11

== Personnel ==
- Lead vocals and piano/keyboards: El DeBarge
- Background vocals by DeBarge
- Guest instrumentation/harmonica solo: Stevie Wonder
- Bass: Nathan East
- Drums: Harvey Mason
- Guitars: Paul Jackson, Jr., Charles Fearing
- String Arrangement: Clare Fischer
- Written/Produced by: El DeBarge
- Association Producer: Bobby DeBarge
- Rhythm Arrangement: El DeBarge, Benjamin F. Wright
- Engineer: Barney Perkins
- Assistant Engineers: Steve Bates, Chris Bellman, Walter Borchers
