= El DeBarge =

American singer (born 1961)

- Also known as: El DeBarge
- Born: Eldra Patrick DeBarge; June 4, 1961 (age 65); Detroit, Michigan, U.S.
- Origin: Grand Rapids, Michigan, U.S.
- Genres: R&B; soul; pop; gospel; jazz; hip hop
- Occupations: Singer; songwriter; musician
- Instruments: Vocals; keyboards
- Years active: 1979–present
- Labels: Motown; Warner Bros.; Geffen; Interscope
- Formerly of: DeBarge

Eldra "El" Patrick DeBarge (born June 4, 1961) is an American singer, songwriter and musician. He was the focal point and primary lead singer of the family group DeBarge. Popular songs led by El DeBarge include "Time Will Reveal", "Who's Holding Donna Now", "Stay with Me", "All This Love", and "Rhythm of the Night". As a solo artist, he is best known for his unique high tenor register, strong falsetto and hits like "Who's Johnny" and "Love Always". He has also collaborated with artists such as Dionne Warwick, Al Green, Lalah Hathaway, Tone Loc, Babyface, Faith Evans, Quincy Jones, Fourplay, and DJ Quik.

DeBarge is a five-time Grammy Award nominee. Eldra remains the only member of the DeBarges to have Grammy nominations both outside of the group and in the family. In 2023, Rolling Stone included Eldra on its list of the 200 Greatest Singers of All Time. It described his voice as "lean and elastic, zooming into falsetto with apparent breath-taking ease. The ribbons of notes he lets loose during the finish of the group's 'All This Love' are like caramel; nearly three decades later, he sang the solo 'Second Chance' with such lithe grace that when his voice broke a little at the end, it took the listener with it."

== Early life ==
A native of Detroit, Michigan, Eldra was the sixth of the children born to Robert Louis DeBarge Sr. (July 9, 1932 – August 30, 2009) and Etterlene DeBarge née Abney (October 13, 1935 – February 16, 2024). According to Etterlene, Robert was "insanely jealous" and "an extremely abusive father." His parents divorced when DeBarge was 13. DeBarge sang in his local church choir and played piano as a child. Later, after his family moved to Grand Rapids, Michigan, he and the rest of his family began performing at their uncle's Pentecostal church. DeBarge is of African-American and White American descent.

Growing up, he was closest to his eldest brother Bobby and began imitating his brother's vocal styling. For several years, DeBarge spent time in private study with music educator Ricky Callier. By 1975, he had begun to express a desire to become a performer. He became a father for the first time at 16 and eventually fathered eleven more children. In 1977, he dropped out of high school and began performing with his elder brothers in clubs and venues in Michigan.

In 1979, Bernd Lichters was able to secure a deal with Source Records/MCA to release the Pall Mall Groove – Hot Ice album as SMASH for the USA/Canada market and moved Eldra from Michigan to Los Angeles, to have him, his brothers Mark and Randy DeBarge, in addition to their cousin Andre Abney, Elliot Townsend, and Stanley Hood, to back up the release as the SMASH band. His eldest sister Bunny joined her brothers in California. In 1980, because of the success of their brothers Bobby and Tommy DeBarge with the hit group Switch, Eldra was able to perform live at the piano and sing in front of Motown CEO Berry Gordy, who immediately signed the group, then known as The DeBarges, to the label.

Motown mentored them, and members later worked with and contributed songwriting, arrangements, and production to the recordings of Switch, among them the 1980 albums This Is My Dream and Reaching for Tomorrow. Eldra's first professional recording was as background vocalist to Switch's 1979 hit "I Call Your Name". He later helped to arrange music for several Switch songs including "Love Over and Over Again" and "My Friend in the Sky", which he, Bunny, and Bobby wrote. This song would later be sampled by the likes of Queen Pen and Raheem DeVaughn.

== Career ==
In 1981, The DeBarges was released after the family had worked in the studio for a year recording it. The album was noted for most of its songs produced and written by all four family members including Bobby DeBarge, who helped end the album track "Queen of My Heart" after DeBarge had led the song for most of its tenure. The following album, 1982's All This Love, featured younger brother James and saw much success with the compositions "I Like It" and the title track. Eldra would remain the producer and arranger for all of the group's Motown albums.

In 1983, DeBarge released In a Special Way, which spawned the hits "Time Will Reveal" and "Love Me in a Special Way", and in 1984, the band became a sensation while touring for Luther Vandross on the singer's Busy Body tour. Though the group enjoyed much success and appeared to be a family unit, there were growing tensions between Eldra and his brothers, mainly because of Motown's push to have him to become the only noted star of the group, repeating a pattern that began with Smokey Robinson and The Miracles. By the end of the tour, Eldra was mainly called to handle the production of DeBarge's next album, Rhythm of the Night, without much help from his siblings. The DeBarge family had one more album, Bad Boys, although Eldra and Bunny were not on the album.

Rhythm of the Night became the group's best-selling album ever, although some contended that Eldra was the only member present on the album with the exception of the title track, which became a top five hit in several countries including the US and UK becoming the group's signature song. In late 1985, he appeared on The Facts of Life in the Season 7 episode "Doo-Wah" as himself and performed his single "You Wear it Well" with Lisa Whelchel, Kim Fields, Mindy Cohn, and Nancy McKeon singing backup. In 1986, Eldra left the group and began his solo career with the release of his self-titled debut album, which spawned the hits "Who's Johnny" and "Love Always". Three years passed, however, until DeBarge released his second album, Gemini in 1989. The album had two hits, "Real Love" and "Somebody Loves You". DeBarge's contract with Motown was terminated in 1990, and he signed with Warner Bros. In the meantime, DeBarge was featured on the Quincy Jones single "The Secret Garden", alongside Al B. Sure!, James Ingram, and Barry White, released in 1990.

In 1992, DeBarge released his third album, the Maurice White-produced In the Storm, which featured the Chanté Moore duet "You Know What I Like", which was Moore's first professional recording. Critics noted the album for its Marvin Gaye-styled productions. Eldra later admitted that Gaye was a huge influence on his musical style and once commented that he had initially written "All This Love" as a song he imagined Gaye doing; he even imitated Gaye's ad-libs during his I Want You era near the end. That same year, Eldra had chart success on the R&B charts with a collaboration with Fourplay on their version of Gaye's "After the Dance". DeBarge's next album, 1994's Heart, Mind and Soul, co-produced with Babyface, yielded modest charted singles such as "Slide" and "Where is My Love" which featured Babyface on duet vocals.

While DeBarge continued to collaborate on other artists' projects, including those of his brother Chico and rapper DJ Quik with whom El collaborated on Quik's hit "Hand in Hand", he did not release any more albums between 1994 and 2009. In 2010, he finally emerged from a 16-year hiatus with the appropriately titled Second Chance, released after a series of comeback performances and appearances, including a well received performance at the 2010 BET Awards. The album yielded two singles, "Second Chance" and the Faith Evans duet "Lay With You", and later resulted in three Grammy Award nominations: Best Male R&B Vocal Performance, Best R&B Song and Best R&B Album. On February 4, 2022, DeBarge performed a Tiny Desk Concert for NPR Music at his home, playing keyboards and singing. The concert was part of a celebration of Black History Month.

== Personal life ==
DeBarge served 13 months of his two-year prison sentence in 2008 for drug-related convictions. In February 2011, while promoting his 2010 album Second Chance, DeBarge's label announced that the singer was canceling all public dates and appearances as he went back to rehab following a relapse. He has 12 children by different women.

== Discography ==
Solo albums

- El DeBarge (1986)
- Gemini (1989)
- In the Storm (1992)
- Heart, Mind and Soul (1994)
- Second Chance (2010)

with DeBarge

- The DeBarges (1981)
- All This Love (1982)
- In a Special Way (1983)
- Rhythm of the Night (1985)

== See also ==
- List of number-one dance hits (United States)
- List of artists who reached number one on the US Dance chart
