= Rhythm of the Night (song) =

1985 single by DeBarge

Single by DeBarge

from the album Rhythm of the Night
- B-side: "Queen of My Heart"
- Released: February 23, 1985
- Genre: Dance-pop
- Length: 3:54
- Label: Gordy
- Songwriter: Diane Warren
- Producer: Richard Perry

DeBarge singles chronology
"Love Me in a Special Way" (1983)	"Rhythm of the Night" (1985)	"Who's Holding Donna Now" (1985)

Music video
- "Rhythm of the Night" on YouTube

"Rhythm of the Night" is a song by American musical recording group DeBarge, written by Diane Warren and released on February 23, 1985, on the Gordy label as the first single from their fourth studio album of the same title. The song was Warren's breakthrough as a songwriter and was the group's biggest hit, peaking at number three on the US Billboard Hot 100.

== Overview ==
=== History ===
By 1985, DeBarge had become pop/R&B sensations, with ballads mostly making up the repertoire of their hit catalog, though they were as impressive as live performers, with a mixture of their trademark soft ballads and a collection of dance material. Motown Records sought to produce DeBarge with a dance single, hoping to give them a bigger crossover success, mirroring label-mate Lionel Richie, who like DeBarge, had created his initial fan base on soft songs before the release of "All Night Long", which included a catchy dance beat influenced by calypso. A similar influence would come in the production of "Rhythm of the Night", which featured more of El DeBarge's modal tenor voice with flashes of his trademark falsetto. Richard Perry, the hit producer behind hit recordings for the Pointer Sisters, Harry Nilsson, and Carly Simon, among others, produced the song; the lyrics were written by one of the label's newly hired songwriters, Diane Warren.

=== Reception ===
The release of "Rhythm of the Night" coincided with the release of the Motown film The Last Dragon, which featured the song as part of its soundtrack. The free publicity from the song's association with the movie helped boost its popularity. Eventually released as a single, the song produced DeBarge's biggest success yet, with the single reaching number three on the US Billboard Hot 100, number one on the Billboard Hot Black Singles chart, number one on the Billboard Adult Contemporary chart, and number four on the UK Singles Chart, becoming their only major hit single in the UK. The song was certified gold by the Recording Industry Association of America (RIAA) and boosted similar success for its parent album of the same name. The music video gained the group heavy rotation on MTV and BET and was actually the group's first (and last) real music video, starting a brief period where DeBarge became pop superstars. The song featured in the 2016 film Ghostbusters: Answer the Call and a cover version appeared in the jukebox musical Moulin Rouge!. The song also features in the twelfth season of RuPaul's Drag Race as a running gag, due to contestant Crystal Methyd's out-of-drag resemblance to El DeBarge. Lyrics and sample from the chorus of "Rhythm of the Night" were adopted in CNCO's song "Pretend".

== Personnel ==
Musicians

- El DeBarge – lead vocals
- DeBarge – backing vocals, spoken monologues
- Jeff Lorber – Yamaha DX7
- Steve Mitchell – additional synthesizers
- Howie Rice – additional synthesizers
- Dann Huff – guitars
- Paul Jackson Jr. – guitars
- Abraham Laboriel – bass
- John Robinson – Oberheim DMX
- Paulinho da Costa – percussion

Production

- Richard Perry – producer
- Bradford Rosenberger – production coordinator
- Don Smith – rhythm track recording, vocal track recording
- Michael Brooks – overdub engineer
- Barney Perkins – remixing
- Glen Holguin – assistant engineer
- Alex Schmoll – assistant engineer
- Jim Scott – assistant engineer
- Diane Warren – songwriter

== Charts ==
=== Weekly charts ===
Weekly chart performance for "Rhythm of the Night"
Chart (1985–1986)	Peak position
Australia (Kent Music Report)	5
Belgium (Ultratop 50 Flanders)	7
Canada Top Singles (RPM)	3
Canada Adult Contemporary (RPM)	1
Europe (European Hot 100 Singles)	7
Finland (Suomen virallinen lista)	29
France (SNEP)	50
Ireland (IRMA)	5
Italy (Musica e dischi)	25
Netherlands (Dutch Top 40)	4
Netherlands (Single Top 100)	11
New Zealand (Recorded Music NZ)	3
South Africa (Springbok)	5
Switzerland (Schweizer Hitparade)	24
UK Singles (Official Charts)	4
US Billboard Hot 100	3
US Adult Contemporary (Billboard)	1
US Hot Black Singles (Billboard)	1
West Germany (GfK)	19

=== Year-end charts ===
Year-end chart performance for "Rhythm of the Night"
Chart (1985)	Position
Australia (Kent Music Report)	44
Belgium (Ultratop)	55
Canada Top Singles (RPM)	28
Netherlands (Dutch Top 40)	42
Netherlands (Single Top 100)	74
New Zealand (RIANZ)	28
UK Singles (OCC)	63
US Billboard Hot 100	32
US Adult Contemporary (Billboard)	13
US Hot Black Singles (Billboard)	18

== Certifications ==
Certifications for "Rhythm of the Night"
Region	Certification	Certified units/sales
Canada (Music Canada)	Gold	50,000^{^}
New Zealand (RMNZ)	Gold	15,000^{‡}
United Kingdom (BPI)	Silver	200,000^{‡}
^{^} Shipments figures based on certification alone.^{‡} Sales+streaming figures based on certification alone.

== See also ==
- List of number-one R&B singles of 1985 (U.S.)
- List of number-one adult contemporary singles of 1985 (U.S.)
