= DeBarge =

American R&B, soul and funk musical group

- DeBarge in 1983. (From L-R): Mark, James, El, Bunny, and Randy.

Background information
- Also known as: The DeBarges; The DeBarge Family
- Origin: Grand Rapids, Michigan, U.S.
- Genres: R&B; soul; funk; pop
- Years active: 1979–1989
- Labels: Gordy; Striped Horse; RT Bis; Truth Ministries
- Past members: El DeBarge; Bunny DeBarge; Mark DeBarge; Randy DeBarge; James DeBarge; Bobby DeBarge

DeBarge was an American musical recording group composed of several members of the DeBarge family. In addition to various solo projects completed by members of the family, DeBarge was active between 1979 and 1989. The group originally consisted of El, Mark, Randy, and Bunny. James joined the group a year later for their 1982 second album. Bobby joined in 1987, following the departures of Bunny and El.

DeBarge released six studio albums, four of them with Motown subsidiary Gordy Records. These albums included The DeBarges (1981), All This Love (1982), In a Special Way (1983), and Rhythm of the Night (1985). The latter became the group's best-selling album and contained the single "Rhythm of the Night", which hit No. 3 on the US Billboard Hot 100, making it their highest-charting single in America. In the mid-1980s, El and Bunny went solo and DeBarge was subsequently released from its contract.

The remaining members, Mark, Randy and James, now augmented by their eldest brother, Bobby, signed with Stripe Horse Records, an independent label, in 1987, which released their final studio album, Bad Boys. The group continued to perform for an additional two years. Bobby, along with younger sibling, Chico, were arrested for drug trafficking in 1989. Legal issues and personal problems, compounded with the changing musical tastes of the public, led to the group's dispersion in 1989, ten years after its inception.

== History ==
=== Family background ===
The DeBarge family are the children of Etterlene DeBarge (née Abney; 1935–2024), an African American and American Indian gospel singer born in Royal Oak, Michigan in 1935 and Robert Louis DeBarge, Sr. (1932–2009), a White American soldier of French and English descent born in Cicero, Illinois. They married when Etterlene was 17, a year after the death of her father James Abney, a church choir leader and peanut retailer. They separated in the mid-1970s and divorced in 1974. Etterlene remembers Robert DeBarge, Sr. as physically and emotionally abusive to her and the children, and said he used her youth, the absence of her father, and continuous pregnancy to control her. DeBarge, Sr. has been characterized as "domineering and physically abusive to his wife," and some of the DeBarge children have accused him of having sexually abused them. Bunny DeBarge, the eldest, recalls being sexually abused by him between the ages of seven and 13.

The group hailed from the East Side of Detroit, where the siblings were born and raised; they later relocated to Grand Rapids, Michigan. Members included sister Etterlene ("Bunny") and brothers Mark ("Marty"), William ("Randy"), Eldra ("El"), and James. Younger siblings Jonathan ("Chico"), Darrell ("Young"), and Carol ("Peaches") DeBarge are also singers though not with the group.

=== Early years of the group and Switch ===
The siblings who became DeBarge started performing in various groups together in the Detroit, Michigan area in the mid-1970s. In 1979, brothers Randy, Mark, and El were part of the SMASH band, which was a release on Source Records/MCA in the USA/Canada before it was released as Pall Mall Groove Hot Ice in Germany by Polydor. Bernd Lichters, who rented a home in Cerritos, California, bought them instruments, and they were mentored by members of the Motown group Switch, including their elder brothers Tommy and Bobby and co-founding member and family friend Gregory Williams. Bunny DeBarge had joined her younger brothers in 1979 as well, and they formed as The DeBarges in 1980. That year, because of Bobby's success with Switch, younger brother El was able to perform live on the piano and sing for Motown CEO and founder Berry Gordy, who was impressed by the group and agreed to sign them that year. For a year the group worked alongside members of Switch, helping to add background vocals, instrumentation, arranging, and musical and lyrical composition to the band's works, most prominently in "I Call Your Name", "My Friend in the Sky", and "Love Over and Over Again".

By 1981, Bobby and Tommy had left Switch and returned the favor to their siblings working with them on their debut album, which was released that year with Bobby, Bunny, and El as main producers. The only single, the Bobby-led ballad "What's Your Name", failed to chart.

=== Success ===
In 1982, they added their brother James to the lineup and worked on their second album, All This Love, produced by El and Iris Gordy. The album launched them into R&B stardom with the recordings "I Like It" and "All This Love". Both songs also became crossover pop hits with "All This Love" later going to number one on Billboard's adult contemporary chart. In 1983, the group made an impression after appearing on Motown 25, where they performed alongside High Inergy. Later in 1983, the group issued their third album, In a Special Way, which spawned two further hit singles, "Time Will Reveal" and "Love Me in a Special Way"."Be My Lady" the first track opens the album as a late 1983 Dance hit.

Like All This Love before it, the album reached gold status in the United States.

Following that album's success, DeBarge was handpicked by Luther Vandross to open for him on his "Busy Body Tour" to support his album of the same name. In 1984, James DeBarge made headlines when he secretly eloped with 18-year-old Janet Jackson of the famed Jackson family, but their marriage was quickly annulled the following year. Janet would later recount how, following their wedding, she was left alone in a hotel for three hours not knowing the whereabouts of her new husband. These absences, the result of James' prolific drug use, became common occurrences throughout their brief marriage.

When the tour ended in late 1984, the group recorded the Diane Warren composition, "Rhythm of the Night", for the soundtrack to the Motown-produced film, Berry Gordy's The Last Dragon from 1985. The song was released in early 1985 and became a hit single, eventually reaching the top five in several countries, mainly in the US and UK, becoming the band's biggest-selling and their best-known hit.

=== Siblings leave and the end of the group ===
Sensing that El DeBarge was emerging as the "star" of the group, Motown had El working on the group's next album primarily by himself, with the label failing to call on the other siblings' help. It's believed Motown was fearful of the other members' growing dependencies to drug addiction, only trusting El as he seemed to be the most reliable.

The Rhythm of the Night album became the band's best-selling work, going platinum and featuring further hits such as "Who's Holding Donna Now" and "You Wear It Well". Following the end of its successful promotion, however, both El and Bunny departed from the group after Motown offered them lucrative solo deals. Without the powerful harmonies of the brother and sister duo, the rest of the DeBarges were not considered commercial enough to keep going, and they were dropped from the Motown label in 1986.

In 1987, Bobby joined the group, and failing to find deals with major labels, the group (still known as DeBarge) signed with the independent label Striped Horse Records, later releasing what turned out to be their final studio album, Bad Boys. Since Striped Horse had financial problems promoting the album and without the help of Motown, and although two singles were released – "Dance All Night", which peaked at number 33, and the ballad "I Got You Babe", which only reached number 73 – the album itself failed to chart.

DeBarge continued their career in 1988, even bringing along younger brother Chico (who had a successful hit "Talk to Me") with them as their opening act. The brothers made a guest appearance on the television show Punky Brewster in 1988.

Later in 1988, Bobby and Chico were arrested for drug trafficking in Grand Rapids. They were eventually convicted of the charges and sentenced to two different prisons to serve their sentences. The arrests and subsequent convictions brought an end to the group as a musical entity and it was disbanded in 1989.

By the time of its disbanding, the group had released nine top 40 R&B singles, five top 40 pop singles, two Pop top 10 hits, five top 10 R&B singles, two number-one R&B singles, one number-one single on the dance chart, and three number-one hits on the adult contemporary chart. In 2008, Bunny DeBarge wrote a book about her famous family titled The Kept Ones. The narrative charted the siblings' success from their humble roots in Grand Rapids, Michigan, detailing the highs and lows along their journey. A second book with the same title was published in 2020, causing issues within the family. El DeBarge was most vocal, posting on social media that the books written by Bunny were works of fiction "filled with lies".

=== Setbacks, solo projects, and some success ===
Despite the group's highly publicized drug addictions and several members serving jail time for drug offenses, the siblings have continued to perform together occasionally.

In 1991, Randy and James contributed to a gospel album featuring their mother Etterlene and younger siblings Darryl (Young DeBarge) and Carol (Peaches DeBarge), billed as "the DeBarge Family." Several members of the family made several solo albums during the 1990s and 2000s, but never reached the fame and popularity of their original group.

The DeBarges' story of their rise and fall was documented in late 2008 as the debut episode of the TV One show Unsung.

In 2010 El, after a six-year sabbatical of releasing solo albums, and following a period of drug addiction and several arrests, released the well-received Grammy-nominated album, Second Chance and went on tour in support of R&B singer Mary J. Blige in 2011, but relapsed and went back to drug rehab to address his continuing issues.

In 2011, James, Randy and Bunny appeared on Dr. Drew's Lifechangers to discuss their troubles with drug addiction, later agreeing to attend a rehabilitation facility. While Randy and James left the facility on a follow-up episode, Bunny still attended and told Dr. Drew of her recovery, even performing a gospel song on the show.

Drug abuse has also brought various tragedies and setbacks over the years: Bobby DeBarge died at a hospice in Grand Rapids after contracting AIDS, following years of heroin addiction; Tommy DeBarge, who also suffered from drug addiction, was on kidney dialysis but sometimes performed with surviving members of Switch and with his family up to his death in 2021 from kidney failure; Randy DeBarge and Mark DeBarge are said to have "incurable diseases", according to their mother. James was sentenced to prison for drug offenses.

=== Musical legacy ===
The group's musical genre covers soul, boogie, and R&B, drawing inspiration from the family's initial roots in Detroit. The group's material has been either frequently sampled or covered:

- Their collaborations with Switch on their recordings, "I Call Your Name" and "My Friend in the Sky" have been sampled as well as their own material, including "I Like It", "Stay with Me" and "A Dream".
- Rapper The Notorious B.I.G.'s remix of "One More Chance", which sampled "Stay With Me".
- Mary J. Blige, a fan of DeBarge, also sampled and covered their work, including "Share My World" (adding the group's intro ad-libs from that song on her song of the same name), "A Dream" and "Don't Go" (which interpolated the ending of "Stay With Me").
- Rapper Tupac Shakur interpolated the melody of "A Dream" for his posthumous hit, "I Ain't Mad at Cha".
- R&B group Blackstreet sampled the music of "A Dream" for their hit, "Don't Leave Me", and have said they were big fans of DeBarge (Teddy Riley calling El DeBarge "a living legend" in the liner notes of their 1994 debut album) and had covered "I Like It". On their platinum album Another Level the group did a gospel version of DeBarge's hit "Time Will Reveal". In 1998, Riley also sampled parts of Switch's "My Friend in the Sky" (co-composed by Bobby, Bunny and El) for rapper Queen Pen's album track, "No Hooks" off her My Melody album. (The same song would be sampled in 2005 for Raheem DeVaughn's title track off The Love Experience.)
- The melody of "Stay With Me" was revisited by Ashanti on her single, "Foolish" and later by Mariah Carey on her single "I'll Be Lovin' U Long Time" from E=MC².
- In 2007, rapper Rich Boy's hit "Throw Some D's" sampled Switch's "I Call Your Name", which was co-written by Bobby and arranged by Bobby and El.
- "I Like It" is their most sampled, with several acts sampling the music or interpolating the song's popular bridge (sung by El and written by Bunny), and "All This Love" has also been covered and sampled frequently by other artists.

=== Accolades and achievements ===
- In 1984, In A Special Way was nominated for Best R&B Performance By A Duo Or Group With Vocal in the 26th Annual GRAMMY Awards.

== Personnel ==
- Etterlene "Bunny" DeBarge – vocals (1979–1986)
- Eldra "El" DeBarge – vocals, piano/keyboards (1979–1986)
- Mark "Marty" DeBarge – vocals, drums, percussion, trumpet, saxophone (1979–1989)
- William "Randy" DeBarge – vocals, bass guitar (1979–1989)
- James DeBarge – vocals, piano/keyboards (1982–1989)
- Robert "Bobby" DeBarge Jr. – vocals, piano/keyboards, drums (1987–1989)
- Jonathan "Chico" DeBarge – vocals, piano/keyboards (1988–1989)

== Discography ==
- The DeBarges (1981)
- All This Love (1982)
- In a Special Way (1983)
- Rhythm of the Night (1985)
- Bad Boys (1987)

== See also ==
- List of artists who reached number one on the US Dance chart
- Kristinia DeBarge
