= 57th David di Donatello =

2012 Italian film awards

- Date: 4 May 2012
- Site: Auditorium Conciliazione, Rome, Italy
- Hosted by: Tullio Solenghi

Highlights
- Best Picture: Caesar Must Die
- Most awards: Caesar Must Die (5)
- Most nominations: Piazza Fontana: The Italian Conspiracy (16)

The 57th David di Donatello ceremony, presented by the Accademia del Cinema Italiano, was held on 4 May 2012.

== Winners and nominees ==
Best Film: Caesar Must Die – directed by Paolo and Vittorio Taviani; We Have a Pope – directed by Nanni Moretti; Piazza Fontana: The Italian Conspiracy – directed by Marco Tullio Giordana; Terraferma – directed by Emanuele Crialese; This Must Be the Place – directed by Paolo Sorrentino	Best Producer: Grazia Volpi – Caesar Must Die; Nanni Moretti, Domenico Procacci – We Have a Pope; Francesco Bonsembiante – Shun Li and the Poet; Riccardo Tozzi, Giovanni Stabilini, Marco Chimenz – Piazza Fontana: The Italian Conspiracy; Nicola Giuliano, Andrea Occhipinti, Francesca Cima – This Must Be the Place
Best Director: Paolo and Vittorio Taviani – Caesar Must Die; Nanni Moretti – We Have a Pope; Ferzan Özpetek – Magnificent Presence; Marco Tullio Giordana – Piazza Fontana: The Italian Conspiracy; Emanuele Crialese – Terraferma; Paolo Sorrentino – This Must Be the Place	Best New Director: Francesco Bruni – Easy!; Stefano Sollima – ACAB – All Cops Are Bastards; Alice Rohrwacher – Heavenly Body; Andrea Segre – Shun Li and the Poet; Guido Lombardi – Là-bas: A Criminal Education
Best Actor: Michel Piccoli – We Have a Pope; Fabrizio Bentivoglio – Easy!; Elio Germano – Magnificent Presence; Marco Giallini – A Flat for Three; Valerio Mastandrea – Piazza Fontana: The Italian Conspiracy	Best Actress: Zhao Tao – Shun Li and the Poet; Valeria Golino – Kryptonite!; Claudia Gerini – Il mio domani; Micaela Ramazzotti – A Flat for Three; Donatella Finocchiaro – Terraferma
Best Supporting Actor: Pierfrancesco Favino – Piazza Fontana: The Italian Conspiracy; Giuseppe Battiston – Shun Li and the Poet; Marco Giallini – ACAB - All Cops Are Bastards; Fabrizio Gifuni – Piazza Fontana: The Italian Conspiracy; Renato Scarpa – We Have a Pope	Best Supporting Actress: Michela Cescon – Piazza Fontana: The Italian Conspiracy; Barbora Bobuľová – Easy!; Anita Caprioli – Heavenly Body; Cristiana Capotondi – Kryptonite!; Margherita Buy – We Have a Pope
David di Donatello for Best Screenplay: Paolo Sorrentino, Umberto Contarello – This Must Be the Place; Paolo and Vittorio Taviani, Fabio Cavalli – Caesar Must Die; Nanni Moretti, Francesco Piccolo, Federica Pontremoli – We Have a Pope; Marco Tullio Giordana, Sandro Petraglia, Stefano Rulli – Piazza Fontana: The Italian Conspiracy; Francesco Bruni – Easy!	Best Cinematography: Luca Bigazzi – This Must Be the Place; Paolo Carnera – ACAB – All Cops Are Bastards; Simone Zampagni – Caesar Must Die; Alessandro Pesci – We Have a Pope; Roberto Forza – Piazza Fontana: The Italian Conspiracy
Best Production Design: Paola Bizzarri – We Have a Pope; Francesco Frigeri – The Entrepreneur; Andrea Crisanti – Magnificent Presence; Giancarlo Basili – Piazza Fontana: The Italian Conspiracy; Stefania Cella – This Must Be the Place	Best Score: David Byrne – This Must Be the Place; Umberto Scipione – Benvenuti al Nord; Giuliano Taviani, Carmelo Travia – Caesar Must Die; Franco Piersanti – We Have a Pope; Pasquale Catalano – Magnificent Presence
Best Original Song: "If It Falls, It Falls" from This Must Be the Place – Composed by David Byrne (music) and Will Oldham (lyrics), performed by Michael Brunnock –; "Sometimes" from Benvenuti al Nord – Composed by Umberto Scipione and Alessia Scipione, performed by Alessia Scipione –; "Gitmem daha" from Magnificent Presence Sezen Aksu, Pasquale Catalano and Yildirim Turker, performed by Sezen Aksu; "Therese" from A Flat for Three – Composed by Gaetano Curreri, Andrea Fornili and Angelica Caronia, performed by Angelica Ponti; "Scialla!" from Easy! – Composed and performed by Amir Issaa	Best Editing: Roberto Perpignani – Caesar Must Die; Patrizio Marone – ACAB – All Cops Are Bastards; Esmeralda Calabria – We Have a Pope; Francesca Calvelli – Piazza Fontana: The Italian Conspiracy; Cristiano Travaglioli – This Must Be the Place
Best Sound: Benito Alchimede, Brando Mosca – Caesar Must Die; Gilberto Martinelli – ACAB – All Cops Are Bastards; Alessandro Zanon – We Have a Pope; Fulgenzio Ceccon – Piazza Fontana: The Italian Conspiracy; Ray Cross, William Sarokin – This Must Be the Place	Best Costumes: Lina Nerli Taviani – We Have a Pope; Rossano Marchi – Kryptonite!; Alessandro Lai – Magnificent Presence; Francesca Livia Sartori – Piazza Fontana: The Italian Conspiracy; Karen Patch – This Must Be the Place
Best Special Visual Effects: Stefano Marinoni, Paola Trisoglio for Visualogie – Piazza Fontana: The Italian Conspiracy; Palantir Digital Media – The Arrival of Wang; Mario Zanot for Storyteller – We Have a Pope; Stefano Marinoni and Paola Trisoglio for Visualogie, Rodolfo Migliari for Chromatica – This Must Be the Place; Rainbow CGI – The Last Man on Earth	Best Make-up Artist: Luisa Abel – This Must Be the Place; Manlio Rocchetti – ACAB – All Cops Are Bastards; Maurizio Fazzini – Kryptonite!; Ermanno Spera – Magnificent Presence; Enrico Iacoponi – Piazza Fontana: The Italian Conspiracy
Best Hairstylist: Kim Santantonio – This Must Be the Place; Carlo Barucci – We Have a Pope; Mauro Tamagnini – Kryptonite!; Francesca De Simone – Magnificent Presence; Ferdinando Merolla – Piazza Fontana: The Italian Conspiracy	Best Documentary Feature: Tahrir Liberation Square – directed by Stefano Savona; The Castle – directed by Massimo D'Anolfi and Martina Parenti; Lasciando la baia del re – directed by Claudia Cipriani; Pasta nera – directed by Alessandro Piva; Polvere – Il grande processo dell'amianto – directed by Niccolò Bruna and Andrea Prandstraller; Zavorra – directed by Vincenzo Mineo
Best Short Film: Dell'ammazzare il maiale – directed by Simone Massi; Ce l'hai un minuto? – directed by Alessandro Bardani and Luca Di Prospero; Cusutu n' coddu – directed by Giovanni La Pàrola; L'estate che non viene – directed by Pasquale Marino; Tiger Boy – directed by Gabriele Mainetti	Best European Film: The Intouchables – directed by Éric Toledano and Olivier Nakache; Carnage – directed by Roman Polański; Melancholia – directed by Lars von Trier; Le Havre – directed by Aki Kaurismäki; The Artist – directed by Michel Hazanavicius
Best Foreign Film: A Separation – directed by Asghar Farhadi; Drive – directed by Nicolas Winding Refn; Hugo (Hugo) – directed by Martin Scorsese; The Ides of March – directed by George Clooney; The Tree of Life – directed by Terrence Malick	David Youth Award: Easy! – directed by Francesco Bruni
