= The Ceasars =

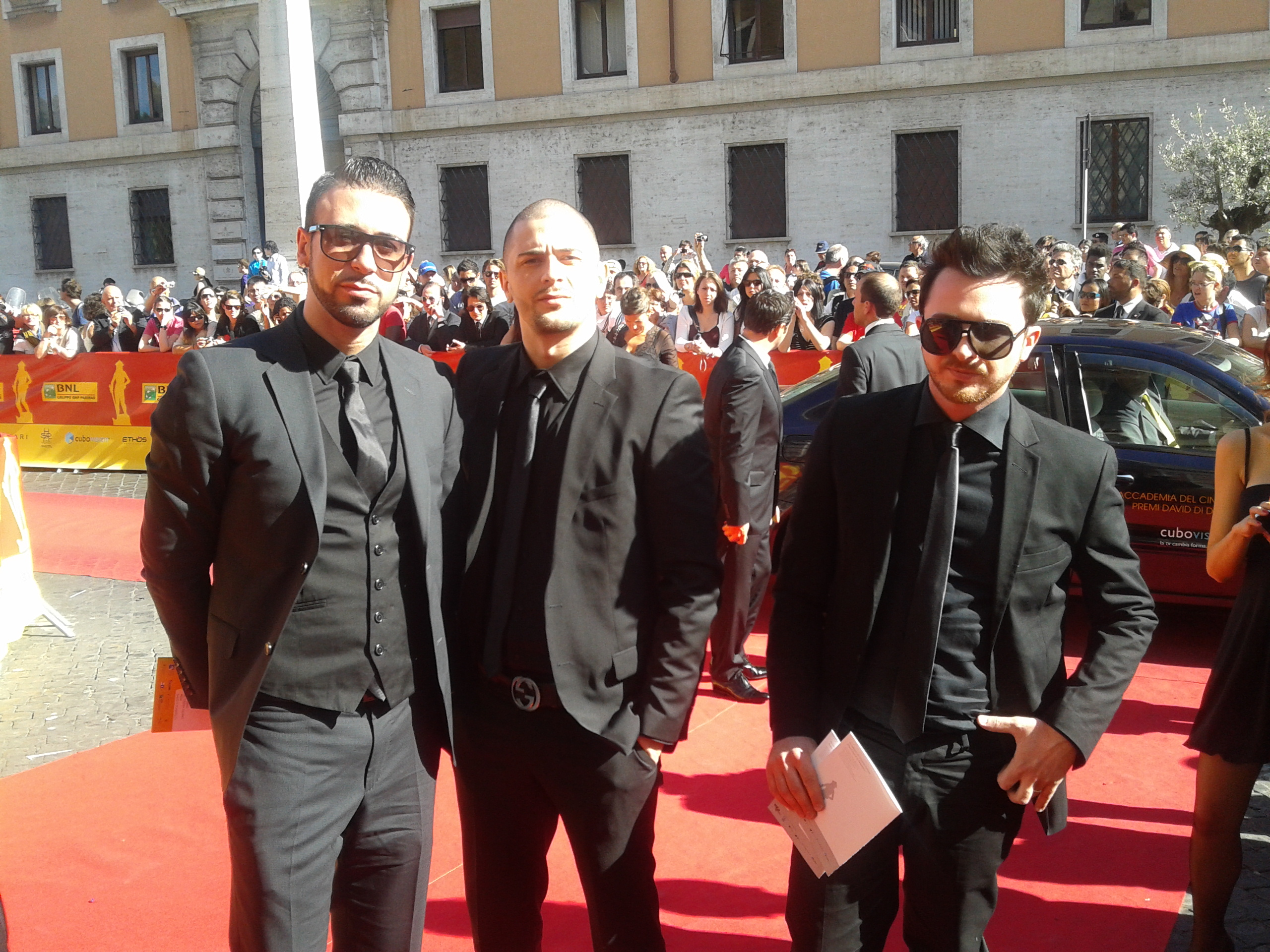
- The Ceasars on the red carpet of the David di Donatello Award Ceremony held in Rome on 5 May 2012

Background information
- Origin: Italy
- Genres: Hip hop, pop, R&B, rap rock
- Occupation(s): Producers, composers, arrangers, songwriters
- Years active: 2007–present

The Ceasars is a duo of Italian music producers, Paolo "Ceasar" Catoni and Marco "PStarr" Pistella.

== History ==
The trio was originally known (until 2012) as Ceasars Productions and their production is divided between Italy and the United States.

In the United States, they have cooperated with various hip hop artists such as Styles P, B.G. and Jadakiss, and R&B artists such as Avery Storm. In 2014, Avery Storm's EP Audiobiography, featuring Jadakiss, Styles P and N.O.R.E. was released.

In 2013, with "Red Line" they started a project with New York-based singer and songwriter Michael Brunnock (winner of the 2012 David di Donatello Award as performer of the soundtrack composed by David Byrne of Talking Heads for the film This Must Be the Place by Paolo Sorrentino).

In Italy, they have produced music for a variety of major artists including Baby K, Guè Pequeno, Gemitaiz, Ghemon and others.

In 2011, together with Italian rapper Amir, they composed the original soundtrack of Scialla!, the most awarded Italian film in 2011 directed by Francesco Bruni and shot in Rome. The twelve tracks were published by EMI Music Publishing Italy and the official videoclip of the film directed by Gianluca Catania won the 2012 Roma Videoclip Award. For this film, the Ceasars were also nominated for the 2012 David di Donatello and Nastro d'Argento (silver ribbons) and won the 2012 Premio Cinema Giovane for Best Original Soundtrack.

In 2014, together with Michael Brunnock, they created "Peaches and Cream", the title track of the film Noi 4 directed by Francesco Bruni.

In 2016, they produced the soundtrack of #Twerkumentary, a documentary about twerking directed by Diana Manfredi.

== Discography ==
=== U.S. productions ===
Year	Artist(s)	Title	Featuring
2007	Mickey Factz	"Not Goin' Back"	
2007	Mickey Factz	"Hit Me"	Skyzoo, Nina B
2007	Oun P	"Real Hip Hop"	
2009	B.G.	"Closer"	
2009	B.G.	"So 504"	Gar of Chopper City Boyz
2009	Oun P & Murda Mook	"G.O.D. (Good Old Days)"	
2009	Serius Jones	"Oh Baby"	
2009	Starsky	"I Am Legend"	
2010	Craig G	"Vapors 2010"	Nump Trump, Mike Marshall
2010	S.A.S.	"Selfish"	Corte Ellis
2010	S.A.S	"Flight Work"	Chiddy Bang, Mistah F.A.B.
2010	Shady Nate	"Flying with My Iron"	
2010	Starsky	"Hustler"	
2010	Styles P	"Road To Success"	
2010	Styles P	"It's Over"	
2011	Avery Storm	"Best Friends"	
2011	B.G.	"Closer"	
2011	Cormega	"Live And Learn (Remix)"	
2011	Darkangel	"Round & Round"	
2011	Grafh	"Heartbreak"	
2011	Grafh, Saigon, Mysonne, Styles P, Parlae of Dem Franchize Boyz, Kool G Rap, Red Café, Mistah F.A.B., Serius Jones, Avery Storm	"War Music"	
2011	Kool G Rap	"I Am"	
2011	Lil' Fame Of M.O.P.	"Get Down"	
2011	Mista Raja	"Hood"	
2011	Mistah F.A.B.	"California Dreamin'"	
2011	Mysonne	"Say Hi to the Devil"	Al-Doe, Skrilla Kid Villain
2011	Parlae of Dem Franchize Boyz	"Believin'"	
2011	S.A.S.	"Selfish"	Corte Ellis
2011	Red Café	"G's Over Here"	
2011	Saigon	"Married to the Game"	
2011	Serius Jones	"Victory Lap"	
2011	Smif-N-Wessun	"2 Minutes NY Banger"	
2011	Starsky	"Still Standing"	
2011	Styles P	"Where The Angels Sleep"	
2012	Styles P	"Where The Angels Sleep" ("Master of Ceremonies" edition)	
2013	Michael Brunnock	"Red Line"	
2014	Michael Brunnock	"Peaches and Cream"	
2014	Avery Storm	" Audiobiography" (EP): ”Easier to break up”; ”Cant walk away”; ”Done All I Can”; ”Head Over Heels”; ”Faith”; ”Counted Me Out”	Styles P, Jadakiss, N.O.R.E.

=== Italy productions ===
2008

- Amir – "Non Sono Un Immigrato"
- Amir – "Questa è Roma 2008"
- Amir – "Siamo Liberi" feat. Bassi Maestro

2009

- Amir – "Dimmi Di Si" feat. Daniele Vit
- Amir – "Requiem for a Gangsta" feat. Prince, Howie
- PStarr – "Solo A Te" feat. Tormento

2010

- Dirty Mo' – "Lights, Camera, Action" feat. Smif-N-Wessun

2011

- Joice – "Rivincita" feat. Luchè, Soul Poetry
- The Ceasars & Amir – Scialla! – original movie soundtrack published by EMI Publishing Italy
1. FRancesco Rigon – Le onde
2. Amir – La parte del figlio
3. Amir – Scialla
4. FRancesco Rigon – Mr. Slide
5. Amir – Questa è Roma
6. Ceasar & PStarr – Pool party
7. Ceasar Productions – Macchina gialla
8. Amir – La strada parla
9. Ceasar & PStarr – Discoteque
10. Ceasar & PStarr – Scialla variazioni sul tema
11. FRancesco Rigon – Il gatto e la pioggia
12. Amir – Le ali per volare

2012

- Amir – "Inossidabile Pt. 2"
- Ceasar – "Miura P400 (1968)"
- Ghemon – "PTS Pt. 2"
- Johnny Marsiglia – "Voci – Remix" feat. Louis Dee, Zuli

2013

- Baby K – "Tutto Ritorna" (produced by Michele Canova & The Ceasars)
- Michael Brunnock – "Red Line"
- Gemitaiz – "Collier"
- Gemitaiz – "Forever True" feat. Bassi Maestro, Ensi
- Gemitaiz – "Winners & Losers" feat. Sercho
- Guè Pequeno – "Amore O Soldi 2013" feat. Daniele Vit
- FRancesco Rigon – "La vera storia de La Bella e La Bestia" (musical play)
- FRancesco Rigon – "Provaci ancora Pinocchio" (musical comedy)

2015

- Moreno – “Incredibile”
- Clementino - "Lo strano caso di Iena White", "Boom" feat. Guè Pequeno and Fabri Fibra
- Guè Pequeno - "Equilibrio"

== See also ==
- Italian hip hop
