= Sweatsuit (album) =

Compilation album by Nelly
- Released: November 22, 2005
- Recorded: 2003–2005
- Genres: Hip hop; R&B
- Length: 73:41
- Labels: Universal; Derrty; Fo' Reel

Nelly chronology
Suit (2004)	Sweatsuit (2005)	Brass Knuckles (2008)

Alternative cover

Sweatsuit is a compilation album by American rapper Nelly, released on November 22, 2005. The album consists of tracks from his 2004 simultaneous album releases, Sweat and Suit. The US edition of the compilation also includes four extra tracks, including the single "Grillz" featuring rappers Paul Wall and Ali & Gipp, which reached number one on the Billboard Hot 100 chart; along with The Notorious B.I.G. single "Nasty Girl", "Tired" featuring Avery Storm, and "Fly Away" from the soundtrack of the 2005 film The Longest Yard.

Sweatsuit received positive reviews from critics, for containing the highlights from both Sweat and Suit, praising its material quality. Commercially, the compilation peaked at 26 on the US Billboard 200, and reached the top 40 in Australia and New Zealand. It has been certified gold by the Recording Industry Association of America (RIAA), for shipments of 500,000 copies.

== Background ==
While recording material for his third studio album, Nelly originally had the intention of producing one album. Songs were being recorded at a steady pace, with Nelly composing more ideas, to which he established the idea of two albums released simultaneously to house all the tracks. On April 27, 2004, Nelly's representative initially described the upcoming albums as thematically dissimilar, "one is more melodic and party-oriented in the vein of records like "E.I." and "Tip Drill", while the other was described as having a "harder edge". Nelly would release singles accompanied by music videos from both albums. Talking to MTV News, Nelly went on to describe the differences between both albums; their titles of Sweat and Suit were announced on May 27, 2004. He noted Sweat as "more up-tempo" and "energetic", while characterizing Suit as more of "a grown-up and sexy vibe [...] it's more melodic".

== Release ==
The compilation was released in the UK on May 6, 2005 and in the US on November 22.

== Reception ==
=== Critical ===
AllMusic's Jason Birchmeier saw Sweatsuit as an album that combines the highlights of Sweat and Suit, and one that should have been released initially. Birchmeier went on to criticize the compilation's track sequencing, and described the new songs as "unexceptional." Though he summarized its material as "a solid, well-balanced, smoothly mixed listen," awarding the compilation four out of five stars. RapReviews.com's Steve Juon gave Sweatsuit an eight out of ten. Juon didn't see the new tracks as reason to purchase the compilation; he saw it as discarding material not targeted towards a pop audience, to make the compilation more attractive to new buyers who didn't get either Sweat or Suit. Ultimately, Juon went on to praise Nelly's consistency, confidence and the combination of pop and hip hop within the material.

=== Commercial ===
Sweatsuit peaked at number 26 on the US Billboard 200 chart, remaining on the chart for twenty-four weeks. The compilation peaked at number 6 and 5 on the Top R&B/Hip-Hop Albums and Top Rap Albums, respectively. It was certified gold by the Recording Industry Association of America (RIAA), for shipments of 500,000 copies. On the Australian Albums Chart, Sweatsuit debuted at number 25, peaking at number 24 on the following week. It remained on the chart for ten weeks before dropping out on the week of August 21, 2005. The compilation peaked at number 36 on the New Zealand Albums Chart, dropping off on the following week. On the UK Albums Chart, it peaked at number 41. It was certified silver by the British Phonographic Industry (BPI).

== Track listing ==
Sweatsuit track listing
No.	Title	Writer(s)	Producer(s)	Length
1.	"Play It Off" (featuring Pharrell)	Cornell Haynes Jr.; Chad Hugo; Pharrell Williams	The Neptunes	3:47
2.	"My Place" (featuring Jaheim)	Haynes Jr.; Eldra DeBarge; Etterlene Jordan; Kenneth Gamble; Leon Huff; Randy Edelman; William DeBarge; Jaheim Hoagland; Dorian "Doe" Moore	Doe	5:36
3.	"Over and Over" (featuring Tim McGraw)	Haynes Jr.; Bridges; James Hargrove; Samuel McGraw	Bridges	4:14
4.	"Flap Your Wings"	Haynes Jr.; Hugo; Williams	The Neptunes	4:03
5.	"Pretty Toes" (featuring Jazze Pha and T.I.)	Haynes Jr.; Phalon Alexander; André Benjamin; Patrick Brown; Clifford Harris Jr.; Raymond "Yoda" Murray; Antwan Patton; Rico Wade	Jazze Pha	4:28
6.	"She Don't Know My Name" (featuring Snoop Dogg and Ronald Isley)	Haynes Jr.; Calvin Broadus Jr.; Ronald Isley; Patton; Nsilo Reddick; Nicholas Sherwood	Big Boi; The Beat Bullies	4:26
7.	"Nobody Knows" (featuring Anthony Hamilton)	Haynes Jr.; Jermaine Mauldin; Anthony Hamilton; James Phillips	Mauldin	4:39
8.	"Heart of a Champion" (featuring Lincoln University Vocal Ensemble)	Haynes Jr.; Phillip Duckett; John Tesh	Duckett	4:29
9.	"Na-NaNa-Na" (featuring Jazze Pha)	Haynes Jr.; Phalon Alexander; Jasper Cameron	Jazze Pha	3:59
10.	"Get'cha Get'cha" (featuring St. Lunatics)	Haynes Jr.; Harper; Jones; Cleveland; Wayne Nugent; Kevin Risto	Midi Mafia	4:37
11.	"River Don't Runnn" (featuring Murphy Lee and Stephen Marley)	Haynes Jr.; Harper; Marley; Moore	Doe	4:59
12.	"Playa" (featuring Mobb Deep and Missy Elliott)	Haynes Jr.; Alan Maman; Melissa Elliott; Albert Johnson; Kejuan Muchita; Cleveland; Lee Ryda	The Alchemist	3:57
13.	"'N' Dey Say"	Haynes Jr.; Jayson "Koko" Bridges; Gary Kemp	Bridges	3:37
14.	"Fly Away"	Haynes Jr.; A. Martin; C. Schack; I. Matias; K. Karlin; Rashad Hill	Bridges	4:09
15.	"Grillz" (featuring Paul Wall and Ali & Gipp)	Haynes Jr.; Mauldin; Ali Jones; Cameron Gipp; James Phillips; Paul Slayton; Beyoncé Knowles; Kelendria Rowland; Tenitra Williams; Garrett Hamler; Harris Jr.; Rich Harrison	Jermaine Dupri	4:30
16.	"Tired" (featuring Avery Storm)	Haynes Jr.	P. Productions	3:16
17.	"Nasty Girl" (The Notorious B.I.G. featuring Diddy, Nelly, Jagged Edge and Avery Storm)	Haynes Jr.; Christopher Wallace; Steven Jordan; Sean Combs; Brian Casey; Brandon Casey; Leroy Watson	Jazze Pha	4:52
Total length:				73:41

Notes

- "My Place" contains a portion of composition from "Isn't It a Shame" by girl group Labelle and Randy DeBarge's 1982 "I Like It". It samples elements of singer Teddy Pendergrass' 1979 single "Come Go with Me".
- "Heart of a Champion" samples John Tesh' 1990 "Roundball Rock".
- "Na-NaNa-Na" samples Tupac Shakur's 1996 "2 of Amerikaz Most Wanted".
- "Playa" samples Lee Ryda's 1987 "Magnetic Dance 2".
- "'N' Dey Say" samples Spandau Ballet’s 1983 "True".
- "Grillz" contains interpolations of Destiny's Child's 2004 "Soldier" and MC Shan's 1987 "Left Me Lonely".

== Personnel ==
Credits adapted from AllMusic.

- Victor Abijaudi – engineer
- The Alchemist – audio production, producer
- Ali – featured artist, main personnel, rap
- Ali & Gipp – performer, primary artist
- Kori Anders – mixing
- Avery Storm – featured artist, guest artist, main personnel, primary artist, vocals
- Big Gipp – guest artist
- Biggie – featured artist
- Mr. Leslie Braithwaite – mixing
- Matt Brauss – brass
- Jayson Bridges – audio production, drums, percussion, producer
- Sandy Brummels – art direction
- Al Byno – engineer
- Jasper Cameron – featured artist, main personnel, producer, vocals
- Chris Carmouche – engineer
- Jason Carson – engineer
- Andrew Coleman – engineer
- Diddy – featured artist, main personnel, primary artist, rap
- Phillip Duckett – producer
- Jermaine Dupri – audio production, mixing, producer
- Missy Elliott – featured artist, guest artist, main personnel, primary artist, rap
- Brian Frye – engineer
- Richard "Rip" Gager – guitar
- Chris Gehringer – mastering
- Gipp – featured artist, main personnel, rap
- Harold Guy – assistant engineer
- Anthony Hamilton – featured artist, guest artist, main personnel, primary artist, vocals
- James D. "Sted Fast" II Hargrove – guitar, producer
- John Horesco IV – engineer, mixing
- Jun Ishizeki – engineer
- Ronald Isley – featured artist, guest artist, primary artist
- Jagged Edge – featured artist, guest artist, main personnel, primary artist, rap
- Jaheim – featured artist, main personnel, vocals
- King James II – engineer

- Jazze Pha – audio production, featured artist, guest artist, main personnel, primary artist, producer, rap
- Kim Moore Johnson – vocals (background)
- Rajinder Kala – congas
- Chip Karpells – engineer, mixing
- Debra Killings – bass
- Kevin Law – engineer
- Marc Stephen Lee – engineer
- Murphy Lee – featured artist, main personnel, primary artist, vocals
- Lincoln University Vocal Ensemble – featured artist, main personnel, vocals
- Bryan Loss – drums
- Lunatics – featured artist
- Stephen Marley – featured artist, main personnel, primary artist, vocals
- Dan "Thunda Dan" Marshal – engineer, guitar
- Brandon "B Don" Matthews – engineer
- NDoffene MBodji – assistant engineer
- Tim McGraw – featured artist, guest artist, main personnel, primary artist, vocals
- Tadd Mingo – assistant engineer, engineer
- Mobb Deep – featured artist, guest artist, main personnel, primary artist, rap
- Carl Nappa – engineer
- Nelly – main personnel, primary artist, vocals
- The Neptunes – audio production, producer
- Jared Nugent – assistant engineer
- Shorty B. – bass, guitar
- Snoop Dogg – featured artist, main personnel, primary artist, rap
- Nico Solis – engineer
- Joe Spiz – art direction, design
- St. Lunatics – main personnel, primary artist, vocals
- T.I. – featured artist, guest artist, main personnel, primary artist, vocals
- Phil Tan – mixing
- Richard Travali – mixing
- Serge Tsai – engineer
- Paul Wall – featured artist, guest artist, main personnel, primary artist, rap
- Bruce Waynne – producer
- James White – photography
- Pharrell Williams – featured artist, guest artist, main personnel, primary artist, vocals
- Denis Szpak Chamecki - featured artist, guest artist, main personnel, primary artist, vocals, photography

== Charts ==
=== Weekly charts ===
Weekly chart performance for Sweatsuit
Chart (2005)	Peak position
Australian Albums (ARIA)	22
Australian Urban Albums (ARIA)	6
Japanese Albums (Oricon)	8
New Zealand Albums (RMNZ)	36
UK Albums (Official Charts)	41
UK R&B Albums (Official Charts)	11
US Billboard 200	26
US Top R&B/Hip-Hop Albums (Billboard)	6
US Top Rap Albums (Billboard)	5

=== Year-end charts ===
Year-end chart performance for Sweatsuit
Chart (2006)	Position
US Billboard 200	96
US Top R&B/Hip-Hop Albums (Billboard)	47

== Certifications ==
Certifications for Sweatsuit
Region	Certification	Certified units/sales
United Kingdom (BPI)	Gold	100,000^{‡}
United States (RIAA)	Gold	500,000^{^}
^{^} Shipments figures based on certification alone.^{‡} Sales+streaming figures based on certification alone.
