= Tilt Ya Head Back =

2004 single by Nelly

Single by Nelly featuring Christina Aguilera

from the album Sweat
- B-side: "Na-NaNa-Na"
- Released: September 15, 2004
- Studio: Record Plant (Los Angeles, CA)
- Genre: Hip hop; pop
- Length: 4:13
- Label: Universal
- Songwriters: Nelly; Dorian Moore; Tegemold Newton; Curtis Mayfield
- Producer: Doe Mo' Beats

Nelly singles chronology
"My Place" (2004)	"Tilt Ya Head Back" (2004)	"Over and Over" (2004)

Christina Aguilera singles chronology
"Car Wash" (2004)	"Tilt Ya Head Back" (2004)	"Somos Novios (It's Impossible)" (2006)

Music video
- "Tilt Ya Head Back" on YouTube

"Tilt Ya Head Back" is a song by American recording artists Nelly and Christina Aguilera, taken from Nelly's album Sweat (2004). The song was released to US radio stations on September 15, 2004, as the second single from the album. Written by Nelly, Dorian Moore and Tegemold Newton and produced by Doe Mo' Beats, "Tilt Ya Head Back" is a hip hop and pop number that features a sample of Curtis Mayfield's "Superfly".

Most contemporary critics responded positively towards the song, praising the duo's vocals and recognising it one of the album's highlights. Commercially, "Tilt Ya Head Back" garnered moderate success, peaking at number 58 on the US Billboard Hot 100 and charting within the top ten on the charts of Australia, Denmark, New Zealand, and the United Kingdom. An accompanying music video for "Tilt Ya Head Back" was directed by Little X. The duo performed the song at the 2004 MTV Video Music Awards, which gained positive feedback from media outlets.

== Background and composition ==
A 24 second sample of "Tilt Ya Head Back" showing call and response.

"Tilt Ya Head Back" was written by Nelly, Dorian Moore, Tegemold Newton, Curtis Mayfield and produced by Doe Mo' Beats. The producer of the song confirmed that it was originally meant for Nelly and Britney Spears, however Spears' record label Jive Records rejected the idea because they thought the song was "too urban." Following Spears, Janet Jackson and Christina Aguilera were approached to appear on "Tilt Ya Head Back", and the final choice was Aguilera. A demo recorded by Spears leaked in 2016.

"Tilt Ya Head Back" is a pop and hip hop number, which features elements from jazz and soul. The song is written in the key of F major with a moderate fast tempo of 116 beats per minute. It features "blasts" of brass and a bassline sample of Curtis Mayfield's "Superfly", and thus Mayfield was credited as a co-writer of the track. Joe Muggs from The Daily Telegraph noted that the duo's vocals are similar to "old-school soul voices of Ron Isley and Anthony Hamilton."

== Promotion ==
On August 29, 2004, Nelly and Aguilera performed "Tilt Ya Head Back" at the 2004 MTV Video Music Awards. The performance was praised by media outlets, Brian Hiatt from Entertainment Weekly praised Aguilera's new look with blonde curly hair, which was different from her previous image during the promotion of Stripped, and called it the "Best Makeover" of the awards. Reporting the ceremony, James Montgomery wrote, "As she warmed up her pipes, the power of her vocal exercises caused people standing outside her dressing room to jump. Her performance partner Nelly lounged nearby, trying to decide which afterparties to attend. After they finished their duet, fellow St. Lunatics['] Murphy Lee congratulated them, yelling, "That sh-- [sic] was hot!" John Walker from MTV Buzzworthy appreciated the 1920s-inspired theme of the performance and listed it as one of Aguilera's best performances on the MTV Video Music Awards as of 2013. A music video for "Tilt Ya Head Back" was directed by Little X. In the video, Nelly acts as a 1940s gangster, while Aguilera portrays Marilyn Monroe. During the making of the clip, Nelly gifted Aguilera US$55,000 worth jewels as a parting present, resulting in a rumor that the duo were romantically involved.

== Release and reception ==
"Tilt Ya Head Back" impacted on US contemporary hit radio stations in September 2004 by Universal Music as the second single from Sweat. It was released as a digital download single, a digital EP and a CD single on November 15, 2004. A 12-inch record of the song was released on November 18, 2004. "Tilt Ya Head Back" was well received by most music critics, Jason Birchmeier from AllMusic picked this song as a standout from the album and wrote that the song could be a hit "whether on radio" or "on MTV." David Browne of Entertainment Weekly praised the duo's vocal on the song, while Rolling Stone editor Rob Sheffield named it "a completely pop duet." Michael Paoletta from Billboard praised the "Superfly" sample used in the track and its musical style. Writing for The Washington Post, Sean Daly appreciated Aguilera's appearance on "Tilt Ya Head Back" as "a frisky Aguilera matching Nelly bedroom boast for boast." On a less positive review, The Daily Telegraph's Joe Muggs complimented Aguilera's "undeniably impressive voice", however he thought that the duo's vocal performance did not match each other. Tom Moon of The Philadelphia Inquirer called the song "an addictive, wound-tight James Brown groove." Writing for the Idolator, Mike Wass noted that "Christina and Nelly turned out to be a match made in hip-hop/pop heaven".

Although it was expected to be a hit, "Tilt Ya Head Back" only experienced moderate chart success. Following its airplay release, "Tilt Ya Head Back" garnered 22 million audio impressions in 119 stations. The audience amount was much less in comparison to Nelly's previous single "My Place" (96 million in 294 radio stations). On the US Billboard Hot 100, "Tilt Ya Head Back" debuted at number 75 during the week of September 25, 2004, and later reached the peak of number 58. In the UK, the single debuted at number five on the UK Singles Chart on November 28, 2004, and later became its peak position. The song also gained commercial success in regions including New Zealand (number four), Australia (number five) and Denmark (number eight). It was certified Platinum by the Australian Recording Industry Association (ARIA), and Gold by the Recording Industry Association of America (RIAA).

== Track listings ==
CD single and digital download single

1. "Tilt Ya Head Back"– 4:13
2. "Na-NaNa-Na" – 3:59

12-inch vinyl

1. "Tilt Ya Head Back" – 4:13
2. "Flap Your Wings (Full Phatt Remix) – 4:18

Digital download EP

1. "Tilt Ya Head Back" – 4:13
2. "Na-NaNa-Na" – 3:59
3. "Flap Your Wings (Full Phatt Remix)" – 4:18

== Charts ==
=== Weekly charts ===
Weekly chart performance for "Tilt Ya Head Back"
Chart (2004–2005)	Peak position
Australia (ARIA)	5
Australian Urban (ARIA)	2
Austria (Ö3 Austria Top 40)	42
Belgium (Ultratop 50 Flanders)	34
Belgium (Ultratip Bubbling Under Wallonia)	2
Canada CHR/Pop Top 30 (Radio & Records)	24
Croatia (HRT)	4
Denmark (Tracklisten)	8
Europe (Eurochart Hot 100)	14
Finland (Suomen virallinen lista)	16
Germany (GfK)	27
Greece (IFPI)	16
Ireland (IRMA)	12
Netherlands (Dutch Top 40)	16
Netherlands (Single Top 100)	16
New Zealand (Recorded Music NZ)	4
Poland (LP3)	43
Scotland Singles (OCC)	6
Switzerland (Schweizer Hitparade)	16
UK Singles (OCC)	5
UK Hip Hop/R&B (OCC)	2
US Billboard Hot 100	58
US Pop Airplay (Billboard)	26
US Rhythmic Airplay (Billboard)	38

=== Year-end charts ===
2004 year-end chart performance for "Tilt Ya Head Back"
Chart (2004)	Position
Australia (ARIA)	86
UK Singles (OCC)	98
UK Urban (Music Week) "Na-NaNa-Na" / "Tilt Ya Head Back"	11

2005 year-end chart performance for "Tilt Ya Head Back"
Chart (2005)	Position
Australia (ARIA)	66

== Certifications ==
Certifications and sales for "Tilt Ya Head Back"
Region	Certification	Certified units/sales
Australia (ARIA)	Platinum	70,000^{^}
United States (RIAA)	Gold	500,000^{*}
^{*} Sales figures based on certification alone.^{^} Shipments figures based on certification alone.
