= Sweatsuit =

Sweatsuit may refer to:

- Sweatsuit, a set of exercise clothing comprising a sweatshirt and sweatpants
- Tracksuit, a set of athletic wear comprising trousers and a jacket, usually with a front zipper
- Sweatsuit (album), by Nelly, 2005
