= Grillz (song) =

2005 single by Nelly

Single by Nelly featuring Paul Wall and Ali & Gipp

from the album Sweatsuit
- B-side: "Tired"
- Released: November 1, 2005
- Length: 4:30
- Label: Universal; Fo' Reel Entertainment; Derrty Entertainment
- Songwriters: Nelly; Paul Wall; Ali and Gipp; Jermaine Dupri; James Phillips; Richard Harrison; Beyoncé Knowles; Kelly Rowland; Michelle Williams; Sean Garrett; Clifford Harris; Dwayne Carter
- Producer: Jermaine Dupri

Nelly singles chronology
"Get It Poppin'" (2005)	"Grillz" (2005)	"Nasty Girl" (2005)

Paul Wall singles chronology
"Sittin' Sidewayz" (2005)	"Grillz" (2005)	"Still on It" (2005)

Ali & Gipp singles chronology
"Grillz" (2005)	"Go 'Head" (2005)

"Grillz" is a song by American rapper Nelly featuring fellow American rappers Paul Wall and Ali & Gipp, and uncredited vocals from American singer Brandi Williams of the group Blaque. The song was written by Nelly, Paul Wall, Ali and Gipp, Jermaine Dupri, and LRoc. It contains samples of Destiny's Child's "Soldier". Production was handled by Dupri, with additional production from LRoc. Following its release, it topped the US Billboard Hot 100 and reached the top 20 in Australia, Ireland, and New Zealand.

== Awards ==
In 2007, the song was nominated for Best Rap Performance as a Duo or Group at the 49th Annual Grammy Awards, losing to Chamillionaire's "Ridin'".

== Chart performance ==
"Grillz" reached number one on the US Billboard Hot 100. It stayed on the top spot for two consecutive weeks. At the end of the year it was ranked number 12 on the Billboard 2006 year-end chart. The Recording Industry Association of America (RIAA) certified "Grillz" platinum for 1,000,000 digital sales and for 1,000,000 mastertone sales.

== Music video ==
The song's music video, directed by Fat Cats, was released in 2005. Jermaine Dupri, Big Boi, Iamsu!, Avery Storm, St. Lunatics, Taylor Made, Jung Tru, Chocolate Tai, Johnny Dang, and Brandi Williams of Blaque make cameo appearances throughout the video.

== Track listings ==
US 12-inch single

1. "Grillz" (dirty version) – 4:30
2. "Grillz" (clean version) – 4:30
3. "Grillz" (instrumental) – 4:30

UK, European, and Australasian CD single

1. "Grillz" (radio edit) – 3:47
2. "Grillz" (explicit) – 4:30
3. "Tired" (album version explicit featuring Avery Storm) – 3:17
4. "Grillz" (video)

UK 12-inch single

A1. "Grillz" (radio edit) – 3:47
A2. "Grillz" (explicit) – 4:30
B1. "Grillz" (instrumental) – 4:30
B2. "Tired" (album version explicit featuring Avery Storm) – 3:17

== Charts ==
=== Weekly charts ===
Chart (2005–2006)	Peak position
Australia (ARIA)	11
Australian Urban (ARIA)	3
Austria (Ö3 Austria Top 40)	74
Canada CHR/Pop Top 30 (Radio & Records)	21
Germany (GfK)	53
Ireland (IRMA)	12
New Zealand (Recorded Music NZ)	10
Scotland Singles (Official Charts)	31
UK Singles (Official Charts)	24
UK Hip Hop/R&B (Official Charts)	4
US Billboard Hot 100	1
US Hot R&B/Hip-Hop Songs (Billboard)	2
US Hot Rap Songs (Billboard)	1
US Pop Airplay (Billboard)	7
US Rhythmic Airplay (Billboard)	1

=== Year-end charts ===
Chart (2006)	Position
Australia (ARIA)	81
Australian Urban (ARIA)	23
UK Urban (Music Week)	19
US Billboard Hot 100	12
US Hot R&B/Hip-Hop Songs (Billboard)	11
US Rhythmic Airplay (Billboard)	5

== Certifications ==
Region	Certification	Certified units/sales
United States (RIAA)	Gold	500,000^{‡}
United States (RIAA) Digital	Platinum	1,000,000^{*}
United States (RIAA) Mastertone	Platinum	1,000,000^{*}
^{*} Sales figures based on certification alone.^{‡} Sales+streaming figures based on certification alone.

== Release history ==
Region	Date	Format(s)	Label(s)	Ref.
United States	November 1, 2005	Rhythmic contemporary radio	Universal; Fo' Reel Entertainment; Derrty Ent.	
United States	December 13, 2005	Contemporary hit radio	Universal; Fo' Reel Entertainment; Derrty Ent.	
United Kingdom	March 20, 2006	CD	Universal; Fo' Reel Entertainment; Derrty Ent.	
Australia	March 27, 2006	CD	Universal; Fo' Reel Entertainment; Derrty Ent.	

== See also ==
- List of Hot 100 number-one singles of 2006 (U.S.)
