= Duets: The Final Chapter =

2005 posthumous remix album by the Notorious B.I.G.

Remix album by The Notorious B.I.G.
- Released: December 20, 2005
- Recorded: 1992–1997 (The Notorious B.I.G.'s vocals & 2Pac's guest vocals); 2004–2005 (Production, guest vocals, and mixing)
- Genre: Hip-hop
- Length: 73:19
- Labels: Bad Boy; Atlantic
- Producers: Diddy (exec.); The Notorious B.I.G. (exec.); Atticus Ross; Chink Santana; Clinton Sparks; Coptic Sounds; Danja; DJ Green Lantern; Dre & Vidal; Eminem; Havoc; Jazze Pha; J-Dub; Jonathan Davis; Just Blaze; LV; Mario Winans; Reefa; Scott Storch; Scram Jones; Sean Cane; Static Major; Stevie J; Suga Mike; Swizz Beatz

The Notorious B.I.G. chronology
Born Again (1999)	Duets: The Final Chapter (2005)	Greatest Hits (2007)

Singles from Duets: The Final Chapter
- 1. "Nasty Girl" Released: October 11, 2005; 2. "Spit Your Game" Released: February 24, 2006

Duets: The Final Chapter (sometimes referred to as The Biggie Duets) is the second posthumous album by American rapper The Notorious B.I.G., released by Bad Boy Records and Atlantic Records in the UK on December 19, 2005, and in the US on December 20. The album debuted at No. 3 on the Billboard 200, selling 438,000 copies in its first week, trailing behind the debut of Mary J. Blige's The Breakthrough and the high sales of Jamie Foxx's Unpredictable. In the UK, it reached No. 13 following the release of the lead single "Nasty Girl". It is his second posthumous album to be certified platinum by the RIAA.

== Critical reception ==
Professional ratings

Review scores
- Source: Rating
AllMusic	2.5/5 stars
Entertainment Weekly	B+
HipHopDX	1.5/5
Pitchfork	4.2/10
PopMatters	3/10
Rolling Stone	2/5 stars
Slant Magazine	2/5 stars
Spin	F
Stylus Magazine	B−
USA Today	4/4 stars

The album received mixed reviews from critics. Peter Relic of Rolling Stone commented that the title was inaccurate because the guest artists often overshadowed Biggie, adding that the appearances lacked substance. Andy Kellman of AllMusic rated the album 2.5 out of 5. Soren Baker of the Los Angeles Times gave it two stars out of four, while Steve Jones of USA Today gave it a perfect four-star rating.

Method Man was a vocal critic of the album, stating that "they got niggas on that album Big would have never rocked with, for real." He highlighted that he was the only guest rapper Biggie intentionally chose for his debut album, Ready to Die.

== Singles ==
"Nasty Girl" was released as the lead single on October 11, 2005. Featuring P. Diddy, Nelly, Jagged Edge, and Avery Storm, the song reached No. 1 in the UK, where it stayed for two weeks, becoming Biggie's first number-one single in that country. In the US, it peaked at No. 45 on the Billboard Hot 100.

== Track listing ==
No.	Title	Writer(s)	Producer(s)	Length
1.	"B.I.G. Live in Jamaica" (Intro)		J-Dub	1:22
2.	"It Has Been Said" (featuring Diddy, Eminem and Obie Trice)	Christopher Wallace; Chris Martin; Jalacy Hawkins; Sean Combs; Jason Phillips; Trevor Smith; William Conti; Steven Jordan; Marshall Mathers; Obie Trice III; Leroy Watson	Eminem; Luis Resto^{[b]}	3:18
3.	"Spit Your Game" (featuring Twista and Bone Thugs-N-Harmony)	Wallace; Combs; Jordan; Anthony Henderson; Byron McCane; Joey Brooks; Steven Howse; Carl Mitchell	Swizz Beatz	4:09
4.	"Whatchu Want" (The Commission featuring Jay-Z and The Notorious B.I.G.)	Wallace; Shawn Carter	Danja	3:54
5.	"Get Your Grind On" (featuring Big Pun, Fat Joe and Freeway)	Wallace; Carlos Broady; Combs; Darryl McDaniels; Nashiem Myrick; Christopher Rios; Joseph Cartagena; Leslie Pridgen	Sean Cane; Diddy^{[a]}	5:24
6.	"Living the Life" (featuring Snoop Dogg, Ludacris, Faith Evans, Cheri Dennis and Bobby Valentino)	Wallace; Barry White; Deric Angelettie; Trevell Coleman; Melissa Elliott; Craig Mack; Jerry Butler; Marvin Yancy; Calvin Broadus; Chris Bridges; Faith Evans	Coptic; Diddy^{[a]}	4:28
7.	"The Greatest Rapper" (Interlude)		Faith Evans	0:08
8.	"1970 Somethin'" (featuring The Game and Faith Evans)	Wallace; Diana King; Harry Wayne Casey; Jayceon Taylor; Jack Knight; Stephen Garrett	Andre Harris & Vidal Davis	3:25
9.	"Nasty Girl" (featuring Diddy, Nelly, Jagged Edge and Avery Storm)	Wallace; Jordan; Combs; Cornell Haynes; Brian Casey; Brandon Casey; Watson	Jazze Pha	4:46
10.	"Living in Pain" (featuring 2Pac, Mary J. Blige and Nas)	Wallace; Tupac Shakur; Christopher Walker; Nasir Jones; Michael Carlos Jones; Mario Winans; Mary J. Blige; Lamont Dozier	Just Blaze	4:01
11.	"I'm with Whateva" (featuring Lil Wayne, Juelz Santana and Jim Jones)	Wallace; Combs; Osten Harvey, Jr.; Barbara Mason; Dwayne Carter; LaRon James; Joseph Jones; John Carpenter	Stevie J; Diddy^{[a]}	2:33
12.	"Beef" (featuring Mobb Deep)	Phillip Hurt; Bunny Sigler; Kaz Tabata; Wallace; Combs; Myrick; Burt Bacharach; Broady; Hal David; Albert Johnson; Kejuan Muchita	Havoc	4:57
13.	"My Dad" (Interlude)		Wayne Barrow	0:10
14.	"Hustler's Story" (featuring Scarface, Akon and Big Gee)	Wallace; Myrick; Aliaune Thiam; Knight; Rahim Beyah; Brad Jordan; Miguel Scott	Reefa; Mike "Suga Mike" Allen; Diddy^{[a]}; Mario Winans^{[a]}; J-Dub^{[a]}	5:47
15.	"Breakin' Old Habits" (featuring T.I. and Slim Thug)	Wallace; Rashad Smith; S. Carter; Kelly Price; Todd Gaither; Oliver Lain; Burton Smith; Clifford Harris; Stayve Thomas	Chink Santana	4:36
16.	"Ultimate Rush" (featuring Missy Elliott)	Wallace; Kim Jones; Isaac Hayes; Elliott	Scott Storch	3:48
17.	"Mi Casa" (featuring R. Kelly and Charlie Wilson)	Wallace; Harvey, Jr.; Black Mambo; Ronald Bell; Robert Bell; Dean Taylor; Dennis Thomas; Meekaaeel Muhammed; Claydes Smith; Earl Toon; George Brown; Robert Kelly; Todd Muhammad	DJ Green Lantern; Diddy^{[a]}; Winans^{[a]}; J-Dub^{[a]}	4:12
18.	"Little Homie" (Interlude)		Harve "Joe Hooker" Pierre; D-Dot	0:34
19.	"Hold Ya Head" (featuring Bob Marley)	Wallace; Lord Finesse; Rita Marley	Clinton Sparks; Diddy^{[a]}	2:45
20.	"Just a Memory" (featuring Clipse)	Wallace; Combs; Jordan; Ethram Lopez; Jean Louhsdon; Billy Preston; George Johnson; Terrence Thornton; Gene Thornton; Lord Finesse; Don Black; Charles Aznavour; Gerry Goffin; Michael Masser	Scram Jones	4:30
21.	"Wake Up" (featuring Korn)	Wallace; Angeletti; Henri Charlamagne; Dwight Grant; O'Shea Jackson; Eric Matlock; Robert Ross; Jonathan Davis; Fieldy Arvizu; James Shaffer; Atticus Ross	Jonathan Davis; Atticus Ross	3:35
22.	"Love Is Everlasting" (Outro)		Wayne Barrow; Harve "Joe Hooker" Pierre	0:57

Notes

- ^{^[a]} signifies a co-producer
- ^{^[b]} signifies an additional producer

Sample credits

- "It Has Been Said" contains excerpts from:
  - "Kick In The Door", performed by The Notorious B.I.G., written by Christopher Wallace, Chris Martin, and Jalacy Hawkins.
  - "Victory", performed by Puff Daddy, written by Sean Combs, William Conti, Steven Jordan, Jason Phillips, Trevor Smith, and Christopher Wallace.
- "Spit Your Game" contains excerpts from:
  - "Notorious Thugs", performed by The Notorious B.I.G., written by Christopher Wallace, Sean Combs, Steven Jordan, Anthony Henderson, Byron McCane, and Steven Howse.
  - "My Ship Is Coming In", performed by Walter Jackson, written by Joey Brooks.
- "Get Your Grind On" contains excerpts from "My Downfall", performed by The Notorious B.I.G., written by Christopher Wallace, Carlos Broady, Sean Combs, Darryl McDaniels, and Nashiem Myrick.
- "Living the Life" contains excerpts from:
  - "Take Time to Tell Her", performed by Jerry Butler, written by Jerry Butler and Marvin Yancy.
  - "Let Me Get Down", performed by The Notorious B.I.G., written by Christopher Wallace, Barry White, Deric Angelettie, Trevell Coleman, Melissa Elliott, and Craig Mack.
- "1970 Somethin'" contains excerpts from "Respect", performed by The Notorious B.I.G., written by Christopher Wallace, Diana King, and Harry Wayne Casey.
- "Nasty Girl" contains excerpts from "Nasty Boy", performed by The Notorious B.I.G., written by Christopher Wallace, Sean Combs, and Steven Jordan.
- "Living in Pain" contains excerpts from "Blue Sky and Silver Bird", performed and written by Lamont Dozier.
- I'm with Whatever" contains:
  - excerpts from "Ready to Die", performed by The Notorious B.I.G., written by Christopher Wallace, Sean Combs, Osten Harvey, Jr., and Barbara Mason.
  - an interpolation from "Halloween", performed and written by John Carpenter.
- "Beef" contains excerpts from:
  - "My Other Love", performed by Bunny Sigler, written by Phillip Hurt, Bunny Sigler, and Kay Tabata.
  - "What's Beef", performed by The Notorious B.I.G., written by Christopher Wallace, Sean Combs, Nashiem Myrick, Burt Bacharach, Carlos Broady, and Hal David.
- "Hustler's Story" contains excerpts from "You'll See", performed by The Notorious B.I.G., written by Christopher Wallace and Nasheim Myrick.
- "Breakin' Old Habits" contains excerpts from "Young G's", performed by P. Diddy, written by Christopher Wallace, Rashad Smith, Shawn Carter, Kelly Price, Todd Gaither, Oliver Lain, and Burton Smith.
- "Ultimate Rush" contains excerpts from "Drugs", performed by Lil' Kim, written by Christopher Wallace, Kim Jones, and Isaac Hayes.
- "Mi Casa" contains excerpts from "Friend of Mine", performed by The Notorious B.I.G., written by Christopher Wallace, Osten Harvey, Jr., Black Mambo, Ronald Bell, Robert Bell, Dean Taylor, Dennis Thomas, Meekaaeel Muhammed, Claydes Smith, Earl Toon, and George Brown.
- "Hold Ya Head" contains excerpts from:
  - "Johnny Was", performed by Bob Marley and the Wailers, written by Rita Marley.
  - "Suicidal Thoughts", performed by The Notorious B.I.G., written by Christopher Wallace and Robert Hall.
- "Just a Memory" contains excerpts from:
  - "You're Nobody", performed by The Notorious B.I.G., written by Christopher Wallace, Sean Combs, Steven Jordan, Ethram Lopez, Jean Louhsdon, Billy Preston, and George Johnson.
  - "Come On", performed by The Notorious B.I.G., written by Christopher Wallace, Robert Hall, Don Black, Charles Aznavour, Gerry Goffin, and Michael Masser.
- "Wake Up" contains excerpts from "If I Die Before I Wake", performed by The Notorious B.I.G., written by Christopher Wallace, Deric Angeletti, Henri Charlamagne, Dwight Grant, O'Shea Jackson, Eric Matlock, and Robert Ross.

== Charts ==
=== Weekly charts ===
Chart (2005–2006)	Peak position
Belgian Albums (Ultratop Flanders)	20
Dutch Albums (Album Top 100)	43
French Albums (SNEP)	35
German Albums (Offizielle Top 100)	55
Irish Albums (IRMA)	8
Italian Albums (FIMI)	45
New Zealand Albums (RMNZ)	8
Swiss Albums (Schweizer Hitparade)	29
UK Albums (Official Charts)	13
US Billboard 200	3

=== Year-end charts ===
Chart (2006)	Position
US (Billboard 200)	52
US Top R&B/Hip-Hop Albums (Billboard)	11

== Certifications ==
Region	Certification	Certified units/sales
Ireland (IRMA)	Platinum	15,000^{^}
New Zealand (RMNZ)	Platinum	15,000^{‡}
United Kingdom (BPI)	Gold	100,000^{^}
United States (RIAA)	Platinum	1,000,000^{^}
^{^} Shipments figures based on certification alone.^{‡} Sales+streaming figures based on certification alone.
