= Easy! =

2011 film

- Film poster
- Directed by: Francesco Bruni
- Written by: Giambattista Avellino; Francesco Bruni
- Screenplay by: Francesco Bruni
- Produced by: Beppe Caschetto
- Starring: Fabrizio Bentivoglio; Filippo Scicchitano; Barbora Bobuľová; Vinicio Marchioni
- Cinematography: Arnaldo Catinari
- Edited by: Marco Spoletini
- Music by: The Ceasars (Ceasar Productions)
- Release date: 18 November 2011
- Running time: 95 minutes
- Country: Italy
- Language: Italian

Easy! (Italian: Scialla!) is a 2011 Italian comedy-drama film directed by Francesco Bruni.

== Cast ==
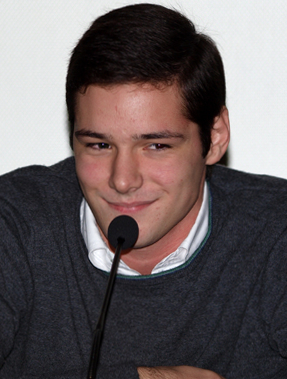
Filippo Scicchitano as Luca

- Fabrizio Bentivoglio as Bruno
- Filippo Scicchitano as Luca
- Barbora Bobuľová as Tina
- Vinicio Marchioni as Il Poeta
- Stefano Brunori as Stefano
- Franco Campiti as Franco
- Giacomo Ceccarelli as Valerio
- Paola Tiziana Cruciani as Giovanna
- Adamo Dionisi as Il Piccoletto
- Giuseppe Guarino as Carmelo
- Raffaella Lebboroni as Professor Di Biagio
- Natascia Macchniz as the high-school secretary

== Plot ==
A retired teacher and novelist (Bruno), who survives by private tutoring, is currently writing the biography for former adult star (Tina). He then discovers that one of his students (Luca), a teenager who is on the brink of failure at school, is actually his son.

== Music ==
The twelve tracks of the original soundtrack were produced by The Ceasars and sung by the Italian rapper Amir Issaa, then published by EMI Music Publishing Italy. The official videoclip of the film, directed by Gianluca Catania, won the 2012 Roma Videoclip Award. The Ceasars and Amir were nominated for the 2012 David di Donatello Award and Nastro d'Argento (silver ribbons) for the song “Scialla” and won the 2012 “Premio Cinema Giovane” for the best original soundtrack.

=== Tracks ===
1. FRancesco Rigon – Le onde
2. Amir – La parte del figlio
3. Amir – Scialla
4. FRancesco Rigon – Mr. Slide
5. Amir – Questa è Roma
6. Ceasar & PStarr – Pool party
7. Ceasar Productions – Macchina gialla
8. Amir – La strada parla
9. Ceasar & PStarr – Discoteque
10. Ceasar & PStarr – Scialla variazioni sul tema
11. FRancesco Rigon – Il gatto e la pioggia
12. Amir – Le ali per volare
