= Suit (album) =

Studio album by Nelly
- Released: September 13, 2004
- Recorded: 2003–04
- Genres: Hip hop; R&B
- Length: 48:43
- Labels: Derrty; Fo' Reel; Universal
- Producers: The Neptunes; Jazze Pha; Doe; AHM; Jayson "Koko" Bridges; Kuya Productions; Soulshock and Karlin; Ryan Bowser; Big Boi; the Beat Bullies

Nelly chronology
Sweat (2004)	Suit (2004)	Sweatsuit (2005)

Singles from Suit
- 1. "My Place" Released: July 17, 2004; 2. "Over and Over" Released: September 12, 2004; 3. "N Dey Say" Released: February 23, 2005

Suit is the fourth studio album by American rapper Nelly. It was intended to be released on August 17, 2004, before being delayed and released on September 13, 2004, by his label Derrty Entertainment, Fo' Reel Entertainment, and Universal Records. Production for the album was handled by several producers, including the Neptunes, Jazze Pha, Doe, AHM, Jayson "Koko" Bridges, Kuya Productions, Soulshock and Karlin, Ryan Bowser, Big Boi and Beat Bullies. Released in conjunction with Sweat, Nelly intended to release a single album before conceptualizing and releasing two albums simultaneously, both of which would contrast each other's themes. Nelly characterized Sweat as "more up-tempo" and "energetic" while describing Suit as more of "a grown-up and sexy vibe [...] it's more melodic".

The album produced three singles: "My Place", "Over and Over" and "'N' Dey Say". Its lead single, "My Place", was a commercial success, topping the New Zealand, Australian and UK single charts, becoming Nelly's second number one on the former and latter charts. It peaked at number four on the US Billboard Hot 100. "Over and Over" featuring country singer Tim McGraw was also a success, peaking at number three on the Hot 100, and topping several charts worldwide, including the Irish, Australian and UK Singles Charts. "My Place" and "Over and Over" were certified gold and platinum by the Recording Industry Association of America (RIAA), for shipments of 500,000 and one million copies, respectively. Suit's final single, "'N' Dey Say", achieved moderate chart success, peaking at number sixty-four on the Hot 100 and number six on the UK Singles Chart.

Suit was generally well received by music critics, who compared it with Sweat, praising both album's contrasting themes and musical content, though with some criticism also targeted towards their content, in regards to inconsistencies. Suit topped the US Billboard 200 chart in its opening week, selling 396,000 copies, becoming Nelly's third consecutive US number-one album. It went on to be certified three times platinum by the Recording Industry Association of America (RIAA), for shipments of three million copies. The album was nominated for a Grammy Award for Best Rap Album at the 47th Grammy Awards, losing to Kanye West's The College Dropout.

== Background ==
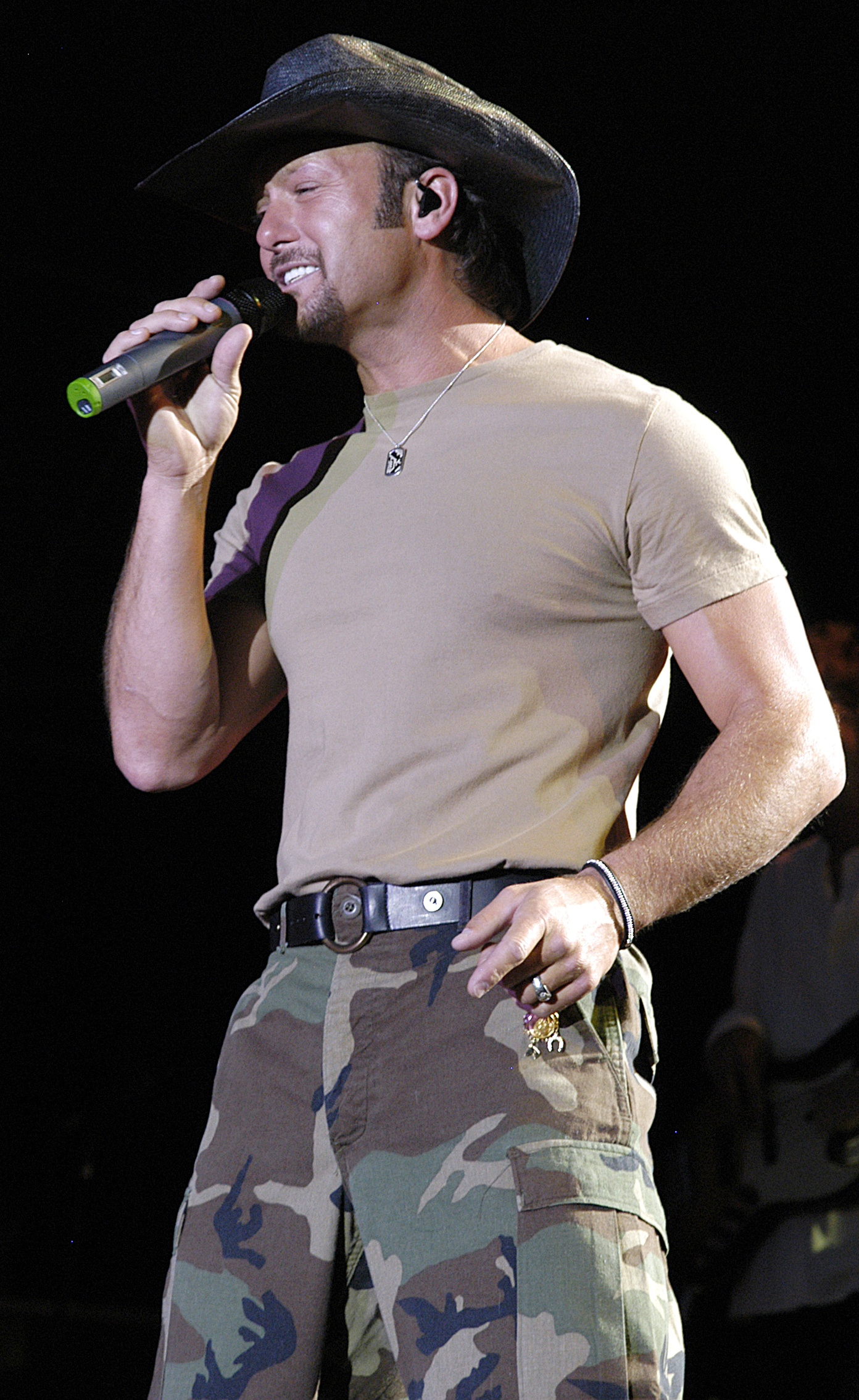
Country singer Tim McGraw contributes vocals on "Over and Over".

While recording material for his third studio album, Nelly had his intention of producing one album. Songs were being recorded at a steady pace, with Nelly composing more ideas, to which he established the idea of two albums released simultaneously to house all the tracks. On April 27, 2004, Nelly's representative initially described the upcoming albums as thematically dissimilar, "one is more melodic and party-oriented in the vein of records like "E.I." and "Tip Drill", while the other was described as having a "harder edge". Nelly would release singles accompanied by music videos from both albums. Talking to MTV News, Nelly went on to describe the differences between both albums; their titles of Sweat and Suit were announced on May 27, 2004. He noted Sweat as "more up-tempo" and "energetic", while characterizing Suit as more of "a grown-up and sexy vibe [...] it's more melodic".

== Release ==
Sweat and Suit were intended to be released on August 17, 2004, but was pushed back and released on September 14 in the United States, Canada and Japan. Suit was released on September 13, 2004 in the United Kingdom and Germany.

== Composition ==
The lead single "My Place" interlopes composition from "Isn't It a Shame" by girl group Labelle and Randy DeBarge's 1982 "I Like It". It also samples elements of the Del-Vikings' 1957 soul ballad "Come Go with Me", which Jason Birchmeier of Allmusic recognized as a large influence to the song. Bordering between the genres of hip-hop and R&B, the song is primarily an "adult-oriented Southern-tinged hip-hop love song," with guitars, synthesizers, and "mixed high" and "mixed low" beats. Other tracks that bare similar characteristics to "My Place" include "Paradise" (which also utilizes a "finger-picked guitar" throughout), "Pretty Toes" and "She Don't Know My Name". Birchmeier declared "My Place" as the successor to Nelly's 2002 "Dilemma". "Over and Over" is a break-up ballad, that combines Nelly’s sedate side with Tim McGraw’s "twanging" guitar and vocals, with McGraw providing an overdubbed hook. "'N' Dey Say" samples Spandau Ballet’s 1983 "True"; lyrically, the track and "Paradise" both engage in the themes of "hope and the promise of something better". "Nobody Knows" featuring Anthony Hamilton was chosen as the "most sonically inventive track" on Suit by Todd Burns of Stylus Magazine, who depicted its "orchestral stabs" and MIDI strings, which "interweave uneasily".

== Singles ==
"My Place" featuring Jaheim was released on July 20, 2004 as the album's lead single. It written by Nelly, Eldra DeBarge, Etterlene Jordan, Kenneth Gamble, Leon Huff, Randy Edelman, William DeBarge, Jaheim Hoagland, Dorian Moore and produced by Doe. The song topped both the New Zealand and Australian singles charts, becoming Nelly's first number one on the former chart, and his second on the latter, following "Dilemma". "My Place" remained on the charts for fifteen and thirteen weeks, respectively. The song became his second number one on the UK Singles Chart on the week of September 11, 2004, again following "Dilemma". On the US Billboard Hot 100 and Hot R&B/Hip-Hop Songs charts, it peaked at number four. "My Place" was certified gold by the Recording Industry Association of America (RIAA) and Recorded Music NZ, for shipments of 500,000 and 7,500 units, respectively. It was certified platinum by the Australian Recording Industry Association (ARIA), for shipments of 70,000 copies.

"Over and Over" featuring country singer Tim McGraw was released as the second single on October 12, 2004. It was written by Nelly, Jayson "KoKo" Bridges, James D. Hargrove and Samuel McGraw and produced by Bridges. The song achieved commercial success, topping several charts, including the Irish Singles Chart, Australian Singles Chart and UK Singles Chart. It is the second single from the album to top the latter and former charts, following "My Place". The song remained at number one in Australia for five consecutive weeks, and stayed atop in the UK for one week. "Over and Over" peaked within the top five on the New Zealand Singles Chart and the Hot 100, Nelly's second top five hit on the Hot 100 from the album . "Over and Over" was certified two times platinum by the ARIA, denoting shipments of 140,000 copies. The RIAA awarded the song with a single platinum certification, for shipments of one million copies.

"'N' Dey Say" was released as the album's third and final single on May 23, 2005. The song was written by Nelly, Jayson Bridges and G. Kemp and produced by the former. It achieved its highest peak of number three on the Belgian Singles Chart (Flanders); it reached number six on the UK Singles Chart and number eight on the Belgian Singles Chart (Wallonia). The song reached the top twenty on the Irish Singles Chart, Finnish Singles Chart, New Zealand Singles Chart and Australian Singles Chart. "'N' Dey Say" peaked at number sixty-four on the Hot 100, achieving moderate chart success in other territories.

== Critical reception ==
Professional ratings
Aggregate scores
Source	Rating
Metacritic	62/100
Review scores
Source	Rating
AllMusic	4/5 stars
Blender	3/5 stars
Entertainment Weekly	A−
The Guardian	2/5 stars
Los Angeles Times	3/4 stars
NME	1/10
RapReviews	9/10
Rolling Stone	3.5/5 stars
Stylus Magazine	D+
Vibe	3.5/5 stars

Suit received generally mixed reviews from music critics. At Metacritic, which assigns a normalized rating out of 100 to reviews from mainstream critics, the album has received an average score of 62, based on 16 reviews, which indicates "generally favorable reviews". Giving the album an A−, Entertainment Weekly's David Browne lauded Suit, writing that Nelly "sounds convincing and appealing" throughout the album. Browne went on to further praise specific songs including the "summer-breezy" "Play it Off" and the "cozy hip-hop soul" housed "In My Life". RapReviews.com's Steve Juon presented a similar response, giving the album a nine-out-of-ten rating. Juon depicted Suit as being more formal compared to Sweat which takes creative risks. He praised the overall material quality within both Suit and Sweat, as well as their contrasting themes, going on to note the albums as "one of the best double albums" in hip-hop. Jason Birchmeier of Allmusic was hesitant of the simultaneous release of two album's, as they may suffer from being one dimensional, but liked the musical content within both Suit and Sweat, noting the former's to be more diversified. Birchmeier summed up Suit as "a brief album with absolutely no filler", describing its tracks as "fun" and "catchy."

In a mixed review, Jason King of The Village Voice wrote that tracks on Suit have the "sole intention of ending up as your next ringtone". King noted some songs to "crumble" due to their "simplistic approach", while tracks like "Flap Your Wings" as "addictive". Stylus Magazine's Todd Burns praised several tracks on Suit, including "Over and Over" and "Nobody Knows", praising the former for combining Nelly's sedate side with Tim McGraw’s guitar and vocals. Despite this, Burns saw the album's highlights as "minimal at best", and closed his review disapproving of the album's mainstream approach. In a negative review, The Guardian's Alexis Petridis showed distaste for both Nelly's vocal technique and Suit's tracks. Petridis described the album's songs as "gummy R&B ballads", while noting Nelly's egotism to overtake his abilities as an artist. Suit was nominated for a Grammy Award for Best Rap Album at the 47th Grammy Awards, losing to Kanye West's The College Dropout.

== Commercial performance ==
In its opening week, Suit debuted atop the US Billboard 200 chart, selling 396,000 copies, becoming Nelly's third consecutive US number-one album following Country Grammar (2000) and Nellyville (2002). On the same day of Suit's release, Nelly's Sweat, released in conjunction with the former album, debuted at number 2 on the Billboard 200, selling 342,000 copies. The combination of both album's opening figures of 737,000 surpasses that of Nellyville's, which debuted with 714,000 copies sold. With the debuts, Nelly became the first act to achieve the feat of obtaining album's number one and number 2 on the US Top R&B/Hip Hop Albums chart simultaneously. He is the second artist, following American hard rock band Guns N' Roses, to achieve the same feat but on the Billboard 200 chart. Guns N' Roses attained the accomplishment in 1991 with Use Your Illusion II and Use Your Illusion I, with the former debuting at number one and the latter at number 2, selling 770,000 and 685,000 copies, respectively. The following week of Suit's release, it fell to number 2 on the Billboard 200 chart, selling 160,000 copies, being replaced by Green Day's American Idiot (2004). In its third week, Suit sold 118,000 copies, dropping to number 5. In the album's fourth week of release, its sales increased to 122,000 copies, the only album of the week to have its sales rise; it sustained its position at number 5. In its fifth week, Suit's sales further increased to 144,000 units, gaining the title of Greatest Gainer, and rising from number 5 to number 3 on the chart. The album's sales continued to increase in its sixth week of release, selling 153,000 copies, moving from number 3 to number 2. It had passed one million copies in sales in the US that week. On November 1, 2004, Suit went on to be certified gold by the Recording Industry Association of America (RIAA), denoting shipments of 500,000 copies. On January 19, 2005, the album was certified three times platinum by the RIAA, for shipments of three million copies.

On the Canadian Albums Chart, Suit debuted at number one, becoming Nelly's first album to top the chart in the country. The album debuted at number 6 on the New Zealand Albums Chart on the week of September 20, 2004, remaining at number 6 for two weeks, and dropping out of the chart after thirteen weeks. On the Australian Albums Chart, Suit reached at number 7, remaining on the chart for five weeks. Along with Sweat, Suit is Nelly's third consecutive album to peak within the top ten of the latter three charts. The album has been certified gold by the Australian Recording Industry Association (ARIA) and Recorded Music NZ, for shipments of 35,000 and 7,500 copies, respectively. The album reached the top ten on the UK Albums Chart and German Albums Chart, at number 8. It has been certified platinum by the British Phonographic Industry (BPI), for shipments of 300,000 copies, on May 20, 2005. Suit peaked at number 11 on the Swiss Albums Chart on the week of September 26, 2004, dropping off the chart after eight weeks. It remained on the Dutch Albums Chart for seven weeks, debuting and peaking at number 17. The album was less successful in other territories, charting within the top thirty on the Austrian Albums Chart and Norwegian Albums Chart at number 29. Suit reached at number 34 on the Swedish Albums Chart, number 43 on the Belgian Albums Chart (Flanders) and number 72 on the French Albums Chart. The album's lowest charting position was on the Belgian Albums Chart (Wallonia), at number 83. It remained on it for three weeks.

== Track listing ==
Suit track listing
No.	Title	Writer(s)	Producer(s)	Length
1.	"Play It Off" (featuring Pharrell)	Cornell Haynes, Jr.; Chad Hugo; Pharrell Williams	The Neptunes	3:47
2.	"Pretty Toes" (featuring Jazze Pha and T.I.)	Haynes, Jr.; Phalon Alexander; André Benjamin; Patrick Brown; Clifford Harris, Jr.; Raymond "Yoda" Murray; Antwan Patton; Rico Wade	Jazze Pha	4:28
3.	"My Place" (featuring Jaheim)	Haynes, Jr.; Eldra DeBarge; Etterlene Jordan; Kenneth Gamble; Leon Huff; Randy Edelman; William DeBarge; Jaheim Hoagland; Dorian "Doe" Moore	Doe	5:36
4.	"Paradise"	Haynes, Jr.; Moore; Ahmed "AHM" Oliver	Doe; AHM	4:36
5.	"She Don't Know My Name" (featuring Snoop Dogg and Ronald Isley)	Haynes, Jr.; Calvin Broadus, Jr.; Ronald Isley; Antwan Patton; Nsilo Reddick; Nicholas Sherwood	Big Boi; the Beat Bullies	4:26
6.	"'N' Dey Say"	Haynes, Jr.; Jayson "Koko" Bridges; Gary Kemp	Bridges	3:37
7.	"Woodgrain and Leather wit a Hole"	Haynes, Jr.; Bridges	Bridges	5:13
8.	"In My Life" (featuring Avery Storm and Mase)	Haynes, Jr.; Ralph Stasio; Mason Betha; Earl Gaynor; Robert Gerongco; Samual Gerongco	Kuya Productions	3:40
9.	"Over and Over" (featuring Tim McGraw)	Haynes, Jr.; Bridges; James Hargrove; Samuel McGraw	Bridges	4:14
10.	"Nobody Knows" (featuring Anthony Hamilton)	Haynes, Jr.; Jermaine Mauldin; Anthony Hamilton; James Phillips	Jermaine Dupri	4:39
11.	"Die for You"	Haynes, Jr.; Karlin; Soulshock	Soulshock & Karlin	4:28
Total length:				48:43

United Kingdom bonus tracks
No.	Title	Writer(s)	Producer(s)	Length
12.	"Ride wit Me (Remix)" (featuring City Spud)	Haynes, Jr.; Jason "Jay E" Epperson	Epperson	4:05
13.	"Dilemma (Remix)" (featuring Kelly Rowland and Ali)	Haynes, Jr.; Kelendria Rowland; Dupri; Patricia Holte; Ali Jones	Ryan Bowser	4:38
Total length:				57:26

Notes

- "My Place" contains a portion of composition from "Isn't It a Shame" by girl group Labelle and Randy DeBarge's 1982 "I Like It". It samples elements of "Come Go With Me" by Teddy Pendergrass.
- "'N' Dey Say" samples Spandau Ballet’s 1983 "True".

== Personnel ==
Credits adapted from AllMusic.

- Ahm – producer
- Avery Storm – main personnel, primary artist, vocoder
- The Beat Bullies – producer
- Big Boi – producer
- Matt Brauss – bass
- Jayson Bridges – drums, keyboards, percussion, producer
- Sandy Brummels – art direction
- Chris Carmouche – engineer
- Andrew Coleman – audio engineer, engineer
- Jermaine Dupri – producer
- Michael Eleopoulos – assistant
- Brian Frye – engineer
- Richard "Rip" Gager – guitar
- Earl Gaynor – producer
- Chris Gehringer – mastering
- Robert Gerongco – producer
- Sam Gerongco – producer
- Anthony Hamilton – guest artist, main personnel, primary artist, vocals
- James D. "Sted Fast" II Hargrove – guitar, producer
- John Horesco IV – assistant
- Ronald Isley – main personnel, primary artist, vocals
- Jaheim – guest artist, main personnel, primary artist, rap
- Jazze Pha – audio production, main personnel, primary artist, producer, rap, various instruments
- Kim Moore Johnson – vocals (background)
- Rajinder Kala – congas
- Karlin – producer
- Chip Karpells – assistant, assistant engineer, mixing assistant
- Debra Killings – bass
- Kuya Brothers – producer
- Kevin Law – engineer
- Bryan Loss – drums
- LROC – producer
- Dan "Thunda Dan" Marshal – engineer, guitar
- Mase – guest artist, main personnel, primary artist, rap
- Brandon "B Don" Matthews – engineer
- Tim McGraw – guest artist, main personnel, primary artist, vocals
- Tadd Mingo – assistant
- Carl Nappa – audio engineer, engineer
- Nelly – executive producer, main personnel, primary artist, rap
- The Neptunes – audio production, producer
- Jared Nugent – assistant, assistant engineer
- Onion – guitar
- Shorty B. – bass, guitar
- Snoop Dogg – guest artist, main personnel, primary artist, rap
- Soulshock – producer
- Joe Spix – art direction, design
- T.I. – guest artist, main personnel, primary artist, rap
- Phil Tan – mixing
- Richard Travali – mixing
- Serge Tsai – engineer
- James White – photography
- Pharrell Williams – main personnel, primary artist, vocals

== Charts ==
=== Weekly charts ===
Weekly chart performance for Suit
Chart (2004–2005)	Peak position
Australian Albums (ARIA)	7
Australian Urban Albums (ARIA)	2
Austrian Albums (Ö3 Austria)	29
Belgian Albums (Ultratop Flanders)	43
Belgian Albums (Ultratop Wallonia)	83
Canadian Albums (Billboard)	1
Canadian R&B Albums (Nielsen SoundScan)	1
Dutch Albums (Album Top 100)	17
French Albums (SNEP)	72
German Albums (Offizielle Top 100)	8
Irish Albums (IRMA)	21
Italian Albums (FIMI)	37
Japanese Albums (Oricon)	28
New Zealand Albums (RMNZ)	6
Norwegian Albums (VG-lista)	29
Scottish Albums (Official Charts)	19
South African Albums (RISA)	8
Swedish Albums (Sverigetopplistan)	34
Swiss Albums (Schweizer Hitparade)	11
UK Albums (Official Charts)	8
UK R&B Albums (Official Charts)	1
US Billboard 200	1
US Top R&B/Hip-Hop Albums (Billboard)	1
US Top Rap Albums (Billboard)	1

=== Year-end charts ===
2004 year-end chart performance for Suit
Chart (2004)	Position
UK Albums (OCC)	167
US Billboard 200	39
US Top R&B/Hip-Hop Albums (Billboard)	30
Worldwide Albums (IFPI)	16

2005 year-end chart performance for Suit
Chart (2005)	Position
US Billboard 200	33
US Top R&B/Hip-Hop Albums (Billboard)	31

== Certifications ==
Certifications for Suit
Region	Certification	Certified units/sales
Australia (ARIA)	Gold	35,000^{^}
New Zealand (RMNZ)	Platinum	15,000^{‡}
United Kingdom (BPI)	Platinum	300,000^{^}
United States (RIAA)	3× Platinum	3,000,000^{^}
^{^} Shipments figures based on certification alone.^{‡} Sales+streaming figures based on certification alone.

== Release history ==
Release history and formats for Suit
Country	Date	Format(s)	Label	Edition(s)
United Kingdom	September 13, 2004	CD, digital download	Universal Records	Standard
Germany	September 13, 2004	CD, digital download	Universal Records	Standard
United States	September 14, 2004	CD, digital download	Universal Records	Standard
Canada	September 14, 2004	CD, digital download	Universal Records	Standard
Japan	September 14, 2004	CD, digital download	Universal Records	Standard

== See also ==
- List of number-one albums of 2004 (U.S.)
- List of number-one R&B albums of 2004 (U.S.)
- List of number-one albums of 2004 (Canada)
