= Spit Your Game =

2006 single by The Notorious B.I.G.

Single by The Notorious B.I.G. featuring Twista, Bone Thugs-n-Harmony and 8Ball & MJG

from the album Duets: The Final Chapter
- Released: February 24, 2006
- Genre: Hip hop
- Length: 4:09
- Label: Bad Boy; Atlantic
- Songwriters: Christopher Wallace; Sean Combs; Steven Jordan; Anthony Henderson; Bryon McCane; Joey Brooks; Stephen Howse; Carl Mitchell
- Producer: Swizz Beatz

The Notorious B.I.G. singles chronology
| "Nasty Girl" (2005) | "Spit Your Game" (2006) | "Old Thing Back" (2015) |

Twista singles chronology
| "So Lonely" (2005) | "Spit Your Game" (2006) | "Impossible" (2006) |

8Ball & MJG singles chronology
| "Ridin High" (2006) | "Spit Your Game" (2006) | "Clap On" (2007) |

"Spit Your Game" is the second single by Notorious B.I.G. from his Duets: The Final Chapter album, a remixed album of Biggie Smalls' work. The song features guest appearances from Bone Thugs-n-Harmony's Krayzie Bone and Twista and sampled The Walker Brothers' "My Ship Is Coming In" from their Take It Easy with the Walker Brothers album. The single is a double A-side with "Hold Ya Head", a song which samples "Johnny Was" from Bob Marley's Rastaman Vibration album by his reggae band The Wailers and "Suicidal Thoughts" from Biggie's Ready to Die for his vocals.

The single was released on 24 April in the UK and reached No. 64 on the UK charts.

It is a modern rendition of Notorious B.I.G.'s and Bone Thugs-n-Harmony's acclaimed collaboration on the song "Notorious Thugs". In "Notorious Thugs", Biggie changed his normally smooth flow to a faster melodic pace to emulate Bone's trademark flow and "Spit Your Game" references this by including two fast verses by Twista and Krayzie Bone.

== Video ==
The video for "Spit Your Game" features Layzie Bone, Wish Bone, Krayzie Bone, Twista, Cheri Dennis, Eightball & MJG and Swizz Beatz. It is set in a recording studio as a "Battle for the Krown" is taking place.

On the airing of MTV's Making the Video episode for "Spit Your Game", it was announced that this will be the last video ever to be in dedication of The Notorious B.I.G. Yung Joc, Jody Breeze, Big Gee, Layzie Bone, Wish Bone, Swizz Beatz and Sleepy Brown made an appearance in the video. It was directed by Dr. Teeth.

== Remixes ==
"Spit Your Game" is a remix of "Notorious Thugs", a Notorious B.I.G. and Bone Thugs-n-Harmony duet on Biggie's second album Life After Death.

The song also features a remixed version, where 8Ball & MJG spit a verse each towards the end of the song, though their verses have been much criticized for not keeping in context with fast rapping and doing basic slow verses.

== Track listing ==
=== UK - CD: 1 ===
1. Spit Your Game [Remix Edit] (Featuring Twista, Eightball & MJG & Krayzie Bone)
2. Hold Ya Head [Main Version] (Featuring Bob Marley)

=== UK - CD: 2 ===
1. Spit Your Game [Remix] (Featuring Twista, Eightball & MJG & Bone Thugs-N-Harmony)
2. Hold Ya Head [Main Version] (Featuring Bob Marley)
3. Spit Your Game [MyTone - Personalized Ringtone]

=== UK - 12" vinyl ===
1. Spit Your Game [Remix] (Featuring Twista, Eightball & MJG & Bone Thugs-N-Harmony)
2. Spit Your Game [Instrumental Remix]
3. Hold Ya Head [Main Version] (Featuring Bob Marley)
4. Hold Ya Head [Instrumental]

=== Promo CD ===
1. Spit Your Game [Remix Edit] (Featuring Twista, Eightball & MJG & Bone Thugs-N-Harmony)
2. Spit Your Game [Remix Instrumental]
3. Hold Ya Head [Amended Album Version] (Featuring Bob Marley)
4. Hold Ya Head [Instrumental]

== Charts ==
| Chart (2006) | Peak position |
|---|---|
| Finland (Suomen virallinen lista) | 7 |
| Ireland (IRMA) | 47 |
| Switzerland (Schweizer Hitparade) | 76 |
| UK Singles (Official Charts) | 64 |
| US Hot R&B/Hip-Hop Songs (Billboard) | 68 |
