= Cindy Gallop =

English advertising consultant

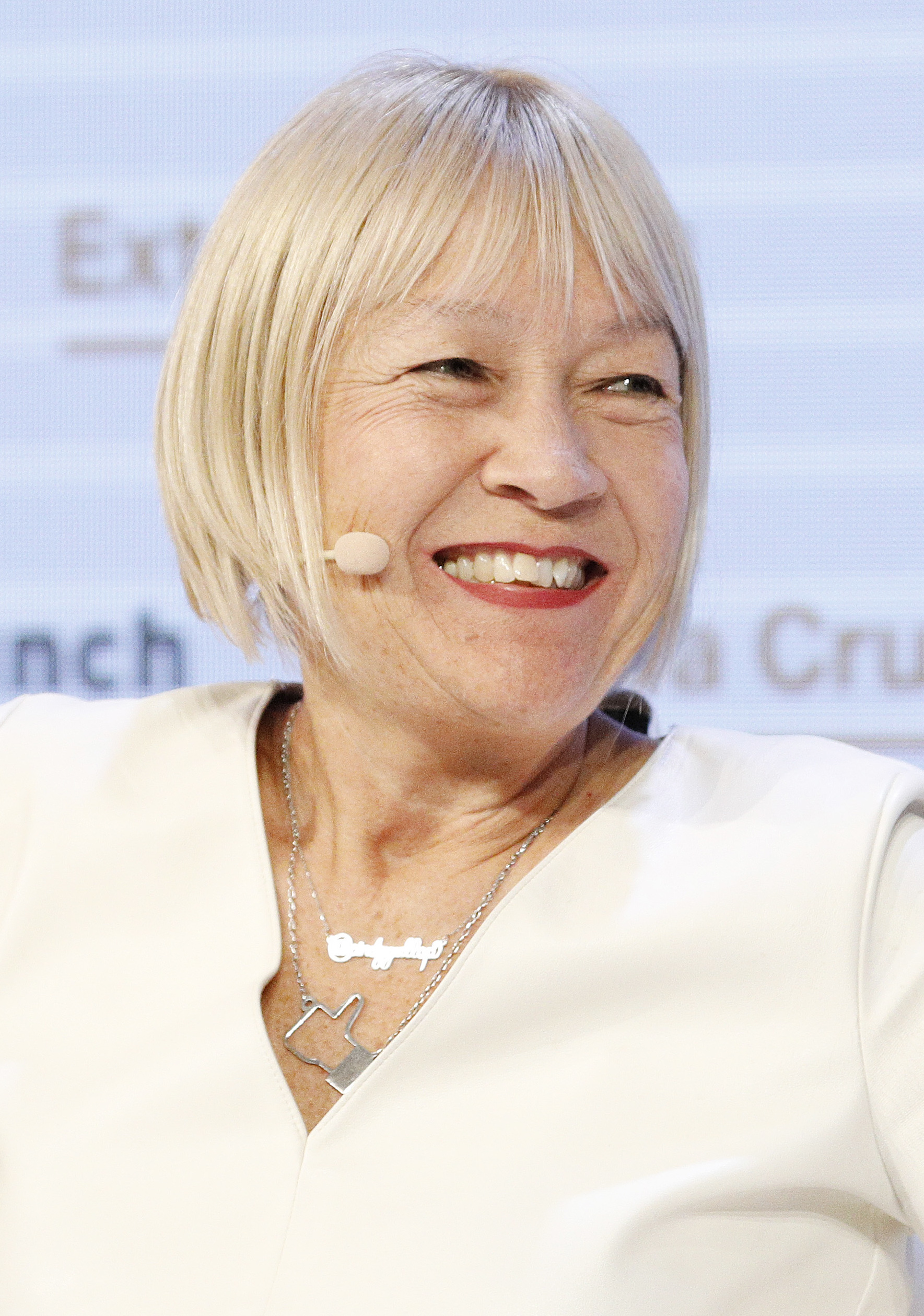
- Gallop in 2019
- Born: Lucinda Lee Gallop; 1 February 1960 (age 66); Amersham, Buckinghamshire, England
- Occupations: CEO and advertising executive
- Known for: Founder of MakeLoveNotPorn and IfWeRanTheWorld

Lucinda Lee Gallop (born 1 February 1960) is an English advertising consultant, founder and former chair of the US branch of advertising firm Bartle Bogle Hegarty, and founder of the IfWeRanTheWorld and MakeLoveNotPorn companies. According to the TED blog, Gallop's TEDTalk "Make Love Not Porn" was one of the "most talked about presentations" at the 2009 TED conference. She lives in New York City.

== Early life ==
Cindy Gallop was born in Amersham, Buckinghamshire, and grew up in Brunei. She is of half English, half Chinese descent. Gallop's father is English and her mother Malaysian Chinese, from Alor Star in Kedah. Her parents live in Penang, where she returns regularly.

Gallop studied English literature at Somerville College, Oxford University, receiving an MA in English language and literature, followed by an MA from Warwick University in theatre of the European Renaissance.

== Career ==
Gallop worked as a theatre publicist and marketer in England for several years before switching careers to advertising. She joined the London office of British advertising firm Bartle Bogle Hegarty in 1989 and was responsible for large accounts like Coca-Cola, Ray-Ban, and Polaroid. In 1996, she helped start the Asia Pacific branch of BBH. She founded the US branch of BBH in 1998 and served as chair of the board. In 2003, Gallop won the Advertising Woman of the Year award from Advertising Women of New York. She founded her own brand and business innovation consultancy, Cindy Gallop LLC, in 2006. She is known for her tagline: "I like to blow shit up. I am the Michael Bay of business."

At the 2009 TED conference, Gallop launched the MakeLoveNotPorn web site in a 4-minute TEDTalk that the TED blog described as "one of the event's most talked about." The goal of MakeLoveNotPorn is to provide a platform for people to post real-world sex videos. She later published a TED book, Make Love Not Porn: Technology's Hardcore Impact on Human Behavior. MakeLoveNotPorn.TV launched in August 2012, a video sharing site designed "to make #realworldsex socially acceptable and socially shareable." Gallop stated previously that she also bought the domain MakeLoveNotPorn.Academy and that she hopes to raise enough money to turn the website into the "Khan Academy of sex education"

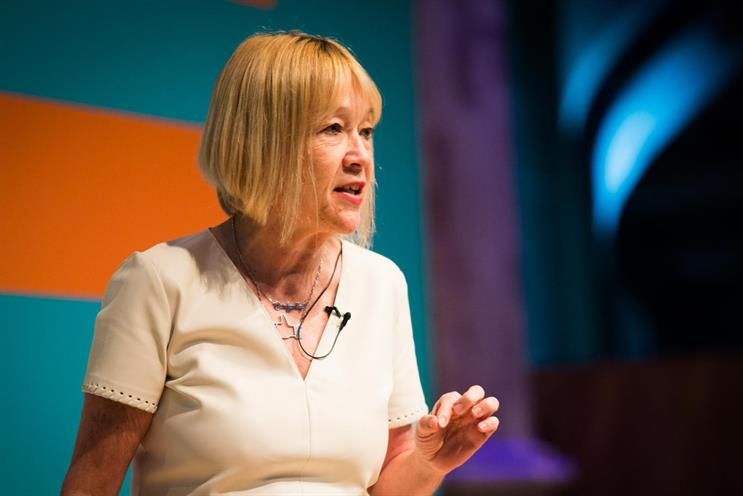
Cindy Gallop speaking at Horasis China Meeting 2019 in Las Vegas, Nevada.

In January 2010, Gallop launched IfWeRanTheWorld, a web platform designed to turn good intentions into action, by allowing people, brands, and companies to easily perform, trade, and co-ordinate "microactions." One client of IfWeRanTheWorld is Levi's, who worked with IfWeRanTheWorld to create a campaign to revitalise the manufacturing town of Braddock, Pennsylvania. Gallop is a professional public speaker in the areas of advertising, branding, and business strategy and has spoken at TED, SXSW, the Association of National Advertisers conference, Web 2.0, ad:tech, and other conferences.

== The black apartment ==
Gallop's unique black-themed New York apartment, designed by The Apartment creative agency, was a set for The Notorious B.I.G.'s music video "Nasty Girl." Her apartment has been profiled by Dwell, Apartment Therapy.com, The Atlantic, The Selby and New York magazine, among many others.
