= Nasty Girl (The Notorious B.I.G. song) =

2005 single by The Notorious B.I.G.

Single by The Notorious B.I.G. featuring Diddy, Nelly, Jagged Edge and Avery Storm

from the album Duets: The Final Chapter and Sweatsuit
- Released: October 11, 2005
- Genre: Dirty rap
- Length: 4:57
- Label: Bad Boy; Atlantic
- Songwriters: Angela Stone; Anton Phalon; Brandon Casey; Brian Casey; Calvin Broadus; Christopher Wallace; Cornell Haynes; Eldra DeBarge; Harold Lilly; John Taylor; Joyce Sims; Leroy Watson; Nick Rhodes; Ralph Distacio; Sean Combs; Simon Le Bon; Steve Jordan
- Producer: Jazze Pha

The Notorious B.I.G. singles chronology
| "Runnin' (Dying to Live)" (2003) | "Nasty Girl" (2005) | "Spit Your Game" (2006) |

P. Diddy singles chronology
| "What You Been Drankin' On?" (2005) | "Nasty Girl" (2005) | "Come to Me" (2006) |

Nelly singles chronology
| "Grillz" (2005) | "Nasty Girl" (2005) | "Call on Me" (2006) |

Jagged Edge singles chronology
| "So Amazing" (2005) | "Nasty Girl" (2005) | "Good Luck Charm" (2006) |

Avery Storm singles chronology
| "Nasty Girl" (2005) | "Stop Time" (2007) |

"Nasty Girl" is a song by American rapper The Notorious B.I.G., released on October 11, 2005. The song features guest appearances from Jagged Edge, P. Diddy, Avery Storm, and Nelly, and the video also contains guest appearances from Pharrell, Usher, Fat Joe, 8Ball & MJG, Teairra Mari, Jazze Pha, DJ Green Lantern, Naomi Campbell and Memphis Bleek. It can be found on the album Duets: The Final Chapter (2005), a remixed album of Biggie Smalls' work. The single reached number one in the United Kingdom and became a top-10 hit in Finland, Germany, Ireland, and New Zealand.

== Background ==
A slightly different version of the single also appeared on Nelly's Sweatsuit album. "Nasty Girl" was used as the opening theme for Germany's Next Topmodel, Cycle 1.

The lyrical section rapped by Notorious B.I.G. is actually lifted from another of his songs called "Nasty Boy", featured on his second album Life After Death. Despite this, the production to the song "Nasty Boy" is completely different from that for "Nasty Girl", and apart from the lyrical sample, and the second verse (rapped by P. Diddy) rapped in the style of Biggie's second verse of Nasty Boy, the two songs bear no similarities. The chorus, sung by Jagged Edge, which has the line "Grab your titties for B.I.G.", references "Player's Anthem", which he says "Bitches, rub your titties if you love Big Poppa".

== Music video ==
"Nasty Girl" has a music video, featuring the song's featured artists mentioned above. It was produced by Jazze Pha, set in a party to honor the Notorious B.I.G. It was shot in the black themed apartment of Cindy Gallop. It includes clips of Smalls in the beginning and end of the video (the first showing Biggie and Tupac Shakur as friends before the rivalry). Just before Nelly's verse, Naomi Campbell makes a memorable entrance into the video, slapping a man in the process, when the man asks "Aren't you one of those Top Model girls?" The man is thought to represent Damon Dash because he's wearing a cap with the State Property logo on it. Dash was part owner of the State Property brand, and was frequently seen wearing caps with the logo. This episode may have been in retaliation for the movie Death of a Dynasty, which was produced and directed by Dash, and in which Diddy was portrayed in a farcical manner.

Usher, DJ Green Lantern, Evan Ross, Christina Milian, Pharrell Williams, Teairra Mari, 8Ball & MJG, Corey Clark, Fat Joe and Jazze Pha made cameos.

== Track listings ==
UK CD single 1

1. "Nasty Girl" (Main version) (featuring Diddy, Nelly, Jagged Edge and Avery Storm)
2. "Mo Money Mo Problems" (featuring Puff Daddy and Mase)

UK CD single 2

1. "Nasty Girl" (Main version) (featuring Diddy, Nelly, Jagged Edge and Avery Storm)
2. "Hold Ya Head" (featuring Bob Marley)
3. "Nasty Girl" (MyTone - Personalized Ringtone)
4. "Hold Ya Head" (MyTone - Personalized Ringtone)

UK 12-inch vinyl single

1. "Nasty Girl" (Main version) (featuring Diddy, Nelly, Jagged Edge and Avery Storm)
2. "Nasty Girl" (Instrumental)
3. "Hold Ya Head" (featuring Bob Marley)
4. "Mo Money Mo Problems" (featuring Puff Daddy and Mase)

Australian CD single

1. "Nasty Girl" (Main version) (featuring Diddy, Nelly, Jagged Edge and Avery Storm)
2. "Mo Money Mo Problems" (featuring Puff Daddy and Mase)
3. "Hold Ya Head" (featuring Bob Marley)

== Charts ==
=== Weekly charts ===
| Chart (2005–2006) | Peak position |
|---|---|
| Australia (ARIA) | 15 |
| Australian Urban (ARIA) | 4 |
| Austria (Ö3 Austria Top 40) | 23 |
| Belgium (Ultratop 50 Flanders) | 28 |
| Belgium (Ultratop 50 Wallonia) | 25 |
| Europe (Eurochart Hot 100) | 1 |
| Finland (Suomen virallinen lista) | 10 |
| France (SNEP) | 22 |
| Germany (GfK) | 8 |
| Greece (IFPI) | 21 |
| Ireland (IRMA) | 5 |
| Netherlands (Dutch Top 40) | 28 |
| Netherlands (Single Top 100) | 22 |
| New Zealand (Recorded Music NZ) | 7 |
| Scottish Singles Sales (Official Charts) | 2 |
| Sweden (Sverigetopplistan) | 40 |
| Switzerland (Schweizer Hitparade) | 14 |
| UK Singles (Official Charts) | 1 |
| UK Hip Hop/R&B (Official Charts) | 1 |
| US Billboard Hot 100 | 44 |
| US Hot R&B/Hip-Hop Songs (Billboard) | 20 |
| US Hot Rap Songs (Billboard) | 9 |
| US Pop Airplay (Billboard) | 37 |
| US Rhythmic Airplay (Billboard) | 23 |

=== Year-end charts ===
| Chart (2006) | Position |
|---|---|
| Australia (ARIA) | 65 |
| Australian Urban (ARIA) | 19 |
| Europe (Eurochart Hot 100) | 25 |
| Germany (Media Control GfK) | 58 |
| Switzerland (Schweizer Hitparade) | 90 |
| UK Singles (OCC) | 13 |
| UK Urban (Music Week) "Nasty Girl" / "Spit Your Game" | 6 |
| US Hot R&B/Hip-Hop Songs (Billboard) | 96 |

== Certifications ==
| Region | Certification | Certified units/sales |
|---|---|---|
| New Zealand (RMNZ) | 2× Platinum | 60,000^{‡} |
| United Kingdom (BPI) | 2× Platinum | 1,200,000^{‡} |
| United States (RIAA) Digital | Gold | 500,000^{‡} |
| United States (RIAA) Mastertone | Gold | 500,000^{*} |
^{*} Sales figures based on certification alone.^{‡} Sales+streaming figures based on certification alone.

== Release history ==
| Region | Date | Format(s) | Label(s) | Ref. |
|---|---|---|---|---|
| United Kingdom | October 11, 2005 | Digital EP | Bad Boy Entertainment | |
| United States | November 21, 2005 | Rhythmic contemporary; urban radio | Bad Boy Entertainment | |
| United Kingdom | January 16, 2006 | CD | Bad Boy Entertainment | |
| Australia | February 13, 2006 | CD | Bad Boy Entertainment | |
