= Serius Jones =

American rapper

Serius Jonesss
- Also known as: Serius Jones
- Born: Saleem Bligen; December 25, 1984 (age 41); Englewood, New Jersey
- Genres: Hip-Hop, Battle Rap
- Occupations: Rapper, songwriter
- Years active: 2005–present
- Labels: Disturbing tha Peace, Jersey Mint
- Website: getserius.com

Saleem Bligen, known professionally as Serius Jones, is an American rapper from New Jersey who performs freestyle battles. Jones won 12 consecutive battles at New York's Monday Night Fight Klub before facing and beating former Fight Klub King Jin The MC to become MTV's all-time Fight Klub Champion. Jones independently released King Me in 2006, followed by Serius Bizness in 2008 and Why So Serius? in 2009.

== Name ==
Jones chose the name "Serius" from a book on Egyptian phenomena, the star Sirius was extremely important to the Egyptians, lining up with the Pyramid of Giza.

== Career ==
=== Battle rap career ===
His battles include Jones vs. Jin, Jones vs. Big Ace, which both appeared on MTV 2's Fight Klub, and also Jones vs. Murda Mook which appeared on a SMACK DVD, and also received over one million views youtube.com, Vlad TV, World Star and Hip Hop.com.

=== Deal with Disturbing Tha Peace Records ===
Serius Jones signed a record deal with rapper Ludacris's Disturbing tha Peace record label in 2006 but 18 months later Serius and DTP parted ways. Serius stated,

The hospitality in the beginning was really there. But I think after a while people just got annoyed of me, and sick of me. It's like, this gotdamn Serius Jones guy. He keeps going. He's not stopping and just settling in like everybody else. And it's like, no muthafucka I'm not stopping and allowing myself to be [content] with riding in the fuckin promo van. Like, nah B, this is rap star shit. Cause if it ain't, and if you ain't no fuckin rap star, you just some other little dusty rap nigga with a chain trying to be noticed. And that ain't never been my style. It's all love though, on my end, he said. I don't have nothing but good wishes for them. I wish them all the best. In terms of being people, in terms of character, I don't think they had any malice towards me. But it's a business.

=== Life is Serius ===
Between 2006 and 2010, Jones produced and starred in a short autobiography film entitled Life is Serius, directed by Independent Filmmaker/Producer Winfield Ezell, Jr. Jones also put out nearly 50 records, 100 music videos, short films, comedy sketches and an animated series "Day In The life". Jones headlined a tour through Europe while filming a documentary of the experience entitled "The Euro Tour" and recording an album of the same name, including 2 music videos filmed in Rome.

=== 2011-present: Offer From Luxe Society Records, Living Legend and Legendary ===
Jones released Serius Business 2 on Thanksgiving in 2011. The EP features appearances by 2 Chainz, Gucci Mane, T-Pain, Bobby V, Sam Scarfo, and Jay Rock.

After a return to battle rap, Serius Jones released his mixtape Living Legend on February 18, 2014, and follow up with his Legendary album in April of the same year.

== Arrest ==
Jones was convicted and sentenced to three years for pimping, dissuading a witness, and other charges in October 2020.

== Discography ==
=== Studio albums ===
- Truth Be Told (2007)
- King Me (2010)

=== Mixtapes ===
- Serius Bizness (2005)
- Why So Serius? (2006)
- Serius Bizness 2 (2008)

=== Singles ===
- "Tryna Get Paid"
- "Love Me or Hate Me"
- "Get It Poppin"

=== Singles ===
Title	Year
"Y.N.B. (Boomin)"	2017
"Money Love"	2019
"Homecoming"	2023
"All Timing"	2024
"Flygierian"	2024

== Videography ==
- Serius Jones Presents Life is Serius (2012)
