= Avery Storm =

American singer (born 1976)

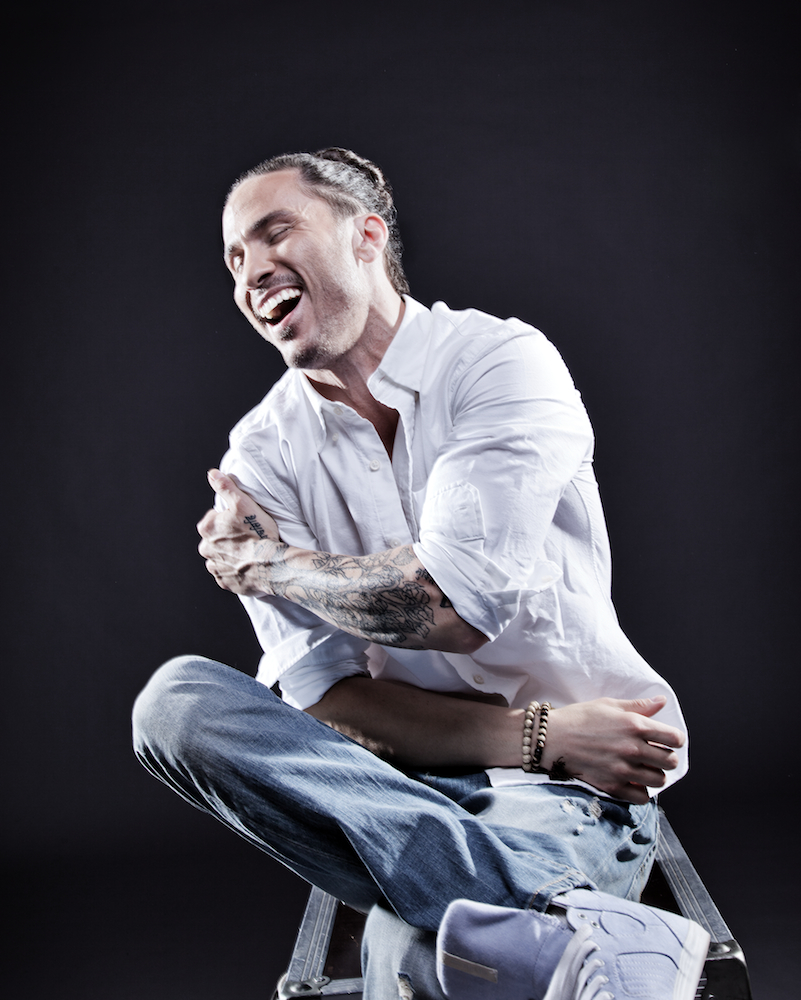
- Avery Storm in 2012 by Frank Hendler

Background information
- Born: Ralph Di Stasio; December 5, 1976 (age 49); Fair Lawn, New Jersey, U.S.
- Origin: New York City, U.S.
- Genres: R&B
- Occupations: Singer; songwriter
- Instrument: Vocals
- Years active: 2001–present
- Labels: Beat Club; Derrty

Ralph Di Stasio (born December 5, 1976), better known by his stage name Avery Storm, is an American singer from Fair Lawn, New Jersey. He is best known for his guest appearance alongside Nelly on Rick Ross' 2008 single "Here I Am," which peaked within the top 50 of the Billboard Hot 100. Prior, he signed with Nelly's Derrty Entertainment in 2005 and guest appeared alongside him, P. Diddy, and Jagged Edge on the Notorious B.I.G.'s posthumous single, "Nasty Girl" that same year.

== Early life ==
Di Stasio grew up in a working-class Italian-American family in New Jersey. After high school, he moved to New York City and signed to Timbaland's record label Beat Club in 2001 as "Avery Storm" after joining an independent production company.

== Career ==
In 2005, Di Stasio was signed with Nelly's record label Derrty Entertainment. The year prior, he guest performed on Nelly's album Suit.

Di Stasio has appeared on two Billboard Hot 100 entries: "Nasty Girl" by the Notorious B.I.G. in 2005, and "Here I Am" by Rick Ross in 2008; for the latter, he performed alongside label boss Nelly.

Shotgun Love was the title of Storm's planned debut album, for which he recorded 300 tracks. In 2014, he released the extended play Audiobiography; production was handled by Italian production team the Ceasars.

== Discography ==
=== Albums ===
- TBA: Shotgun Love

=== Mixtapes ===
- 2006: Volume Whatever
- 2009: Category 5
- 2010: Diary of the TakeOff (in collaboration with The HeatMakerz)

=== EPs ===
- 2014: Audiobiography (produced by The Ceasars (featuring Jadakiss, Styles P))

=== Singles ===
- 2007: "Stop Time"
- 2008: "Terrified" (featuring Jadakiss)
- 2008: "My Life" (featuring City Spud)
- 2009: "Not Like My Girl" (featuring Rick Ross)
- 2010: "Supermodel" (featuring Nelly)

=== Featured singles ===
Year	Title	Peak chart positions				Album
Year	Title	US	US R&B	US Rap	UK	Album
2005	"Nasty Girl" (The Notorious B.I.G. featuring P. Diddy, Nelly, Jagged Edge and Avery Storm)	44	20	9	1	Duets: The Final Chapter
2008	"Here I Am" (Rick Ross featuring Nelly and Avery Storm)	41	9	5	—	Trilla

=== Guest appearances ===
Year	Title	Artist(s)	Album
2003	"I Better Go"	Murphy Lee	Murphy's Law
2004	"In My Life"	Nelly, Mase	Suit
2005	"Time"	St. Lunatics	Coach Carter (soundtrack)
2005	"Tired"	Nelly	Sweatsuit
2006	"Badder Than a Mutha"	Daz Dillinger	So So Gangsta
2007	"All Night (Excuse Me)"	Ali & Gipp, Nelly, Juvenile	Kinfolk
2008	"Who Fucks wit Me"	Nelly	Brass Knuckles
2009	"I Tried"	Jadakiss	The Last Kiss
2009	"Crazy World"	DJ Green Lantern, Uncle Murda	
2009	"Rich Off Cocaine"	Rick Ross	Deeper Than Rap
2009	"Refuse to Lose"	DJ Green Lantern, dead prez, Chuck D	Pulse of the People (Turn Off the Radio Vol. 3)
2009	"Triumph"	Pitbull	Rebelution
2009	"Want You to Myself"	Murphy Lee	You See Me
2010	"The General"	Capone-N-Noreaga	The War Report 2: Report the War
2010	"The Corner"	I-20	The Sleeping Giant
2010	"I'll Be Good"	J.Y., Joel Ortiz	The Hiring Process
2010	"The Power"	Wale	More About Nothing
2010	"Fairytale"	Cam'ron, Vado	
2010	"If I Gave U 1"	Nelly	5.0
2011	"How I Fly"	Styles P	Master of Ceremonies
2013	"Whole Wide World"	Waka Flocka Flame	DuFlocka Rant: Halftime Show
