= Michael Brunnock =

Irish singer-songwriter, and musician

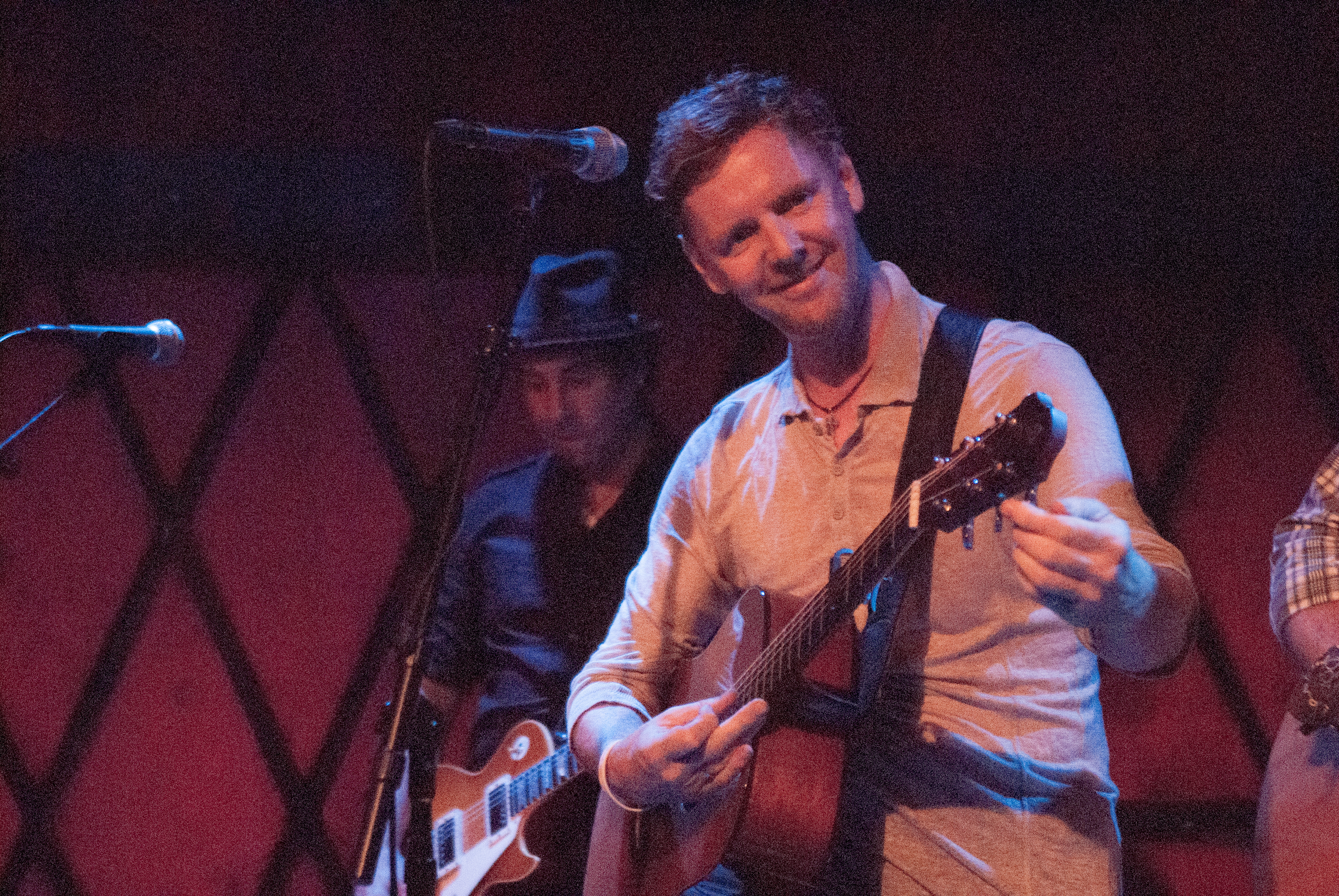

Background information
- Born: 1 September 1964 (age 61)
- Genres: Folk, Folk rock, Pop
- Occupations: Singer, songwriter
- Instruments: Guitar; vocals; Keyboards; Dulcimer
- Years active: 1996–present
- Labels: Araglin Records; Michael Brunnock
- Website: www.michaelbrunnock.com

Michael Brunnock (born 1 September 1964) is an Irish singer-songwriter, and musician. He is known as having been a member of the Irish bands Little Palace and The Van Winkles, and performed with Dead Can Dance's Brendan Perry. After moving to New York, Brunnock gained critical acclaim as a solo artist when he worked with Record producer, Pat Dillett and also The Ceasars.

He released hits in the US as a solo artist like "Fallen Leaves" in 2007 on his album So I do. He has toured extensively all over the world, joined by many popular artists. In 2012, along with David Byrne and Will Oldham, he won the David Di Donatello award 2012 in the Best Original Song category for his performance of "If it falls, it falls" in the movie This Must Be the Place directed by Paolo Sorrentino.

== Discography ==
=== So I do ===
- Fallen Leaves
- Man Overboard
- Shine
- Give
- Mis-underestimation
- Little Boy Blue
- Dance to the wind
- Born Again
- Niagara Falls
- Breast Plate
- Words
- Secret

=== The Orchard ===
- Circle
- Soft White and Indigo
- Man Overboard
- The Orchard
- Untouchable
- Song of the Lark
- Change
- Every Step
- Wine
- Hansel
- Game Changer
- Sensation
- Down by the Araglin

=== Live in New York ===
- Fallen Leaves
- Shine
- Give
- Misunderestimation
- Breastplate
- Dance to the Wind
- Niagara Falls
- Sensation [feat. Moe Holmes]
- Born Again
- Exit Strategy
- Wounded Knee
- Words

=== 2013 ===
- Red Line- (Michael Brunnock and The Ceasars)

=== 2014 ===
- Peaches and Cream - (Michael Brunnock and The Ceasars)

=== 2016 ===
- The Landing
- The Ghost of Roger Casement
