= Sweat (Nelly album) =

Studio album by Nelly
- Released: September 13, 2004
- Recorded: 2003–2004
- Genres: Hip hop; R&B
- Length: 57:53
- Labels: Derrty; Fo' Reel; Universal
- Producers: Phil Duckett; Jazze Pha; The Neptunes; T-Mix; Doe; Jason "Jay E" Epperson; Midi Mafia; Jayson "Koko" Bridges; The Alchemist; Trife

Nelly chronology
Nellyville (2002)	Sweat (2004)	Suit (2004)

Singles from Sweat
- 1. "Flap Your Wings" Released: July 17, 2004; 2. "Tilt Ya Head Back" Released: September 15, 2004; 3. "Na-NaNa-Na" Released: January 21, 2005

Sweat is the third studio album by American rapper Nelly. It was intended to be released on August 17, 2004, before being delayed and released on September 13, 2004, by his label Derrty Entertainment, Fo' Reel Entertainment, and Universal Records. Production was handled by several producers, including Jason "Jay E" Epperson, Midi Mafia, The Neptunes, Trife, Jazze Pha, Doe and the Alchemist. Released in conjunction with Suit, Nelly intended to release a single album before conceptualizing and releasing two albums simultaneously, both which would contrast each other's themes. Nelly characterized Sweat as "more up-tempo" and "energetic" while describing Suit as more of "a grown-up and sexy vibe [...] it's more melodic".

== Background ==
While recording material for his third studio album, Nelly had his intention of producing one album. Songs were being recorded at a steady pace, with Nelly composing more ideas, to which he established the idea of two albums released simultaneously to house all the tracks. On April 27, 2004, Nelly's representative initially described the upcoming albums as thematically dissimilar, "one is more melodic and party-oriented in the vein of records like "E.I." and "Tip Drill", while the other was described as having a "harder edge". The track "Another One" was allegedly a diss at fellow St. Louis rapper Chingy after the two had begun a publicized feud in the media. Nelly released singles accompanied by music videos from both albums. Talking to MTV News, Nelly described the differences between both albums; their titles of Sweat and Suit were announced on May 27, 2004. He noted Sweat as "more up-tempo" and "energetic", while characterizing Suit as more of "a grown-up and sexy vibe [...] it's more melodic".

== Release ==
Sweat and Suit were intended to be released on August 17, 2004, but were pushed back and released on September 14 in the United States, Canada and Japan. Sweat was released on September 13, 2004, in the United Kingdom and Germany.

== Critical and commercial performance ==
Professional ratings
Aggregate scores
Source	Rating
Metacritic	67/100
Review scores
Source	Rating
AllMusic	3/5 stars
Blender	4/5 stars
Entertainment Weekly	B−
Los Angeles Times	3/4 stars
NME	7/10
RapReviews	9/10
Rolling Stone	3.5/5 stars
Tom Hull – on the Web	A−
Uncut	7/10
Vibe	2.5/5 stars

In its opening week, Sweat debuted at number 2 on the US Billboard 200 chart, selling 342,000 copies. On the same day of Sweat's release, Nelly's Suit, released in conjunction with the former album, debuted at number one on the Billboard 200, selling 396,000 copies, becoming his third consecutive US number-one album following Country Grammar (2000) and Nellyville (2002). The combination of both album's opening figures of 737,000 surpasses that of Nellyville's, which debuted with 714,000 copies sold. With the debuts, Nelly became the first act to achieve the feat of obtaining album's number one and number 2 on the US Top R&B/Hip Hop Albums chart simultaneously. He is the second artist, following American hard rock band Guns N' Roses, to achieve the same feat, but on the Billboard 200 chart. Guns N' Roses attained the accomplishment in 1991 with Use Your Illusion II and Use Your Illusion I, with the former debuting at number one and the latter at number 2, selling 770,000 and 685,000 copies, respectively.

The following week of Sweat's release, it fell to number 4 on the Billboard 200 chart, selling 127,500 copies. In its third week, Sweat sold 80,000 copies, dropping to number 8. In the album's fourth week of release, its sales further decreased to 64,000 copies, falling to number 12. In its fifth week, Sweat's again decreased, to 62,000 units, sustaining its position at number 12. The album's sales continued to decrease in its sixth week of release, selling 50,000 copies, moving to number 16 on the chart. On November 1, 2004, Sweat went on to be certified platinum by the Recording Industry Association of America (RIAA), denoting shipments of 1,000,000 copies.

== Track listing ==
Sweat track listing
No.	Title	Writer(s)	Producer(s)	Length
1.	"Heart of a Champion" (featuring Lincoln University Vocal Ensemble)	Cornell Haynes, Jr.; Phillip Duckett; John Tesh	Duckett	4:29
2.	"Na-NaNa-Na" (featuring Jazze Pha)	Haynes, Jr.; Phalon Alexander; Jasper Cameron	Jazze Pha	3:59
3.	"Flap Your Wings"	Haynes, Jr.; Chad Hugo; Pharrell Williams	The Neptunes	4:03
4.	"American Dream" (featuring St. Lunatics)	Haynes, Jr.; Robert Cleveland; Torhi Harper; Ali Jones; Alexander; Bernard Edwards; Nile Rogers; Winston Rogers	T-Mix	4:56
5.	"River Don't Runnn" (featuring Murphy Lee and Stephen Marley)	Haynes, Jr.; Torhi Harper; Stephen Marley; Dorian "Doe" Moore	Doe	4:59
6.	"Tilt Ya Head Back" (featuring Christina Aguilera)	Haynes, Jr.; Moore; Tegemold Newton; Curtis Mayfield	Doe	4:13
7.	"Grand Hang Out" (featuring Fat Joe, Jung Tru and Remy Ma)	Haynes, Jr.; Jason "Jay E" Epperson; Joseph Cartagena; Reminisce Smith; Terrance "Jung Tru" Bradley	Epperson	4:49
8.	"Get'cha Get'cha" (featuring St. Lunatics)	Haynes, Jr.; Torhi Harper; Jones; Cleveland; Wayne Nugent; Kevin Risto	Midi Mafia	4:37
9.	"Another One"	Haynes, Jr.; Jayson "Koko" Bridges	Bridges	4:39
10.	"Spida Man"	Haynes, Jr.; Bridges	Bridges	4:51
11.	"Playa" (featuring Mobb Deep and Missy Elliott)	Haynes, Jr.; Alan Maman; Melissa Elliott; Albert Johnson; Kejuan Muchita; Cleveland; Lee Ryda	The Alchemist	3:57
12.	"Down in da Water" (featuring Ali and Gube Thug)	Haynes, Jr.; Jones	Trife	4:20
13.	"Boy" (featuring Lil' Flip and Big Gipp)	Haynes, Jr.; Chad Butler; Epperson; Cameron Gipp	Epperson	3:59
Total length:				57:53

United Kingdom bonus tracks
No.	Title	Writer(s)	Producer(s)	Length
14.	"Don't Stop"	Haynes, Jr.; Moore	Doe	3:57
Total length:				61:48

=== Sample credits ===
- "Heart of a Champion" – Contains a sample of "Roundball Rock" performed by John Tesh
- "Na Nana Na" – Contains a sample of "2 of Amerikaz Most Wanted" performed by 2Pac
- "American Dream" – Contains a sample of "Tired of Ballin'" performed by Tela
- "Tilt Ya Head Back" – Contains a sample of "Superfly" performed by Curtis Mayfield
- "Playa" – Contains a sample of "Magnetic Dance 2" performed by Lee Ryda

== Personnel ==
Credits adapted from AllMusic.

- Nelly – executive producer
- Jayson "Koko" Bridges – producer
- Andrew Coleman – engineer
- The Alchemist – producer
- Sandy Brummels – art direction
- Al Byno – engineer
- Jasper Cameron – producer
- Dirty Swift – producer
- Doe – producer
- Phillip Duckett – producer
- Michael Eleopoulos – assistant
- Jason "Jay E" Epperson – producer
- Loretta J. Galbreath – direction
- Chris Gehringer – mastering
- Harold Guy – assistant
- Tal Herzberg – engineer
- Jazze Pha – producer
- Jun Ishizeki – engineer
- Chip Karpells – assistant
- Kevin Law – A&R
- Marc Stephen Lee – engineer
- Jonathan Mannion – photography
- NDoffene MBodji – assistant
- Carl Nappa – engineer
- The Neptunes – producer
- Jared Nugent – assistant
- Dave Pensado – mixing
- Joe Spix – art direction, design
- T-Mix – producer
- Richard Travali – mixing
- Trife – keyboards, producer
- Bruce Waynne – producer
- James White – photography

== Chart positions ==
=== Weekly charts ===
Weekly chart performance for Sweat
Chart (2004)	Peak position
Australian Albums (ARIA)	10
Australian Urban Albums (ARIA)	3
Austrian Albums (Ö3 Austria)	35
Belgian Albums (Ultratop Flanders)	62
Canadian Albums (Billboard)	2
Canadian R&B Albums (Nielsen SoundScan)	2
Dutch Albums (Album Top 100)	28
French Albums (SNEP)	200
German Albums (Offizielle Top 100)	17
Irish Albums (IRMA)	34
Italian Albums (FIMI)	68
Japanese Albums (Oricon)	42
New Zealand Albums (RMNZ)	7
Norwegian Albums (VG-lista)	36
Scottish Albums (Official Charts)	24
Swedish Albums (Sverigetopplistan)	41
Swiss Albums (Schweizer Hitparade)	16
UK Albums (Official Charts)	11
UK R&B Albums (Official Charts)	3
US Billboard 200	2
US Top R&B/Hip-Hop Albums (Billboard)	2
US Top Rap Albums (Billboard)	2

=== Year-end charts ===
Year-end chart performance for Sweat
Chart (2004)	Position
US Billboard 200	78
US Top R&B/Hip-Hop Albums (Billboard)	51
Worldwide Albums (IFPI)	45

== Certifications ==
Certifications for Sweat
Region	Certification	Certified units/sales
Australia (ARIA)	Gold	35,000^{^}
Japan (RIAJ)	Gold	100,000^{^}
New Zealand (RMNZ)	Gold	7,500^{^}
United Kingdom (BPI)	Gold	100,000^{^}
United States (RIAA)	Platinum	1,000,000^{^}
^{^} Shipments figures based on certification alone.
