= N Dey Say =

2005 single by Nelly

Single by Nelly

from the album Suit
- B-side: "Another One"
- Released: January 24, 2005
- Studio: Derrty (Los Angeles); Basement Beats (St. Louis)
- Length: 3:37
- Label: Universal
- Composers: Nelly; Jayson Bridges; Gary Kemp
- Lyricist: Nelly
- Producer: Jayson "Koko" Bridges

Nelly singles chronology
"Na-NaNa-Na" (2005)	"N Dey Say" (2005)	"Errtime" (2005)

"N Dey Say" is a song by American rapper Nelly. It was released on January 24, 2005, as the third and final single from his album Suit (2004). The song uses a musical sample of "True" by Spandau Ballet, so songwriter Gary Kemp was given a writing credit. The song reached number 64 on the US Billboard Hot 100 and entered the top 20 in Australia, Finland, Ireland, New Zealand, and the United Kingdom.

== Music video ==
The video directed by Chris Robinson presents comparison of different lifestyles while putting an accent on their similarities (like war is equal with street gang rivalries in the civil life). It is brought into effect with a comic-like city background with strong strokes that seems like a merge of a photo and a drawing. This "in-between" feeling is realized by masking the background with a non-lifelike orange pattern. Using Bluescreen technology to separate the actors/artists from the background the performers remain realistic and stand out from the whole picture. The casting includes Gabriel Casseus (from Lockdown) as the patron of a homeless and Faune A. Chambers (from White Chicks) as the mourning widow and the St. Lunatics as cameos.

== Track listings ==
UK CD1 and Australian CD single

1. "N Dey Say" – 3:34
2. "N Dey Say" (Shake Ya Cookie remix) – 3:31
3. "N Dey Say" (Craig Groove remix) – 3:54
4. "Another One" – 4:39

UK CD2 and European CD single

1. "N Dey Say"
2. "N Dey Say" (Shake Ya Cookie remix)

UK 12-inch single

A1. "N Dey Say"
A2. "Another One"
B1. "N Dey Say" (Shake Ya Cookie remix)
B2. "N Dey Say" (Craig Groove remix)

== Credits and personnel ==
Credits are taken from the Australian CD single liner notes.

Studios

- Recorded at Derrty Studios (Los Angeles) and Basement Beats Studios (St. Louis)
- Mixed at Platinum Sound Recording (New York City)

Personnel

- Nelly – lyrics, music, vocals
- Jayson "Koko" Bridges – music, drums, production
- Gary Kemp – music
- Carl Nappa – recording
- Rich Travali – mixing
- Chip Karpells – mixing assistant

== Charts ==
=== Weekly charts ===
Chart (2005–2006)	Peak position
Australia (ARIA)	20
Australian Urban (ARIA)	10
Austria (Ö3 Austria Top 40)	41
Belgium (Ultratip Bubbling Under Flanders)	3
Belgium (Ultratip Bubbling Under Wallonia)	8
Canada CHR/Pop Top 30 (Radio & Records)	29
Czech Republic Airplay (ČNS IFPI)	34
Finland (Suomen virallinen lista)	12
Germany (GfK)	30
Hungary (Rádiós Top 40)	26
Hungary (Dance Top 40)	18
Ireland (IRMA)	11
Netherlands (Dutch Top 40 Tipparade)	3
Netherlands (Single Top 100)	80
New Zealand (Recorded Music NZ)	17
Scotland Singles (Official Charts)	11
Switzerland (Schweizer Hitparade)	23
UK Singles (Official Charts)	6
UK Hip Hop/R&B (Official Charts)	2
US Billboard Hot 100	64
US Pop Airplay (Billboard)	21
US Rhythmic Airplay (Billboard)	34

=== Year-end charts ===
Chart (2005)	Position
Australia (ARIA)	99

== Release history ==
Region	Date	Format(s)	Label(s)	Ref(s).
United States	January 24, 2005	Contemporary hit radio	Universal	
United States	February 7, 2005	Rhythmic contemporary radio	Universal	
Australia	May 30, 2005	CD	Universal	
United Kingdom	June 13, 2005	12-inch vinyl; CD	Universal	
