= Amir Issaa =

Amir
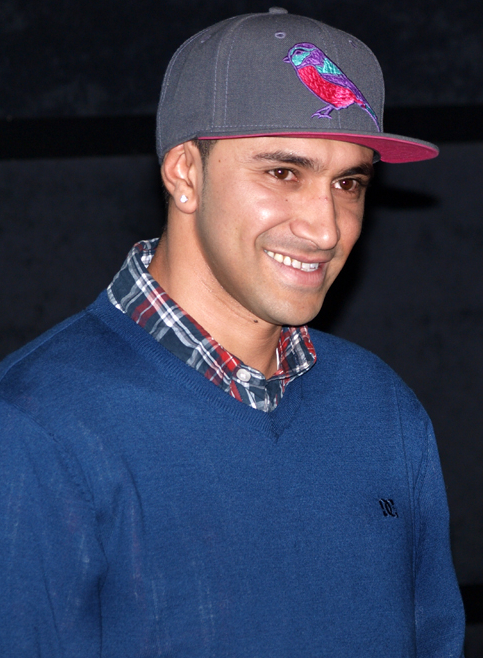
- Italian rapper

Background information
- Born: Amir Issaa; 10 December 1978 (age 47)
- Origin: Rome, Lazio, Italy
- Genres: Hip hop, pop rap
- Years active: 2000–present

Amir Issaa also known as Amir or Meticcio (born 10 December 1978) is an Italian rapper. He is called Meticcio (Mestizo) because his father is from Egypt and his mother is Italian.

== Discography ==
=== Solo career ===
==== Albums ====
- 2004 - Naturale (with Mr. Phil)
- 2006 - Uomo di prestigio - Peak - FIMI: #69
- 2007 - Vita di prestigio
- 2008 - Paura di nessuno
- 2009 - Amir 2.0
- 2010 - Pronto al peggio
- 2011 - Red Carpet Music
- 2012 - Grandezza naturale
- 2014 – Ius Music
- 2019 – Livin' Proof

==== EP ====
- 2015 – Un quarto d'ora di celebrità
- 2016 – Abracadabra (as Amir Issaa)

==== Mixtape ====
- 2006 – Prestigio Click Bang vol. 1 (with Santo Trafficante)
- 2008 – Prestigio Click Bang vol. 2 (with Santo Trafficante)
- 2010 – Radio inossidabile vol. 1
- 2011 – Radio inossidabile vol. 2
- 2015 – Radio inossidabile vol. 3

==== Singles ====
- 2006 - "Shimi"(featuring Nefer) - Peak - FIMI: #34

=== With 2 Buoni Motivi ===
- 2001 - Meglio tardi che mai

=== Collaborations ===
- 2009 - Eurostreetz Global Tactics Volume 1 - Takeover (prod. by Spintec)
- 2017 – Endi featuring Amir – Il ritratto del peccato (from Sognando ancora)
