= This Must Be the Place (film) =

2011 drama film directed by Paolo Sorrentino

- Theatrical poster
- Directed by: Paolo Sorrentino
- Screenplay by: Paolo Sorrentino; Umberto Contarello
- Story by: Paolo Sorrentino
- Produced by: Francesca Cima; Nicola Giuliano; Andrea Occhipinti
- Starring: Sean Penn; Frances McDormand
- Cinematography: Luca Bigazzi
- Edited by: Cristiano Travaglioli
- Music by: David Byrne
- Production companies: Lucky Red; Medusa Film; Indigo Film; Eurimages; Pathé
- Distributed by: Element Pictures
- Release dates: 20 May 2011 (Cannes Film Festival); 14 October 2011 (Italy); 21 March 2012 (Ireland)
- Running time: 118 minutes
- Countries: Italy; France; Ireland
- Language: English
- Budget: $28 million
- Box office: $11.6 million

This Must Be the Place is a 2011 comedy-drama film directed by Paolo Sorrentino, written by Sorrentino and Umberto Contarello and released in the United States in late 2012. It stars Sean Penn and Frances McDormand. The film deals with a middle-aged wealthy rock star who becomes bored in his retirement and takes on the quest of finding his father's tormentor, a Nazi war criminal who is a refugee in the United States.

The film was an Italian-majority production with co-producers in France and Ireland, although shot in English. Principal photography began in August, 2010. Filming took place in Ireland and Italy, as well as the states of Michigan, New Mexico, and New York. The film was in competition at the 2011 Cannes Film Festival.

== Plot ==
Cheyenne is a wealthy former rock star, now bored and jaded in his 20-year retirement in Dublin. He retired after two of his teenaged fans died by suicide. He travels to New York to reconcile with his estranged father during his final hours, but since he has a fear of flying and travels by boat he arrives too late. The reason he gives for not communicating with his father for 30 years was that his father rejected him when he put on goth make-up at the age of 15. He reads his father's diary and learns about his father's persecution in Auschwitz at the hands of former SS officer Alois Lange. He visits a professional Nazi hunter named Mordecai Midler who tells him that Lange is small fry.

Cheyenne begins a journey across the United States to track down Lange. Cheyenne finds the wife of Lange, Lange's granddaughter and a businessman. He buys a large gun. At the gun shop, a bystander delivers a soliloquy about a certain type of pistol that allows people to "kill with impunity," and given that ability, "if we’re licensed to be monsters we end up having just one desire – to truly be monsters."

When Cheyenne eventually tracks Lange down with the aid of Mordecai, Lange, now blind, says that he received mail from Cheyenne's father for decades. Lange recounts the incident that led to Cheyenne's father's obsession with Lange, in which Cheyenne's father peed his pants from fear. Lange describes this as a "minor incident" in comparison to the true horrors of Auschwitz, but mentions that he came to admire the man's single-minded determination to dedicate his life to making his own miserable. Cheyenne takes a photo of Lange and whispers that it was an injustice for his father to die before Lange did. Cheyenne forces the old blind man to walk out into the salt flats naked, like a Holocaust victim; skin and bones and numb with fear. Cheyenne and Mordecai drive away soon afterwards, leaving him still standing in the flats.

Cheyenne travels home by airplane, now free from his fear of flying. He cuts his rock-star hair and stops wearing his goth make-up, jewelry, and outfits.

== Cast ==
- Sean Penn as Cheyenne
- Frances McDormand as Jane
- Judd Hirsch as Mordecai Midler
- Eve Hewson as Mary
- Kerry Condon as Rachel
- Grant Goodman as Tommy
- Harry Dean Stanton as Robert Plath
- Joyce Van Patten as Dorothy Shore
- David Byrne as himself
- Máirín O'Donovan as Woman in Bank
- Olwen Fouéré as Mary's mother
- Shea Whigham as Ernie Ray
- Liron Levo as Richard
- Heinz Lieven as Alois Lange
- Simon Delaney as Jeffrey
- Er Li Deng as Tai Chi master
- Fritz Weaver as the voice of Cheyenne's deceased father

== Production ==
Paolo Sorrentino said Sean Penn told him he wanted to work with him after seeing Sorrentino's film Il Divo at the 2008 Cannes Film Festival, where Penn headed the jury. With Penn in mind, Sorrentino wrote the screenplay for This Must Be the Place with Umberto Contarello. Sorrentino had for a long time been fascinated by Nazi war criminals who had managed to keep their former crimes secret, and went on to live ordinary lives. To add an element of irony to a story about such a person, Sorrentino came up with Penn's character: "a slow, lazy, rock star who was bored enough and closed in his self-referential world to the point of being, seemingly, the last person who would embark on a crazy search for a Nazi criminal, probably dead by now, across the United States." Sorrentino was attracted to this juxtaposition as it would add a great risk of failure, which he considers vital for the prospect of a story to be good. In selecting the name of the rock star and his band, Sorrentino thought of what he considered the most inspired names in rock star history, Siouxsie and the Banshees, and changed it into "Cheyenne and the Fellows". The look of the character was inspired by Robert Smith of The Cure. Sorrentino had seen The Cure perform several times in his youth, and when he saw them again in 2008, he was fascinated by the fact that Smith, even off the stage, still wore the same kind of attire as in the past:

Here was a fifty-year-old who still completely identified with a look which, by definition, is that of an adolescent. But there was nothing pathetic about it. There was just this one thing that, in the movies and in life, creates an incredible feeling of wonder: the extraordinary, a unique and thrilling exception.

As soon as the screenplay was finished, Sorrentino sent it to Penn, who accepted the starring role.

This Must Be the Place was Sorrentino's first film to be shot in English. The film had a production budget of US$28 million. Production was led by the three Italian companies Indigo Film, Lucky Red and Medusa Film. Italian bank Intesa Sanpaolo invested €2.5 million ($3 million) in the film, while Eurimages provided €600,000 ($750,000) in funding. The film also received funding from France and Ireland.

Principal photography began on 16 August 2010 in Dublin, Ireland. In September, production moved to Michigan where filming took place in Bad Axe, Ubly, Kinde and Sterling Heights. Filming in New Mexico began in October and took place in Bingham, Alamogordo, Carrizozo, Eagle Nest, Red River and Questa. Post-production took place in Rome.

Original music for the film was written by David Byrne, formerly of Talking Heads. The title of the film is a tribute to the Talking Heads song "This Must Be the Place (Naive Melody)". The original songs for the film are co-written with indie singer-songwriter Will Oldham. New York-based singer songwriter Michael Brunnock sings these songs for which they won a David di Donatello award. The songs were not sung by Penn but by another character in the film.

== Release ==
This Must Be the Place premiered on May 20, 2011, in competition at the 64th Cannes Film Festival. It was additionally screened in the Spotlight section of the Sundance Film Festival in January 2012. The film made its theatrical debut in the United States on October 14, 2012.

=== Critical response ===
On Rotten Tomatoes, the film has an approval rating of 67%, based on 87 reviews, with an average rating of 6.2/10. The website's consensus reads, "This Must Be the Place may feature too many wayward detours to satisfy some passengers, but Sean Penn's beguiling performance and Paolo Sorrentino's scenic visuals make this a road trip worth following." On Metacritic, the film has a score of 61 out of 100, based on reviews from 29 critics.

Tom Keough of The Seattle Times called This Must Be the Place "an ill-conceived dramedy with a shockingly annoying performance by Sean Penn, [that] can't really figure out what kind of movie it's supposed to be." Jay Weissberg of Variety called This Must Be the Place "that rare film directed by a non-American that gets not just the locales but also the cadence of the language absolutely right, with a script full of great lines and images of lingering beauty." Regarding the acting, Weissberg wrote that "Penn's flawless performance has none of the mannered intensity that can mark his work, transcending the mask-like qualities of eyeliner and lipstick with deadpan, childlike candor."
