= Na-NaNa-Na =

Single by Nelly featuring Jazze Pha

from the album Sweat
- Released: January 21, 2005
- Genre: Hip hop
- Length: 3:59
- Label: Universal Records
- Songwriters: Haynes, Jr.; Phalon Alexander; Jasper Cameron

Nelly singles chronology
"Over and Over" (2004)	"Na-NaNa-Na" (2005)	"N Dey Say" (2005)

"Na-NaNa-Na" is a 2005 single by Nelly from his album Sweat. It features Jazze Pha. The song peaked at number 65 on the Billboard Hot R&B/Hip-Hop Songs chart. The music video for the song shows Nelly on the streets with people surrounding him as he walks back and forth in front of the camera, much like the video for "Country Grammar".

== Charts ==
Chart (2005)	Peak position
US Hot R&B/Hip-Hop Songs (Billboard)	65

== Release history ==
Region	Date	Format(s)	Label(s)	Ref.
United States	October 25, 2004	Rhythmic contemporary · urban contemporary radio	Derrty, Fo' Reel, Universal	
