= Tip drill =

Tip drill may refer to:

- Tip drill (basketball), a basketball exercise
- "Tip Drill (song)", a song by Nelly that makes reference to black American sexual slang.
- a type of small hand drill that uses very small drill bits (most smaller than 1/16")
