= Tip drill (basketball) =

Basketball exercise

A tip drill is a basketball exercise in which players take turns to tip the ball off the backboard consecutively without the ball touching the ground. After each rebound the player goes to the back of the queue leaving the next player to repeat the drill. The aim of the drill is to develop timing and jumping ability for rebounding.
