= Zainichi cinema =

Films by Koreans living in Japan

The Zainichi (Note: Japanese Koreans or Koreans in Japan) cinema refers to the transnational film industry of Japan, South and North Korea. With the main theme on the struggles or experiences faced by the resident Korean community or individuals in Japan, the Zainichi cinema is characterized by a wide range of film genres, which encompass melodramas to Yakuza films.

== Background ==
=== Earlier Zainichi-themed films ===
The earliest Japanese films featuring Koreans or resident Koreans in Japan can be traced back to the propaganda films of the early 1920s, when Korea was still under the Japanese colonial rule. During this period, Koreans in Japan were often depicted as members of the peripheral society rather than the main characters. Moreover, the film of this era exclusively tied this particular population to the two-way images of poverty and cheap laborers. For example, in films such as Look at This Mom (1930) and The Brick Factory Girl (1940), Korean laborers in Japan were primarily depicted as impoverished residents of the marginal slums where they closely lived with other poor people. Additionally, in a film titled Mr. Thank You (1936) directed by Shimizu Hiroshi, a scene, where nomadic Korean construction workers and their family move from one place to another in Japan, was inserted while highlighting the exploitive treatment of laborers from Korea.

In the postwar era, several films played an instrumental role in publicly visualizing the struggles and oppression experienced by Zainichi Koreans. In doing so, however, the Zainichi-themed films often replicated the stereotypes of Zainichi Koreans as “violent” and “criminal.” Prominently, Death by Hanging (1968) directed by Oshima Nagisa drew the struggles of a young Zainichi Korean prisoner. The main character named “R” allegedly murdered two Japanese women after raping them. Following his arrest, the trial decided that R be executed by hanging. In the film, his violence was portrayed as an explosive manifestation of his complicated identity crisis, while his delinquent past and domestic violence within his family exclusively colored the personal character of R. Other films of this era included By a Man's Face You Shall Know (1966) by Kato Tai, Three Resurrected Drunkards (1968) by Oshima Nagisa, and Empire of Kids (1981) by Izutsu Kazuyuki. These postwar films of the 20th century were generally illustrative of the struggles and difficulties faced by many Zainichi Koreans. At the same time, Zainichi characters were repeatedly represented as Yakuza members or criminals, thereby sustaining their image as violent social outcasts.

In 1975, a movie titled River of the Stranger was shot and released by director Lee Hak-in. Unlike the earlier films with the depiction of Zainichi characters, this film was the first Zainichi-themed film that was directed by a Zainichi Korean director. Subsequently, his work was followed by other Zainichi Korean film directors such as Sai Yoichi, Lee Sang-il, Yang Yong-hi, Oh Mipo, and Sugino Kiki, while Japanese directors continued to produce Zainichi-themed films.

=== Contemporary Zainichi films (1990s-Present) ===
In 1993, director Sai Yoichi released an award-winning movie titled All Under the Moon. The unveiling of this film was seen by many critics as the major transition in the existing representation of Zainichi Koreans in the film industry. Based on a novel called Taxi Crazy Rapsody, the story unfolds when a Zainichi taxi driver, Tadao, fell in love with a Filipino bartender. The melodramatic portrayal of Zainichi characters was unconventional in that it broke the recurring representation of Zainichi Koreans as Yakuza members or violent criminals.

Since 2000, many Zainichi-themed films such as Go (2001), Blood and Bones (2004), Break Through! (2005) have been released. In comparison to the limited availability and representation in the earlier Zainichi-themed films, the recently released films have enabled more humanistic representation of Zainichi Koreans. Moreover, Zainichi-themed films such as Our School (2007) were directed by South Korean film directors, respectively Kim Myeong-joon. This transnational trend has brought some new insights into the contemporary Zainichi cinema while reflecting this rapidly changing film industry.

== Film festivals and awards ==
=== Film festivals and awards received ===
- All Under the Moon (1993) by Sai Yoichi
  - 67th Kinema Junpo - Best Film Award
  - 36th Blue Ribbon Awards - Best Film Award and Best Actress Awards
  - 18th Hochi Film Awards - Best Film Award, Best Director Award, Best Actress Award
  - 48th Mainichi Film Awards - Best Film Award and Best Actor Award
  - 17th Japan Academy Prize - Best Film Award
- Go (2001) by Isao Yukisada
  - Hochi Film Awards – Best Film
  - Japanese Academy Prize – Best Cinematography; Best Director; Best Editing; Best Lighting; Best Screenplay; Outstanding Performance by an Actor in a Leading Role; Newcomer of the Year
  - Blue Ribbon Awards – Best Director
  - Kinema Junpo – Best Director; Best Film; Best Screenplay
  - Mainichi Film Concours – Best Screenplay; Sponichi Grand Prize New Talent Award
- Blood and Bones (2004) by Yōichi Sai
  - Japanese Academy Prize - Best Director, Best Screenplay, Best Actress, Best Supporting Actor
  - Kinema Junpo – Best Director, Best Screenplay, Best Actor, Best Supporting Actor
  - Hochi Film Award - Best Director
- Break Through! (2005) by Kazuyuki Izutsu
  - 48th Blue Ribbon Awards - Best Film
  - 27th Yokohama Film Festival - Best Film, Best Director, Best Best Cinematography, Best Newcomer
- Dear Pyongyang (2005) by Yang Yong-hi
  - 2006 Berlin International Film Festival - Netpac Award Winner
  - 2006 Sundance Film Festival - Special Jury Prize
- Sona, the Other Myself (2010) by Yang Yong-hi
  - 2009 Busan International Film Festival
  - 2010 Berlin International Film Festival
  - 2010 Nippon Connection
  - 2011 Pan-Asian Film Festival
- Our Homeland (2012) by Yang Yong-hi
  - 2012 Berlin International Film Festival

== Directors of Zainichi cinema (A-Z order) ==
- Arai, Hideo
- Chiba, Yasuki
- Chong, Wishing
- Izutsu, Kazuyuki
- Kato, Tai
- Kim, Myeong-joon
- Kobayashi, Masaki
- Lee, Hak-in
- Lee, Joon-ik
- Lee, Sang-il
- Oguri, Kohei
- Oh, Mipo
- Oshima, Nagisa
- Park, Yeong I
- Sai, Yoichi
- Sugino, Kiki
- Yang, Yong-hi
- Yukisada, Isao

== List of Zainichi-themed films ==
=== 1930s ===
- Look at This Mom (1930)
- Mr. Thank You (1936)

=== 1940s–50s ===
- The Brick Factory Girl (1940)
- Children of Korea (1952)
- The Thick-Walled Room (1956)
- Dotanba (The Eleventh Hour) (1957)

=== 1960s–70s ===
- By a Man's Face Shall You Know Him (1966)
- Three Resurrected Drunkards (1968)
- Death by Hanging (1968)
- River of the Stranger (1975)
- Yakuza Graveyard (1976)
- Red Tengi (1979)

=== 1980s–90s ===
- Empire of Kids (1981)
- For Kayako (1985)
- All Under the Moon (1993)

=== 2000s–present ===
- Go (2001)
- Deadly Outlaw: Rekka (2003)
- Blood and Bones (2004)
- Break Through! (2005)
- Dear Pyongyang (2005)
- Linda Linda Linda (2005)
- Our School (2007)
- Out of the Wind (2007)
- Pacchigi! Love & Peace (2007)
- Sona, the Other Myself (2010)
- Hard Romantic-er (2011)
- Our Homeland (2012)
- The Voice of Water (2014)
- The Blue Sky Symphony (2016)
- Seoul Searching (2016)
- Yakiniku Dragon (2018)
