= Perpetual foreigner =

Stereotype

The perpetual foreigner, forever foreigner, or perpetual other stereotype is a racist or xenophobic form of nativism in which naturalized and even native-born citizens (including families that have lived in a country for generations) are perceived by some members of society as foreign because they belong to a minority ethnic or racial group. When citizenship has been granted and yet the group of people is persistently viewed as foreign, the term alien citizen has been also used to in some scholarship describe these groups.

The term perpetual immigrant has been used for cases of migration, forced displacement, or other reasons for relocation, where no citizenship is possible despite the individual's long-term residency, wish to become a citizen, and even (though not necessarily) birth in the land. Furthermore, noncitizen nationals, or persons who hold nationality but not citizenship, have also been argued to fall under this stereotypical image. Naturalization laws vary, and some countries follow a rule of jus sanguinis in various forms. For example, Myanmar nationality law regards the Rohingya people as foreign.

Some countries have many refugees or other resident aliens with some groups, such as religious and ethnic out-groups of the country in question, often experiencing more barriers to citizenship compared to their in-group peers. A diaspora such as the overseas Chinese is often regarded as belonging to their ancestral homeland rather than to the country in which they live.

Part of the phenomenon where a person is of a separate nationality (and/or when considered different in the legal structure of the country, citizenship) from which they live can also be cases where the person is not seeking the nationality and/or citizenship of the country where they are, usually temporarily, living. Such persons are generally called expatriates, especially business expatriates or exchange students who live outside the country of their nationality for business or educational purposes, generally for a temporary period of time. They usually do not desire citizenship (given the choice in countries and time periods where there is one) or a change in nationality (whatever or whichever legal structure is pertinent to the country in question) and should not be confused with this stereotype.

== Ancient history ==
=== Athens ===
Like other Greek city-states of this time period, immigrants known as metics (Ancient Greek: metoikoi) came to Athens without a path to citizenship and could not participate in Athenian democracy. Recent scholarship has begun to examine Ancient Greek writings on contemporary sentiments of the day. It seems to show that people of the day were divided over anxieties around the intermingling and passing of these groups of people and the desire to continue to deny political agency to such members of society, while other contemporaries argued that such thinking was part of what turned democracy into a "noble lie".

"What makes this habit curious is that the Republic's narrative frame actually presents the idea that one's political "kind" (genos) expresses a pregiven, stable nature as a regulatory fiction. In these scenes, Socrates contrives the noble lie as an "artifice" (mēchanē) by which regimes, including the Athens of the dialogue's setting, found and reproduce membership status as a naturalized category."

=== Roman Empire ===
In the context of the Roman Empire, the politics of difference has generally been considered by scholars to look considerably different than notions around modern definitions of race, as has been recently discussed by Greg Woolf on the Oxford University Press Blog. Instead, Roman slave owners worried that one could not tell the difference between the enslaved and the free peoples of the Empire. Examples of Roman paranoia include a story told by Seneca where the Roman Senate once debated about requiring all slaves to wear a particular costume, until they realized this would reveal just how many slaves there were in Rome. And Pliny is recorded as recounting an encounter where a senator while in the Roman baths was mistaken for a slave.

However, this is not to say that Romans were immune from distinguishing themselves on the basis of certain characteristics. Vergil once referred to his people as gens togata (the 'toga-ed race' or 'the people who wear a toga'). Often differences such as manner of speech, what people wore, how they ate, and other habits were the target of definitions of "strangeness", including but not limited to cases where Roman senators needed to change their speech before holding office. And this was not to say that the Roman Empire was entirely made up of European peoples. Sites as far north as England have shown the movement of different peoples throughout the Empire, including from Africa and DNA analysis of 2,000-year-old remains in an Ancient Roman cemetery show that at least one person was of East Asian heritage. As pointed out by Woolf, ways of othering were simply not along the lines of modern notions of racialization and that the relative lack of physical differences between those who had freedom in the society and those who did not was a source of anxiety amongst the Roman elite.

== United States ==
Recent scholarship and analysis of immigration and citizenship law in the United States is reckoning with the historical construction of citizenship in the country and its effects on different populations, most especially in the gap between the perception of foreignness compared to actual foreignness (when discussed as a process within current psycho-social theories such as in-group and out-group hypothesis can also be referred to generally as "othering" or "the process of othering"). In the work Making Foreigners: Immigration and Citizenship Law in America, 1600–2000, Kunal M Parker writes:

"The special powerlessness of the immigrant has its source, we are wont to think, in the fact that the foreigner comes from elsewhere. The foreigner's origins outside the community supposedly make it possible and permissible for the community to deny his or her claims upon it. An entrenched constitutional tradition in the United States under-girds this view. Political theorists have offered elaborate arguments defending it. My own particular experience of the powerlessness of the immigrant seeking admission led me to wonder exactly what it is about an individual's coming from elsewhere that makes it possible to deny his or her claims on the community. I turned to the archives, if not for definitive answers, then at least for ways to transcend my own experience by learning about the experiences of others. What I discovered was that the experience of foreignness – and of the powerlessness associated with it – has never been unique to those coming from outside the United States. Over the centuries, Americans have named and treated like foreigners not only immigrants from outside the country, but also Native Americans, blacks, Latino Americans, Asian Americans, women, the poor, and political minorities. Designation as foreign is not a function of coming from the territorial outside. It is a political strategy that has been used inside and outside the country and to multiple ends."

The early history of the United States was marked by a period of ethnic and racially-based naturalization laws. The first naturalization act was passed by Congress on March 26, 1790, stated:

"That any alien, other than an enemy alien, being a free white person, who shall have resided within the limits and under the jurisdiction of the United States for the term of two years, may be admitted to become a citizen thereof, on application to any common law court of record in any one of the States wherein he shall have resided for the term of one year at least..."

The law was updated on January 29, 1795, to a length of five years, but the rest of the act remained fundamentally unchanged. Citizenship hinged partly on the definition of being considered "a free white". Despite being challenged as early as 1857 in Dred Scott v. Sanford by Dred Scott and his wife Harriet, it was not until the Fourteenth Amendment's Citizenship Clause written 1868 that began to take a significant step towards birthright citizenship

Scholarship studying freak shows in the 19th century and contemporary popular periodicals like Harper's Weekly and the San Francisco Golden Era were further used to illustrate who was, and who was not, an American. This exotification has been discussed as minimizing the individual, minimizing the complexity of their heritage, turning them into an object, and as having been used to further reinforce their 'un-Americanness'. Sometimes by direct reference, other times by indirect reference as has been argued with the Circassian Beauties who combined both Edward Said's description of Orientalism with a hairstyle similar to the 1970s Afro into a singular depiction of 'the other'.

In 1909 Armenians, Assyrians, and Jews were finally permitted exception from being barred from naturalization (as Jews had been in America since around the mid-1600s and Armenians since the early 1600s with Assyrian Americans being the most recent in the late 1800s) like other "Asiatics" and was announced in a statement from the New York Times that read:

"...Western Asiatics have become so mixed with Europeans during the past twenty-five centuries that it is impossible to tell whether they are white or should come under the statutes excluding the inhabitants of that part of the world and usually applied to the yellow race."

Notably George Washington wrote in 1790 to the Hebrew Congregations of Newport, Rhode Island stating that the United States "gives to bigotry no sanction, to persecution no assistance". It should not be overlooked either that Jews have occupied a place where they've been considered white on one hand, yet not on another in the history of the United States.

In 1898, Wong Kim Ark, who was born in the United States, was denied re-entry in the United States after a brief visit to China, prompting a landmark decision in the United States v. Wong Kim Ark case where the Supreme Court declared the denial unconstitutional. American actress Anna May Wong, despite having been a third-generation American and born in the United States, was issued a special "Certificate of Identity", signed by an immigration officer that was required to be carried by all "Chinese persons" as of its issuance in the 1920s.

During the late 1800s there was a series of mob massacres of persons of East Asian heritage in the United States, including but not limited to the Los Angeles Chinese massacre of 1871 and the Hells Canyon Massacre of 1887.

For Indigenous Americans, the story of citizenship was (and is) a bit more complicated. Laws such as the Dawes Act conditionally granted citizenship upon acceptance of agriculture and individual land parcels, one of many forced assimilation policies. All Indigenous Americans were granted citizenship status on June 2, 1924, by President Calvin Coolidge in the Indian Citizenship Act, this act on one hand opened up voting opportunities and on another denied the sovereignty of the Indigenous Nations. Currently, many Indigenous Americans hold a sense of dual citizenship, recognizing both Indigenous sovereignty and their American identity.

A survey conducted in 2005 notes that the implicit stigma that 'white' equals American persists to this day. This correlation was also observed in a pop culture experiment where the American actress Lucy Liu was perceived as less American than the British actress Kate Winslet. Notably, all groups deemed less 'American' have all been denied citizenship status at one time or another during United States history. Additionally, naturalization barriers between 'whites' and other groups continue to persist. According to a study in 2022, non-Hispanic whites are still more likely to be granted citizenship status compared to all other persons, although studied in particular with respect to African, persons from Muslim-majority countries, and Hispanic immigrants, when seeking naturalization.

This stereotype has been popularly discussed as a negative stereotype of Asian Americans, but it has also affected other minority groups, which have been considered to be "the other" and therefore legally unassimilable, either historically or currently. In personal interactions, it can take the form of an act of microaggression in which a member of a minority group may be asked, "Where are you from?" It can also take the form of an explicit act of aggression in which a member of a minority group may be told, "Go back to where you came from." African Americans have been told "go back to Africa" as a racial insult, despite the fact that on average, they are more likely to have a multi-generational family history in the United States than European Americans are.

Furthermore, comments such as these also affect Indigenous Americans. In 2017 during a protest, "go back to where you came from" was ignorantly shouted at Indigenous protestors. American Cree comedian Charlie Hill was recorded as saying, "A redneck told me to go back to where I came from, so I put up a tipi in his backyard!"

The U.S. Equal Employment Opportunity Commission defines workplace comments like "Go back where you came from" as a potentially illegal form of ethnic harassment. The message conveys a sense that the person is "not supposed to be there, or that it isn't their place," and it is often encountered when the minority person is "speaking out in predominantly white spaces."

Hate crimes, such as the murder of Vincent Chin, are described as the most brutal form of the perpetual foreigner syndrome.

== Post-Soviet states ==
Crimean Tatars are an indigenous people of Crimea with clearly established pre-Golden Horde Scythian, Greek, and Goth roots, but authorities and nativists long have treated them as perpetual foreigners. When Crimean Tatars who had been forcibly exiled in the Stalin era attempted to return to Crimea before perestroika, they were frequently met with severe hostility by officials who took violent measures to keep them out and had orders to prevent them from returning to their native land. Meanwhile, Russian publications referred to deported Crimean Tatars returning to the places of their birth as foreigners.

Volga Germans had citizenship in the Soviet Union and later in the Russian Federation, but also in Germany under jus sanguinis. Nazi Germany had a policy of Heim ins Reich to encourage them to return to Germany. When many immigrated to North America before the 1917 Russian Revolution many were first presented and welcomed as Russian scientific farmers, but after WW1 as "enemy aliens". In Russia during World War II they were distrusted as foreigners and many were deported to Siberia. After the Fall of the Soviet Union many returned to their ancestral homeland, Germany, where they are often seen as Russians.

== Haitians in the Dominican Republic ==
Before 2010, the Constitution of the Dominican Republic generally granted citizenship to anyone born in the country, except children of diplomats and persons "in transit". The 2010 constitution was amended to define all undocumented residents as "in transit". On September 23, 2013, the Dominican Republic Constitutional Court issued a ruling that retroactively applied this definition to 1929, the year Haiti and the Dominican Republic formalized the border. The decision stripped Dominican citizenship from about 210,000 people who were born in the Dominican Republic after 1929 but are descended from undocumented immigrants from Haiti. Many Haitians born in the Dominican Republic do not have Haitian citizenship and have never been to Haiti; hence the decision rendered them at least temporarily stateless.

== Other uses ==
In work done by Ediberto Roman The Alien-Citizen Paradox and other Consequences of U.S. Colonialism, Ediberto discussed the complexity of the continuum between 'alien' and 'citizen' to describe the status of U.S. noncitizen nationals in the U.S. Territories where the residents are at once American nationals, but without the same rights as citizens including but not limited to voting rights, and are otherwise considered foreign despite nationality status.

== Critical responses ==
The Asian American Education Project, founded in 2005 by Stewart Kwoh and aimed at educating students of primary school through secondary school age (in the United States, K-12 grades) includes dedicated sections on the Perpetual Foreigner Stereotype in the context of Asian Americans. Attempts to deconstruct this and other community-relevant stereotypes have been through movements mandating Asian American studies in an effort to show that members of the community do indeed belong in America. Controversially, this has included Florida governor since 2019 Ron DeSantis who was criticized by the Asian American community for the mandate while simultaneously banning courses on institutionalized racism, one of the fears being the use of Asian American history to promote discrimination against other minorities through an "untruthful representation" including but not limited to highlighting the divisive idea of Asian exceptionalism against the wishes of many in the Asian American community. Diversity, equity, and inclusion practitioner and corporate educator Lily Zheng has advocated in her book DEI Deconstructed: Your No-Nonsense Guide to Doing the Work and Doing it Right for the need for better practices in the field, referencing in part the Harvard Business Review article Why Diversity Programs Fail and the statistics that after many DEI programs were implemented the hiring of all groups except for white men decreased during the surveyed interval.

A wide variety of art forms including but hardly limited to literature, music, film, and photography have also attempted to grapple in small ways with this stereotype (among others) and provide a place to rework the script of identity and belonging. Some examples include Langston Hughes' poem and notable work of the Harlem Renaissance "I, Too" which proclaims at the end "I, too, am America". The American Dakota writer Zitkála-Šá penned the poem The Red Man's America comments generally on the experiences of Indigenous people in America as outsiders to "liberty and equality" in the new nation and ends with the plea "give us just human right". The music anthology jazz-blues-soul fusion album "A Grain of Sand: Music for the Struggle by Asians in America" first released in 1973, sought in part to claim the historical presence of Asian Americans in the United States and evolved from the artist's involvement in the Asian American Movement. For example, the track Wandering Chinaman covers the narrator's common experiences with other Americans, from losing his money in the Great Depression to one of his son's deaths serving in the Vietnam War. The album also covered a diverse range of other topics, including solidarity with other American communities, including African Americans, Latino/a Americans and Indigenous Americans. The academic work of literary analysis LatinAsian Cartographies by Susan Thananopavarn argues for the importance of both Latina/o and Asian American writers in illuminating how American national identity has been constructed historically and continues to be constructed to this day. Photographer Andrew Kung and creative director Kathleen Namgung visually explore the concept of exploring Asian American belonging in everyday American spaces in the collection titled "Perpetual Foreigner".

Covering the topic of the complexity of identity in then French North Africa during World War II, the French film Days of Glory by the director Rachid Bouchareb depicts the struggle of North Africans who were fighting for a country they had never seen, were a part of yet separate within the structure of colonial rule, and not given the same privileges as other French soldiers, including the continued denial of war pensions until at least partial recognition after the film's release.

In her review of the film Minari, American author, journalist and vice-chair for the board of Christians for Social Action Kathy KyoungAh Khang reflected on her own story where immigration was learned as part of her family's past rather than present reality. in further reflection, she states:

"While constant reminders that I am not a 'real' American are exhausting and dangerous because they feed anti-Asian racism and xenophobia, the flipside is that God and I both know my belovedness doesn't rely on how American or white I become but rather on how God sees me... The practices of communal worship, communion, and even prayers that are spoken in different languages across the ages bind us together and tell a story of faith. We pray words that Jesus spoke more than 2,000 years ago, and in doing so we embrace, remember, and build our lives on the lived experiences of a Jewish refugee, and that matters – or at least it should."

— Kathy KyoungAh Khang

The Canadian YouTube video essay channel Accented Cinema has commented on this stereotype in some videos, most notably in his video essay on the blockbuster American movie Shang-Chi stating that although the film broke new ground for Asians in Hollywood in many ways, especially in the beginning, the second arc where the main protagonists travel to China is "more about coming home" where "the American side of Shang-Chi's Asian American identity no longer matters". Drawing partly on his own experiences in Montreal where speaking with a classmate from China would elicit 'you are in Quebec, we speak French here' and regular 'go back to China' comments reflected that "my culture, my language, and my skin color are not welcome here" and in visiting China where "Chinese people would instantly recognize me as someone from outside." He goes on further "I was really hoping it was a story about a man being sandwiched between a world that doesn't welcome him and one that doesn't love him anymore" as this would reflect experiences common to many people of Asian heritage in North America. Ultimately he concludes that the film was in general "more eager to represent China than Asian Americans".

Furthermore, as noted in the video essay When Hollywood Speaks Chinese, I Cringe on the topic of the use of Chinese languages in Hollywood movies he goes on to mention the lack of acknowledgment for the development of regional dialectal differences in North American Cantonese (and also in Australian Cantonese) speakers as the language as part of the American story:

"We've previously talked about the perpetual foreigner trope on this channel and much of the Chinese language stereotypes stem from this trope. Chinese languages are perceived as 'foreign' and 'exotic'. It makes people, including filmmakers, less likely to want to understand it. But just as Chinatown is an iconic part of many US cities, the collection of Chinese languages is also a significant part of US culture... Chinese Americans developed their own accents with their own American identities. Treating languages with respect isn't just good film-making, it also better reflects the diversity of the American people and culture. So, here is my plea to all Hollywood film makers. The United States is a very colorful place. Its complexity is precisely why it is beautiful."

— Accented Cinema

In China, growing animosity towards Americans has equally affected Americans of Chinese heritage as much as other Americans, where "go back to where you came from" is becoming an increasingly common insult, viewed as equally foreign in China as in the United States.

Following the November 2015 terrorist attacks in Paris on French magazine Charlie Hebdo, the Israeli Prime Minister in 2015 Benjamin Netanyahu was known for stating "To all the Jews of France, all the Jews of Europe, I would like to say that Israel is not just the place in whose direction you pray, the State of Israel is your home...All Jews who want to immigrate to Israel will be welcomed here warmly and with open arms" and in a separate speech "Jews have a right to live in many countries...But I believe they know deep down in their hearts that they have only one country, the State of Israel". These comments prompted partial commentary by some Jewish European citizens due to the divisive implication that any other place a Jewish person may choose to call home isn't really home at all and critiquing such use of Jewishness for the nationalistic ends of Israel.

Beginning in the 1950s and ending roughly in 1984, North Korea targeted ethnic Koreans living in Japan to emigrate with promises of a "paradise on earth". Approximately 90,000 people moved from Japan to North Korea in the intervening years. This has allegedly included the cooperation of the Red Cross Societies in Japan and sponsorship by the controversial organization Chongryon. Sentiment amongst the Zainichi Koreans was not helped by the stripping of Japanese nationality by contemporary policy makers or Imperial Japan's policies that at times included forced deportation of Koreans to Japan during World War II. In looking back on the incident, Harunori Kojima, a former head of the repatriation support office remarked "I was actively involved in the project, believing it was something positive. But as a result, I led people into Hell". Film director and author Yang Yong-hi has made several movies regarding her family's personal experiences with these events as a Zainichi Korean family torn between living in Japan and returning to Korea. Through her films Dear Pyongyang (and her book of the same name that expands on the themes of the movie), Sona, the Other Myself and Our Homeland she explores the propaganda of North Korea at the time, her father's strong ideological beliefs, his decision to send his three sons to North Korea, the lasting toll this decision has had on her family, and explores her perspective on the concept of homeland. She states in an interview with Korea JoongAng Daily, "I can't wear any T-shirts bearing a country's flag. I am almost allergic to that. In the movie, homeland is a place, not a specific country...I chose the word as a title because I also want to search for a place where I can call home."

== See also ==
- Allosemitism
- Armenian genocide
- Nuremberg Laws
- Joseph Stalin and antisemitism
- Koreans in Japan
- Laowai
- Pendatang asing
- Right of return
- Citizenship
- Nationality
- Rootless cosmopolitan
