= 2006 Sundance Film Festival =

2006 film festival edition

- Festival poster
- Opening film: Friends with Money
- Closing film: Alpha Dog
- Location: Park City, Salt Lake City, Ogden, and Sundance, Utah
- Hosted by: Sundance Institute
- No. of films: 120
- Festival date: January 19–29, 2006
- Website: festival.sundance.org/2006
- 2007 Sundance Film Festival 2005 Sundance Film Festival

The 2006 Sundance Film Festival was held in Utah from January 19 to January 29, 2006. It was held in Park City, with screenings in Salt Lake City; Ogden; and the Sundance Resort. It was the 22nd iteration of the Sundance Film Festival, and the celebration of the 25th anniversary of the Sundance Institute. The opening night film was Friends with Money; the closing night film was Alpha Dog.

== Awards ==
The official announcement of the winners can be found here.

- Grand Jury Prize: Documentary - God Grew Tired of Us
- Grand Jury Prize: Dramatic - Quinceañera
- World Cinema Jury Prize: Documentary - In The Pit
- World Cinema Jury Prize: Dramatic - 13 Tzameti
- Audience Award: Documentary - God Grew Tired of Us
- Audience Award: Dramatic - Quinceañera
- World Cinema Audience Award: Documentary - De Nadie
- World Cinema Audience Award: Dramatic - No. 2
- Documentary Directing Award - James Longley director of Iraq in Fragments
- Dramatic Directing Award - Dito Montiel for A Guide to Recognizing Your Saints
- Excellence in Cinematography Award: Documentary - James Longley for Iraq in Fragments
- Excellence in Cinematography Award: Dramatic - Tom Richmond for Right at Your Door
- Documentary Film Editing - Iraq in Fragments
- Waldo Salt Screenwriting Award - Hilary Brougher for Stephanie Daley
- Special Jury Prize - American Blackout
- Special Jury Prize - A Guide to Recognizing Your Saints (for Best Ensemble Performance)
- Special Jury Prize - In Between Days (for Independent Vision)
- Special Jury Prize - Into Great Silence
- Special Jury Prize - Dear Pyongyang
- Special Jury Prize - Eve & the Fire Horse
- Special Jury Prize - TV Junkie
- Jury Prize in Short Filmmaking - Bugcrush
- Jury Prize in Short Filmmaking - The Wrath of Cobble Hill
- Jury Prize in International Short Filmmaking - The Natural Route
- Honorable Mention in Short Filmmaking - Before Dawn
- Honorable Mention in Short Filmmaking - Preacher With an Unknown God
- Honorable Mention in Short Filmmaking - Undressing My Mother
- 2006 Alfred P. Sloan Prize - The House of Sand

== Juries ==
The juries at the Sundance Film Festival are responsible for determining the Jury Prize winners in each category and to award Special Jury Prizes as they see fit.

=== Jury, Independent Film Competition: Documentary ===
- Joe Bini
- Zana Briski
- Andrew Jarecki
- Alexander Payne
- Heather Rae

=== Jury, Independent Film Competition: Dramatic ===
- Miguel Arteta
- Terrence Howard
- Alan Rudolph
- Nancy Schreiber
- Audrey Wells

=== Jury, World Cinema Competition: Documentary ===
- Kate Amend
- Jean-Xavier de Lestrade
- Rachel Perkins

=== Jury, World Cinema Competition: Dramatic ===
- Irene Bignardi
- Lu Chuan
- Thomas Vinterberg

=== Jury, Shorts Competition ===
- Georgia Lee
- Sydney Neter
- John Vanco

=== Alfred P. Sloan Feature Film Prize Jury ===
- John Underkoffler
- Greg Harrison
- Lynn Hershman Leeson
- Antonio Demasio

== Films ==
=== Independent Film Competition: Documentary ===
- American Blackout
- Crossing Arizona
- God Grew Tired of Us
- The Ground Truth: After the Killing Ends
- Iraq in Fragments
- A Lion in the House
- small town gay bar
- So Much So Fast
- Thin
- 'Tis Autumn-The Search for Jackie Paris
- The Trials of Darryl Hunt
- TV Junkie
- An Unreasonable Man
- Wide Awake
- Wordplay
- The World According to Sesame Street

=== Independent Film Competition: Dramatic ===
- Come Early Morning
- Flannel Pajamas
- Forgiven
- A Guide to Recognizing Your Saints
- Half Nelson
- The Hawk Is Dying
- In Between Days
- Puccini for Beginners
- Quinceañera
- Right at Your Door
- Sherrybaby
- Somebodies
- Stay
- Steel City
- Stephanie Daley
- Wristcutters: A Love Story

=== World Cinema Competition: Documentary ===
- 5 Days
- angry monk-reflections on tibet
- Black Gold
- By the Ways, A Journey with William Eggleston
- Dear Pyongyang
- DeNADIE
- The Giant Buddhas
- Glastonbury
- I for India
- In the Pit
- Into Great Silence
- KZ
- The Short Life of José Antonio Gutierrez
- Songbirds
- Unfolding Florence: The Many Lives of Florence Broadhurst
- Viva Zapatero!

=== World Cinema Competition: Dramatic ===
- 13 Tzameti
- Allegro
- The Aura
- The Blossoming of Maximo Oliveros
- Eve & the Fire Horse
- The House of Sand
- It's Only Talk
- Kiss Me Not on the Eyes
- Little Red Flowers
- Madeinusa
- No. 2
- One Last Dance
- The Peter Pan Formula
- Princesas
- Sólo Dios Sabe
- Son of Man

=== Premieres ===
- Alpha Dog
- Art School Confidential
- Cargo
- The Darwin Awards
- Don't Come Knocking
- Friends with Money
- The Illusionist
- Kinky Boots
- Little Miss Sunshine
- A Little Trip to Heaven
- Lucky Number Slevin
- Neil Young: Heart of Gold
- The Night Listener
- The Science of Sleep
- The Secret Life of Words
- Thank You for Smoking
- This Film Is Not Yet Rated

=== Spectrum ===
- Adam's Apples
- All Aboard! Rosie's Family Cruise
- Battle in Heaven
- Beyond Beats and Rhymes: A Hip-Hop Head Weighs in on Manhood in Hip-Hop Culture
- Clear Cut: The Story of Philomath, Oregon
- Dreamland
- Everyone Stares: The Police Inside Out
- Factotum
- Forgiving the Franklins
- An Inconvenient Truth
- Jewboy
- Journey from the Fall
- Leonard Cohen: I'm Your Man
- Man Push Cart
- Off the Black
- Open Window
- The Proposition
- Punching at the Sun
- Special
- La Tragedia de Macario
- What Remains
- Who Killed the Electric Car
- Who Needs Sleep?
- Wrestling with Angels: Playwright Tony Kushner

=== Park City at Midnight ===
- American Hardcore
- Awesome; I Fuckin' Shot That!
- The Descent
- Destricted
- The Foot Fist Way
- Moonshine
- Salvage
- Subject Two

=== Frontier ===
- Cinnamon
- a Darkness Swallowed
- Old Joy
- Pine Flat
- Wild Tigers I Have Known

=== From The Collection ===
- Mala Noche
- Paris, Texas

== Festival Theaters ==
- Ogden
  - Peery's Egyptian Theatre - 800 seats
- Park City
  - Eccles Theatre - 1,270 seats
  - Egyptian Theatre - 266 seats
  - Holiday Village Cinemas II - 156 seats
  - Holiday Village Cinemas III - 156 seats
  - Holiday Village Cinemas IIV - 164 seats
  - Library Center Theatre - 448 seats
  - Prospector Square Theatre - 352 seats
  - Racquet Club Theatre - 602 seats
  - Yarrow Hotel Theatre - 250 seats
- Salt Lake City
  - Broadway Centre Cinemas IV - 211 seats
  - Broadway Centre Cinemas V - 238 seats
  - Broadway Centre Cinemas VI - 274 seats
  - Rose Wagner Performing Arts Center - 477 seats
  - Tower Theatre - 342 seats
- Sundance Resort
  - Sundance Institute Screening Room - 164 seats
