= Kings Valley Charter School =

Public charter school in Oregon, USA

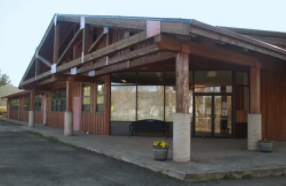

Location
- 38840 Kings Valley Hwy; Philomath, (Benton County), Oregon 97370; United States
- 44.6948°N 123.4329°W

Information
- Type: Public Charter
- Opened: Established 1848, reopened 2001
- School district: Philomath School District
- CEEB code: 380822
- Administrator: Michael Chung & Athena Lodge
- Grades: K-12
- Enrollment: 207
- Colors: Blue and yellow
- Mascot: Eagle
- Team name: Eagles
- Website: www.philomathsd.net/kings-valley-home

Kings Valley Charter School is a K-12 public charter school located one mile outside of Kings Valley, Oregon, United States.

== Demographics ==
Enrollment in the 2012–2013 school year was 179.

== History ==
The school opened in 1848; after 153 years of operation, it was closed in 2001 by the Philomath School District. After being closed for one year, it was reopened as a K-5 charter school. As of the 2011–12 school year, it had expanded into a K-12 school.

In 2016 King Valley Charter School asked the Philomath School District (PSD) to increase the number of students in the school, which PSD granted.

=== Lawsuit ===
In July 2012, Kings Valley Charter School sued the Philomath School District for withholding money set aside for rural funding. PSD then countered by claiming that Kings Valley Charter School violated its charter for contracting its employees through an outside group called People Sustaining Kings Valley (PSKV); this was done to avoid paying pensions into the public employees' retirement system.
