= History of Asian Americans =

Asian American history is the history of ethnic and racial groups in the United States who are of Asian descent. The term "Asian American" was an idea invented in the 1960s to bring together Chinese, Japanese, and Filipino Americans for strategic political purposes. Soon other groups of Asian origin, such as Korean, Indian, and Vietnamese Americans were added. For example, while many Chinese, Japanese, and Filipino immigrants arrived as unskilled workers in significant numbers from 1850 to 1905 and largely settled in Hawaii and California, many Vietnamese, Cambodian, and Hmong Americans arrived in the United States as refugees following the Vietnam War. These separate histories have often been overlooked in conventional frameworks of Asian American history.

Since 1965, shifting immigration patterns have resulted in a higher proportion of highly educated Asian immigrants entering the United States. This image of success is often referred to as the "model minority" myth.

== Hostility to immigration ==
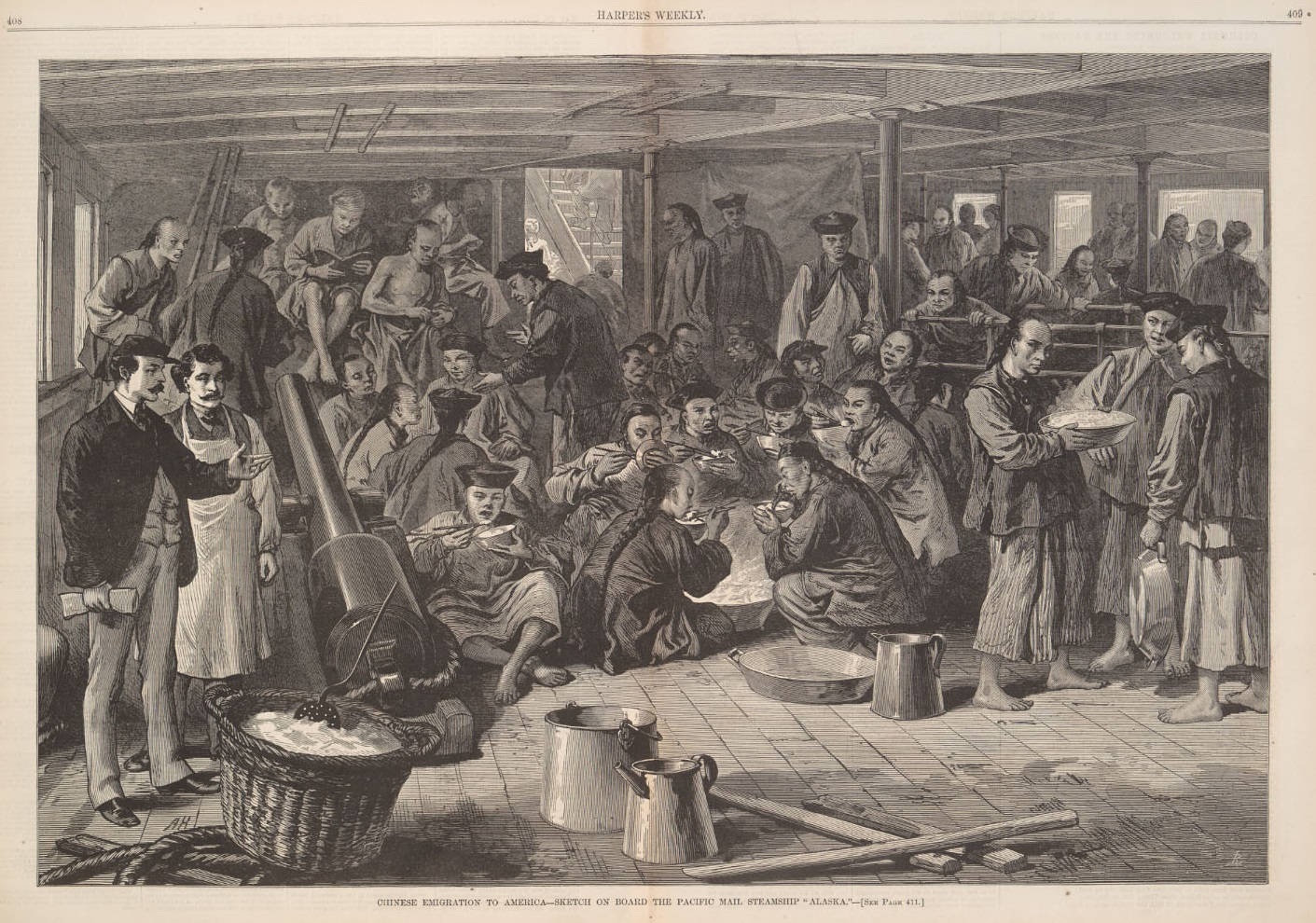
Chinese Emigration to America: Sketch on Board the Steam Ship Alaska, Bound fo San Francisco. -The Illustrated London News, 1876.

The Chinese arrived in the US in large numbers on the West Coast in the 1850s and 1860s to work in the gold mines and railroads. The Central Pacific railroad hired thousands, but after the line was finished in 1869 they were hounded out of many railroad towns in states such as Wyoming and Nevada. Most wound up in Chinatowns—areas of large cities which the police largely ignored. The Chinese were further alleged to be "coolies" and were said to be not suitable for becoming independent thoughtful voters because of their control by tongs. The same negative reception hit the Asians who migrated to Mexico and Canada.

== Chronology ==
Major milestones according to standard reference works and others are:

=== 16th century ===
- 1587: "Luzonians" (Filipinos from Luzon Island) arrive in Morro Bay (San Luis Obispo) California on board the galleon ship Nuestra Señora de Buena Esperanza under the command of Spanish Captain Pedro de Unamuno during the Manila galleon traide.
- 1595: Filipino sailors aboard a Spanish "galleon" the San Agustin which was commanded by Captain Sebastian Rodriguez Cermeno arrive on the shores of Point Reyes outside the mouth of the Bay Area. The ship was on a trip to Acapulco before it was shipwrecked on the aforementioned area.

=== 17th century ===
- 1635: an "East Indian" is listed in Jamestown, Virginia.

=== 18th century ===
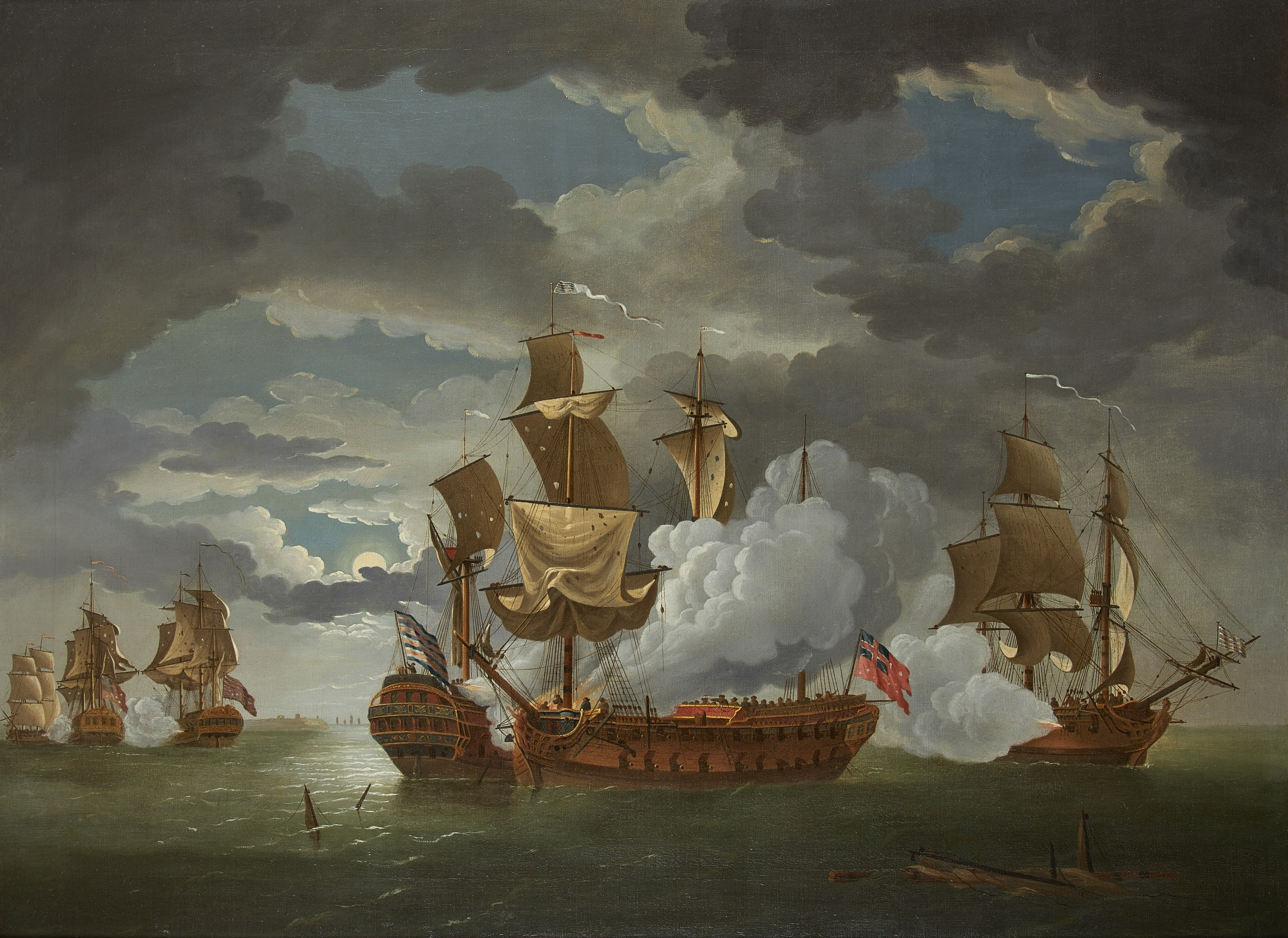
Several Malay sailors fought on the American side at the Battle of Flamborough Head (1779) in the American Revolutionary War

- 1763:
  - Notice for a captured suspected runaway slave on July 20, 1763, "not resembling the African negros", born in Bombay and spoke good English
  - Filipinos established the small settlement of Saint Malo in the bayous of Louisiana, after fleeing mistreatment aboard Spanish ships. Since there were no Filipino women with them, the "Manilamen," as they were known, married Cajun and Native American women.
- 1768–1794: Records of three escaped slaves of East Indian ethnicity documented in Virginia and Philadelphia
- 1775–1783:
  - At least 100 or more Asian Americans lived in the Thirteen Colonies around the time of the American Revolution.
  - Four well-documented Asian Americans are known to have fought in the American Revolution (two serving with the American rebels and two with the British).
- 1778: Chinese sailors first arrive to Hawaii. Many settled down and married Hawaiian women.
- 1779: Malays were listed as one of the many ethnicities who were part of the crew of the USS Bonhomme Richard during the Battle of Flamborough Head, in the North Sea.
- 1785: Chinese sailors of an American ship reached Baltimore.
- 1798: A tombstone in Boston was dedicated to a person named Chow Mandarin, aged 19, who was born in Canton and died falling off a ship's masthead on September 11, 1798.

=== 19th century ===
- 1815: Filipinos working as shrimp fishermen and smugglers in Louisiana serve under General Andrew Jackson's American forces in the War of 1812 and as artillery gunners at the Battle of New Orleans.
- 1820s: Chinese (mostly merchants, sailors, and students) begin to immigrate via Sino-U.S. maritime trade.
- 1829: Famous conjoined twins Chang and Eng Bunker, both born in Siam (modern-day Thailand), began performing on a series of tours in Boston, New York, and Philadelphia, with a Siamese translator brought along to help translate for Chang and Eng. Chang and Eng became naturalized US citizens in the 1830s and settled down in North Carolina. Two of their sons with their American wives later fought for the Confederacy during the American Civil War.
- 1835: First account of Chinese laborers on Hawaii by an American, who were noted to perform efficient, backbreaking work compared to indigenous Hawaiian laborers. In response, an Anglo-American entrepreneur hires the first Chinese paid laborers in Hawaii and recommends the importation of Chinese laborers to the Continental US.
- 1841: Captain Whitfield, commanding an American whaler in the Pacific, rescues five shipwrecked Japanese sailors. Four disembark at Honolulu. Manjiro Nakahama stays on board returning with Whitfield to Fairhaven, Massachusetts. After attending school in New England and adopting the name John Manjiro, he later becomes an interpreter for Commodore Matthew Perry.
- 1848–1855: First mass wave of Chinese immigrants to the US for gold prospecting including in states such as California, North Dakota, and South Dakota. The California Gold Rush (1848–1855) was a period of American history in which the most gold seen at the time was discovered. The initial discovery of gold in America in 1848 attracted many immigrants who were intent on the opportunity and potential wealth that came with gold mining. Word of a mountain of gold across the ocean arrived in Hong Kong in 1849, and quickly spread throughout the Chinese provinces. By 1851, 25,000 Chinese immigrants had left their homes and moved to California, a land some came to call gam saan, or "gold mountain". In 1852, 20,000 Chinese-Americans migrated to California, totaling 67,000 Chinese immigrants in California. In response to increased Chinese immigration, the California legislature passed a new foreign miner's tax of $4 a month.
- 1850: Seventeen survivors of a Japanese shipwreck were saved by an American freighter; In 1852, the group joins Commodore Matthew Perry to help open diplomatic relations with Japan. One of them, Joseph Heco (Hikozo Hamada) later becomes a naturalized US citizen.
- 1854:
  - In People v. Hall, the California Supreme Court case that denied the rights of Chinese immigrants and Chinese Americans to testify against white citizens.
  - Yung Wing becomes the first Chinese American student to graduate from an American university (Yale College)
- 1861–1865: Several dozen Asian American volunteers enlist in the Union Army and Union Navy during the American Civil War. Smaller numbers serve in the armed forces of the Confederate States of America.
- 1861: The utopian minister Thomas Lake Harris of the Brotherhood of the New Life visits England, where he meets Nagasawa Kanaye, who becomes a convert. Nagasawa returns to the US with Harris and follows him to Fountaingrove in Santa Rosa, California. When Harris leaves the Californian commune, Nagasawa became the leader and remained there until his death in 1932.
- 1862: California imposes a tax of $2.50 a month on every Chinese man.
- 1865: The Central Pacific Railroad Co. recruits Chinese workers for the transcontinental railroad from California to Utah. Many are killed or injured in the harsh conditions blasting through difficult mountain terrain.
- 1869: A group of Japanese build the Wakamatsu Tea and Silk Farm Colony in Gold Hill, California
- 1869: The Fourteenth Amendment gives full citizenship to every person born in the United States, regardless of race.
- 1877: Denis Kearney organizes anti-Chinese movement in San Francisco and forms the Workingmen's Party of California, alleging that Chinese workers took lower wages, poorer conditions, and longer hours than white workers were willing to tolerate.
- 1878: Chinese are ruled ineligible for naturalized citizenship.
- 1882: Chinese Exclusion Act is passed banning immigration of laborers from China. Students and businessmen are allowed. Large numbers of Chinese gain entry by claiming American birth.
- 1884: Philip Jaisohn, a Korean independence activist and physician who later became an American citizen among Koreans for the first time, arrived in the United States.
- 1885: The Rock Springs massacre in Wyoming leaves 28 Chinese miners dead.
- 1887: Robbers kill 31 Chinese miners Snake River, Oregon.
- 1890: In Hawaiʻi, then an independent country, sugar plantations hire large numbers of Japanese, Chinese and Filipinos. They form a majority of the population by 1898.
- 1892: When Chinese Exclusion Act expired in 1892, Congress extended it for 10 years in the form of the Geary Act. This extension, made permanent in 1902, added restrictions by requiring each Chinese resident to register and obtain a certificate of residence. Without a certificate, they faced deportation.
- 1898: Hawaii joins the US as a territory. Most residents are Asian and they receive full US citizenship.
- 1898: The Philippines joins the US as a territory. The residents of the Philippines become US nationals.

=== 20th century ===
==== 1901 to 1940 ====
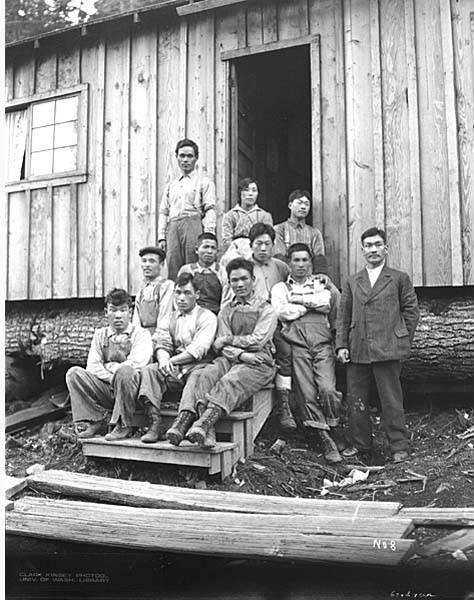
Asian American loggers in Clallam Bay, Washington, c. 1919.

- 1902: Yone Noguchi publishes The American Diary of a Japanese Girl.
- 1903: Ahn Chang Ho, pen name Dosan, founded the Friendship Society in 1903 and the Mutual Assistant Society.
- 1904: Syngman Rhee (이승만), comes to the US to earn a BA at George Washington University and a Ph.D. from Princeton University. In 1910, he returned to Korea and became a political activist during Japanese occupation of Korea. He later became the first president of South Korea.
- 1906: The San Francisco Board of Education segregates Japanese students, but withdraws at the request of President Theodore Roosevelt and protests by the Japanese government.
- 1907: Gentlemen's Agreement between United States and Japan that Japan would stop issuing passports for new laborers.
- 1910: Angel Island in San Francisco Bay opens as the major station for as many as 175,000 Chinese and 60,000 Japanese immigrants between 1910 and 1940.
- 1913: California bans Japanese immigrants ("Issei") from purchasing land; land is purchased instead in the names of US-born children ("Nisei") who are citizens
- 1924: United States Immigration Act of 1924 (Oriental Exclusion Act) banned most immigration from Asia. The quota for most Asian countries is zero. Public opinion in Japan is outraged by the insult.
- 1927: In the infamous case of Lum v. Rice, the Supreme Court found that states possess the right to define a Chinese student as non-white for the purpose of segregating them in public schools.
- 1930: Anti-Filipino riot occurred in Watsonville, California.
- 1933: Filipinos are ruled ineligible for citizenship barring immigration. Roldan v. Los Angeles County found that existing California anti-miscegenation laws did not bar Filipino-white marriages, but the state quickly moved to amend the law and made it so that Filipinos could no longer marry White people.
- 1935: Tydings–McDuffie Act gives "Commonwealth" status to the Philippines hence allowing immigration of Filipinos; Philippines independence is scheduled for 1946
- 1940: Bruce Lee was born November 27, 1940, in the Chinatown area of San Francisco, California.

==== 1941 to 1999 ====
- 1941: Japanese navy attacks Pearl Harbor; FBI arrests pro-Japanese community leaders in Hawaii and US.
- 1941: Japanese army invades the Philippines.
- 1941–1945: Filipino resistance movement, working closely with US Army, fights the Japanese invaders.
- 1942: President Franklin D. Roosevelt signs Executive Order 9066 on February 19, ordering the internment of Japanese Americans. The action uprooted more than 100,000 people of Japanese descent on the US West Coast; similar actions take place in Canada.
- 1943: After China became an ally during World War II, Chinese Exclusion Act proved to be an embarrassment and were finally repealed by the Magnuson Act in 1943. This bill made it possible for Chinese to become naturalized citizens and gave them an annual quota of 105 immigrants.
- 1943: Japanese American soldiers from Hawaii join the US Army 100th Battalion arrive in Europe.
- 1944: US Army 100th Battalion merges with the all-volunteer Asian Americans of Japanese descent 442nd Regimental Combat Team.
- 1945: 442nd Regimental Combat team awarded 18,143 decorations including 9,486 Purple Heart decorations becoming the highest decorated military unit in United States history.
- 1946: the Luce–Celler Act of 1946 grants naturalization opportunities to Filipino Americans and Indian Americans (which included present-day Pakistanis and Bangladeshis) and re-established immigration from the Indian subcontinent and the Philippines.
- 1947–1989: Strong American interest in Asia during Cold War, especially Korea and Vietnam.
- 1947: Wataru Misaka, a Japanese American, was the first player of color and first American of Asian descent and the first non-Caucasian person to play in the National Basketball Association (NBA), known then as the Basketball Association of America (BAA) making him the person that broke the professional basketball color barrier the same year that Baseball player Jackie Robinson broke the baseball color barrier.
- 1948: Olympic divers Vicki Draves and Sammy Lee became the first Asian Americans to win an Olympic gold medal for the United States.
- 1951: The Gallery of Madame Liu-Tsong the first US television series starring an Asian American series lead was launched on the now defunct television network DuMont. The lead actress of the series was Anna May Wong the first female Asian American movie star and the first Chinese American movie star.
- 1952: Walter–McCarran Act nullifies all federal anti-Asian exclusion laws and allows for naturalization of all Asians.
- 1956: Dalip Singh Saund (1899–1973), a Sikh from California, becomes the first Asian to be elected to Congress.
- 1957: Japanese American James Kanno is elected mayor of Fountain Valley, California.
- 1962: Professional American football player Roman Gabriel, was the first Asian American to start as an NFL quarterback.
- 1962: Daniel Inouye of Hawaiʻi elected for the US Senate; he wins reelection in 1968, 1974, 1980, 1986, 1992, 1998, 2004, and 2010.
- 1962: Wing Luke becomes the first Asian American to hold elected office (Seattle City Council) in the State of Washington.
- 1963: Rocky Fellers, a Filipino American boy band is first Asian American to hit Billboard 100."Killer Joe" reached No. 16 on the Billboard Hot 100 in April 1963, No. 1 in both New York and Los Angeles, CA.
- 1964: Grace Lee Boggs author and social activist, met with Malcolm X and unsuccessfully attempted to convince him to run for the United States Senate.
- 1964: Senator Hiram Fong of Hawaii becomes first Asian American to run for President of the United States, as a favorite son candidate in his state's primary. He is also the first person from Hawaii to run for president, and runs again in 1968.
- 1965: Yuri Kochiyama, human rights activist and longtime friend of Malcolm X, on February 21, the day of X's assassination, at the Audubon Ballroom in Washington Heights, runs to X after he is shot and holds him in her arms as he lies dying.
- 1965: Patsy Mink of Hawaii becomes the first woman of color elected to Congress.
- 1965: John Wing serves as Mississippi's first Chinese American mayor; he serves as mayor of Jonestown, Mississippi, through 1973.
- 1965: Luck Wing serves four terms as the Mayor of Sledge, Mississippi with a population of 600. Wing served as mayor and significantly changed the Chinese American experience in the Mississippi Delta.
- 1965: A group of mostly Filipino farm workers go on strike against growers of table grapes in California a strike which became known as the famous Delano grape strike they were led by the famous Filipino American activists and labor organizers Philip Vera Cruz and Larry Itliong.
- 1968: A series of strikes by the Third World Liberation Front, a group of ethnic minority students at San Francisco State University and at the University of California, Berkeley, leads to the creation of a College of Ethnic Studies and the beginning of the discipline of Asian American studies that soon becomes prevalent throughout the country.
- 1970s–1980s: Asians Americans created their own distinct genre of jazz and launched a musical movement based around it.
- 1971: Norman Mineta elected mayor of San Jose, California; becomes first Asian American mayor of a major US city; Herbert Choy nominated Supreme Court justice.
- 1972: Patsy Mink co-authors and sponsors the Title IX Amendment of the Higher Education Act and gets it effectively passed on June 23 the act was for the prohibition of gender discrimination in the US education system or other federally funded institutions. In the same year, Mink also becomes the first Asian American woman to run for President of the United States, participating in the Oregon Democratic Primary.
- 1973: Ruby Chow became the first Asian American elected to the King County Council in Washington State.
- 1973: The album A Grain of Sand: Music for the Struggle by Asians in America, created in support of the Asian American movement and other civil rights causes and widely regarded as one of the first recorded Asian American albums, is released.
- 1974: George Ariyoshi elected governor of Hawaii.
- 1974: Eduardo Malapit elected mayor of Kauai, the first Filipino American mayor in the United States.
- 1976: S. I. Hayakawa of California and Spark Matsunaga of Hawaiʻi elected as US Senators.
- 1977–1978: In June 1977, Reps. Frank Horton of New York and Norman Y. Mineta of California introduced a United States House of Representatives resolution to proclaim the first ten days of May as Asian-Pacific Heritage Week. A similar bill was introduced in the Senate a month later by Daniel Inouye and Spark Matsunaga. President Jimmy Carter signed a joint resolution for the celebration on October 5, 1978.
- 1978: Ellison Onizuka becomes the first Asian American astronaut.
- 1980s–present: Asian Americans have made dramatic advances as students and faculty in higher education, especially in California. There have been sharp debates regarding the existence of discrimination against high-performing Asians.
- 1980: Congress creates Commission on Wartime Relocation and Internment of Civilians to investigate internment of Japanese Americans; in 1983 it reports Japanese American internment was not a national security necessity.
- 1982: Vincent Chin, a Chinese American, was beaten to death in Highland Park, Michigan near Detroit. His murder became a rally point for Asian Americans. Vincent Chin's murder is often considered the beginning of a pan-ethnic Asian American movement.
- 1988: President Ronald Reagan signs Civil Liberties Act of 1988 apologizing for Japanese American internment and provide reparations of $20,000 to each victim.
- 1989: Michael Chang was the first Chinese American to win the French Open, and reached a career best ranking of world No. 2 in 1996.
- 1990: George H. W. Bush signed a bill passed by Congress to extend Asian American Heritage Week to a month; May was officially designated as Asian/Pacific American Heritage Month two years later.
- 1992: Eugene Chung is a former American football offensive lineman who played in the National Football League from 1992 to 1997.
- 1992: May was officially designated as Asian/Pacific American Heritage Month.
- 1992: Hae Jong Kim elected Bishop of United Methodist Church; Paull Shin elected for Washington State Senate; Jay Kim becomes first Korean American elected to Congress (CA-41); LA Riots of April 1992.
- 1993: Bobby Scott is elected to Congress from Virginia's 3rd congressional district. Scott is of African American and Filipino American descent, and is the first member of the United States Congress of Filipino ancestry.
- 1994: Ben Cayetano is elected Governor of Hawaii, becoming the first Filipino American to be elected governor of a state.
- 1996: Gary Locke is elected governor of Washington state. When he was elected in 1995 Locke became the first—and to date the only—Chinese American to serve as the governor of a state, holding the post for two terms.
- 1999: Gen. Eric Shinseki becomes the first Asian American US Army chief of staff.
- 1999: David Wu is elected as Congressman for Oregon's 1st District.

=== 21st century ===
- 2000: Norman Mineta. Democratic Congressman, appointed by President Bill Clinton as the first Asian American appointed to the US Cabinet; worked as Commerce Secretary (2000–2001), Transportation Secretary (2001–2006).
- 2000: Angela Perez Baraquio became the first Asian American, first Filipino American, and first teacher ever to have been crowned Miss America.
- 2001: Elaine Chao was appointed by President George W. Bush as the Secretary of Labor, serving to 2009. She is the first Asian American woman to serve in the Cabinet.
- 2002: less than a month after the death of Rep. Patsy Mink, Congress passed a resolution to rename Title IX the "Patsy Takemoto Mink Equal Opportunity in Education Act.
- 2003: Ignatius C. Wang is an American bishop of the Roman Catholic Church. He served as Auxiliary Bishop of the Archdiocese of San Francisco from 2002 to 2009.
- 2008: Cung Le, first Asian American to win a major mma title by defeating Frank Shamrock via TKO in Strikeforce.
- 2008: Bruce Reyes-Chow, third-generation Filipino and Chinese American, was elected as the moderator of 2 million members of the Presbyterian Church (USA).
- 2008: Tim Lincecum, a starting pitcher for the San Francisco Giants, is selected as an All Star for the Major League All Star Game. Lincecum, who is half-Filipino, also won the Cy Young award as the most successful pitcher in the National League in 2008. Lincecum is the first Asian American to be selected as the Cy Young winner. Lincecum also won the Cy Young again in 2009 and led the Giants to a World Series victory in 2010.
- 2009: Steven Chu, co-winner of the 1997 Nobel Prize for Physics, is sworn in as US Secretary of Energy—thereby becoming the first person appointed to the US Cabinet after having won a Nobel Prize. He is also the second Chinese American to become a member of Cabinet (after Elaine Chao).
- 2009: Joseph Cao, a Republican, is the first Vietnamese American and person born in Vietnam elected to the US House of Representatives, from Louisiana's 2nd congressional district; he was defeated for reelection in 2010.
- 2009: Judy Chu is the first Chinese American woman elected to the US Congress.
- 2009: Gary Locke is appointed by President Obama to serve as the Secretary of Commerce.
- 2009: Dr. Jim Yong Kim is appointed as President of Dartmouth College, becoming the first Asian American president of an Ivy League School.
- 2010: Immigration from Asia surpassed immigration from Latin America. Many of these immigrants are recruited by American companies from college campuses in India, China, and South Korea.
- 2010: Daniel Inouye is sworn in as President Pro Tempore making him one of the highest-ranking Asian American politicians ever.
- 2010: Far East Movement is the second Asian American band to top the Billboard 100, second only to Rocky Fellers with its song "Like a G6". The song was number one on two separate weeks in November 2010.
- 2010: Jeremy Lin is the first American-born Taiwanese to become an NBA player. Lin was a star basketball player for Harvard University and excelled at NBA pre-draft camps. Lin is currently a player for the Santa Cruz Warriors of the NBA G League.
- 2010: Jean Quan is elected as Mayor of Oakland, California. Quan is the first Asian American woman elected mayor of a major American city. Quan is Oakland's first Asian American mayor.
- 2010: Ed Lee is appointed as Mayor of San Francisco, California.
- 2010: Ed Wang was the first full-blooded Chinese player to both be drafted and to play in the NFL.
- 2011: Gary Locke becomes US Ambassador to the People's Republic of China.
- 2013: Nina Davuluri became the second Asian American and first Indian American to be crowned as Miss America. She is the second Asian American following Angela Perez Baraquio in 2000.
- 2015: Bobby Jindal, Governor of Louisiana (2008—2016), becomes the first Indian American to run for President of the United States, and is the first Asian American to run a nationwide campaign to seek the United States Presidency.
- 2016: Kamala Harris was elected to the United States Senate from California, and is the first Indian American to serve as a United States Senator.
- 2016: President-elect Donald Trump announces his intention to nominate Nikki Haley to serve as United States Ambassador to the United Nations. Haley is confirmed January 2017 and is the first Asian American and Indian American to serve as United Nations Ambassador.
- 2017: Elaine Chao was appointed by President Donald Trump to serve as the Secretary of Transportation.
- 2017: Simon Tam wins a unanimous case at the Supreme Court for Matal v. Tam (the right to register The Slants' trademark).
- 2018: Noel Francisco was appointed by President Donald Trump to serve as the Solicitor General.
- 2019: Kamala Harris becomes first Indian American woman to campaign for the President of the United States.
- 2021: Kamala Harris is sworn in as the first Indian American, African American, and female Vice President of the United States.
- 2021: Asian American and Pacific Islander Heritage Month was officially changed to Asian American, Native Hawaiian and Pacific Islander Heritage Month.
- 2024: Nikki Haley becomes the first Asian American in U.S. history to win a Republican presidential primary, with her victory in the District of Columbia primary on March 3.
- 2025: Usha Vance becomes the first Asian American Second Lady.

== See also ==
- East Asia–United States relations
- Asian Americans
- Asian American immigration history
- Asian American political history
- Military history of Asian Americans
- Asian Pacific American Heritage Month

Histories of specific ethnic/national subgroups:

- Afghan American history
- Bangladeshi American history
- Burmese American history
- Cambodian American history
- Chinese American history
- Filipino American history
- Immigration history of Hmong Americans
- Indian American history
- Japanese American history
- Korean American history
- Laotian American history
- Pakistani American history
- Sri Lankan American history
- Thai American history
- Tibetan American history
- Vietnamese American history
