= Peter Richardson (American director) =

American documentary film director

- Occupations: Film director, cinematographer, editor, & producer
- Years active: 2006 - Present
- Awards: 2011 Sundance Film Festival - Grand Jury Prize: Documentary

Peter Richardson is an American documentary film director. A native of Philomath, Oregon, Richardson is a 1998 graduate of Philomath High School and attended the University of Notre Dame on a scholarship. After graduating from Notre Dame with a Bachelor of Arts degree in Film Production & Theory, Richardson moved to Los Angeles where he worked for a short time at a publicity company before moving back to Oregon to start work on his first film. Richardson has directed two award-winning feature documentaries. His first film, Clear Cut: The Story of Philomath, Oregon debuted at the 2006 Sundance Film Festival. The film was later aired on the Sundance Channel. Richardson's second film, How to Die in Oregon, premiered on January 23 at the 2011 Sundance Film Festival. In addition to directing the film, Richardson also acted as cinematographer, editor, and producer on How to Die in Oregon. The critically acclaimed film went on to win the Grand Jury Prize in the US Documentary competition. The film premiered on HBO on May 26, 2011. Richardson was the cinematographer on Irene Taylor Brodsky's documentary short film, Saving Pelican 895, which aired on HBO on April 20, 2011.

== Filmography ==
Year	Film	Role
2006	Clear Cut: The Story of Philomath, Oregon	Director, producer, & editor
2011	How to Die in Oregon	Director, cinematographer, editor, & producer
2011	Saving Pelican 895	Cinematographer
2012	Doc Talk	Director
2014	One Last Hug; Three Days at Grief Camp	Cinematographer
2015	Belief	Director
2016	Dark Net	Director
2016	Speaking is Difficult	Cinematographer
