= Clearcut (disambiguation) =

Clearcut or clear cut refers to the forestry practice of clearcutting. It may also refer to:

- Clear Cut: The Story of Philomath, Oregon, a 2006 American documentary film
- Clear Cut Press, an American small press in Portland, Oregon
- Clearcut (film), a 1991 Canadian drama film
- Trümmerliteratur or "Clear-cutting literature", a German literary movement
