= Kevin Boss =

American football player (born 1984)

- Boss in 2010

No. 89, 87, 80
- Position: Tight end

Personal information
- Born: January 11, 1984 (age 42); Corvallis, Oregon, U.S.
- Listed height: 6 ft 6 in (1.98 m)
- Listed weight: 255 lb (116 kg)

Career information
- High school: Philomath (Philomath, Oregon)
- College: Western Oregon (2002–2006)
- NFL draft: 2007: 5th round, 153rd overall pick

Career history
- New York Giants (2007–2010); Oakland Raiders (2011); Kansas City Chiefs (2012)

Awards and highlights
- Super Bowl champion (XLII); Second-team All-GNAC; First-team All-American, All-GNAC, and All-Region

Career NFL statistics
- Receptions: 150
- Receiving yards: 2,033
- Receiving touchdowns: 22
- Stats at Pro Football Reference

Kevin Michael Boss (born January 11, 1984) is an American former professional football player who was a tight end in the National Football League (NFL). He played college football for the Western Oregon Wolves and was selected in the fifth round of the 2007 NFL draft by the New York Giants. With the Giants, he won Super Bowl XLII over the New England Patriots.

Boss also played for the Oakland Raiders and Kansas City Chiefs.

== Early life ==
Before enrolling at Western Oregon University, Boss played varsity level football at Philomath High School, becoming a stand-out tight end. In his junior year he was a second-team All-League choice as a tight end and defensive end and as a senior, he was an honorable mention All-State Class 3A choice and earned first-team All-ValCo League honors. For his accolades in football, he played in the Oregon Shrine East-West Football Game in Baker City.

Boss also took part in basketball, playing center. As a junior, Boss was awarded second-team All-League honors. Then as a senior, his team won the state title game (2002), picking up honorable mention All-State and All-League first-team accolades as well.

== College career ==
As a junior, Boss proved a multi-sport athlete for the Wolves, continuing his football and adding basketball to his regime. As a tight end, he started all team games, registering 39 receptions for 506 yards (13.0 average) and five touchdowns on the field earning first-team All-GNAC and All-Region accolades. On the basketball court he averaged 2.4 points and 2.0 rebounds a contest in 26 games.

In 2005, Boss finished second on the team with a career-high 53 receptions for 621 yards (11.7 average) and eight touchdowns. He also returned one punt for 13 yards, recorded four solo tackles and recovered one fumble, picking up first-team All-American, All-Region and All-GNAC honors, all in the eleven games he started for the Wolves. On the basketball court, Boss averaged 3.5 ppg (points per game), pulled down 90 rebounds and led the Wolves with seventeen blocked shots.

Known to teammates and Coaches as "Kev-Bo," Boss started 31 of 33 games in which he played. He ended his college career with 134 receptions for 1,590 yards (11.9 average) and 19 touchdowns. He was also credited with five solo tackles, recovering a pair of fumbles, and gaining 13 yards on one punt return as well. Boss graduated as a physical education major, with a minor in business, earning Academic All-District VIII honors with a 3.2 grade point average. Boss then declared himself eligible for the 2007 NFL draft.

== Professional career ==
=== New York Giants ===
Boss was selected in the fifth round (153rd overall) of the 2007 NFL draft by the New York Giants and was the second player ever drafted out of Western Oregon. Boss made his first career catch on November 11, 2007, in a regular season game against the Dallas Cowboys that went for 18 yards. He soon took over for an injured Jeremy Shockey as the starting tight end and brought in nine passes and two touchdowns to end the regular season. In the Giants' first postseason game against the Tampa Bay Buccaneers, Boss racked up two receptions for 14 yards in a 24–14 victory. Boss went on to gain two more receptions in the Divisional and Conference rounds of the playoffs against the Dallas Cowboys and the Green Bay Packers respectively.

Boss and his team then went on to Super Bowl XLII in Glendale, Arizona, where they were matched up against the previously undefeated New England Patriots. Boss only caught one reception, but took his opportunity and sprinted for a 45-yard gain that would eventually set up a five-yard touchdown pass. It was the longest play from scrimmage in the game. The Giants would go on to defeat the Patriots 17–14.

Entering Giants mini-camp, Boss arrived weighing 272 pounds, a significant increase in weight compared to the previous year. Since Jeremy Shockey was traded to the Saints, he was the starting tight end. Boss showed flashes of his athletic ability, especially during Week 10 against the Eagles when he leaped over a defender (without being touched) on a 3rd down play. He finished the game with six catches for 63 yards and a touchdown in a winning effort for his team. He ended the season with 33 receptions for 384 yards (11.6 average) and was the team leader with six touchdowns.

=== Oakland Raiders ===
On August 5, 2011, Boss signed a four-year contract worth $16 million with the Oakland Raiders. His first touchdown with the Raiders came on October 16, versus the Cleveland Browns, a 35-yard effort on faked field goal pass from Raiders punter Shane Lechler.

The Raiders released Boss on March 12, 2012.

=== Kansas City Chiefs ===
Boss signed with the Kansas City Chiefs on March 15, 2012. Boss was expected to share the starting tight end role with Tony Moeaki. Boss caught his first catch and touchdown as a Chief in week 1 in the 2012 NFL season.

The Chiefs released Boss on February 19, 2013.

== NFL career statistics ==
Legend
**Bold**	Career high

=== Regular season ===
Year	Team	GP	GS	Rec	Yds	Avg	Lng	TD
2007	NYG	13	2	9	118	13.1	23	2
2008	NYG	15	15	33	384	11.6	28	**6**
2009	NYG	15	15	**42**	**567**	13.5	35	5
2010	NYG	15	13	35	531	15.2	**54**	5
2011	OAK	14	11	28	368	13.1	35	3
2012	KC	2	2	3	65	**21.7**	29	1
Total		74	58	150	2,033	13.6	54	22

=== Postseason ===
Year	Team	GP	GS	Rec	Yds	Avg	Lng	TD
2007	NYG	4	4	**5**	**90**	**18.0**	**45**	0
2008	NYG	1	1	3	52	17.3	25	0
Total		5	5	8	142	17.8	45	0

== Personal life ==
Boss is the son of Teresa and Bob Boss. He has an older brother, Terry, who played professional soccer for the Charlotte Eagles, the Puerto Rico Islanders, the New York Red Bulls and Seattle Sounders FC and made seven appearances for the Puerto Rican national team before retiring due to a history of concussions. Terry is currently the head men's soccer coach at Oregon State University in his hometown. Kevin Boss married his college sweetheart Breanna Ramsey on July 4, 2009, in McMinnville, Oregon.

Boss, who resides in Bend, Oregon during the offseason, graduated in December 2006 from Western Oregon University in Monmouth, Oregon, with a degree in physical education.

Boss is the founder and owner of Boss Sports Performance, a sports training facility in Bend, OR. The facility trains athletes of all ages, from youth to professional athletes.
