= Philomath High School =

Location
- 2054 Applegate Street; Philomath, Benton, Oregon 97370; United States; 44.537888°N 123.356064°W

Information
- School district: Philomath School District
- Principal: Mark Henderson
- Teaching staff: 26.91 (FTE)
- Grades: 9–12
- Enrollment: 469 (2023–2024)
- Student to teacher ratio: 17.43
- Colors: Black and Gold
- Athletics conference: OSAA 4A-3 Oregon West Conference
- Mascot: Warrior
- Team name: Warriors
- Website: www.philomathsd.net/philomath-hs-home

Philomath High School is a public high school in Philomath, Oregon, United States.

== History ==
=== Founding ===
The first high school in Philomath opened in 1911. The current campus opened in 1956.

=== Clemens Grant ===
The Clemens Foundation was established in 1958 by Rex and Ethel Clemens, members of the Philomath community who acquired their wealth in the timber industry. The foundation was established to provide funding for Philomath-area schools, including a college scholarship fund set up for graduates of Philomath High School. The controversy surrounding the scholarship was the subject of the documentary Clear Cut: The Story of Philomath, Oregon.

=== New construction ===
In May 2010, a $29.5 million bond was passed to renovate and improve four of the school's older buildings. About $20 million was used for the project. This was the biggest and most expensive project in the school district's history.

== Academics ==
In 2016, 90.9% of the school's seniors received their high school diplomas.

In 2019, 100% of the school's 119 seniors received their high school diploma.

== Athletics ==
Philomath High School athletic teams compete in the OSAA 4A-3 Oregon West Conference. The school's athletic director is Mike Hood.

State Championships:

- Boys Basketball: 2002, 2014, 2016
- Band: 2018, 2019
- Boys Soccer: 2012, 2021
- Boys Track and Field: 1972, 2011
- Boys Cross Country: 1993, 2003, 2010, 2019
- Choir: 2017
- Dance/Drill: 1995, 1996
- Football: 1939, 1988
- Girls Basketball: 1986, 1987, 2000, 2022
- Girls Soccer: 2008
- Girls Track and Field: 1990, 1991, 1995, 2010, 2022, 2023, 2024, 2025
- Girls Combined (Para athlete) Track and Field: 2024
- Girls Cross Country: 1984, 1985, 1986, 1988, 1989, 1990, 2001, 2003, 2023, 2024
- Volleyball: 1986
- Wrestling: 1994

== Varsity football scandal ==
In July 2016, six Philomath High School varsity football players and one coach were cited in connection with “aggravated hazing” incidents at Camp Rilea in Clatsop County. The incidents involved at least 11 alleged victims. The six youths have been cited on charges that, if committed by adults, would constitute the crimes of harassment and assault. All the harassment or attempted harassment charges involve "offensive physical contact with intimate parts," Benton County District Attorney John Haroldson said, adding that the charges are either Class A or Class B misdemeanors.

== Notable alumni ==
- Erica Bartolina – Olympic pole vaulter
- Terry Boss – former pro goalkeeper and soccer player
- Kevin Boss – former pro football player for the Oakland Raiders and New York Giants
- Tami Maida – the first known quarterback to also become homecoming princess
- Peter Richardson – documentary film director
- Mike Thurman – former pro baseball player for the Montreal Expos and New York Yankees

== See also ==
- Education in the United States
