= Tomorrow Another Day =

Studio album by Debra Arlyn
- Released: March 27, 2008 (US)
- Recorded: 2007 & 2008; 8Ball Studios
- Genre: Pop, R&B
- Length: 47:43
- Label: Homeslice Records
- Producer: Rob Stroup, Debra Arlyn

Debra Arlyn chronology
Complicated Mess (2006)	Tomorrow Another Day (2008)	The Get Ready EP (2009)

Tomorrow Another Day is the third studio album by singer/songwriter Debra Arlyn. It was released independently by Homeslice Records in the United States on March 27, 2008.

== Background ==
Arlyn had recorded and released her second studio album Complicated Mess in 2006 with the purpose of trying to secure a record deal, but when that fell through she returned home to Oregon and began working on her next album while continuing to tour to support herself. During touring, she'd practice and write material that would ultimately end up on Tomorrow Another Day. Arlyn also made more of an effort to do co-writing sessions after the self-penned Complicated Mess, writing three songs with different co-writers, including Dapo Torimiro, Ben Margulies and Steve Sundholm. Arlyn sought out a new producer after exhausting herself self-producing her last album and met Rob Stroup, who became the lead producer for the album. Recording was handled at Stroup's 8Ball Studios in Portland, Oregon.

In the period after releasing Complicated Mess in 2006, Arlyn met her future husband and the two were married around their second anniversary, a few weeks after the release of Tomorrow Another Day in March 2008. After the wedding, Arlyn would continue to tour constantly and working on new material for an EP release in 2009.

== Songs and themes ==
The songs on the album largely revolve around love, relationships and romantic themes. Most songs were written based on experiences Arlyn had with former boyfriends, her husband and fictional relationships. Songs are based around piano composition, which is Arlyn's primary instrument.

== Track listing ==
No.	Title	Writer(s)	Length
1.	"Worth the Wait"	Debra Arlyn, Dapo Torimiro	3:34
2.	"Forever"	Debra Arlyn	4:02
3.	"Let Me Down"	Debra Arlyn	4:30
4.	"The Letter"	Debra Arlyn	4:35
5.	"Not Enough"	Debra Arlyn	3:46
6.	"New Favorite Song"	Debra Arlyn, Steve Sundholm	3:13
7.	"Does It Really Matter?"	Debra Arlyn, Ben Margulies	4:42
8.	"Say Goodbye"	Debra Arlyn	3:48
9.	"Tell Me Now"	Debra Arlyn	3:57
10.	"Through to Me"	Debra Arlyn	3:49
11.	"Unspoken"	Debra Arlyn	3:37
12.	"Tomorrow Another Day"	Debra Arlyn	4:11

== Personnel ==
=== Musicians ===
- Debra Arlyn: Vocals, Piano
- Jean-Pierre Garau: Additional keyboards
- Enrique Gonzalez: Drums
- Matt Voth: Bass
- Bob Dunham: Guitar
- Steve Cannon: Trumpet
- Renato Caranto: Sax
- Rob Stroup: Percussion

=== Production ===
- Rob Stroup: Producer, Mixing
- Debra Arlyn: Producer
- Tony Arlyn: Executive Producer, Management
- Ed Brooks: Mastering
- Shawn St. Peter: Album Photography
- Chris Gutendorf: Layout & Design
