= Rick Kirkham =

American journalist

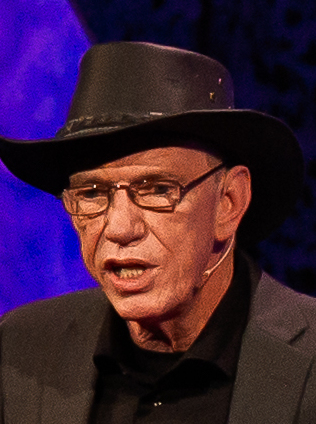
- Kirkham at TEDxArendal, Norway, 2021
- Born: Richard Allen Kirkham; May 16, 1958 (age 68); Oklahoma, U.S.
- Occupation: Film producer
- Known for: TV Junkie and Tiger King
- Spouse: Tammie (m. 1990; div. 2001) Kristin Rosøy Kirkham (m. 2018)
- Children: 2

Richard Allen Kirkham (born May 16, 1958) is an American film producer, writer, cinematographer and journalist who is best known for his documentary TV Junkie and appearance in the Netflix documentary Tiger King.

== Early life ==
Kirkham was born in Oklahoma in 1958. He became interested in making films at a young age, and began recording home videos of himself. From the age of 14, Kirkham filmed more than 3,000 hours of a video diary. After graduating college, Kirkham got his first job; a crime reporter at a Las Vegas NBC affiliate.

== Career ==
=== Anchor and TV Junkie ===
Kirkham was hired by Inside Edition as an anchor, where he interviewed celebrities like James Brown and Chuck Norris. At one point during this stint, while he was high, Kirkham interviewed then-president George H. W. Bush about drug abuse. He also did a series of stunts during his tenure including being shot out of a cannon, set on fire, and wrestling a nine-foot alligator.

After marrying his first wife and right before the birth of his first child, Kirkham checked into rehab at the encouragement of Inside Edition producers. However, Kirkham's cocaine use eventually caused him to be fired from Inside Edition and subsequent jobs, and divorced from his first wife.

Footage from Kirkham's 3,000 hour-long video diary was used in TV Junkie, a film about Kirkham's life and drug use. The film received mainly positive reviews; Film Threat found it "an unbelievably candid glimpse into the contradictions of cocaine addiction", and praised Kirkham's articulate and authentic self-portrait.

He appeared on The Oprah Winfrey Show in 2007 to talk about his addiction, and clips of his video diary were shown. On Oprah, Kirkham said he was a functional addict, and that he would smoke crack at night instead of sleeping, remaining high for about six hours, and report for work at Inside Edition two hours later. Kirkham went days without sleep during this time. Kirkham began to speak publicly about his drug use to young adults.

=== Involvement in Tiger King ===
In 2014, Kirkham received numerous requests to become the producer for a reality show featuring Joe Exotic, the operator of the Greater Wynnewood Exotic Animal Park. After taking the job, Kirkham moved into the G.W. Zoo and lived there until his departure in 2015. During his tenure at the zoo, Kirkham witnessed Exotic's erratic behaviour towards his animals, and recalled a time he witnessed him promising a woman he'd take care of her horse, only to immediately kill it. In March 2015, a suspected arson fire destroyed the studio at the G.W. Zoo, killing the zoo's alligators in the Steve Irwin Memorial complex, and destroying all of Kirkham's footage. Upon hearing about the fire, Kirkham dropped to his knees and cried, and left the zoo not long afterwards. Following the fire and witnessing Exotic's behaviour towards his animals, Kirkham spent six months in therapy, including a week-long stay in a psychiatric facility.

Kirkham was later interviewed by Eric Goode and Rebecca Chaiklin for their Netflix documentary Tiger King. As an interviewee, Kirkham did not receive royalties from the show, but allowed Goode and Chaiklin to use footage of Exotic he owned for a few thousand dollars. Kirkham is featured prominently throughout the documentary, recounting the rise and fall of "Joe Exotic TV", a podcast-like production that Kirkham hoped to develop into a TV series, before his footage was mysteriously destroyed. Kirkham claimed to have "never experienced anything like Joe Exotic" and denied involvement in the 2015 G.W. Zoo fire. He also claimed that Travis Maldonado wasn't gay.

After the success of Tiger King, Kirkham was interviewed about his time at the G.W. Zoo by various media personalities. During an interview with David Spade, Kirkham remarked, "There was footage in there of Exotic actually killing animals for fun. In the course of my year, he walked up to a tiger he didn't like and just shot it in the head." He gave an example of Exotic being cruel to his animals by telling the story of a woman who brought an old horse in a trailer to the G.W. Zoo; "She told Joe that she could no longer care for the animal and asked him if he'd take it and give it a good home. He hugged her and told her everything would be fine. He told her to leave the horse and the trailer and they'd put it out to pasture and give it a good place to live. As soon as the lady left the park, Exotic said, 'Rick, grab your camera. Start rollin'.' He walks up to the horse trailer, pulls his revolver out, shoots the horse in the head dead and laughs. Just laughs. That was Joe Exotic. And of course, he fed that horse to the lions." Kirkham also claimed that things were "a hell of a lot worse" than what's depicted in Tiger King; ""[Watching Tiger King], you kinda had a little bit of a heart for the guy, but you really didn't realize or get to see how evil he really could be, not only to animals, but to people."

On June 2, 2020, Discovery ID channel released a one-hour show called "The Truth Behind Joe Exotic: The Rick Kirkham Story", where he discussed his life, two marriages and move to Norway. Kirkham also appeared in the June 2020 documentary Surviving Joe Exotic.

== Personal life ==
In the 1990s, Kirkham married Tammie, with whom he has two children. She divorced Kirkham in 2001 following his drug abuse, and later filed a lawsuit against the producers of TV Junkie.

In 2018, Kirkham married Kristin Rosøy. The couple live in Bodø Municipality in Norway. Kirkham works as a freelance reporter for BODØ NU, and continues his job as a producer, director, and cinematographer, working at RealReels Productions and Consulting.
