= Philomath School District =

School district in Oregon, USA

District information
- Grades: K-12
- Superintendent: Susan Halliday

Students and staff
- Students: 1,635

Other information
- Website: www.philomath.k12.or.us

The Philomath School District is a school district in the U.S. state of Oregon that serves part of Benton County, including the city of Philomath and the unincorporated community of Blodgett. The district has an enrollment of 1,635 students.

== Schools ==
The district operates 6 schools.

=== Elementary schools ===
- Clemens Primary School (K–2)
- Blodgett Elementary School (K–4)
- Philomath Elementary School (3–5)

=== Middle schools ===
- Philomath Middle School (6 - 8)

=== High schools ===
- Philomath High School (9–12)

== Charter schools ==
- Kings Valley Charter School (Pre-K through 12th grade)

== See also ==
- List of school districts in Oregon
