= Complicated Mess =

Studio album by Debra Arlyn
- Released: August 8, 2006 (US)
- Recorded: 2006; Recording; Homeslice Studios
- Genre: Pop, R&B
- Length: 35:35
- Label: Homeslice Records
- Producer: Debra Arlyn

Debra Arlyn chronology
Thinking Out Loud (2005)	Complicated Mess (2006)	Tomorrow Another Day (2008)

Complicated Mess is the second studio album of American singer-songwriter Debra Arlyn. It was released independently by Homeslice Records in the United States on August 8, 2006.

== Background ==
Debra Arlyn released her first independent album, Thinking Out Loud, in 2005 and took the album to Los Angeles in hopes of securing a major label record deal. Feedback from the managers and labels at the time was that her look and sound were good, but she'd have to focus on her songwriting. After returning to Oregon, she began writing and touring locally to begin work on her next album, Complicated Mess. Complicated Mess was written and produced with a sounding commercial to appeal to major record labels for another round of showcasing. Arlyn recorded the album at home in her studio with her touring band and produced the album herself.

When the album was completed, she began another round of label showcasing and played for many different major labels but did not secure a record deal. Returning to Oregon, she decided to continue with music and focused on being an independent artist and touring to support herself. Arlyn did garner some success from the album when tracks such as "Why Can't We Start Over?" were featured on the television show Related.

== Songs and themes ==
The songs on the album largely revolve around love, relationships, and romantic themes. Most songs were written based on Arlyn's experiences with current and former boyfriends. Songs are based around piano composition, which is Arlyn's primary instrument.

== Track listing ==
All songs written by Debra Arlyn

No.	Title	Length
1.	"Let It Go"	3:35
2.	"Fine"	3:13
3.	"Complicated Mess"	3:34
4.	"Circles"	2:50
5.	"Why Can't We Start Over?"	3:01
6.	"I'll Walk Away"	3:40
7.	"The One"	4:24
8.	"Words I Never Meant"	3:23
9.	"Fall Apart"	3:46
10.	"Roll On"	4:07

== Personnel ==
=== Musicians ===
- Debra Arlyn: Vocals, Piano, Synth, Clav, Rhodes
- Lance Seiders: Bass
- Kevin Colis: Guitar (tracks 1,5,6,9)
- Christian Kremer: Guitar (tracks 2,3,4,7,8,10)
- David Samuel: Guitar (tracks 3,7)
- James West: Drums (tracks 1,6,9)
- Kevin Van Walk: Drums (tracks 2,3,4,7,8,10)
- Matt Kimmel: Drums (track 5)
- Tim Mclaughlin: Horns (track 8)
- Matt Calkins: Horns (track 8)

=== Production ===
- Debra Arlyn: Producer
- Steve Sundholm: Masterer and mixer
- Lance Seiders: Engineer
- Jeff Xandier: Photography
- Christian Shope: Additional photography
- Tony Arlyn: Management
