= Dark Net (TV series) =

Documentary series

- Genre: Documentary
- Created by: Mati Kochavi
- Narrated by: Lauren Terp
- Country of origin: United States
- Original language: English
- No. of seasons: 2
- No. of episodes: 16

Production
- Executive producers: Mati Kochavi; Danna Rabin; Vivian Schiller; David Shadrack Smith
- Camera setup: Single-camera
- Running time: 30 minutes
- Production companies: Vocativ; Part2 Pictures

Original release
- Network: Showtime
- Release: January 21, 2016 – May 25, 2017

Dark Net is an American documentary television series created by Mati Kochavi that explores the dark web and technology, and themes such as biohacking, cyber-kidnapping, digital warfare, online cults, pornography addiction, and webcam strippers. The series premiered on January 21, 2016, on Showtime, with the first season consisting of eight episodes. Its second season, consisting of eight episodes, premiered on April 6, 2017.

== Production ==
Showtime greenlit the series in November 2015. It was created by Mati Kochavi, the founder of Vocativ, and is co-produced by Part2 Pictures. The series was renewed for a second season in March 2016.

== Reception ==
The series has received generally positive reviews from critics. On Metacritic, it has a score of 69 out of 100 based on six reviews. Keith Uhlich of The Hollywood Reporter gave it a positive review, calling it "compelling" and wrote, "Contemplation and condemnation, all wrapped up into one, with no easy answers at the end of it all. The fact that Dark Net never allows you to entirely pin down its perspective keeps the proceedings riveting." Brian Lowry of Variety gave it a more mixed review and wrote, "Other than acknowledging that these subcultures exist, what Dark Net doesn't do is shed much light on them."

== International broadcast ==
The series premiered in Canada on The Movie Network on January 21, 2016, simultaneous with the American broadcast.

== Episodes ==
=== Series overview ===
Season	Episodes	Originally released	
Season	Episodes	First released	Last released
1	8	January 21, 2016	March 10, 2016
2	8	April 6, 2017	May 25, 2017

=== Season 1 (2016) ===
No. overall	No. in season	Title	Directed by	Written by	Original release date	US viewers (millions)
1	1	"Crush"	Peter Richardson	Jeremy Siefer	January 21, 2016	0.126
This episode focuses on a BDSM couple in a long-distance relationship; a Japanese man in a virtual relationship by using LovePlus; and a woman who was a victim of revenge porn.
2	2	"Upgrade"	Peter Richardson	Gemma Jordan	January 28, 2016	0.073
The central theme is biohacking, including a woman who implants an RFID chip in her hand and a man who lost an eye in accident replacing it with a camera. Also, a man who uses hundreds of data collection systems to track everything in his life.
3	3	"Exploit"	Peter Richardson	Billy Shebar	February 4, 2016	0.105
Documenting cyber child pornography in Cebu, Philippines via the dark web. Also, technology used to protect children online and catch the perpetrators is shown, and a pedophile reveals the reasons for his addiction.
4	4	"CTRL"	Peter Richardson	Holly Taylor	February 11, 2016	0.055
Focusing on the job of content moderators on the Internet and explores computer hackers.
5	5	"Trapped"	Peter Richardson	Aaron Lubarsky	February 18, 2016	0.046
This episode explores a woman who believes she suffers from electromagnetic hypersensitivity; a man who suffered a massive stroke and is now paralyzed, who uses technology to improve and aid in his life; and a woman who deserted her family to join an online cult.
6	6	"Rewire"	Peter Richardson	Marcella Steingart	February 25, 2016	0.037
Explorations of Internet pornography addiction, nootropics, and people with autism working in the technology industry.
7	7	"Provoke"	Peter Richardson	William Acks	March 3, 2016	0.069
Violence and trolling via social media and the creator and mission behind the online character of Abdullah-X.
8	8	"Revolt"	Peter Richardson	Alexandra Meistrell	March 10, 2016	0.052
This episode documents an activist who documents police brutality; a transgender woman (Abby Stein) who turned away from Hasidic Judaism once discovering the Internet; and an organization who uses 3D printing technology to build untraceable, undetectable guns.

=== Season 2 (2017) ===
No. overall	No. in season	Title	Directed by	Written by	Original release date	US viewers (millions)
9	1	"My Mind"	Jeremy Siefer	Allison Koch	April 6, 2017	N/A
This episode explores using virtual reality to help with posttraumatic stress disorder, RealDolls with artificial intelligence, and a woman who works for Amazon Mechanical Turk.
10	2	"My Justice"	Jeremy Siefer; Peter Richardson	Alex Meistrell	April 13, 2017	N/A
This episode documents online amateur sleuths (Websleuths) regarding the death of Morgan Ingram and its effect on the accused killer who was deemed innocent; and "Commander X", a member of hacktivist group Anonymous who fled the United States having been arrested for a cyber attack.
11	3	"My Money"	Jeremy Siefer; Peter Richardson	William Acks	April 20, 2017	N/A
This episode explores a camgirl, bitcoin miners, and darknet markets.
12	4	"My Nation"	Jeremy Siefer	Gemma Jordan	April 27, 2017	N/A
This episode documents political movements and extremist groups, including an Alt-right group who spread their message via social media, and former members of extremist groups such Neo-Nazis (including Christian Picciolini) and Al-Qaeda who are now non-radicalized.
13	5	"My Identity"	Jeremy Siefer	France Costrel	May 4, 2017	N/A
This episode explores facial recognition technology and its use in law enforcement, homes, and casinos. An innocent man tells his story after facial recognition technology incorrectly tied him to a bank robbery and how it has ruined his life, leaving him homeless. Also explored is the issue of privacy in the age of social media.
14	6	"My Home"	Jeremy Siefer; Peter Richardson	Jeremy Siefer; Eric Strauss	May 11, 2017	N/A
This episode discuses issues of privacy and surveillance within homes and communities; including a woman whose laptop webcam is infiltrated by a digital stalker; a neighborhood which takes it upon themselves to install surveillance cameras for safety; and a man whose interest in voyeurism now has him labeled as a sex offender living under constant surveillance.
15	7	"My Community"	Jeremy Siefer; Peter Richardson	Erin Crumpacker; Jackie Hurwitz	May 18, 2017	N/A
This episode explores the town of Jun, Granada which uses Twitter as its main source of communication between residents and the government; a teacher in Ahwatukee, Phoenix who is digitally harassed; and a father of one of the children killed in the Sandy Hook Elementary School shooting who faces threats from conspiracy theorists.
16	8	"My Relationship"	Jeremy Siefer	Allison Koch; Alexandra Meistrell	May 25, 2017	N/A
This episode explores relationships in the digital age; a Japanese family who have an AI robot as part of their family; a woman who has programmed her dead friend into a chatbot; and a mother who uses a spy program to monitor her teenage daughter's activities on her phone.
