= Debra Arlyn =

American singer-songwriter and pianist

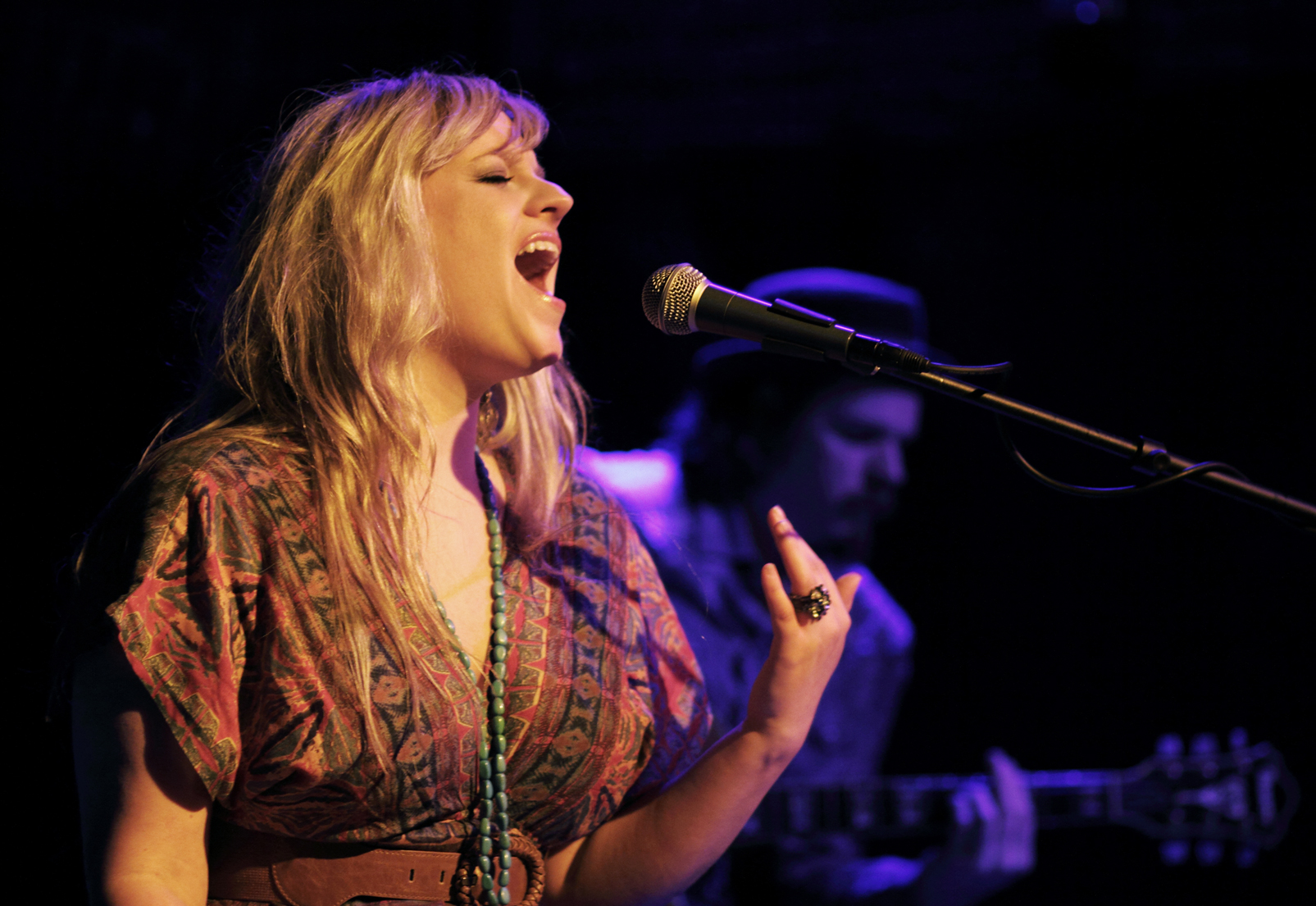
- Debra Arlyn performing on stage in February 2011

Background information
- Born: Debra Irene Arlyn; February 27, 1986 (age 39); Corvallis, Oregon, U.S.
- Genres: Pop, adult contemporary, R&B
- Occupations: Singer-songwriter, musician
- Instruments: Vocals, piano
- Years active: 2006–present
- Labels: Homeslice Records
- Website: debraarlyn.com

Debra Irene Arlyn (born February 27, 1986) is an American singer-songwriter and pianist from Oregon. Her musical style is a blend of pop, adult contemporary, jazz and R&B, arranged and performed on piano, with lyrics that deal with love and relationships. She is noted for having a powerful voice. She has independently released three albums and one EP.

== Early life ==
Debra Arlyn was born on February 27, 1986, in Corvallis, Oregon, to Valerie, a homemaker, and to Tony, a musician/businessman. She is of Polish and Irish descent. She grew up in Corvallis and spent her time growing up singing in school and church choirs. When she was 15 she began to teach herself to play piano by ear on her family's baby grand piano and writing her own music and songs, inspired by such artists as Carole King and Fiona Apple. By 18, she was performing at local talent shows and church events.

During her senior year of high school, a local radio station had a talent contest called "Oregon Idol" where the winner would get a fast track to perform for producers at the season 2 American Idol auditions in California. Arlyn entered and won the contest; she was flown to the producer's audition for American Idol, along with other radio contest winners. Despite winning the contest and being pushed ahead through auditions, Arlyn was cut after two rooms and did not make it to the final judges (Randy Jackson, Simon Cowell and Paula Abdul).

== Career ==
Arlyn returned to Oregon, where local musicians and talent managers were interested in working with Arlyn following the local exposure she had. She ended up going to Nashville to record a collection of songs for a demo CD called, That Girl is Me which she sold locally. After that demo, Arlyn enrolled into a local college but left after a year to focus on music full-time. Arlyn enrolled her father to be her manager and she wrote songs that would end up on her debut CD, Thinking Out Loud. During this time, Arlyn decided to focus on playing and writing music locally rather than moving to Los Angeles or Nashville, traveling to Los Angeles and Nashville when needed for meetings or co-writing sessions.

With the independently produced Thinking Out Loud Arlyn traveled to Los Angeles and Nashville looking for a record deal or big management. Feedback from labels and managers was Arlyn needed to focus on her songwriting, so she set up co-writing sessions with other artists to form material for her next release, Complicated Mess. Complicated Mess was made in mind as a commercial album to sell herself to major labels, and was produced by Arlyn herself in her home with her band on her own independent label. When Complicated Mess was released she made rounds in Los Angeles again for a record deal, and played for labels like Epic, Capitol, Columbia and Interscope Records, but she did not secure a deal.

After that round of label showcasing and horror stories from friends about their record deals gone bad, Arlyn returned to Portland with a focus on developing as a local artist and constantly touring to support herself financially. She also began actively entering songwriting and music contests, winning in competitions like The John Lennon Songwriting Contest. During this time she also sold music to movies and television shows such as "Related", "Keeping Up with the Kardashians" and Valley of Angels, as well as scoring a documentary, Clear Cut: The Story of Philomath, Oregon. She also began work for her next album, Tomorrow Another Day.

Tomorrow Another Day released in April 2008. In that same month, Arlyn married her boyfriend of two years in a ceremony in Corvallis. She toured to support the album while also releasing an EP in late 2009 and kept touring until finding out she was pregnant in February 2010. Arlyn gave birth to a daughter, Evie, later in the year. Still writing, she will begin production of new album in the summer of 2011 in Nashville.

"Heartbeat" LP recorded in Nashville was released in March 2012. Arlyn had a big release concert at her favorite Portland venue Jimmy Maks to celebrate the release. A Portland music blogger was at the live show and wrote a positive review of Arlyn and the band saying "Damn. This girl can sing! A strong, soulful voice and range out the wazoo! Perfectly delicate at times and awesomely powerful at others. She filled every corner of the room and I could have listened to her sing for hours. Debra and her band boasted a poppy, soulful, R&B vibe. Smooth grooves. Catchy, clever arrangements. All of this coupled with a very well-blended and balanced mix, made for a very warm and pleasurable sound. Plenty of organ and guitar solos. The audience (including me) was into everything Debra was serving."

After the show, Arlyn again took a break from music, had another daughter Chloe, and moved to Walla Walla, Washington to start a business with her husband. In 2016 she recorded new material and released several live music videos to showcase the new look and new sound of her voice and songwriting. "Boomerang" and "Under the Porchlight" being the 2 stand out songs and videos.

== Discography ==
- 2003: That Girl Is Me
- 2005: Thinking Out Loud
- 2006: Complicated Mess
- 2008: Tomorrow Another Day
- 2009: The Get Ready EP
- 2012: Heartbeat
- 2016: Boomerang music video
- 2016: Under the Porchlight music video
