= Gene Tools =

Biotechnology company

Gene Tools, LLC
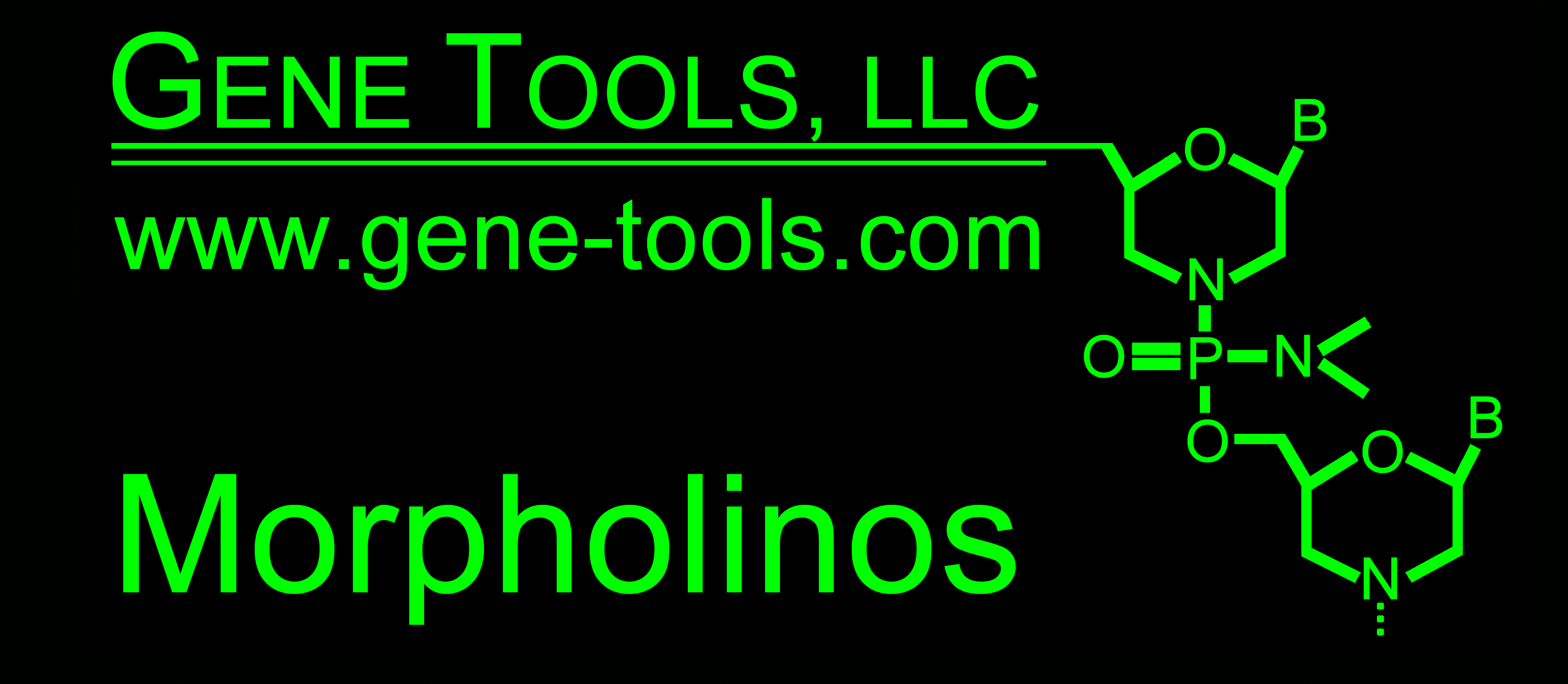
- Headquarters: Philomath, Oregon
- Website: www.gene-tools.com

Gene Tools, LLC is a limited liability company located in Philomath, Oregon, United States that manufactures Morpholino antisense oligos and delivery reagents. Gene Tools was founded in 1997 and began regularly shipping custom-sequence Morpholino oligos in 2000. Current products include Morpholino oligos and Vivo-Morpholinos (for improved delivery into cells).

The manager and general partner, Jim Summerton, is a pioneer in antisense research, conceived of and was co-inventor of the Morpholino antisense oligo structural type and founded the first antisense therapeutics company, Sarepta Therapeutics Inc. (formerly AntiVirals Inc., renamed AVI BioPharma Inc., renamed Sarepta Therapeutics Inc.).
