= How to Die in Oregon =

2011 American documentary film

- Directed by: Peter Richardson
- Produced by: Peter Betty
- Starring: Cody Curtis
- Music by: Max Richter
- Distributed by: Clearcut Productions
- Release date: January 23, 2011 (Sundance)
- Running time: 107 minutes
- Country: United States
- Language: English
- Budget: $750,000

How to Die in Oregon is a 2011 American documentary film produced and directed by Peter Richardson. It is set in the U.S. state of Oregon and covers the state's Death with Dignity Act that allows terminally ill patients to self-administer barbiturates prescribed by their physician to end their own life, referred to as assisted suicide by opponents and medical aid in dying by proponents.

Richardson spent nearly a year with 54-year-old Cody Curtis, an OHSU faculty member with liver cancer, as she grappled with the decision of whether or not to take a lethal dose of a barbiturate.

== Release ==
The film was released in January 2011 at the 27th Sundance Film Festival and began airing on HBO later in the year. Peter Richardson, a native Oregonian, got the idea to produce the film as the state's law was upheld by the Supreme Court of the United States in the 2006 case Gonzales v. Oregon.

== Critical reception ==
How to Die in Oregon was well received by critics, currently holding a 100% "fresh" rating on Rotten Tomatoes based on 11 reviews.

The film won the Grand Jury Prize for Documentaries at the 27th Sundance Film Festival.

Awards
Preceded by Restrepo	Sundance Grand Jury Prize: U.S. Documentary; 2011	Succeeded by The House I Live In
