= Chinese in the California gold rush =

The California gold rush (1848–1855) was a period of American history in which the most gold seen at the time was discovered. The initial discovery of gold in America in 1848 attracted many immigrants who were intent on the opportunity and potential wealth that came with gold mining. Typically the people that came to America were from the British Isles and the Asia-Pacific region. These foreign miners initially worked in small-scale operations using placer deposits found along streams. As mining technology developed over time and placer deposits slowly depleted mining became corporate, paving the way for quartz mining to take the forefront of gold production.

The goldfields in California were in the public domain, so miners were operating on federal land. However, Congress passed no legislation regulating property rights for miners until 1866. Miners could hold their own assemblies and pass rules surrounding claims, this technicality paved the way for miners to operate on a claims system. Chinese immigrants participated in every facet of gold production in the later years of the gold rush. Within the claims system that grew in popularity, Chinese immigrants were contracted to find gold from 1849–1850. In the first three years of the Gold Rush, Chinese impact was minimal and most were driven out of the country by white Americans threatening violence. However, starting in 1852 the Chinese population in the American West spiked and Chinese Gold miners made up 25% of miners at their highest and their impact was felt across California.

== Historiography ==
Chinese immigrants remain marginal figures in American understandings of the gold rush despite their presence in the labor force. Traditionally, they are understood as products or victims of American xenophobia as opposed to people with the agency in their labor and being. This has been attributed to historians' interest in policy affecting Chinese people which has led to little empirical research done on Chinese immigrants' labor experience. Most of the understanding of Chinese labor stems from contextualizing it under the impression that mining was unfree labor for immigrants. This idea was introduced in 1964 by Gunther Barth’s Bitter Strength. He debated labor patterns in Chinese immigrants that put them in a large amount of debt was a form of debt bondage. The historiography of Chinese immigrants in the gold rush in California has since evolved to acknowledge immigration was optional, but the position that their labor was unfree is still vehemently held by orthodox scholars. Contemporary historians like Sucheng Chan and Mae Ngai however, claim that this understanding of immigrant labor are hindered by an orientalist blind spot and perpetuate harmful stereotypes about Chinese immigrants that were prevalent during the gold rush.

== Order of arrival and geographical patterns ==
The first Chinese miners in California are thought to have been a group of around 60 contracted miners who arrived in Tuolumne County in 1849. They were hired by British people in Shanghai under a contract that gave them passage money in return for their money to be paid back via monthly wage deductions. In the preliminary two years of the gold rush contracted labor was the most common hiring method, but evidence shows contracts were not easily enforced as excerpts from sea captains show accounts of Chinese miners leaving their contractors once they arrived in America.

Chinese miners were not present in California in a substantial manner at the beginning of the Gold Rush. The population of Chinese miners in California did not break 1,000 people until 1851 with 2,700 miners being counted in the census. In the years preceding 1852, Chinese miner populations developed rapidly, moving to 20,000 miners in 1852. Unlike the first Chinese prospectors, the immigrants in 1852 came on their own account using methods like credit tickets to fund their trip. While pull factors to America were present and prevalent, a majority of Chinese miners hailed from Southern China, mostly Guangdong, and were escaping racial hostility. Another influential push factor from China was shipping companies encouraging immigration to draw profits from people interested in mining in America.

== Work patterns ==
As Chinese people initially showed up to California they and most other individually contracted workers practiced alluvial mining along stream beds. This method of mining was extremely cheap and accessible to all miners. The only material people needed for alluvial mining was a rocker box which was a cheaply made piece of equipment that sifted gold out from stream beds. Majority of miners relied on Gold and water as a source to make money. Some miners would take claims along streams individually but jointly registering claims proved to be an effective method of efficiently profiting, and Chinese miners actively participated in this. From 1854-1857 44% of 61 claims made by Chinese miners accounted for parties of two or three miners. This method of joint claims proved to work as well for Chinese miners as white miners, making around 75$ per month per person on claims that were valued at $500-$600. Individual mining quickly became more organized and sophisticated, and as mining developed so did companies pertaining to mining. Many companies emerged from groups that took claims together consistently and Chinese miners were not excluded from this.

Chinese mining companies such as John China Placer Mining Company and the Hong Kong China Wing Dam Company emerged in the 1850s. They are described to have hired anywhere from 12 to 20 workers and provided industrial equipment taking larger-scale claims as well. Most Chinese companies unlike American mining companies operated on the basis of a share in order to spread risk between miners rather than a wage system which was orthodox at the time. Smaller-scale workers’ cooperatives among Chinese miners also emerged in the 1850s which operated similarly to larger-scale companies in that they used shares to spread risk among workers, but unlike merchant-investor corporations, these cooperatives used equal shares for profits and expenses. Cooperatives and companies took the forefront of miners as by the 1880s claims were largely taken by groups of around a dozen miners using industrial equipment rather than rockers.

Chinese miners also worked for wages from white employers and business owners. In the early 1850s miners white and Chinese miners worked side-by-side as labor became more sophisticated and specialized wages became more egalitarian. By the 1850s Chinese miners were earning between $39 and $50 per month which was around the average monthly wage for white miners. Chinese laborers also had a significant presence in unskilled labor as well in quartz mining mills, feeding the machines that crushed rocks and revealed gold from the California granite. Chinese miners were more commonly hired by water companies in order to transport water to hydraulic presses.

== Nativism ==
Nativism from white miners towards Chinese miners was present as soon as Chinese immigrants stepped foot in California. Mining was a highly individualized and competitive industry in the first few years of the Gold Rush and resentment towards Chinese miners was violent immediately.This resentment was caused by white miners fearing that the Chinese would mine all of the gold left in California and that they would lose revenue due to the Chinese. While proponents of exclusion outnumbered those that opposed it, exclusionary policy was not passed until the late 1850s because Chinese miners paid a tax for mining.There was also a Foreign Miners Tax Which taxed foreign miners a yearly tax and generated revenue for whites. Chinese miners contributed to state and local tax revenues considerably and also took very little resources from the state. Favorability towards exclusion shifted from being attributed to competition to being financially feasible in 1858 as California gained its economic footing.
