= TV Junkie =

2006 film by Michael Cain, Matt Radecki

TV Junkie is a 2006 documentary that chronicles Rick Kirkham's drug addiction.

== Production ==
Its filmmakers, Michael Cain and Matt Radecki, sifted through the video diary footage to piece together the story of Kirkham's life, focusing on the seven years in which he and his family struggled with his addiction to crack cocaine. It was shown at Sundance in 2006. The film was the subject of a lawsuit by his ex-wife Tammie.

== Reception ==
Variety gave the film a middling review, finding the central figure unpleasant and unsympathetic and the production values inevitably low. Film Threat found it "an unbelievably candid glimpse into the contradictions of cocaine addiction", and praised Kirkham's articulate and authentic self-portrait. OutNow.CH found it had a certain fascination beyond what would be expected.

== Accolades ==
It won a Special Jury Prize in Documentary at that year's Sundance Film Festival.
