= No One (2005 film) =

2005 film

- Spanish: De Nadie
- Directed by: Tin Dirdamal
- Written by: Lizzette Argüello; Iliana Martinez
- Produced by: Tin Dirdamal, José Torres Cuéllar
- Starring: Maria Ponce; Antonio Ponce; José Medina; L. Hernández; Ricardo Del Valle; Fabiene Vennete; José María Salvador; Santos Funes
- Cinematography: Sofía Ortega; Luís Ortuño; Jorge Rodriguez
- Edited by: José Torres Cuéllar
- Music by: Alfonso M. Ruibal
- Production company: Producciones Tranvía
- Release date: July 11, 2005
- Running time: 82 minutes
- Country: Mexico
- Language: Spanish

No One (Spanish: De Nadie) is a Mexican documentary film by Tin Dirdamal on the impoverished Central Americans who leave their countries in hope of a better life in the United States. It premiered in 2005 and was shown at different international film festivals, winning the Sundance Film Festival audience award for World Documentary in 2006.

The film follows a number of refugees who have to cross Mexico, about 4,000 kilometers, before reaching the US border. On their way through Mexico they put their remaining money, dignity, health and life on the line.

The soundtrack was written by Mexican composer Alfonso M.
