= Yang Yong-hi =

Zainichi Korean filmmaker (born 1964)

- Born: 11 November 1964 (age 61); Osaka, Japan
- Education: Korea University in Tokyo; The New School University - Master's degree in Media Studies
- Occupation: Film director

Korean name
- Hangul: 양영희
- Hanja: 梁英姬
- RR: Yang Yeonghui
- MR: Yang Yŏnghŭi

Yang Yong-hi (ヤン・ヨンヒ) is a Japanese-born Korean (or Zainichi) film director. Yang has directed multiple films, particularly focusing on her cultural and familial experiences in modern North Korea.

== Life and career ==
Yang Yong-hi is a second-generation Korean resident who was born in Osaka, Japan on 11 November 1964. She belongs to the ethnic Korean minority community in Japan, many of whom are descendants of Koreans brought there during Japan's 1910-1945 colonial rule of Korea. Yang studied at the Korea University in Tokyo and New School University, where she gained a master's in media studies. She is fluent in three languages.

Her famed documentary Dear Pyongyang picked up the Jury Special award in the World Cinema section for documentaries at the 2006 Sundance Film Festival, and the NETPAC Award at the 56th Berlin International Film Festival. She based it on her dual identity and her difficult relationship with her father. Yang's father was an influential member of the GAKR (General Association of Korean Residents in Japan, or "Chongryon" which is also sometimes referred to as "Soren") — a controversial organization in Tokyo that ostensibly helps North Koreans in Japan with travel or legal problems, but may also act as a pipeline between North Korea and family members in South Korea. She and her father had passionate political arguments over the years. Chongryon, the organization Yang's father was an influential member of, actually demanded a written apology from Yang for offending North Korea through her documentary Dear Pyongyang which Yang refused to give.

Growing up as the daughter of a North Korean patriot was fraught with difficulties, but Yang points out that she "was lucky. As the youngest child and the only girl, I was spared the fate of my three older brothers, which was to be shipped back to Pyongyang in their late teens." Her father's decision was motivated by the well-intentioned desire to spare his sons the social discrimination suffered by North Korean boys in Japan, but sending her brothers back to the fatherland tore the family apart. Lured by propaganda that portrayed North Korea as "a paradise," her three brothers are among the estimated 90,000 people who were repatriated to North Korea under a project initiated by the pro-Pyongyang association of Korean residents in Japan from the late 1950s to the early 1980s.

Yang first visited North Korea as part of a high school field trip, and she returned there several times and got to know her niece, named Sona. Her second documentary Sona, the Other Myself is a tribute to the time Yang spent with her family in North Korea, showing unused footage collected during her earlier visits to North Korea. In it Yang lingers over Sona's guileless infant-hood followed by her forced induction into the rigidly disciplinarian North Korean educational system. It highlights the innocence of her niece in the brief period before school changed her, initiating her into loyalty to the North Korean government whereby she could recite party line rhetoric and songs to celebrate the glory of "our father."

Yang alternated between Tokyo and Pyongyang with her camera, first to shoot Dear Pyongyang and then to concentrate on Sona, before she was officially banned from entering North Korea in 2006. That was the last time she saw her niece.

Her first feature film, Our Homeland is based on her experience of a tearful reunion with her brother Seong-ho, who returned to Japan 25 years after leaving for North Korea, during a three-month visit to get medical treatment for a brain tumor. The film won the C.I.C.A.E. Panorama film award at the 2012 Berlin International Film Festival. It also won Sakura Ando the Best Actress Award and Arata Iura the Best Supporting Actors Award at the 2012 Blue Ribbon Awards where the film itself won Best Screenplay and Best Feature Film.

In 2012, Yang said she was still afraid for her brothers' safety after the release of her films over the previous 15 years, but would continue to make films about her family. In 2021, after a years-long hiatus, she made the documentary film Soup and Ideology, which focuses on the life story of her elderly mother and reveals the family's traumatic connection to the Jeju Uprising.

== Filmography ==
- Dear Pyongyang (2005)
- Sona, the Other Myself (2010)
- Our Homeland (2012)
- Soup and Ideology (2021)
