= Asian Americans in music =

Music by Asian Americans

Asian Americans have a documented history of making music in America beginning in the middle of the 19th and early 20th century, alongside other arts and entertainment. As with Asian American literature, much of Asian American history including in music, is in the process of being recovered. Despite the rise in the popularity of artists from Asia (perhaps especially but not limited to K-pop) and the recent widespread success of United Kingdom artists such as Rina Sawayama and M.I.A. and Australian artists such as Dami Im, Asian Americans continue to face difficulties overcoming systemic racism to gain popularity in America. Although progress has been slow, modern artists are continuing to break new ground within the music industry.

== Exclusion Era ==
During the era of the Chinese Exclusion Act, people of Chinese heritage were barred from holding American citizenship status. For example, despite being a third-generation American born in the United States, actress Anna May Wong held a special "Certificate of Identity" issued by the US government and signed by an immigration officer describing her as a "Chinese person". This time period saw much ghettoization and segregation. Immigrants from China during this time period came from the coastal regions (especially Taishan) of the Guangdong province, bringing with them a love of a form of narrative song tradition from Taishan called muyu (also known as muk'yu) and several styles of Chinese opera. Muyu covered a wide range of topics, such as histories and myths, and in America, also included songs about the experiences of Chinese Americans of this time period. Bruce Lee's father, Lee Hoi-Chuen, was a member of a touring group, the Cantonese Opera Company, who first came to America to perform opera music. San Francisco boasted of no less than four venues for Cantonese opera between the late 1870s and 1880s. Famous composers outside the community such as Charles Wakefield Cadman and Samuel Barlow based several compositions on themes present in this music.

== Japanese American Internment ==
While incarcerated during the Japanese American Internment at the Heart Mountain Relocation Center Joy Takeshita Teraoka was among several Japanese Americans who joined the jazz band the George Igawa Orchestra that performed across Wyoming. This was part of several musical projects formed at the camps and was the subject of a documentary "For Joy" by Julian Saporiti of the No-No Boy Project.

== Asian American Movement ==
The Asian American movement was born out of the civil rights movement during the 1960s and 1970s. From this movement the album A Grain of Sand: Music for the Struggle by Asians in America, first recorded in 1973 and released by Paredon Records, was created and is the first widely recognized Asian American album. The brainchild of Chris Kando Iijima, Nobuko JoAnne Miyamoto, and William “Charlie” Chin, chosen topics on the album ranged from those within the Asian American community to those in support of other civil rights organizations and causes.

== Current issues ==
Alongside many other non-Asian countries with nationals of Asian heritage, the United States music industry's institutional racism and racial harassment from spectators continue to include members of the Asian American community. This barrier spans genres from classical, to country, to heavy metal. Only recently has there been more widespread recognition in hip hop. As noted by musicians in the classical circuit, sometimes apparent representation can conceal persistent stereotypes such as within the classical genre around the artist's ability to give a "non-mechanical" performance or to be "Western" enough. A part of the picture also includes an element of appearances. Artists who appear less Asian and yet have Asian heritage will often be accepted more readily than those who appear more Asian. As stated by the artist Z.Woods in an interview with Bustle, "The reason why artists like Bruno Mars, Yuna, and Nicole [Schezinger] become so successful is due to the fact that [people] can't tell that they are Asian...They have the luxury of looking ambiguous".

While an outgrowth of anti-Asian racism as a whole (and inclusive of problems stemming from Asian stereotypes and exotification), the rise in popularity of K-pop and other music from Asia has not directly translated into greater success for Asian American artists. Knowing how to market artists has been one of many challenges that the industry faces. It is also not unheard of for the intersectionality of racialized classification and nationality to help or harm a particular group. For example, in France, African Americans will oftentimes experience less racism compared to African immigrants to France. Asian Americans have also had a difficult time breaking into the local market without first gaining fame in Asia. This trend has led some artists, such as Far East Movement to give the advice, "Go out to Asia. You are welcomed there. Get that following, and bring those global numbers back here.". An early example of this trend was the band Solid, and Tiger JK has been noted as one of the more pinnacle examples. This isn't entirely unprecedented in the American music industry as a whole. Stars like Tina Turner had more support in Europe than at home in the United States, despite the African American roots of genres like rock 'n roll, the mainstream industry had racialized it as 'white' music, making her "too white for Black [radio] jockeys and too Black for white jockeys" in the United States.

Additional issues in music criticism such as the tug-of-war politics of the recognition of the value of Asian heritage and traditions in the American landscape, as well as the perceived capability of Asians to enjoy and perform "Western" styles leading to external views of being not Asian enough or too "Western" have added an additional layer of difficulty for artists trying to break into the industry.

This combined with the aforementioned finding of fame abroad for some Asian Americans has led some scholars to prefer the wider definition of 'Asian Americans making music' when studying the contributions of Asian American music artists to avoid a myopic view and removing the breadth of Asian American musical production.

== See also ==
- Asian Americans in arts and entertainment
- History of Asian Americans
- Portrayal of East Asians in American film and theater
- Asian Americans
- Category:American musicians of Asian descent
