= Our Homeland =

2012 Japanese film by Yang Yong-hi

- DVD cover
- Directed by: Yang Yong-hi
- Written by: Yang Yong-hi
- Produced by: Koshikawa Michio; Sato Junko; Kawamura Mitsunobu
- Starring: Sakura Ando; Arata Iura
- Cinematography: Toda Yoshihisa
- Edited by: Kikui Takashige
- Music by: Taro Iwashiro
- Distributed by: Star Sands; Slow Learner
- Release dates: 11 February 2012 (Berlin); 4 August 2012 (Japan)
- Running time: 99 minutes
- Country: Japan
- Language: Japanese

Our Homeland (Japanese: かぞくのくに, Hepburn: Kazoku no kuni) is a 2012 Japanese drama film about a Korean man's visit to his family in Japan after a long exile in North Korea. This is the feature directorial debut of Yang Yong-hi, a second-generation ethnic Korean living in Japan who based the film on her family history. The film was selected as the Japanese entry for the Best Foreign Language Oscar at the 85th Academy Awards, but it did not make the final shortlist.

== Plot ==
From the late 1950s and into the 1970s, more than 90,000 of the Korean residents in Japan emigrated to North Korea, a country that promised them affluence, justice and an end to discrimination. Our Homeland tells the story of one of their number, who returns for just a short period. Yoon Seong-ho was sent to North Korea as a teen by his fervently North-supporting father. Returning to Tokyo for medical treatment after 25 years, he finds it difficult to open up to his family, including his passionately anti-North sister Rie. Seong-ho and Rie are two people handed radically different life perspectives by the course of history. While Seong-ho's path is sketched out for him, Rie recognizes that a whole world of opportunities is open to her, including the chance to rebel against her own family.

== Cast ==
- Arata Iura as Yoon Seong-ho
- Sakura Ando as Rie
- Yang Ik-june as Yang, Seong-ho's minder
- Kotomi Kyôno as Suni
- Masane Tsukayama as Seong-ho's father
- Miyazaki Yoshiko as Seong-ho's mother
- Suwa Taro as Tejo, Seong-ho's uncle
- Suzuki Shinsuke
- Tatsushi Ōmori as Hongi
- Jun Murakami as Juno
- Shogo as Chori
- Yamada Maho

== See also ==
- Cinema of Japan
- List of submissions to the 85th Academy Awards for Best Foreign Language Film
- List of Japanese submissions for the Academy Award for Best Foreign Language Film
