= Clear Cut: The Story of Philomath, Oregon =

- Movie poster
- Directed by: Peter Richardson
- Produced by: Peter Richardson
- Starring: Steve Lowther
- Music by: Debra Arlyn
- Distributed by: Bicoastal Films
- Release date: January 20, 2006
- Running time: 72 minutes
- Country: United States
- Language: English

Clear Cut: The Story of Philomath, Oregon is a 2006 American documentary film produced and directed by Peter Richardson. It was filmed in the city of Philomath, Oregon. The film made its premiere at the Sundance Film Festival in January 2006.

== Synopsis ==
This documentary depicts a vivid example of America's current culture war. It shows a rural community, Philomath, Oregon, that is making a large transition from once being a dominant force through an "old time" profession, the timber industry, to one that is dominated by professionals and techies, the "Information Age". This is shown by the drastic decline of lumber mills in the area. In 1980, there were twelve mills around Philomath, but twenty-five years later there were only two. The largest employers are no longer the lumber mills but Oregon State University in Corvallis, which is about six miles from Philomath, and a Hewlett-Packard center involved in engineering ink-jet components.

The roots of the community go back to a man named Rex Clemens, who lived from 1901 to 1985. He was a high school dropout who became wealthy through the lumber business. Due to his wealth, Clemens set up a foundation in 1958 that helped support school functions, construction, and progress while also providing a four-year scholarship to anyone who graduated from Philomath High School.

After several decades, other people started immigrating to the area, and a new school superintendent, Terry Kneisler, was hired from Chicago. He moved to modify many traditions, and as a result, aspects of the timber industry were questioned, a Gay-Straight Alliance group for students was formed, and the school's mascot, the "Warriors", was challenged.

Many people who had lived there for years, some for their entire lives, began to object to these changes. Three of these people happened to be Rex Clemens' nephews, who were now in charge of the foundation their uncle set up. Steve Lowther, one of the nephews, led the traditionalists in their battle against Kneisler. After the two sides had multiple disagreements and conflicts, Lowther told the school board that Kneisler or the foundation must go. Later, Kneisler did leave.

Lowther amended the foundation so that preference would be given to students who come from timber, agricultural, or mining families. Preference will also be given to students who will go on to pursue a career related to one of these fields of work.

== Later developments ==
In 2008, the Lowthers once again amended the scholarship plan — the program would limit its grants to students who are at least second-generation residents of Philomath, Alsea, Eddyville, or the Eastern Oregon town of Crane, and the awards can be used at public or private colleges, trade, vocational or medical schools.

== Release ==
The film became available for streaming on Hulu and Netflix on March 1, 2012.

== Reception ==
On review aggregator website Rotten Tomatoes, the film holds an approval rating of 100% based on 5 reviews, with an average rating of 7.0/10.
