= Philomath, Oregon =

- City
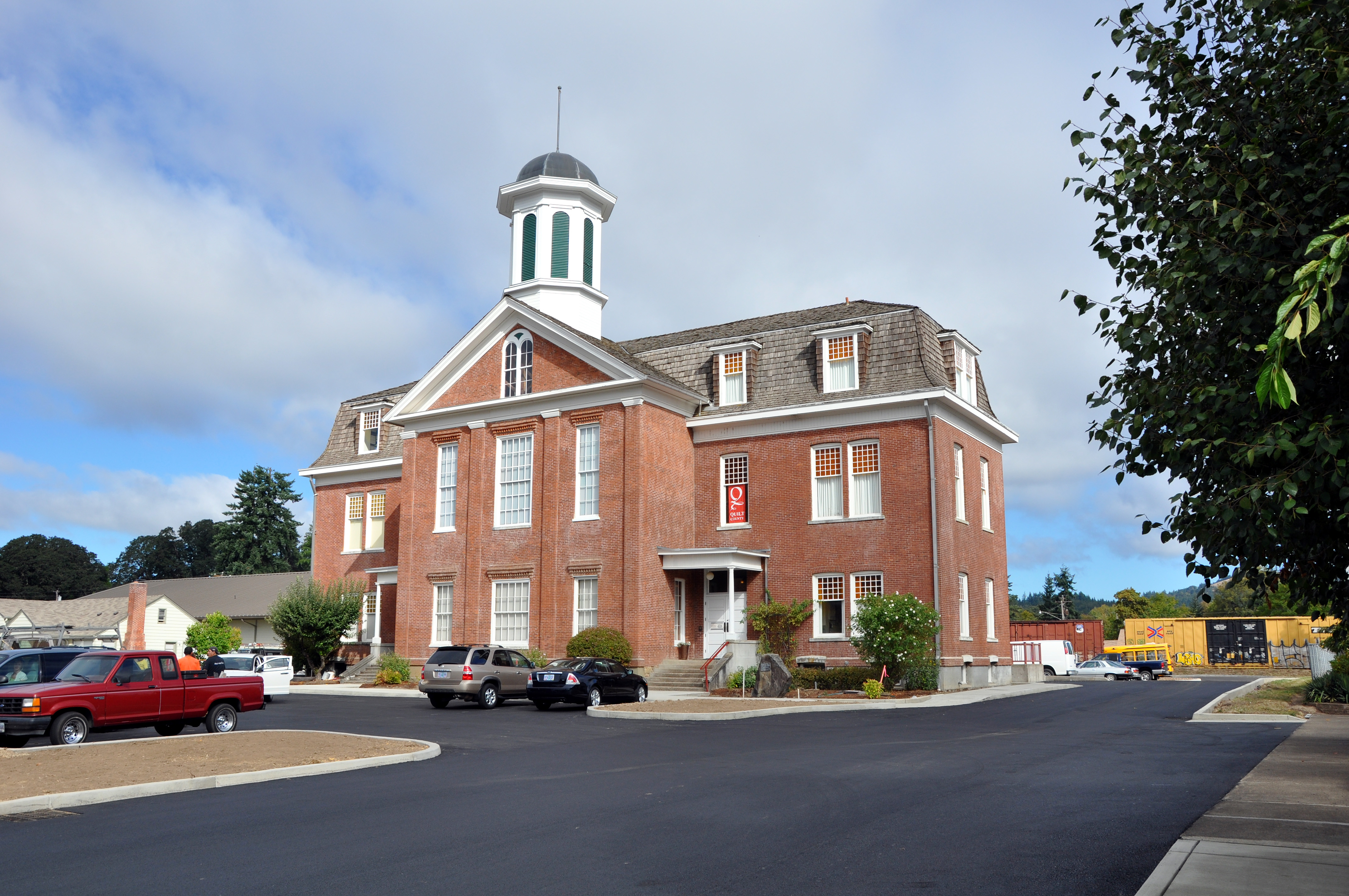
- Benton County Historical Museum in Philomath
- Nickname: City of Volunteers
- Location in Oregon
- Coordinates: 44°32′56″N 123°21′56″W
- Country: United States
- State: Oregon
- County: Benton
- Incorporated: 1882

Government
  - Body: Philomath City Council
  - Mayor: Christopher McMorran

Area
  - Total: 2.22 sq mi (5.76 km^{2})
  - Land: 2.07 sq mi (5.35 km^{2})
  - Water: 0.16 sq mi (0.42 km^{2})
- Elevation: 282 ft (86 m)

Population (2020)
  - Total: 5,350
  - Density: 2,592.2/sq mi (1,000.85/km^{2})
- Time zone: UTC-8 (Pacific)
  - Summer (DST): UTC-7 (Pacific)
- ZIP code: 97370
- Area code: 541
- FIPS code: 41-57450
- GNIS feature ID: 2411413
- Website: www.philomathoregon.gov

Philomath (/fɪˈloʊmɪθ/ fi-LOH-mith) is a city in Benton County, Oregon, United States. It was named for Philomath (Greek, "love of learning") College. The population was 5,838 as of the 2023 census population estimates. It is part of the Corvallis Metropolitan Statistical Area.

== History ==
Philomath was named after the Philomath College which was founded in 1867 by the United Brethren Church. The college opened its doors in October of that year, with enrollment the first day at about 100. The first teachers were Joseph Hannon, who acted as principal, and Elisha Woodward, teacher in the primary department. The name of the college and city was derived from two Greek words meaning "lover of learning". The city was incorporated on October 20, 1882. The college closed in 1929 due to a dramatic decline in enrollment.

== Geography ==
Philomath is 2 miles (3 km) west of Corvallis on U.S. Route 20.

According to the United States Census Bureau, the city has a total area of 2.05 square miles (5.31 km^{2}), of which 1.86 square miles (4.82 km^{2}) is land and 0.19 square miles (0.49 km^{2}) is water.

=== Climate ===
This region experiences warm (but not hot) and dry summers, with no average monthly temperatures above 71.6 °F (22.0 °C). According to the Köppen Climate Classification system, Philomath has a warm-summer Mediterranean climate, abbreviated Csb on climate maps.

== Demographics ==
Historical population
Census	Pop.	Note	%±
1880	224		—
1900	343		—
1910	505		47.2%
1920	591		17.0%
1930	694		17.4%
1940	856		23.3%
1950	1,289		50.6%
1960	1,359		5.4%
1970	1,688		24.2%
1980	2,673		58.4%
1990	2,983		11.6%
2000	4,056		36.0%
2010	4,584		13.0%
2020	5,350		16.7%
U.S. Decennial Census

=== Racial and ethnic composition ===
Racial composition as of the 2020 census
Race	Number	Percent
White	4,478	83.7%
Black or African American	41	0.8%
American Indian and Alaska Native	67	1.3%
Asian	90	1.7%
Native Hawaiian and Other Pacific Islander	8	0.1%
Some other race	170	3.2%
Two or more races	496	9.3%
Hispanic or Latino (of any race)	487	9.1%

=== 2020 census ===
As of the 2020 census, Philomath had a population of 5,350. The median age was 34.9 years. 22.5% of residents were under the age of 18 and 13.2% of residents were 65 years of age or older. For every 100 females there were 94.1 males, and for every 100 females age 18 and over there were 92.2 males age 18 and over.

99.7% of residents lived in urban areas, while 0.3% lived in rural areas.

There were 2,102 households in Philomath, of which 31.4% had children under the age of 18 living in them. Of all households, 46.3% were married-couple households, 16.3% were households with a male householder and no spouse or partner present, and 26.9% were households with a female householder and no spouse or partner present. About 24.5% of all households were made up of individuals and 9.0% had someone living alone who was 65 years of age or older.

There were 2,270 housing units, of which 7.4% were vacant. Among occupied housing units, 56.2% were owner-occupied and 43.8% were renter-occupied. The homeowner vacancy rate was 0.7% and the rental vacancy rate was 5.4%.

=== 2010 census ===
As of the census of 2010, there were 4,584 people, 1,733 households, and 1,203 families living in the city. The population density was 2,464.5 inhabitants per square mile (951.5/km^{2}). There were 1,837 housing units at an average density of 987.6 per square mile (381.3/km^{2}). The racial makeup of the city was 91.1% White, 0.7% African American, 1.2% Native American, 1.0% Asian, 2.4% from other races, and 3.7% from two or more races. Hispanic or Latino of any race were 6.7% of the population.

There were 1,733 households, of which 38.2% had children under the age of 18 living with them, 51.7% were married couples living together, 14.0% had a female householder with no husband present, 3.8% had a male householder with no wife present, and 30.6% were non-families. 23.4% of all households were made up of individuals, and 5.9% had someone living alone who was 65 years of age or older. The average household size was 2.64 and the average family size was 3.11.

The median age in the city was 34.3 years. 27.9% of residents were under the age of 18; 9.2% were between the ages of 18 and 24; 27.2% were from 25 to 44; 26.3% were from 45 to 64; and 9.4% were 65 years of age or older. The gender makeup of the city was 47.8% male and 52.2% female.

=== 2000 census ===
As of the census of 2000, there were 3,838 people, 1,346 households, and 1,017 families living in the city. The population density was 2,993.0 inhabitants per square mile (1,155.6/km^{2}). There were 1,434 housing units at an average density of 1,118.3 per square mile (431.8/km^{2}). The racial makeup of the city was 93.25% White, 0.16% African American, 1.64% Native American, 1.20% Asian, 0.23% Pacific Islander, 1.25% from other races, and 2.27% from two or more races. Hispanic or Latino of any race were 3.93% of the population.

There were 1,346 households, out of which 47.3% had children under the age of 18 living with them, 55.8% were married couples living together, 15.1% had a female householder with no husband present, and 24.4% were non-families. 18.6% of all households were made up of individuals, and 5.1% had someone living alone who was 65 years of age or older. The average household size was 2.85 and the average family size was 3.22.

In the city, the population was spread out, with 34.3% under the age of 18, 7.1% from 18 to 24, 32.1% from 25 to 44, 19.6% from 45 to 64, and 6.9% who were 65 years of age or older. The median age was 32 years. For every 100 females, there were 98.9 males. For every 100 females age 18 and over, there were 95.2 males.

The median income for a household in the city was $41,461, and the median income for a family was $42,578. Males had a median income of $36,104 versus $25,281 for females. The per capita income for the city was $16,620. About 6.5% of families and 8.2% of the population were below the poverty line, including 9.2% of those under age 18 and 10.2% of those aged 65 or over.

== Economy ==
Philomath is home to several sawmills including Interfor and Paw Lumber Co. Gene Tools, LLC manufactures Morpholino antisense oligonucleotides. Wet Labs produces oceanographic measuring equipment. Pioneer Connect provides telephone, internet and video services, including fiber and broadband internet. Alyrica Networks provides WiFi access in the town, as well as fixed wireless high-speed Internet service. Solar Summit manufactures solar panels and alternative energy products. Gathering Together Farm is one of the first certified organic vegetable farms in the United States, and is an international agrotourism destination.

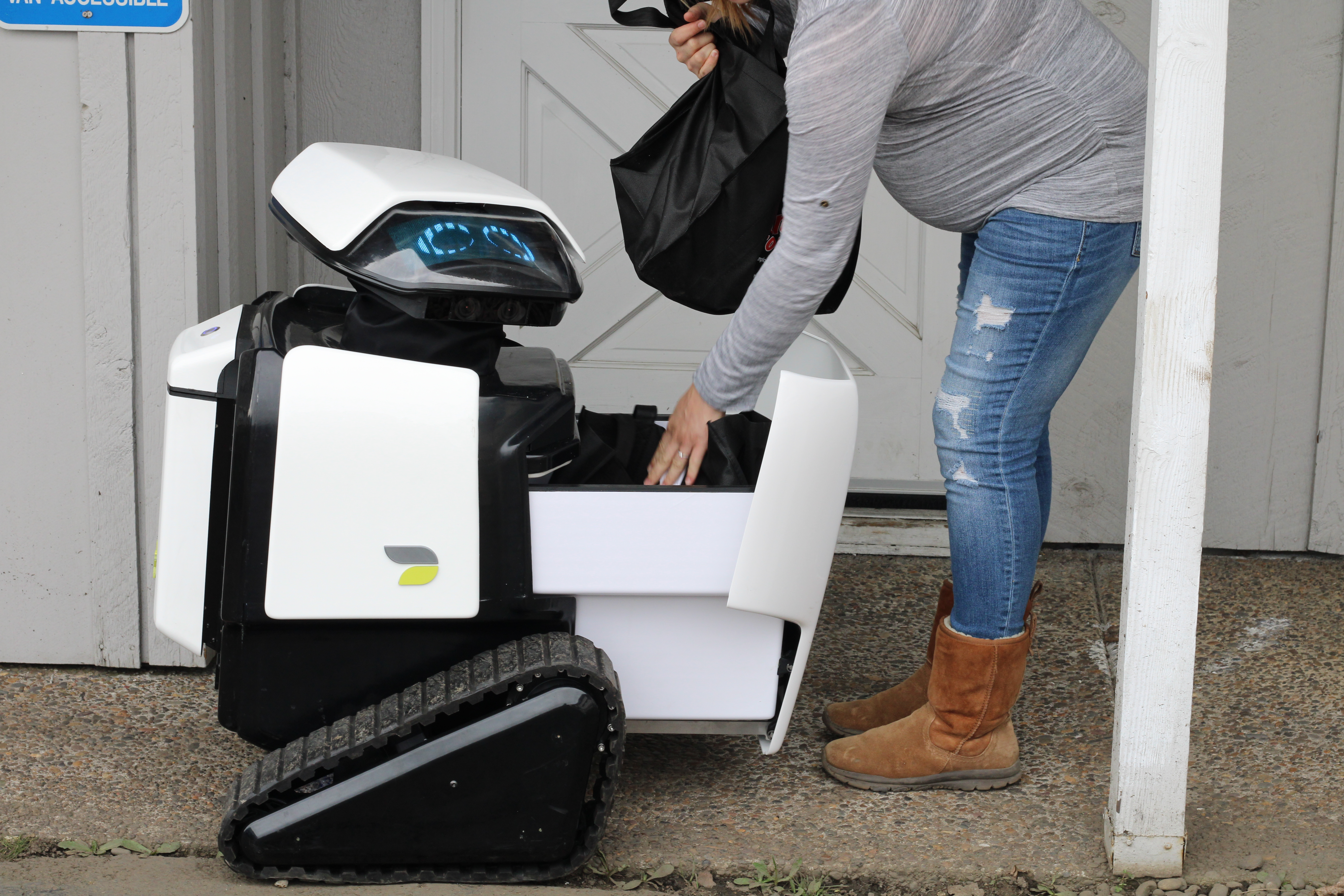
Daxbot executing a delivery in Philomath

In 2020, Philomath residents were among the first in the world to receive their food deliveries from a robot: Daxbot, which is built by a Philomath-based business. Daxbot is a 36-in, semi-autonomous delivery robot that can keep food hot or cold, and makes free deliveries for businesses and individuals in Philomath. The Philomath City Council gave Nova Dynamics permission to allow Dax to make deliveries and travel in town. Dax is considered a pedestrian, not a vehicle, and shares roads and sidewalks with other pedestrians, cyclists, and motorists.

== Education ==
Philomath is served by the Philomath School District, which includes the following schools:

- Philomath Elementary School
- Clemens Primary School
- Blodgett Elementary School
- Philomath Middle School
- Philomath Academy
- Philomath High School
- Kings Valley Charter School (Pre-K through 12th grade)

== Parks and recreation ==
The city of Philomath owns and maintains at least 8 public parks within and adjacent to the city limits. The largest park in Philomath is Marys River Park, which occupies approximately 28 acres along the Marys River and includes three bridges, a covered picnic shelter, and restrooms.

Parks in Philomath, OR
Name	Size (Acres)	Location	Features
Marys River Park	28	300 S 11th St	Picnic shelter, 9 hole disc golf course, horseshoe pits, walking paths, playground area, off-leash dog area.
Philomath City Park	10.5	299 S 23rd St	Baseball field, beginners skate park, 2 large playground areas, horseshoe pits, fitness area.
Flossie Overman Discovery Park	.42	524 N 11th St	Basketball court, swings, slide, sand jump, climbing features, with a natural playscape.
Westbrook Park	.78	250 Jade Place	Small basketball court, playground equipment, covered picnic area, gravel walking path.
Newton Creek Park & Path	3.46	2686 Applegate St	Neighborhood park stretching from Applegate St. to Main Street featuring a paved bike path, two playground areas, and picnic tables.
Triangle Park	N/A	700 College Street	Small basketball court, small covered shelter, playground area and benches.
Reservoir Park	2.03	3100 Applegate Street	Nature park including a park bench and picnic tables with views of Philomath and Marys Peak.
Pioneer Park	N/A	1202 Pioneer Street	Small neighborhood pocket park with a park bench and grass.
Dale Collins Park	N/A	1501 Applegate Street	Features an electronic board that displays local events, a mosaic public art structure, a bench, and picnic tables.

== Media ==
The Philomath News is a digital newspaper owned by Brad Fuqua.

== Documentary ==
The film Clear Cut: The Story of Philomath, Oregon documents the clash of cultures in Philomath between the old-time timber industry and the professionals and techies of the Information Age. The film was shown at the Sundance Film Festival in 2006.
