= Dear Pyongyang =

2005 Japanese documentary

- South Korean theatrical poster
- Hangul: 디어 평양
- RR: Dieo Pyeongyang
- MR: Tiŏ P'yŏngyang
- Directed by: Yang Young-hee (South Korea); Yang Yong-hi (Japan)
- Produced by: Inaba Toshiya
- Edited by: Nakaushi Akane
- Distributed by: Cheon, Inc.
- Release dates: October 2005 (PiFan); August 26, 2006 (Japan)
- Running time: 107 minutes
- Country: Japan
- Languages: Japanese; Korean

Dear Pyongyang (Korean: 디어 평양) is a documentary film by Zainichi Korean director Yang Yong-hi about her family. It was shot in both Yang's hometown of Osaka, Japan, and Pyongyang, North Korea. The film has both Korean and Japanese dialogue with subtitles. The US release has Korean and Japanese dialogue with English subtitles. In August 2006, Yang released a book in Japanese under the same title expanding on the themes she explored in the film.

== Story ==
In the 1970s, Yang's father, an ardent communist and leader of the pro-North movement in Japan, sent his three sons from Japan to North Korea under a repatriation campaign sponsored by ethnic activist organisation and de facto North Korean embassy Chongryon. As the only daughter, Yang remained in Japan. However, as the economic situation in the North deteriorated, the brothers became increasingly dependent for survival on the care packages sent by their parents. The film shows Yang's visits to her brothers in Pyongyang, as well as conversations with her father about his ideological views and his regrets over breaking up his family.

== Film festivals ==
- Sundance Film Festival, 2006
- Pusan International Film Festival, 2006
- Berlin International Film Festival, 2006
- Hong Kong Asian Film Festival, 2021
