= List of Tiger King subjects =

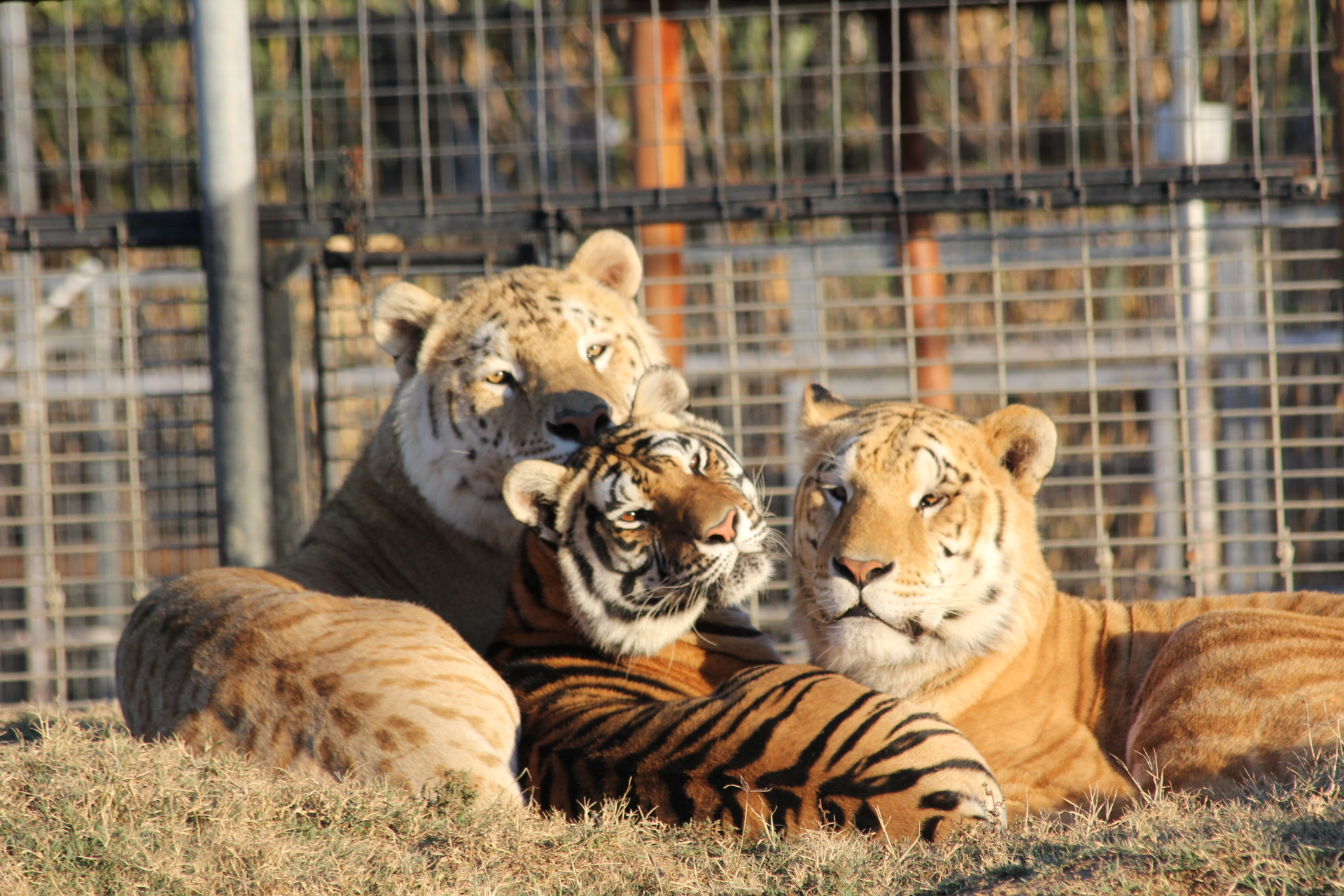
A group of big cats at the Greater Wynnewood Exotic Animal Park

The American true crime documentary streaming television miniseries Tiger King: Murder, Mayhem, and Madness (titled onscreen as simply Tiger King) features a large cast of characters, with the majority of them being big cat enthusiasts. Netflix and viewers described the cast as eccentric.

== Introduced in Season 1 ==
=== Joe Exotic ===
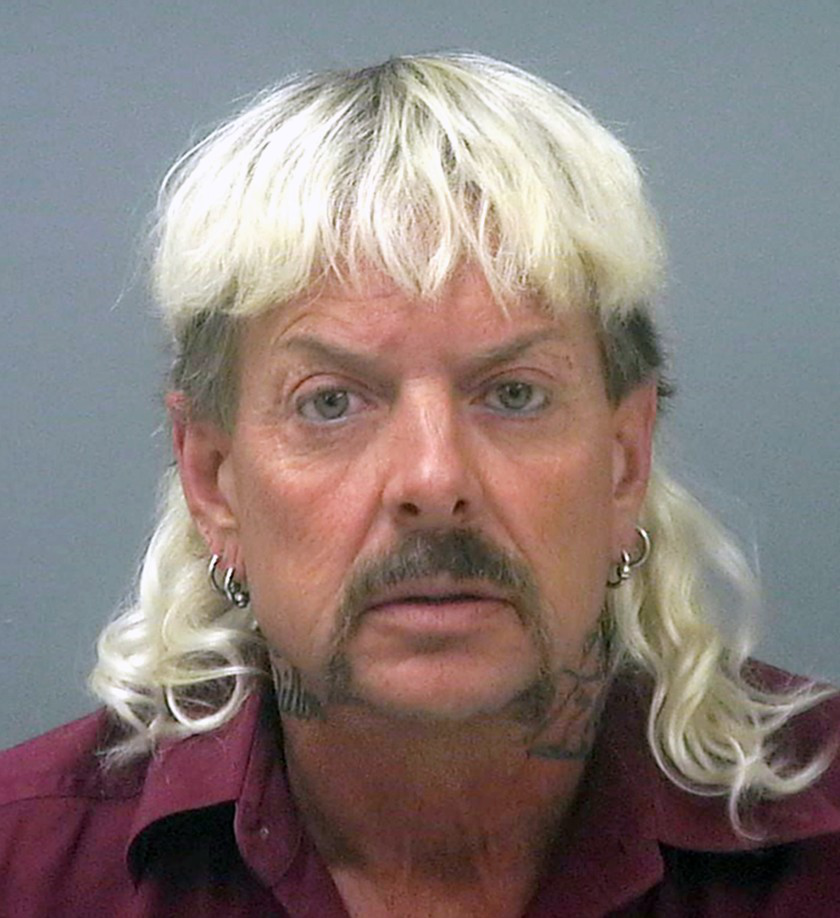
Joe Exotic, the main subject featured in Tiger King

Joseph Allen Maldonado-Passage, (né Schreibvogel; born March 5, 1963), popularly known as Joe Exotic, is an American former zookeeper, convicted felon and the former owner and operator of Greater Wynnewood Exotic Animal Park in Oklahoma. He claimed to be the most prolific breeder of tigers in the United States. He ran as a candidate for president of the United States as well as for governor of Oklahoma, but neither campaign managed to garner significant public support. Aside from his career as a zookeeper and his political runs, Exotic had several side-projects, including his country music, magic shows, a career in the police force, and a professional wrestling commentator.

For over 20 years, Exotic was the owner and operator of the Greater Wynnewood Exotic Animal Park, known for its big cats. He operated an online reality television show that he streamed from his zoo. Over the years, he operated sideshows around the country, allowing people to pet tiger cubs. He also staged shows at fairs and in shopping malls. In 2019 he was convicted on 17 federal charges of animal abuse (eight violations of the Lacey Act and nine of the Endangered Species Act) and two counts of murder-for-hire, for a plot to kill Carole Baskin, the chief executive officer of Big Cat Rescue, an animal rescue organization for exotic cats. Exotic was sentenced to 22 years in federal prison, though his sentence was later reduced to 17 years in July 2021.

Exotic is the main focus of Tiger King, with the documentary discussing his zookeeping career, political runs and feud with Baskin. As a result of the documentary, Exotic received significant amounts of attention on social media, inspiring several internet memes and gaining a fanbase. In prison, Exotic has been writing an autobiography.

=== Carole Baskin ===
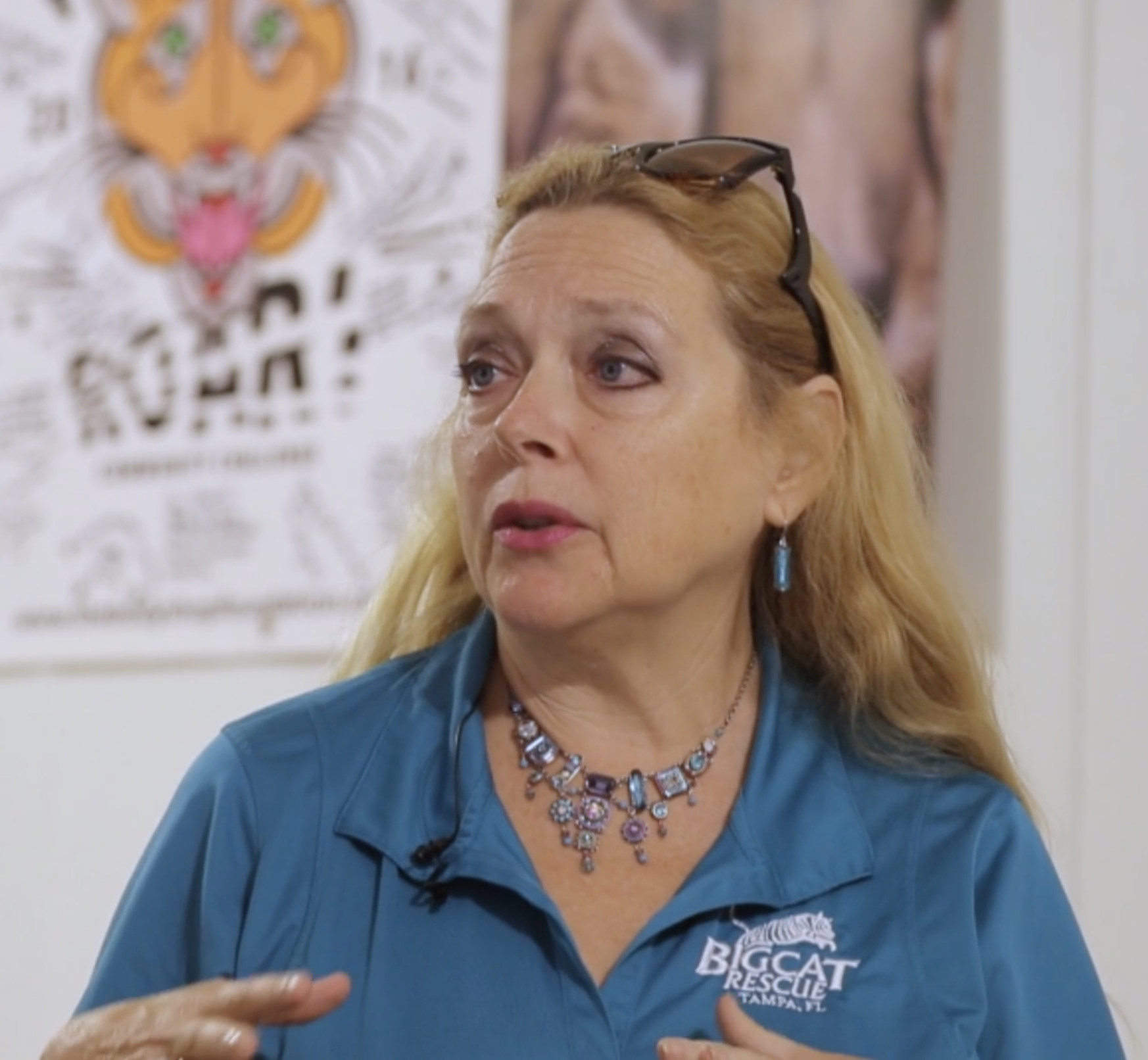
Carole Baskin, the second most well-known subject in Tiger King

Carole Baskin (née Stairs; born June 6, 1961) is an American animal rights activist and owner of Big Cat Rescue, a non-profit animal sanctuary based near Tampa, Florida. Baskin drew public attention for her role in Tiger King. The Netflix series follows both Baskin and Joe Exotic, filming their ongoing and escalating feuds over exotic animals in private zoos.

She and Don Lewis founded Wildlife on Easy Street, an animal sanctuary near Tampa for big cats, in 1992. She is the current chief executive officer of the sanctuary, which she renamed to Big Cat Rescue sometime after Lewis's disappearance in 1997. She has used social media such as Facebook and YouTube and her "The Cat Chat" podcast to promote activism against private zoos.

Exotic engaged in a pattern of harassment against Baskin, including trademark infringement. In 2013, a court ordered him to pay Baskin $1 million in damages, leading to his bankruptcy. In 2020, he was convicted of attempting to hire a hitman to kill her.

=== Howard Baskin ===
Howard Gene Baskin is an American animal rights activist and the third husband of Carole Baskin. He and Carole met in November 2002 at a kick-off party for the newly formed No More Homeless Pets organization. He joined Big Cat Rescue soon after as chairman of the advisory board. He proposed to her in November 2003, and they married in November 2004.

=== Doc Antle ===
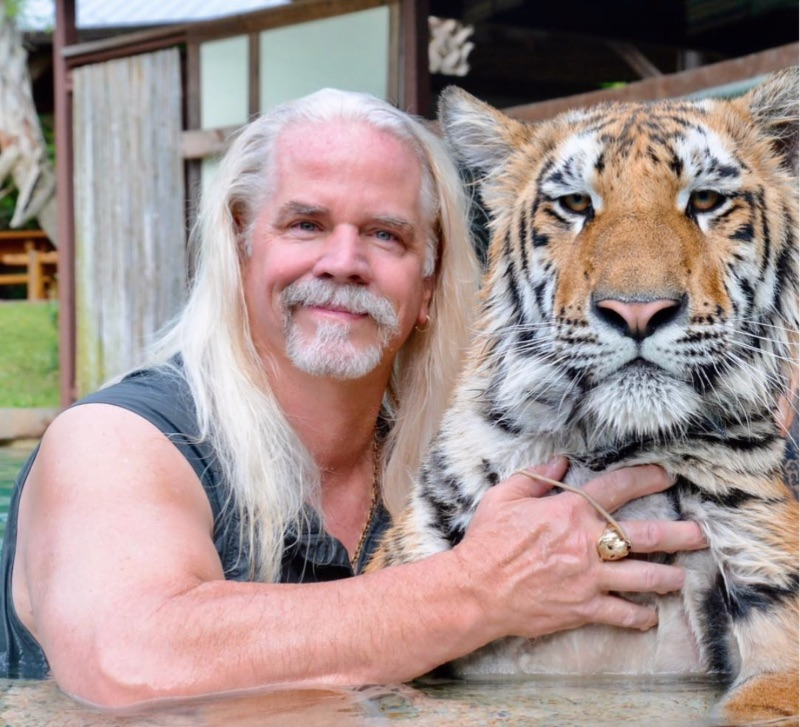
Doc Antle, the third most well-known subject in Tiger King

Mahamayavi Bhagavan Antle (born March 16, 1960), better known as Doc Antle, is an American animal trainer and private zoo operator. He is the founder and director of The Institute for Greatly Endangered and Rare Species (T.I.G.E.R.S.) in Myrtle Beach, South Carolina and Myrtle Beach Safari, a tour that runs through the facility. He is a self-described conservationist and is the executive director of a Rare Species Fund, although the extent to which this funds conservation projects has been disputed.

Antle was fined by the USDA for abandoning deer and peacocks at his zoo in Buckingham, Virginia in 1989. In total, Antle has more than 35 USDA violations for mistreating animals. In late December 2019, South Carolina Law Enforcement Division, South Carolina Department of Natural Resources and Horry County Police Department raided Doc Antle's Myrtle Beach Safari. Antle said the agencies came to collect DNA samples from three young lions that descended from Wilson's Wild Animal Park in Virginia which was closed down due to animal welfare issues.

In Tiger King, Antle's facility was described as a personality cult, and Exotic accused him of killing tigers in gas chambers to make space for further breeding. Antle has faced criticism from conservation organizations and animal rights groups for his treatment of animals, and was indicted on 15 charges related to wildlife trafficking and animal cruelty in 2020.

=== Rick Kirkham ===
Rick Kirkham is an American filmmaker. He began his career as a reporter for Inside Edition who appeared on a segment called "Inside Adventure". From the age of 14, he filmed more than 3,000 hours of a video diary; this included footage during his tenure on Inside Edition during which he was addicted to crack cocaine.

As an interviewee in Tiger King, Kirkham did not receive royalties from the show, but allowed Goode and Chaiklin to use footage of Exotic he owned for a few thousand dollars. Kirkham is featured prominently throughout the documentary, remarking that he's "never experienced anything like Joe Exotic" and denying involvement in the 2015 G.W. Zoo fire. He also claimed that Travis Maldonado wasn't gay.

=== Jeff Lowe ===
Jeff Lowe is an American Las Vegas playboy and former zookeeper. He and his wife Lauren gained ownership of the Greater Wynewood Exotic Animal Park for legal reasons. Following Exotic's retirement from the zoo in 2018 Lowe remained as the zoo's owner, renaming it "Tiger King Park", until mid-2020 when a court awarded ownership of the property to the Baskins, and Lowe's USDA exhibitor's license was suspended due to poor veterinary care. Rather than contesting the suspension, Lowe permanently shut down the park on August 18.

=== Lauren Lowe ===
Lauren Lowe is an American former zookeeper who is Jeff's wife. She and her husband gained ownership of the Greater Wynewood Exotic Animal Park for legal reasons. In mid-2020, Lowe and the other zookeepers had to leave the property when a court awarded ownership of it to the Baskins.

=== John Reinke ===
John Reinke is an American former employee of the Greater Wynewood Exotic Animal Park, working closely with Joe Exotic. Before his career as a zookeeper, Reinke worked as a bungee jumper. He lost his legs in an accident in April 1994, and worked at the Greater Wynnewood Exotic Animal Park starting in 2006. During Exotic's trial in 2019, Reinke was refused the right to testify in court.

=== Kelci "Saff" Saffery ===
Kelci "Saff" Saffery, better known as Saff, is an American veteran who served in both the Afghanistan and Iraq wars and worked as a manager for the Greater Wynnewood Exotic Animal Park for almost ten years. In 2013, the then-27 year old was bitten by one of the tigers after he mistakenly put his arm into its cage. He opted to have his left forearm amputated and return to work within a week, instead of undergoing a two-year series of surgeries that might have saved his arm. He is hoping to get a prosthetic arm. In 2018, Saffery disconnected from the G.W. zoo and everyone involved.

=== John Finlay ===
John "Gator" Finlay is a former employee at the Greater Wynewood Exotic Animal Park, and was one of Exotic's partners. Finlay and Exotic were in a relationship for several years, but they never legally married. He became famous after Tiger King because of his missing teeth, which many viewers speculated was due to constant drug use. However, Finlay revealed that he has been sober and clean for over six years. Finlay eventually received new teeth implants in July 2019.

=== Travis Maldonado ===
Travis Maldonado was an American employee at the Greater Wynewood Exotic Animal Park and the second husband of Exotic. Maldonado arrived at the Greater Wynewood Exotic Animal Park in late 2013. In Tiger King, Maldonado was shown getting upset over Exotic not meeting him somewhere, claiming beforehand that Exotic doesn't care about his problems or what he does at the zoo. Before meeting Exotic over punching the meat truck, Maldonado jokingly asked if he's "trying to make him blow his top."

Under the influence of drugs, Maldonado would frequently point guns at other people at the park, including Exotic's campaign manager Joshua Dial, who told Maldonado to stop. Maldonado tried to convince Dial that the gun was a Ruger with no magazine in it, and that Rugers do not fire without a magazine. On October 6, 2017, Maldonado put the gun to his own head in front of Dial to prove his point, but the gun fired, despite not having a magazine in it, killing Maldonado when he pulled the trigger and traumatising Dial. Exotic told TM that his "entire soul died" afterwards, and told the press that Maldonado's death was an accident, thinking his gun would not go off without the magazine in it.

=== Dillon Passage ===
Dillon Passage is Exotic's third husband. Passage and Exotic married on December 11, 2017, two months after the death of Exotic's previous husband, Travis Maldonado. One of the witnesses of the wedding between Passage and Exotic was Maldonado's mother.

In March 2021, Passage revealed on Instagram that he and Exotic are seeking a divorce, but remain on good terms and that he will continue to have Exotic in his life. The day after Passage announced that he and Exotic were divorcing, Exotic's lawyer Francisco Hernandez told Us Weekly that they planned to "stay married right now so things don't get complicated". In July 2021, Passage announced his relationship with another man; John. The divorce was finalized in March 2023.

=== Joshua Dial ===
Joshua Dial is an American who worked as Exotic's campaign manager during both his run for President of the United States and his run for Governor of Oklahoma. Before meeting Exotic, Dial was a Walmart manager who had recently graduated from the University of Science and Arts with a degree in political science. He was arrested in 2017 for aggravated assault and battery, after attacking another man with a sword.

He became Exotic's campaign manager to gain experience for a potential future career in politics. For his run for Governor of Oklahoma, Exotic appointed Dial to run the entire campaign. On October 6, 2017, Dial witnessed the death of Travis Maldonado. Tiger King includes the CCTV footage of Dial sitting in an office talking to Maldonado and then looked severely distressed after witnessing Maldonado's accidental death. In Tiger King, Dial explained the situation to the viewers;

I was sitting in a chair looking at him when he put a gun to his head. It's not like on the movies... I knew he was dead the second he pulled the trigger, but at the same time, I didn't. I thought it was a joke.

Dial resigned from Exotic's campaign in June 2018, and posted this statement to Facebook on the first anniversary of his decision to step down as Exotic's campaign manager;

This month will make one year since I resigned as campaign manager for Joe. After watching his husband kill himself in my office, it's understating the matter by saying it was a rough campaign to work. In the past year, I've been doing some political soul-searching.

After the success of Tiger King, Dial revealed that he has moved on from everything that happened at the G.W. Zoo, but still lives in Oklahoma and is engaged to be married. He retains his interest in politics, and has campaigned for gay rights.

=== James Garretson ===
James Garretson is an American former employee at the Greater Wynewood Exotic Animal Park, who worked with Exotic for 20 years. He ultimately became a key figure in making the case against Exotic, becoming an FBI informant to assist in his conviction.

Garretson had a private collection of big cats but decided to focus on strip joints and bars, followed by a water recreation and jet ski rental business. In one episode of Tiger King, he is shown riding a jet ski as the song "Eye of the Tiger" plays in the background. He also referred to big cat people as "backstabbing pieces of shit". After the release of the first season of Tiger King, Garretson received death threats and hate mail for his role in Exotic's conviction.

=== Erik Cowie ===
Erik Cowie was an American employee at the Greater Wynnewood Exotic Animal Park. He was the head keeper at the zoo for five years. During Exotic's trial, Cowie alleged older tigers were shot and killed at the zoo.

In June 2021, Cowie was arrested and booked for driving under the influence of alcohol, and failed to appear for his sentencing. Three months later, Cowie was found dead in New York City, at the age of 53. Subsequent examinations ruled that his death was due to "acute and chronic alcohol use". The second season of Tiger King was dedicated in his memory.

=== Mario Tabraue ===
Mario Tabraue is a Cuban American zookeeper and former drug trafficker, who claimed to be the inspiration for Al Pacino's Tony Montana in the 1983 crime drama film Scarface. Tabraue was imprisoned for more than a decade on charges of racketeering and drug trafficking. During his trial, it was claimed that he attempted to dismember a federal informant's body with a machete.

=== Tim Stark ===
Tim Stark is an American former zoo owner, operating Wildlife in Need in Charlestown, Indiana. He owned a variety of exotic species and was a trading partner of Exotic, and has been accused of animal abuse on several occasions. In 2021, Stark was banned from acquiring, exhibiting and owning any exotic and native animals. Following the court meeting, Stark threatened suicide.

=== Don Lewis ===
Jack Donald Lewis (April 30, 1938 – legal d. August 19, 2002) is an American former zoo owner and missing person who disappeared on the morning of August 18, 1997, after leaving his home in Tampa, Florida. The investigation into his disappearance has stretched from Lewis's Wildlife on Easy Street sanctuary in Tampa, co-owned with his second wife Carole Baskin, to land owned by Lewis in Costa Rica. No evidence of Lewis being killed has surfaced, but investigators believe it is unlikely that he disappeared on his own. Lewis left behind over $5 million in assets. He was declared legally dead in 2002 on the fifth anniversary of his disappearance. As of 2021, the criminal case is still open with no arrests or charges made. Lewis's daughters have recently hired attorney John Michael Phillips and filed a lawsuit against Baskin, seeking information about his death and fraud to documents. Lewis's disappearance was covered in the third episode of Tiger King.

Lewis and Baskin met on Nebraska Avenue in Tampa. She and Lewis engaged in an affair while both were still married. She became one of Lewis's many girlfriends and substantially grew his wealth by helping him buy and sell real estate in 1984. The pair divorced their respective spouses and subsequently married in 1991. According to Baskin, Lewis was obsessed with sex and would frequently fly to Costa Rica, where he had substantial real estate holdings, to have affairs – timing the trips for whenever she was menstruating. In July 1997, Lewis filed a restraining order against her, claiming that she had threatened to kill him; the restraining order was rejected. Baskin claims that he filed the restraining order because she would haul off some of his "junk" property whenever he visited Costa Rica. Lewis continued to live with Baskin afterwards. Lewis told her multiple times that he wanted a divorce, but she did not think he was ever serious about it. She claimed he was diagnosed with bipolar disorder months before he vanished.

Lewis disappeared in August 1997 and was declared legally dead in 2002. A dispute ensued between Baskin and the children of Lewis over his estate, with Baskin prevailing as the primary beneficiary. The case of Lewis' disappearance is still active as of early 2021.

=== Barbara Fisher ===
Barbara Fisher is an American former employee of Doc Antle's T.I.G.E.R.S. facility. In Tiger King, she claimed that he and Antle's other apprentices (mostly young women) had to live in squalor, get pitiful money, and many felt compelled to sleep with Antle in order to advance in his programme. According to Fisher, she was pressured to get breast implants because the park desired "sexy" ladies to be featured.

Antle heavily criticised Fisher's accusations against him and his facitility, calling Fisher's claims "the ramblings of a crazy child who has a lot of, in my opinion, issues and somehow those have boiled up." In response, Fisher said "Calling people who criticize or (even disagree with him) 'crazy' is a boilerplate response from Bhagavan. When any of my friends asked what I thought his response might be before the release of the documentary, I said 'he will call me crazy and try to minimize my involvement.' That is exactly what he has done."

=== Rachel Starr ===
Rachel Starr is an adult film star from Dallas, Texas. Starr quickly grew to fame by working with various production companies such as Bangbros, Brazzers, and Naughty America to name a few. Although brief, Starr's appearance in the Tiger King series grabbed the attention of fans. Joe Exotic and Rachel Starr's friendship goes back about a decade. Exotic and Starr's friendship began in 2013 when a mutual colleague of theirs asked Starr to do a photoshoot with Exotic in Wynnewood, Oklahoma. Starr and Exotic worked together in 2021 when Exotic released his first collection of NFTs from prison.

=== Shaquille O'Neal ===
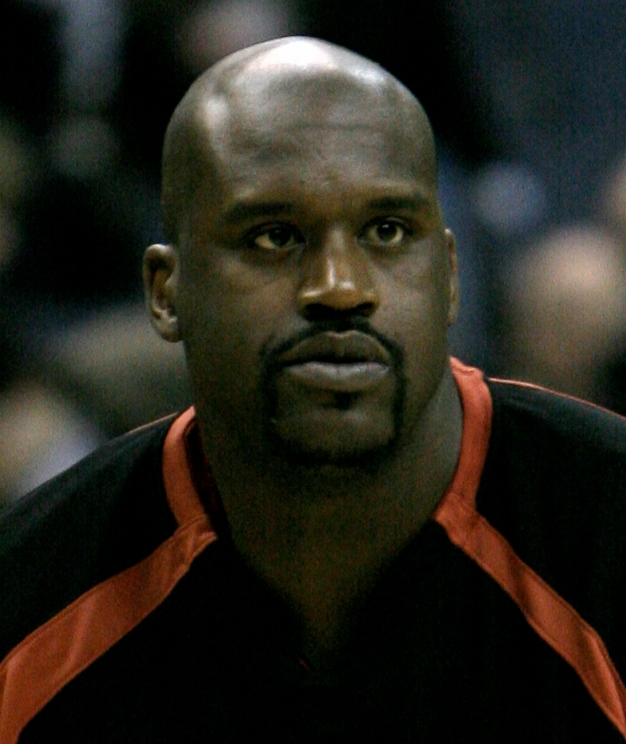
Shaquille O'Neal in 2007. One of his visits to the Greater Wynnewood Exotic Animal Park was featured in the first episode of Tiger King.

Shaquille Rashaun O'Neal (/ʃəˈkiːl/ shə-KEEL; born March 6, 1972), known commonly as "Shaq" (/ʃæk/ SHAK), is an American former professional basketball player who is a sports analyst on the television program Inside the NBA. O'Neal is regarded as one of the greatest basketball players and centers of all time. He was a 7-foot-1-inch (2.16 m) and 325-pound (147 kg) center who played for six teams over his 19-year career in the National Basketball Association (NBA) and is a four-time NBA champion.

In addition to his basketball career, O'Neal has released four rap albums, with his first, Shaq Diesel, going platinum. O'Neal is also an electronic music producer, and touring DJ, known as DIESEL. He has appeared in numerous films and has starred in his own reality shows, Shaq's Big Challenge and Shaq Vs.. He hosts The Big Podcast with Shaq. He became a minority owner of the Sacramento Kings in 2013 and is the general manager of Kings Guard Gaming of the NBA 2K League.

O'Neal visited the Greater Wynnewood Exotic Animal Park on several occasions. During these visits, he took pictures of the animals at the facility and met Exotic. One of these visits is featured briefly in the first episode of Tiger King, causing viewers to speculate that O'Neal was one of Exotic's friends and trading partners. On his podcast The Big Podcast with Shaq, O'Neal denied having any personal dealings with Exotic;

I don't harm tigers. I love tigers. I love white tigers. Do I put donations to these zoos to help these tigers out? I do all the time. Do I own tigers personally at my house? No. But I love tigers. Listen, people are going to make their own opinions, but, again, I was just a visitor. I met this guy—not my friend. I don't know him. Never had any business dealings with him, and I had no idea any of that stuff was going on.

== Introduced in Season 2 ==
=== Brian Rhyne ===
Brian Rhyne was an American citizen and the first husband of Joe Exotic. They were together for 16 years, beginning in 1985 and ending in 2001 when Rhyne died from HIV complications.

=== Donald Trump ===
Donald Trump is an American businessman and television personality who served as the 45th President of the United States from 2017 to 2021. He was reelected to a non-consecutive second term in November 2024.

During a COVID-19 press conference in April 2020, Tiger King and the possibility of Exotic receiving a pardon was a topic of conversation. Trump claimed that he would "take a look", but ultimately did not pardon Exotic throughout the remainder of his presidency.
