= Joe vs. Carole =

Drama limited series by Etan Frankel

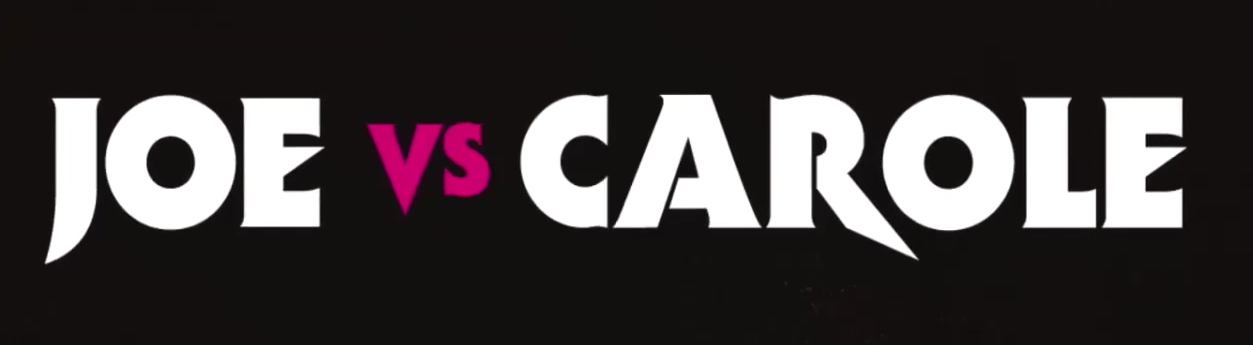
- Genre: Drama
- Created by: Etan Frankel
- Based on: Joe Exotic: Tiger King by: Robert Moor; Matthew Shaer; Eric Benson
- Directed by: Justin Tipping; Natalie Bailey
- Starring: John Cameron Mitchell; Kate McKinnon; Kyle MacLachlan; Dean Winters; Brian Van Holt; William Fichtner; Nat Wolff; Sam Keeley; Lex Mayson; Joel Marsh Garland; Marlo Kelly; Aliandra Calabrese; Kenneth Radley
- Country of origin: United States
- Original language: English
- No. of seasons: 1
- No. of episodes: 8

Production
- Executive producers: Kate McKinnon; Etan Frankel; Hernan Lopez; Marshall Lewy; Aaron Hart; Alex Katsnelson
- Production locations: Brisbane, Australia; Queensland
- Running time: 46-54 min.
- Production companies: Matchbox Pictures; Wondery; Universal Content Productions

Original release
- Network: Peacock
- Release: March 3, 2022

Joe vs. Carole is an American drama television limited series created by Etan Frankel. It stars John Cameron Mitchell, Kate McKinnon, Kyle MacLachlan, Dean Winters, Brian Van Holt, William Fichtner, Nat Wolff, Sam Keeley, Lex Mayson, Joel Marsh Garland, Marlo Kelly, Kenneth Radley and Aliandra Calabrese. The series began streaming on Peacock on March 3, 2022.

The series is based on the second season of Wondery's Over My Dead Body podcast, entitled Joe Exotic: Tiger King (before being retitled to Joe vs. Carole), which follows the criminal case of Joe Exotic, a zookeeper who has been convicted of murder-for-hire. The series received mixed reviews upon release.

== Cast ==
=== Main ===
- John Cameron Mitchell as Joe Exotic
- Kate McKinnon as Carole Baskin
- Kyle MacLachlan as Howard Baskin
- Dean Winters as Jeff Lowe
- Brian Van Holt as John Reinke
- William Fichtner as Rick Kirkham
- Nat Wolff as Travis Maldonado
- Sam Keeley as John Finlay
- Lex Mayson as Kelci 'Saff' Saffery
- Joel Marsh Garland as James Garretson
- Marlo Kelly as Jamie Murdock
- Aliandra Calabrese as Lauren Lowe
- Kenneth Radley as Allen Glover

=== Recurring ===
- Jack Scott as Joshua Dial
- Will McNeill as Tyler
- David Wenham as Don Lewis
- Jenna Owen as Amber
- Nic English as Brian Rhyne
- Benedict Hardie as Agent Thomas
- Shareena Clanton as Valerie
- Alexandra Jensen as Chealsi
- Anthony Sharpe as Erik Cowie
- Damien Garvey as Doc Antle
- Caroline Brazier as Elizabeth Huntley
- Angie Milliken as Crystal

== Episodes ==
No.	Title	Directed by	Written by	Original release date
1	"Unwanted Animals"	Justin Tipping	Etan Frankel	March 3, 2022
2	"Sanctuary"	Justin Tipping	Laura Jacqmin	March 3, 2022
3	"Don"	Justin Tipping	Alex Katsnelson	March 3, 2022
4	"A Gun-Toting, Animal Loving, Mullet Wearing Mother… Star"	Justin Tipping	Keli Goff	March 3, 2022
5	"The Tiger King"	Natalie Bailey	Corina Maritescu	March 3, 2022
6	"A Fairy Tale"	Natalie Bailey	Donnetta Lavinia Grays	March 3, 2022
7	"The Florida Problem"	Natalie Bailey	Laura Jacqmin	March 3, 2022
8	"Survival of the Fittest"	Justin Tipping	Etan Frankel	March 3, 2022

== Production ==
=== Development ===
In March 2020, following the commercial success of the Netflix series Tiger King, development started on a limited series adaptation of Carole Baskin's life, headed by Universal Content Productions, with Kate McKinnon executive producing and portraying Baskin, and is based on Joe Exotic: Tiger King, later retitled to Joe vs Carole, which is the second season of Wondery's Over My Dead Body podcast. The series was expected to air on NBC, Peacock, and USA Network. In May 2021, it was announced that the series would instead be streaming exclusively on Peacock. The series was created by Etan Frankel, who also served as writer and executive producer, while Justin Tipping directed the first four episodes, including the pilot. It was also announced that Natalie Bailey would direct episodes five, six, and seven.

On January 21, 2022, the show's title was announced, and its March 3, 2022 release date was revealed in the first trailer. The show later made its linear premiere on the latter network in October 2022.

=== Casting ===
In June 2021, Dean Winters, John Cameron Mitchell, Brian Van Holt, Sam Keeley, Nat Wolff, and Dennis Quaid were cast to portray Jeff Lowe, Joe Exotic, John Reinke, John Finlay, Travis Maldonado, and Rick Kirkham, respectively. In July 2021, William Fichtner replaced Quaid in the role of Kirkham. In the same month, Kyle MacLachlan, Lex Mayson, Joel Marsh Garland, Marlo Kelly, and Aliandra Calabrese joined the series, to portray Howard Baskin, Kelci "Saff" Saffery, James Garretson, Jamie Murdock, and Lauren Lowe respectively. In September 2021, Will McNeill, Jack Scott, Jenna Owen, Nic English, Benedict Hardie, Shareena Clanton, Alexandra Jensen, and Anthony Sharpe were revealed to have been added to the supporting cast during production, to portray Tyler, Joshua Dial, Amber, Brian Rhyne, Agent Thomas, Susan, Chealsi, and Erik Cowie, respectively.

=== Filming ===
By September 2021, filming occurred in areas around Queensland, Australia, including Screen Queensland Studios, which doubled for Oklahoma and Florida. In October 2021, due to filming commitments with Joe vs. Carole, McKinnon was precluded from appearing in the first seven episodes of season 47 of Saturday Night Live.

== Critical response ==
On Review aggregator Rotten Tomatoes it has a rating of 33% based on 27 reviews, with an average rating of 5.40/10. The website's critics consensus reads, "Kate McKinnon and John Cameron Mitchell do an admirable job of bringing these larger-than-life figures back down to earth, but Joe vs. Carole feels like a pale retread of an already overdone tale." Metacritic assigned the series a weighted average score of 53 out of 100 based on 17 critics, indicating "mixed or average" reviews.
