= Over My Dead Body (podcast) =

True crime podcast

- Genre: True crime
- Language: English

Creative team
- Written by: Matthew Shaer and Eric Benson

Cast and voices
- Hosted by: Matthew Shaer (Season 1) and Robert Moor (Season 2)

Publication
- No. of seasons: 4
- No. of episodes: 36
- Original release: January 29, 2019 – present
- Provider: Wondery

Related
- Website: wondery.com/shows/over-my-dead-body/

Over My Dead Body is an American true crime podcast hosted by Matthew Shaer (season 1) and Robert Moor (season 2), and produced by Wondery. The podcast premiered on January 29, 2019, and consists of 19 episodes.

The first season covers the trial of the murder of Dan Markel, while the second season follows the case of Joe Exotic, a zookeeper who has been convicted for murder-for-hire. The second season was adapted into a television series starring Kate McKinnon as Carole Baskin.

== Reception ==
In Podcast Review, Alice Florence Orr called the first season disappointing, saying it is "an underwhelming story of love gone wrong".
