= Tiger King =

True crime documentary series

- Promotional poster for the first season
- Also known as: Murder, Mayhem, and Madness; Tiger King 2; The Doc Antle Story
- Genre: True crime Documentary
- Directed by: Eric Goode; Rebecca Chaiklin
- Presented by: Joel McHale (2020 Special)
- Starring: Joe Exotic; Carole Baskin; Bhagavan "Doc" Antle; John Finlay; Rick Kirkham; John Reinke; Kelci "Saff" Saffery; Jeff Lowe; Erik Cowie; Howard Baskin; Travis Maldonado; Dillon Passage; Tim Stark; Rachel Starr
- Composers: Mark Mothersbaugh; John Enroth; Albert Fox; Aaron Kaplan; Bob Mothersbaugh
- Country of origin: United States
- Original language: English
- No. of seasons: 3
- No. of episodes: 15 (+1 special)

Production
- Executive producers: Chris Smith; Fisher Stevens; Eric Goode; Rebecca Chaiklin
- Cinematography: Damien Drake
- Editors: Doug Abel; Nicholas Biagetti; Dylan Hansen-Fliedner; Daniel Koehler; Geoffrey Richman
- Running time: 41–48 minutes

Original release
- Network: Netflix
- Release: March 20, 2020 – December 12, 2021

Tiger King (subtitled in marketing as Tiger King: Murder, Mayhem, and Madness for its first season, Tiger King 2 for its second season and Tiger King: The Doc Antle Story for its third season) is an American true crime documentary television series about the life of former zookeeper and convicted felon Joe Exotic. The first season was released on Netflix on March 20, 2020. A second season, Tiger King 2, was announced in September 2021 and was released on November 17, 2021, while a third season, Tiger King: The Doc Antle Story, was announced on December 3, 2021, and released one week later on December 12. The series focuses on the small but deeply interconnected society of big cat conservationists such as Carole Baskin, owner of Big Cat Rescue, and collectors such as Exotic, whom Baskin accuses of abusing and exploiting wild animals.

Season 1 received positive reviews from critics, and according to Nielsen ratings, was watched by 34.3 million people over its first ten days of release, ranking as one of Netflix's most successful releases to date, partly due to its release amid the early months of the COVID-19 pandemic, and also inspired several memes online. Despite its success and popularity, the season received criticism from conservation and animal rights groups for its framing and inaccuracies related to private breeding and wildlife conservation issues. A special aftershow hosted by Joel McHale was released on April 12, 2020, with McHale interviewing several of its subjects about Exotic and the series itself. The second and third seasons in contrast received mostly negative reviews from fans and critics, and the former was subject of a lawsuit by Carole and Howard Baskin over footage used in the series.

== Summary ==
The series explores the deeply interconnected community of big cat conservationists and collectors in America, and the private zoos and animal sanctuaries they have set up for the care and public display of these animals.

The series' primary subject in the first season is "Tiger King" Joe Exotic, the eccentric owner of the G.W. Zoo in Wynnewood, Oklahoma, and follows his bitter years-long feud with Carole Baskin, CEO of Big Cat Rescue in Tampa, Florida. The season later records the events leading up to Exotic's conviction under federal murder-for-hire statutes, when it comes to light that he paid a hitman to murder Baskin; his convictions also included violations of the Lacey Act and Endangered Species Act, and resulted in a 22-year federal prison sentence.

The second season covers the immediate aftermath of Exotic's imprisonment, as well as exploring further theories surrounding the disappearance of Don Lewis. It also explores the downfall of big cat collectors Tim Stark and Jeff Lowe. The ending of the season features a tribute to Erik Cowie, an employee at the G.W. Zoo who died in September 2021.

The series' primary subject in the third season is Mahamayavi Bhagavan "Doc" Antle, a rival of Exotic's and Baskin's, exploring his cult of employment.

== Cast ==
Tiger King Cast Members
Cast member	Seasons		
Cast member	1	2	3: The Doc Antle Story
John Reinke	Main	Main	
Kelci Saffery	Main	Main	—N/a
Joe Exotic	Main	Main	
Doc Antle	Main	—N/a	Main
Carole Baskin	Main	Main	
Donna Pettis	Friend	Main	—N/a
Zuzana & Scott Kukol	—N/a	Main	—N/a
Kristi Reinke	Guest	Friend	
Friends of Tiger King
Allen Glover	Guest	Friend	
Lauren L.	Guest	Guest	

== Episodes ==
=== Series overview ===
Season	Subtitle	Episodes	Originally released
1	Murder, Mayhem, and Madness	7	March 20, 2020
Special: The Tiger King and I			April 12, 2020
2	Tiger King 2	5	November 17, 2021
3	The Doc Antle Story	3	December 12, 2021

=== Season 1: Murder, Mayhem, and Madness (2020) ===
No. overall	No. in season	Title	Directed by	Original release date
1	1	"Not Your Average Joe"	Eric Goode & Rebecca Chaiklin	March 20, 2020
2	2	"Cult of Personality"	Eric Goode & Rebecca Chaiklin	March 20, 2020
3	3	"The Secret"	Eric Goode & Rebecca Chaiklin	March 20, 2020
4	4	"Playing with Fire"	Eric Goode & Rebecca Chaiklin	March 20, 2020
5	5	"Make America Exotic Again"	Eric Goode & Rebecca Chaiklin	March 20, 2020
6	6	"The Noble Thing to Do"	Eric Goode & Rebecca Chaiklin	March 20, 2020
7	7	"Dethroned"	Eric Goode & Rebecca Chaiklin	March 20, 2020

=== Special: The Tiger King and I (2020) ===
No. overall	No. in season	Title	Directed by	Original release date
8	1	"The Tiger King and I"	Eric Goode & Rebecca Chaiklin	April 12, 2020

=== Season 2: Tiger King 2 (2021) ===
No. overall	No. in season	Title	Directed by	Original release date
9	1	"Beg Your Pardon"	Eric Goode & Rebecca Chaiklin	November 17, 2021
10	2	"The Carole Diaries"	Eric Goode & Rebecca Chaiklin	November 17, 2021
11	3	"Bounty Hunting"	Eric Goode & Rebecca Chaiklin	November 17, 2021
12	4	"The Lyin' King"	Eric Goode & Rebecca Chaiklin	November 17, 2021
13	5	"Stark Raving Mad"	Eric Goode & Rebecca Chaiklin	November 17, 2021

=== Season 3: The Doc Antle Story (2021) ===
No. overall	No. in season	Title	Directed by	Original release date
14	1	"What's Up, Doc?"	Eric Goode & Rebecca Chaiklin	December 12, 2021
15	2	"The Great Escape"	Eric Goode & Rebecca Chaiklin	December 12, 2021
16	3	"Don't Trust Bhagavan"	Eric Goode & Rebecca Chaiklin	December 12, 2021

== Subjects ==
=== Joe Exotic's team ===
- Joe Exotic – Founder of G.W. Zoo
- John Finlay – Joe's boyfriend
- John Reinke – Manager at G.W. Zoo
- Kelci "Saff" Saffery – Zookeeper at G.W. Zoo
- Erik Cowie – Zookeeper at G.W. Zoo
- Rick Kirkham – TV producer at JoeExoticTV
- Travis Maldonado – Straight ex-husband of Joe
- Joshua Dial – Joe's campaign leader
- Dillon Passage – husband (later ex-husband) of Joe
- JP Wilson – Magician who performed with Joe
- Brian Rhyne – Romantic partner of Joe

=== Other subjects featured ===
- Carole Baskin – CEO at Big Cat Rescue
- Doc Antle – Director of The Institute for Greatly Endangered and Rare Species (T.I.G.E.R.S.)
- Barbara Fisher – Former employee at T.I.G.E.R.S.
- Mario Tabraue – Zoo owner and former drug trafficker
- Howard Baskin – Husband of Carole
- Don Lewis - Ex-husband of Carole who has been missing since 1997
- Jeff Lowe – Second and final owner of G.W. Zoo
- Lauren Lowe – Wife of Jeff
- Allen Glover – Hired as hitman in Carole Baskin murder-for-hire plot
- James Garretson – Investor in G.W. Zoo
- Tim Stark – Founder of Wildlife in Need
- Donald Trump – 45th and 47th President of the United States
- Joel McHale – Host of after-show

== Reception ==
=== Critical response ===
==== Season 1 ====
On review aggregator Rotten Tomatoes, the first series holds an approval rating of 89% based on 75 reviews, with an average rating of 7.88/10. The site's critics consensus reads: "A bizarre true crime story you have to see to believe, Tiger King is a messy and captivating portrait of obsession gone terribly wrong." On Metacritic, which assigns a weighted average score to reviews from mainstream publications, the series has an average score of 75 out of 100, based on 13 critics, indicating "generally favorable reviews".

Variety magazine's Caroline Framke called the season "messy yet compelling" and that for "those who love Netflix's particular flavor of true crime and docuseries, [...] Tiger King will undoubtedly scratch a particular itch." Joshua Rivera at The Verge said that "[e]very minute of Tiger King yields some new surprise, an unbelievable turn or charismatic stranger with incredible stories to tell."

Although the season had a positive reception overall, the special aftershow hosted by McHale received criticism.

==== Season 2 ====
The second series received mostly negative reviews, holding an approval rating of 19% on Rotten Tomatoes based on 21 reviews, with an average rating of 4.10/10. The site's critics consensus reads: "With nothing substantive to add save for a salacious celebration of its first season's success, this kitty has no claws."

Kristen Lopez of IndieWire said that second series has a story that "feels like it's being made up in the moment" and that "Netflix's second season of Tiger King feels like a blatant grab for cash". Brian Lowry of CNN also criticized the second series for failing to move the story on from the first series, saying: "Adding relatively little to the story, and jumping all over the place, the project is mostly defined by how self-referential it is." In a review in The Times, Liam Fay noted the season suffered from the lack of participation from Carole Baskin, saying that "her contributions are taken from her YouTube channel, an eerily stilted production in which she reads her diaries directly to camera", and: "Almost every theory ever concocted about Lewis's fate is explored at length. In the end we're none the wiser, a familiar aftertaste throughout the season."

==== Season 3 ====
Tiger King: The Doc Antle Story holds an approval rating of 0% on Rotten Tomatoes based on 5 reviews. Jordan Moreau of Variety wrote that "despite its serious subject matter, 'The Doc Antle Story' can't match the inherent, attention-grabbing, plot-twisty nature of the first [season]".

=== Audience viewership ===
According to Nielsen, the first season was watched by 34.3 million people over its first 10 days of release, ranking as one of Netflix's most successful releases to date. It has been suggested that its viewership success was aided by the COVID-19 pandemic, which caused many global viewers to be restricted to their homes around the time of its release. At their Q2 report meeting in July 2020, Netflix reported the first season had been viewed by 64 million households over its first month of release.

=== Political reception ===
At an April press conference regarding COVID-19, then-U.S. President Donald Trump was questioned about the possibility of pardoning the series' key subject, Joe Exotic. Trump said he was unaware of him and the series but told the reporter that he'd "take a look". In January 2021, prior to the inauguration of Joe Biden, Trump pardoned several different people, but Exotic was not one of them. Exotic tweeted that he was "too innocent and too gay" to receive a pardon from Trump.

=== Criticism for depiction of conservation issues ===
Animal welfare groups, conservation organizations and wildlife biologists have criticized the series and its filmmakers.

Several conservation and animal rights groups criticized the filmmakers for framing private big cat breeding as a legitimate form of conservation. Representatives from Wildlife Conservation Society, World Wide Fund for Nature, Panthera Corporation and National Geographic criticized the show for its equivocation of the unregulated private breeding with captive breeding for species reintroduction, highlighting that the latter is strictly controlled by the Species Survival Plan and only takes place in zoos accredited by the Association of Zoos and Aquariums. Privately bred cats cannot be reintroduced to the wild as several of the private breeders interviewed suggested, as they would be unlikely to survive in the wild, and are likely hybrids which could cause genetic pollution.

The filmmakers were also criticized for implying that roadside zoo operations are as legitimate as accredited zoos, and Big Cat Rescue specifically. The first season and director singled out Big Cat Rescue's enclosures as small or not meeting ethical standards, but their facilities meet humane standards set out by Global Federation of Animal Sanctuaries, unlike those of the featured private breeders' zoos. Elle noted that Baskin was portrayed as hypocritical for keeping the tigers in captivity instead of releasing them, without explaining that doing so was not an option—being captive-bred from mixed stock, as well as in-effect domesticated, meant they were unsuited to either survive in the wild or rebuild regional populations. Michael Webber, director of The Elephant in the Living Room, also criticized the parallels drawn between the private zoos and Big Cat Rescue. The first season was also accused of minimizing Baskin's efforts to lobby Congress for stricter legislation on animal trafficking.

"Goode brings to Tiger King the intellectual rigor and social responsibility of ... a nightclub and hotel developer", Peter Frick-Wright, who had produced Cat People, a podcast series covering the American big-cat industry, wrote in Outside. He found the first season particularly unfair to Baskin, pointing out that in focusing on her husband's disappearance so much it failed to distinguish her from Exotic and Antle, barely mentioning that Big Cat Rescue only accepts tigers confiscated by law enforcement or from owners who could no longer handle them—owners who had to sign a contract with heavy financial penalties if they owned another big cat or were even photographed with one, a provision not mentioned in the first season. Baskin also forbids volunteers or staff from touching the animals; they are fired for doing so, Frick-Wright wrote.

Others criticized the sympathetic portrayal of Joe Exotic. The director of Animals Asia Foundation expressed disappointment that the Netflix series "does not fully condemn many of the activities that [Exotic] was involved with" and criticized the filmmakers for downplaying the animal cruelty and commercial purposes of Exotic's zoo. Conversely, Baskin is the only source in the first season from the conservation sector, and the only source explaining why keeping the wild animals was abusive, but is depicted in an unsympathetic light.

Some criticism noted the lack of clear environmental or conservation message. An article in The New York Times drew parallels with other recent wildlife films like Blackfish, which had a major impact on their subject matter. Blackfish led to a severe drop in ticket sales at SeaWorld and reduced support for cetaceans in captivity, eventually leading to changes in legislation and practices. The producer of Blackfish criticized Tiger King, saying that issues surrounding big cats were "lost in the show's 'soap opera-esque drama'". Karl Ammann, a photographer and documentarian specializing in the illegal wildlife trade who was approached to be interviewed by the filmmakers of Tiger King, similarly expressed disappointment at the lack of conservation message in the first season, saying "to totally ignore such key aspects was a real missed opportunity".

PETA and the Humane Society of the United States, both of which had previously investigated and campaigned against the animal abuse of Exotic and other private breeders featured in the show, responded more positively to Tiger King for raising the profile of the issue of big cats in captivity. However, PETA noted the first season "largely skips over serious issues of animal welfare, including the horrors of cub trafficking and the problems with commercial cub-petting attractions".

=== Awards and nominations ===
Year	Award	Category	Nominee(s)	Result	Ref.
2020	Primetime Emmy Awards	Outstanding Documentary or Nonfiction Series	Chris Smith, Fisher Stevens, Eric Goode and Rebecca Chaiklin	Nominated	
2020	Primetime Emmy Awards	Outstanding Directing for a Documentary/Nonfiction Program	Eric Goode and Rebecca Chaiklin (for "Cult of Personality")	Nominated	
2020	Primetime Emmy Awards	Outstanding Music Composition for a Documentary Series or Special (Original Dramatic Score)	Mark Mothersbaugh, John Enroth and Albert Fox (for "Not Your Average Joe")	Nominated	
2020	Primetime Emmy Awards	Outstanding Picture Editing for Nonfiction Programming	Doug Abel, Nicholas Biagetti, Dylan Hansen-Fliedner, Geoffrey Richman and Daniel Kohler (for "Cult of Personality")	Nominated	
2020	Primetime Emmy Awards	Outstanding Sound Editing for a Nonfiction or Reality Program (Single or Multi-Camera)	Ian Cymore, Rachel Wardell and Steve Griffen (for "Cult of Personality")	Nominated	
2020	Primetime Emmy Awards	Outstanding Sound Mixing for a Nonfiction or Reality Program (Single or Multi-Camera)	Jose Araujo, Royce Sharp, Jack Neu and Ian Cymore (for "The Noble Thing to Do")	Nominated	
2021	Hollywood Music in Media Awards	Best Original Score in a Documentary TV Series	Mark Mothersbaugh, John Enroth, Albert Fox and Robert Mothersbaugh	Nominated	
2021	MTV Movie & TV Awards	Best Real-Life Mystery or Crime Series	Tiger King	Nominated	
2021	Producers Guild of America Awards	Outstanding Producer of Non-Fiction Television	Chris Smith, Fisher Stevens, Eric Goode and Rebecca Chaiklin	Nominated	

=== Response from those depicted ===
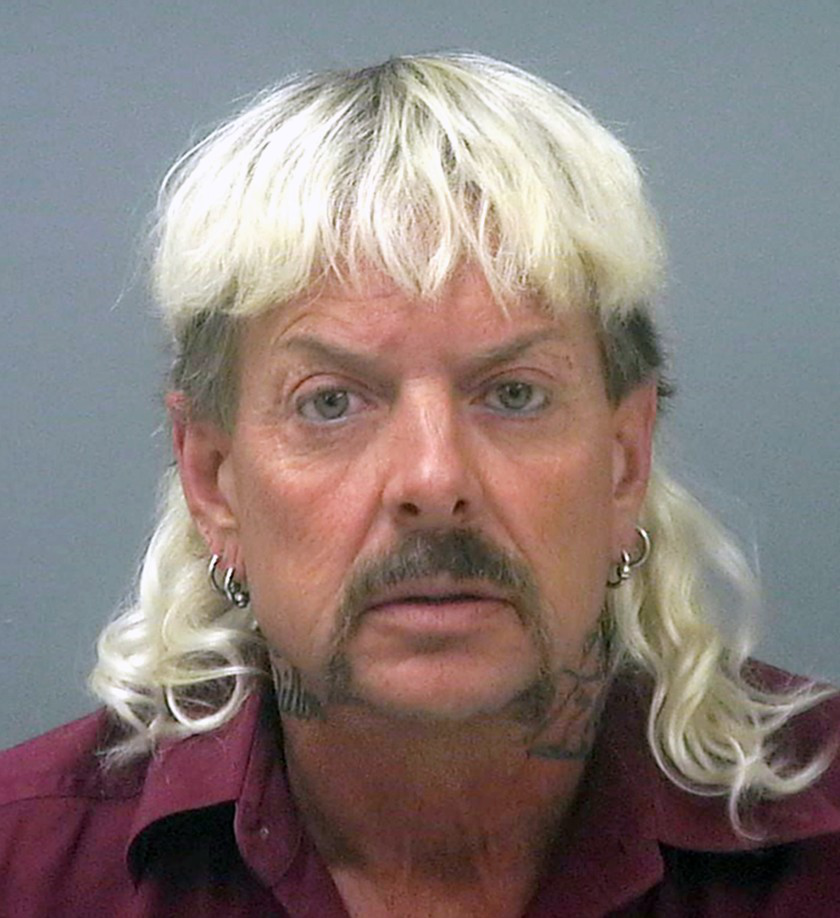
Joe Exotic, the main subject depicted in Tiger King, achieved a large following online and inspired several Internet memes. He has expressed regret for his past actions.

==== Joe Exotic ====
Joe Exotic is the main focus of the series, with the documentary causing him to receive significant amounts of attention on social media. Ironically, despite the first season being responsible for his worldwide fame and fanbase, he has not watched the series himself, due to being arrested prior to its release. Nevertheless, Netflix interviewed Exotic in jail, asking what he thinks of both the first season and his newfound fame. Exotic stated that he loved the fame, but wished he could experience it firsthand. He also expressed remorse for his actions after being in jail, stating to his fans;

Go sit in a cage with your animals for a week. I mean, when I left the zoo and I sent my chimpanzees to the sanctuary in Florida and imagined what my chimpanzees went through for 18 years, I'm ashamed of myself.

Exotic added that he's "done with the Carole Baskin saga." In 2021, he began criticising some of the other people featured in the documentary, stating that "not one person came forward until the Netflix series came out and they could profit from it." Joe claims to not have profited at all from the series. In the show's final arc, Joe is out of work and destitute, and law enforcement's noose finally closes in on him. As a result of the unilateral seizure of his zoo and other assets, Joe has authorized the creation of a cryptocurrency by the name of Tiger King Coin, to raise a fighting fund to finance the efforts of a dedicated legal team, led by John M Phillips, to overturn his conviction, which has been progressing since July 2021.

==== Carole Baskin ====
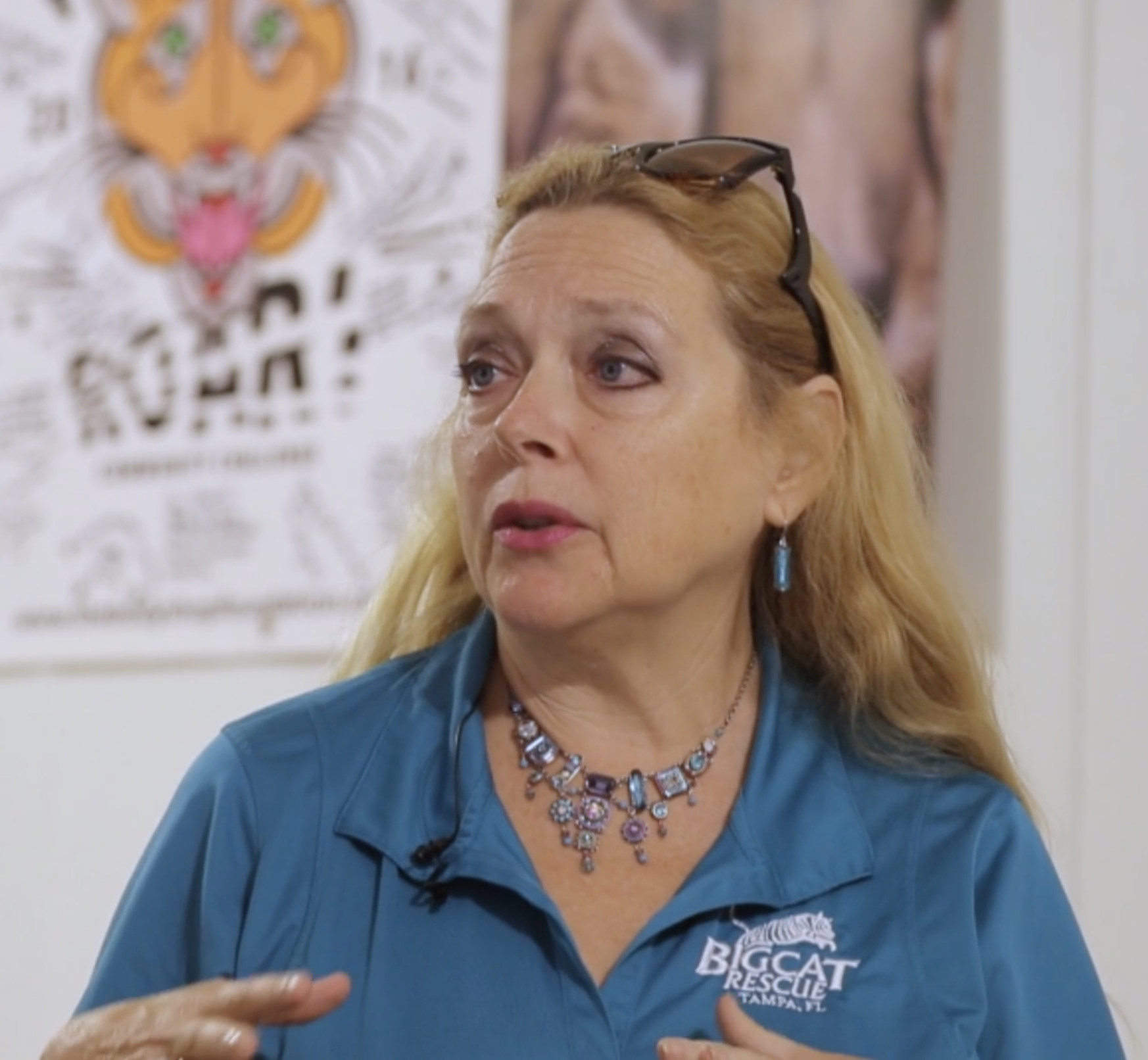
As a result of Tiger King, several Internet memes targeted Carole Baskin for her speculated involvement in the disappearance of Don Lewis, her second husband.

Carole Baskin and her husband Howard felt betrayed by filmmakers, stating she was told the discussion of Joe Exotic and Baskin's missing ex-husband were just for context.

In a post on the Big Cat Rescue website, Baskin said that the show "has a segment [in the third episode] devoted to suggesting, with lies and innuendos from people who are not credible, that I had a role in the disappearance of my husband Don 21 years ago" and that the first season "presents this without any regard for the truth". Baskin has never been charged with anything related to Don's disappearance and has always denied having anything to do with it. In partial response to Baskin, director Goode stated while he felt Baskin had the right intention, he questioned if "it was fair to keep these tigers in cages", adding that the tigers "pace neurotically" and that "Sometimes you wonder whether or not one should humanely euthanize these cats instead of [letting them] suffer in cages". Baskin preemptively answered that "... our goal is to end having them in cages and have no need for a sanctuary like ours. Our federal bill, the Big Cat Public Safety Act, would stop the cub petting that drives the breeding and end ownership as pets in back yards." In addition, Goode and Chaiklin insisted that Baskin "wasn't coerced" into answering questions about her former husband.

In February 2021, Baskin revealed that she had been asked to be interviewed for the second season of the show, but she refused and told the producers to "lose her number".

On November 1, 2021, Baskin and her husband Howard filed a lawsuit against Netflix and Royal Goode Productions over an alleged breach of contract. They claim that their initial release did not grant the producers liberty to produce derivative works or sequels using the original footage shot of Carol and Howard. The lawsuit requested an injunction to stop the release of the series on November 17. On November 5, a federal judge denied Baskin's motion for a temporary restraining order that would block Netflix and Royal Goode Productions from using footage of her, her husband, and their Big Cat Rescue sanctuary in Season 2 of Tiger King. The judge ruled that the Baskins "are not entitled to the extraordinary remedy of a temporary restraining order, which would be entered before Defendants have had an adequate opportunity to respond." The judge further added that the case would not necessarily entitle the Baskins to financial compensation. The Federal Court in Tampa Bay also denied a preliminary injunction on November 15, 2021, just two days before the shows' premiere, after defense attorneys for Netflix said a delay would "hurt marketing momentum" and violate the First Amendment, which in this case would fall under freedom of the press.

==== Doc Antle ====
Doc Antle was disappointed with his portrayal in the first season, calling it a "train wreck of entertainment" and "salacious." Antle said in an interview that he was not told that the first season would be about the bitter feud between Baskin and Exotic, and said that he would've preferred to be "left out of it";

This is not a documentary. This is a salacious, outrageous ride through a television show produced to create drama, to just tie you in to some crazy train wreck of a story between the feud of Carole Baskin and Joe Exotic. Questions about Carole and Joe were a dozen or so thrown into hundreds of others. And I repeatedly told them, I have no desire to be involved in some show where you got the feud of Carole and Joe going on. It's not my thing. Leave me out of it.

==== Kelci "Saff" Saffery ====
Following the release of the Netflix series, Robert Moor, the creator of an earlier podcast about Joe Exotic, posted a tweet stating "Saff, the person who got mauled by the tiger, told me repeatedly that he is trans, prefers to be called Saff, and uses he/him pronouns. So please do likewise." Media outlets criticized the series for misgendering and deadnaming Saffery by his birth name. LGBTQ Nation contrasted Netflix's treatment of Saffery with their recent collaboration with GLAAD, an LGBTQ media watchdog group, on a campaign raising "transgender visibility in the entertainment industry". Saffery clarified to Esquire,

On a daily basis, I am called 17 different things. I never really took it to heart. [...] [F]or context, my conversation with Rob was that he asked me, 'What do you prefer? Saff or Kelci?' And of course, I said Saff because that's what I've been called for the past 20 years. I was in the Army prior to the park and they always use last names. So, Saff was my preferred name. And I've always gone by him since I could say that out loud. My family was always very supportive—it was never an issue.

Regarding whether he identified as a trans man, Saffery stated to Out magazine, "No, I, I can honestly say no. I don't know that that describes me. You know, nothing was done. I really just have lived this lifestyle. And, you know, my family knows this. And obviously, people closest to me know. This is how I've lived my entire life. I don't know anything else."

== Subsequent media ==
On April 8, 2020, Deadline Hollywood reported that Ryan Murphy is in talks to produce a film or limited series for Netflix with Rob Lowe starring as Joe Exotic.

On April 14, 2020, TMZ released the special Tiger King: What Really Went Down?, which featured footage unseen in the first season of Tiger King.

On May 4, 2020, Variety reported that Nicolas Cage had been cast to portray Exotic in an eight-episode television series based on a Texas Monthly article about Exotic. The series is produced by Imagine Entertainment and CBS Television Studios, and Dan Lagana will serve as writer, showrunner, and executive producer. In September 2020, it was announced that the series had officially been picked up for development at Amazon Prime Video. In July 2021, it was announced that Amazon had shelved the project.

A limited series titled Joe Exotic: Tigers, Lies and Cover-Up premiered on September 27, 2020, on Investigation Discovery. A TV special titled Joe Exotic: Before He Was King premiered on September 28, 2020.

Tiger Queens: The Tiger King Musical was a Netflix musical based on Tiger King, which debuted on TikTok on March 28, 2021. The production featured former RuPaul's Drag Race contestants Kim Chi, Willam, and Heidi N Closet portraying Baskin, Joe Exotic, and a tiger, respectively.

On April 5, 2021, British documentary filmmaker Louis Theroux released a new documentary on Exotic, titled Shooting Joe Exotic, on BBC Two in the United Kingdom. The documentary contained unseen footage of Exotic from a previous documentary by Theroux, America's Most Dangerous Pets (2011), as well as new interviews of other people associated with Exotic, including Exotic's legal team, his estranged brother and niece, and the Baskins.

A limited series adaptation headed by Universal Content Productions, is based on a podcast Joe Exotic: Tiger King by Robert Moor, with Kate McKinnon as executive producer and starring as Carole Baskin. Originally to air on NBC, Peacock, and USA Network, it was announced in May 2021 that the series would be streaming exclusively on Peacock. Titled Joe vs. Carole, it premiered on March 3, 2022.

== See also ==
- List of Tiger King subjects
