= Big Cat Rescue =

American non-profit organization

Big Cat Rescue Corp.
- Nickname: BCR, Big Cat Rescue
- Formation: March 30, 1995; 31 years ago as Wildlife on Easy Street, Inc.
- Founders: Don Lewis; Carole Baskin
- Type: 501(c)(3) organization
- Tax ID no.: 59-3330495
- Locations: 12802 Easy St, Tampa, FL 33625; Hillsborough County, Florida, U.S.
- Coordinates: 28.060314°N 82.571559°W
- Fields: Protection of endangered species, wildlife sanctuary/refuge, education
- CEO: Carole Baskin
- President: Jamie Murdock
- Secretary/Treasurer: Howard Baskin
- Revenue: $4,429,347 (2018)
- Expenses: $3,201,985 (2018)
- Staff: 20 (2018)
- Volunteers: 126 (2018)
- Website: bigcatrescue.org
- Formerly called: Wildlife on Easy Street, Inc.

Big Cat Rescue Corp., also known as BCR and previously known as Wildlife on Easy Street, Inc., is an American non-profit organization that operated an animal sanctuary in Hillsborough County, Florida, United States, which rescued and housed exotic cats, and rehabilitated injured or orphaned native wild cats. It was founded by Don Lewis and Carole Baskin in 1995.

The animal sanctuary was open to the public and BCR sold tickets to visitors for tours including private tours, night tours, and feeding tours. On March 16, 2020, BCR closed the facility to the public due to the COVID-19 outbreak, and Baskin later announced that she was considering not reopening the animal sanctuary to the public.

In 2019, BCR had 51 animals—17 big cats and 34 small cats of 11 species, including bobcats, Canada lynxes, caracals, cougars, Eurasian lynxes, jaguars, leopards, lions, ocelots, servals and tigers — down from 66 in 2018.

BCR had been accredited by Global Federation of Animal Sanctuaries in 2009 and throughout the following decade, and had received 4-star ratings from Charity Navigator for 2007–2022.

== History ==
In 1992, Don Lewis and Carole Lewis (now known as Carole Baskin) acquired a bobcat. The following year they acquired dozens more. In 1995, they incorporated Wildlife on Easy Street, Inc. in Florida as a Not For Profit Corporation with the stated purpose of "acquisition, shelter, feeding, breeding and socialization of exotic and non-exotic animals; public education and awareness to benefit their wild counterparts." In 2003, Wildlife on Easy Street, Inc. was dissolved in a merger into a newly incorporated nonprofit, Big Cat Rescue Corp., with the stated purpose "Prevention of cruelty to animals by providing rescue and a permanent retirement home to exotic cats".

The sanctuary featured a bed and breakfast experience that allowed guests to spend the night with a young wild cat in their cabin. According to the sanctuary, this part of its history was a misguided effort to aid captive conservation and animal welfare of privately owned animals. The sanctuary was accredited by The Association of Sanctuaries in 1998, and its successor, the Global Federation of Animal Sanctuaries since 2007 to present.

In September 2000, Wildlife on Easy Street applied to the Association of Zoos and Aquariums for accreditation as a Certified Related Facility. The application was denied in March 2001 for various reasons, including concerns about the amount of visitor contact with the cats, lack of any trained zoological professionals on staff, insufficient formal veterinary programs and unfinished perimeter fencing. BCR ceased physical encounters of any kind between the public and cats housed there in 2003.

In 2013, following a 2011 lawsuit, Joseph Maldonado-Passage, aka "Joe Exotic", whose family runs the GW Exotic Animal Park, was ordered to pay Big Cat Rescue $1 million for using confusingly similar trademarked materials. Joe Exotic attempted to hire a hitman to kill Carole Baskin, chief executive officer of Big Cat Rescue, who had won a lawsuit against him in 2013. Maldonado-Passage has since been arrested and convicted of two counts of murder-for-hire, eight violations of the Lacey Act and nine of the Endangered Species Act.

In October 2014, Florida Fish and Wildlife Conservation Commission inspected BCR based on a complaint and issued a warning for "maintaining a Leopard in an uncovered outdoor cage >1000 sq. ft., without the use of a moat system, and without previously obtaining written approval by the Commission".

In March 2019, Big Cat Rescue opened a zoo exhibit without live animals, using augmented reality and virtual reality technologies. Visitors come in person and access the exhibit through a mobile app on their cell phone.

In March 2020, Big Cat Rescue temporarily closed to the public due to the COVID-19 pandemic in Florida., and Baskin later announced in a Facebook post that she was considering not opening it to the public, stating;

There is just too much opportunity for people to put their own desires ahead of the greater good. We are trying to find ways that the cats can be cared for in a post-COVID-19 world.

Prior to December 2023, all of the cats had been permanently relocated to Turpentine Creek Wildlife Refuge (TCWR) in Eureka Springs, Arkansas. In December 2024, Big Cat Rescue sold the Florida land for USD$19.5 million, of which they claimed would be used to help pay for the food at TCWR and to donate to projects working to save cat species in the wild.

== Conservation ==
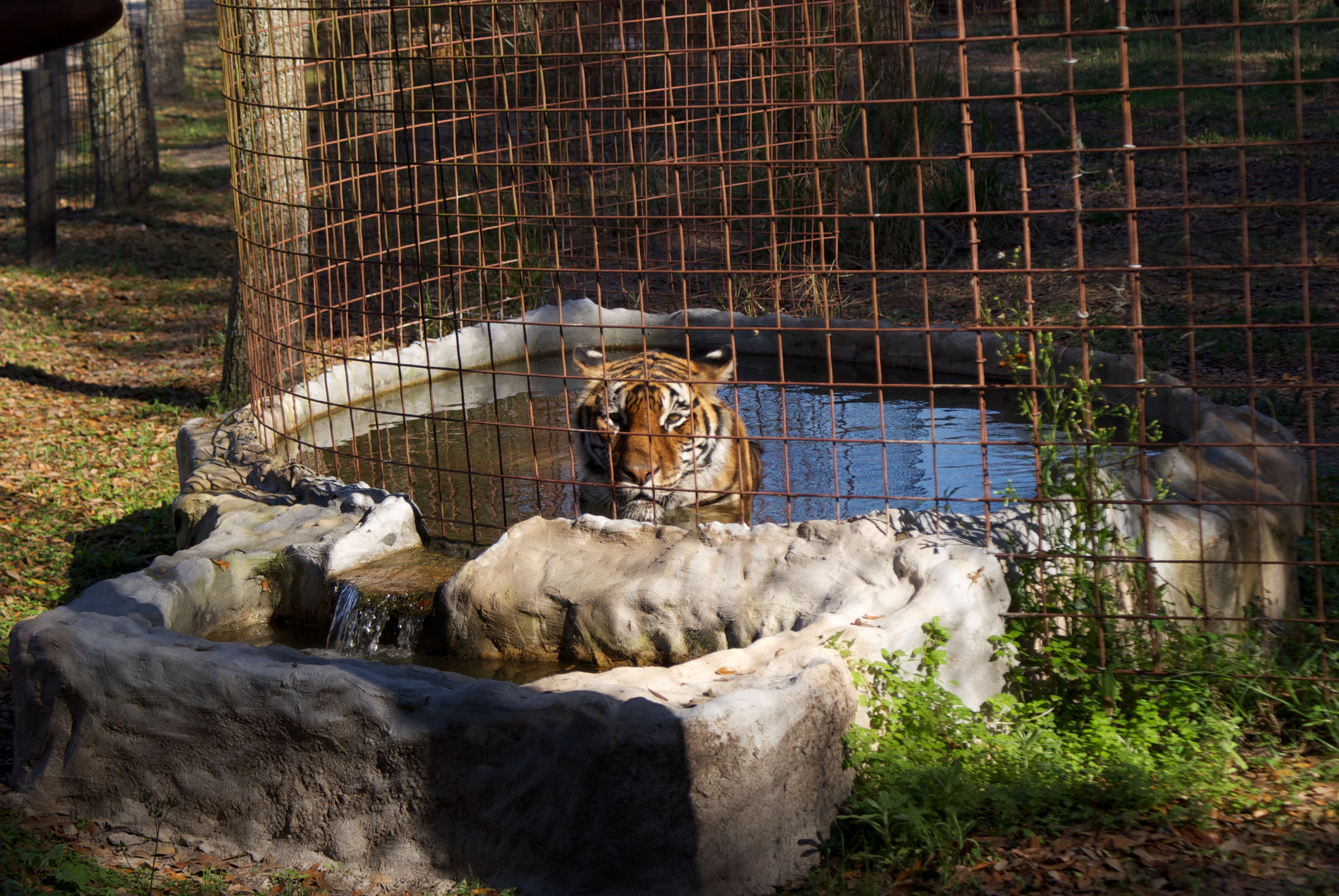
Tiger at Big Cat Rescue in 2012

One of the stated main goals of Big Cat Rescue is to end ownership and trade of exotic felines in the private sector entirely. Big Cat Rescue claims that permit systems are not effective at ensuring animal welfare and campaigns for a total ban of private ownership of big cats regardless of keeping conditions. The center is part of the International Tiger Coalition, which is dedicated to stopping the trade of tiger parts.

In 2005, Big Cat Rescue published an action plan to end all captive keeping of all exotic cats, including animals in AZA-accredited zoos bred for conservation. According to the plan, Big Cat Rescue wanted interstate transport of big cats for any reason (including conservation breeding programs) to end by 2012, display of large exotic cats in zoos to end by 2013 and keeping of any exotic cats (including smaller species) in zoos to be discontinued by 2015.

In 2015, Big Cat Rescue began campaigning for the passage of a bill in the United States Congress called The Big Cat Public Safety Act (H.R. 3546) that would ban all future keeping of all large cat species in the United States, with zoos certified by the Association of Zoos and Aquariums, as well as certain sanctuaries, universities, wildlife rehabilitators, and traveling circuses being exempt. In 2019 the Big Cat Public Safety Act was revised to end cub handling, the primary cause of abuse and phase out private ownership of big cats, while allowing possession by USDA licensees. As of January 2020, HR1380 had 227 co-sponsors in the House and the companion bill, S2561 has 17 co-sponsors in the Senate. The House approved the bill in December 2020 but it did not proceed to a floor vote in the Senate; however, in April 2021, sponsoring senator Richard Blumenthal indicated that additional Republican support for the legislation had been secured and that the bill would be reintroduced. The bill passed both houses and was signed by President Biden on December 20, 2022.

=== Rescue of Skip ===
In January 2011, the center received attention for its rescue of "Skip", a bobcat, who had likely been hit by a car on Florida State Road 46 and had a crushed pelvis. Fans of Skip who watched his recovery on Ustream organized on Facebook, calling themselves "Skipaholics". These fans contributed money for cameras, cat beds, and other equipment, but Skip died in September 2012.

== Animals ==
List of animals

=== Mammals ===
- Bengal tiger
- Bobcat
- Canada lynx
- Caracal
- Jaguar
- Serval
- African Lion
- African Leopard
- Snow leopard
- Florida panther
- Cougar
- Puma
- Mountain lion

== In popular culture ==
The 2020 Netflix original documentary series Tiger King: Murder, Mayhem and Madness is centered around big cat breeder Joe Exotic, who was convicted for a murder-for-hire targeting Carole Baskin and killing five tigers. Big Cat Rescue and Baskin appear in every episode save the aftershow.

The sanctuary's owner, Carole Baskin, has voiced her displeasure with the show, stating that "it was like watching a dumpster fire, you just couldn’t turn away from it", and explained that her rivalry with Joe Exotic was somewhat blown out of proportion, as she claimed to have never actually spoken with him. Despite this, the show became wildly popular, reaching 34 million views in only ten days.

== See also ==
- International Big Cat Alliance
