= International Tiger Coalition =

International Tiger Coalition logo

International Tiger Coalition is an alliance of over forty non-governmental organizations representing over one hundred international organizations dedicated to stopping the trade of tiger parts from all sources, including those from tiger farms.

== International Tiger Coalition members ==
- American College of Traditional Chinese Medicine
- AMUR
- Animal Welfare Institute
- Animals Asia Foundation
- Association of Zoos & Aquariums
- Big Cat Rescue
- Born Free Foundation
- Born Free USA
- British and Irish Association of Zoos & Aquariums
- Care for the Wild International
- Conservation International
- Council of Colleges of Acupuncture and Oriental Medicine
- David Shepherd Wildlife Foundation
- Education for Nature Vietnam
- Environmental Investigation Agency
- Freeland Foundation
- Global Tiger Patrol
- Humane Society International
- Humane Society of the United States
- International Fund for Animal Welfare
- Phoenix Fund
- ProFauna Indonesia
- Save The Tiger Fund (merged with Panthera in 2011)
- Species Survival Network
- The Fund For The Tiger
- Tigris Foundation
- Tour Operators for Tigers
- TRAFFIC
- WildCats Conservation Alliance
- WildAid
- WildCat Conservation Legal Aid Society
- Wildlife Alliance
- Wildlife Conservation Nepal
- Wildlife Conservation Society
- Wildlife Trust of India
- Wildlife Watch Group
- World Association of Zoos & Aquariums
- World Society for the Protection of Animals
- World Wildlife Fund
- Zoological Society of London
