= Greater Wynnewood Exotic Animal Park =

Animal park in Oklahoma, United States

- Interactive map of Greater Wynnewood Exotic Animal Park
- 34°37′32″N 97°12′40″W
- Date opened: 1999
- Date closed: August 18, 2020
- Location: Wynnewood, Oklahoma, U.S.
- Land area: 16 acres (6.5 ha)
- No. of animals: 700
- No. of species: 50
- Owner: Joe Exotic (1999–2018); Jeff Lowe (2018–2020)
- Website: https://www.wynnewoodzoo.org/

The Greater Wynnewood Exotic Animal Park, alternatively known as the G.W. Zoo, Tiger King Park and formerly the Garold Wayne Exotic Animal Memorial Park, was an animal park displaying predominantly tigers and other big cats in Wynnewood, Oklahoma, United States. The park garnered substantial public attention due to the 2020 Netflix documentary series Tiger King: Murder, Mayhem and Madness, which focused on park founder and owner Joe Exotic.

== History ==
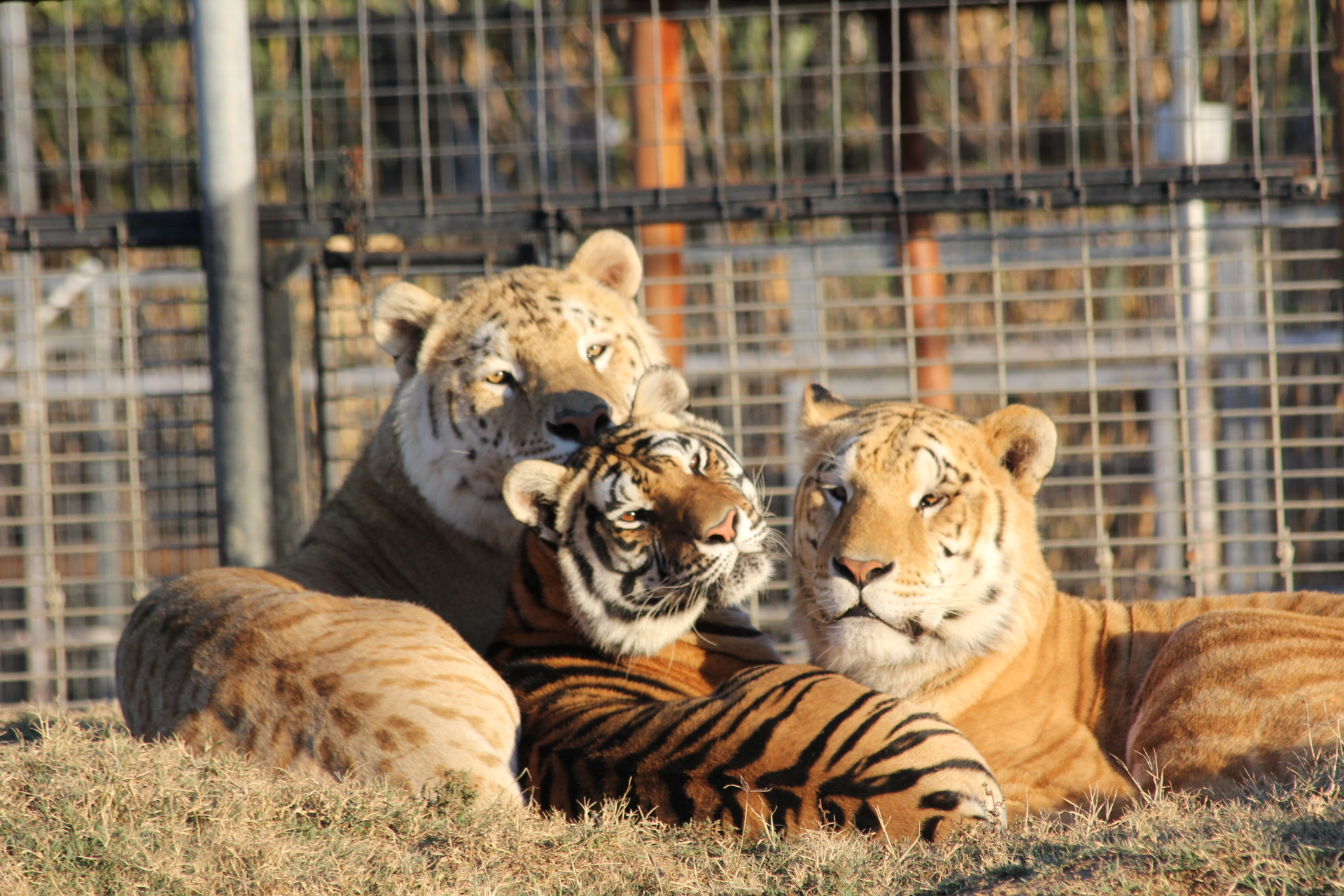
Taliger at the G. W. Zoo, pictured in 2013

Situated on 16 acres (6.5 ha), the Greater Wynnewood Exotic Animal Park began as a shelter for endangered and exotic species of animals, and was home to over fifty species of animals and 200 big cats, such as tigers, lions, pumas, ligers and tigons. It was originally established as the Garold Wayne Exotic Animal Memorial Park in 1999 by Joe Exotic and dedicated to the memory of his brother, Garold Wayne Schreibvogel, who had died in a car crash in 1997. The park was known by multiple names over the years, including the G.W. Exotic Animal Memorial Foundation and the Garold Wayne Interactive Zoological Foundation.

In 2010, G.W. Exotic Animal Memorial Foundation created Big Cat Rescue Entertainment Group, Inc. Big Cat Rescue Corp., an animal sanctuary based in Tampa, Florida, filed suit against them, claiming the name and logo similarities were used to damage their reputation and cause confusion; the Tampa sanctuary's founder, Carole Baskin, had previously been a critic of the practices at Joe Exotic's park. The defendants counter-claimed, stating that Big Cat Rescue had caused them financial loss. In February 2013, a judge rejected the counter-claim and Exotic agreed to a consent decree of approximately US$1 million. The park filed for bankruptcy and remained open to the public. A new park, The Garold Wayne Interactive Zoological Foundation, was incorporated shortly after the suit. The entity G.W. Exotic Animal Memorial Foundation was dissolved and its assets, but not liabilities, were transferred to The Garold Wayne Interactive Zoological Foundation. Big Cat Rescue again filed suit on the premise that the new park was a successor to the first park and had the same personnel, income, assets, property, and overall business. In 2016, The Garold Wayne Interactive Zoological Foundation was determined liable and ordered to pay US$1,028,000 and interest.

In 2011, the park was issued a rendering facility license by the State of Oklahoma.

In 2016, Jeff Lowe purchased the park from Exotic, but left him in charge of daily operations. Lowe, a businessman, had previously been convicted of mail fraud, and had run afoul of local authorities in Beaufort, South Carolina, in 2015 for exhibiting big cats at his liquidation store without appropriate permits.

Lowe increased the zoo's menagerie from 29 animals in 2017 to 212 in 2020, United States Department of Agriculture (USDA) records show; the zoo then had bears, lemurs and monkeys in addition to exotic cats. In 2019, Lowe announced plans to close the park and move the animals to a new location near Thackerville, Oklahoma.

The Wynnewood park was renamed "Tiger King Park" and was reopened in early May 2020 after a brief closure during the COVID-19 pandemic.

In May 2020, federal judge Scott Palk of the Western District Court of Oklahoma gave ownership of the park to Baskin after ruling that Exotic fraudulently transferred ownership to his mother to avoid paying debts incurred as a result of Baskin's suit. The judge ordered Lowe to vacate the park within 120 days and remove all animals. In June, the USDA found that many animals at the park were suffering from flystrike, and on August 17, the agency suspended Lowe's exhibitor's license for 21 days, alleging poor veterinary care. Citing the incipient transfer of ownership, Lowe permanently shut down the park on August 18 rather than contesting the suspension.

After Lowe's departure, Baskin decided to sell the property with deed restrictions prohibiting the keeping of exotic animals. Baskin found the park to be heavily vandalized with rotting meat and graffiti referencing the disappearance of Don Lewis; Lowe denied responsibility for the damage. Lowe relocated the animals to the Thackerville property, intending to open a new park there, but the U.S. Justice Department filed a lawsuit citing Lowe's history of poor animal care; the park never opened and federal authorities seized all 68 cats in May 2021.

As of early 2026, most aspects of the park, including its entry sign and any reference to exotic animals, have been removed, with additional fencing and a security presence in place to deter vandals and trespassers. A trailer park currently sits on the site.

== Controversies ==
Between February and June 2006, People for the Ethical Treatment of Animals (PETA), an animal rights organization, investigated the park by having someone work at the park as an employee and obtain video footage of the animals and conditions, which PETA published. PETA alleged that animals were starved and "routinely hit, punched, kicked, sprayed with cold water, and struck with rakes and shovels." In 2011, the park's director filed a police report alleging that the employee illegally obtained access to the director's computer and copied files.

In 2012, the Humane Society of the United States (HSUS) released a report from an undercover investigation. HSUS claimed that five tigers died during the period of their investigation, one of which did not receive veterinary care.

In May 2014, the USDA cited the park for failure to provide adequate veterinary care. According to officials, an injured bear's wound reopened after a stitching, and an employee attempted to re-stitch it. The injury subsequently worsened and the bear was euthanized.

Large animals, including horses, were sometimes donated to the park and would be killed to feed the big cats.

On October 6, 2017, Joe Exotic's husband, Travis Maldonado, fatally shot himself in the head. The shooting occurred in the business office while the park was open. The Garvin County Sheriff ruled that the shooting was accidental.

In September 2018, Exotic was indicted by a federal grand jury, and arrested by the FBI, for attempting to hire a hitman to murder Carole Baskin. On April 2, 2019, following a jury trial in the U.S. District Court for the Western District of Oklahoma, Exotic was convicted of 19 counts: two counts of murder-for-hire, eight violations of the Lacey Act and nine of the Endangered Species Act. On January 22, 2020, he was sentenced to 22 years in federal prison.

Between 2017 and the closure of the park in August 2020, Lowe was under investigation by the USDA for failure to provide adequate veterinary care and ensure adequate separation between animals and visitors. The USDA also alleged that Lowe submitted falsified veterinary records to the agency indicating approval by the park's staff veterinarian after she had resigned in 2018. By mid-2020, the Garvin County Sheriff was also conducting several investigations into allegations of animal abuse, unlawful disposal of animal carcasses, and environmental violations at the park.

In December 2019, the Oklahoma Tax Commission placed a tax lien against the park property for unpaid sales taxes from 2016, and denied the park's tax permit renewal in May 2020. A park employee alleged that Lowe had ceased sales tax payments soon after taking over the park in 2016 and had continued operations later in 2020 without a valid tax permit. In June, the Tax Commission initiated a lawsuit against the park in the Garvin County District Court, claiming that Lowe owed $50,274 in delinquent sales tax from prior years. In September after the park's permanent closure, Lowe settled the case, agreeing to pay up to $113,653 in restitution.

== Documentaries ==
The park features heavily in a 2011 documentary, Louis Theroux: America's Most Dangerous Pets.

The 2020 Netflix original documentary series Tiger King: Murder, Mayhem and Madness was centered on Joe Exotic. The park received thousands of visitors following the release of the documentary. However, Oklahoma Governor Kevin Stitt required that all non-essential businesses close because of the COVID-19 pandemic. On March 31, 2020, the Garvin County, Oklahoma sheriff said the park had closed to visitors in compliance with the governor's order to shut down nonessential business. The park reopened the first weekend in May after the restrictions were relaxed.

Later in 2020, after hearing the rumors of paranormal activity at the park in the Netflix documentary, the crew of Ghost Adventures investigated here for their Halloween special.

In the documentary Louis Theroux: Shooting Joe Exotic, released in April 2021, documentarian Louis Theroux is given a tour of the vacant and heavily vandalized park by Carole Baskin and her husband Howard Baskin.
