= Turpentine Creek Wildlife Refuge =

Wildlife refuge in Arkansas, US

Coordinates: 36°18′38″N 93°45′26″W

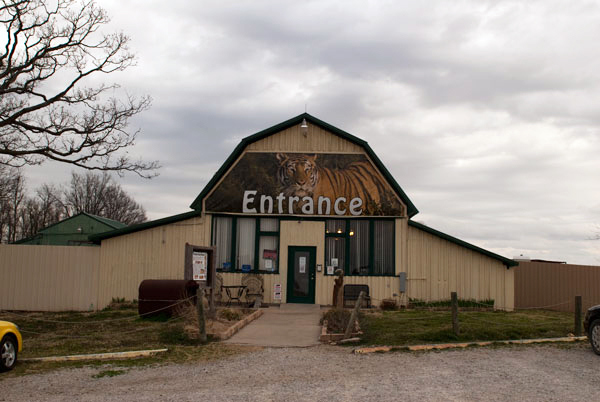
- View of the entrance prior to the remodel and expansion of the refuge
- Formation: 1992
- Headquarters: Eureka Springs
- Website: https://www.turpentinecreek.org/

Turpentine Creek Wildlife Refuge (TCWR) is a 459-acre (186 ha) wildlife refuge for abused, abandoned, and neglected big cats.

The Eureka Springs, Arkansas, refuge houses 100 or more animals. The sanctuary primarily focuses on the care of tigers, but it also provides a home for a diverse range of other animals including lions, hybrids like ligers, cougars, servals, bobcats, bears, jaguars, leopards, hyenas, and caracals.

Turpentine Creek is a member of the American Association of Zoo Keepers, and in 2014, it achieved Verified Status from the Global Federation of Animal Sanctuaries.

== Expansion ==
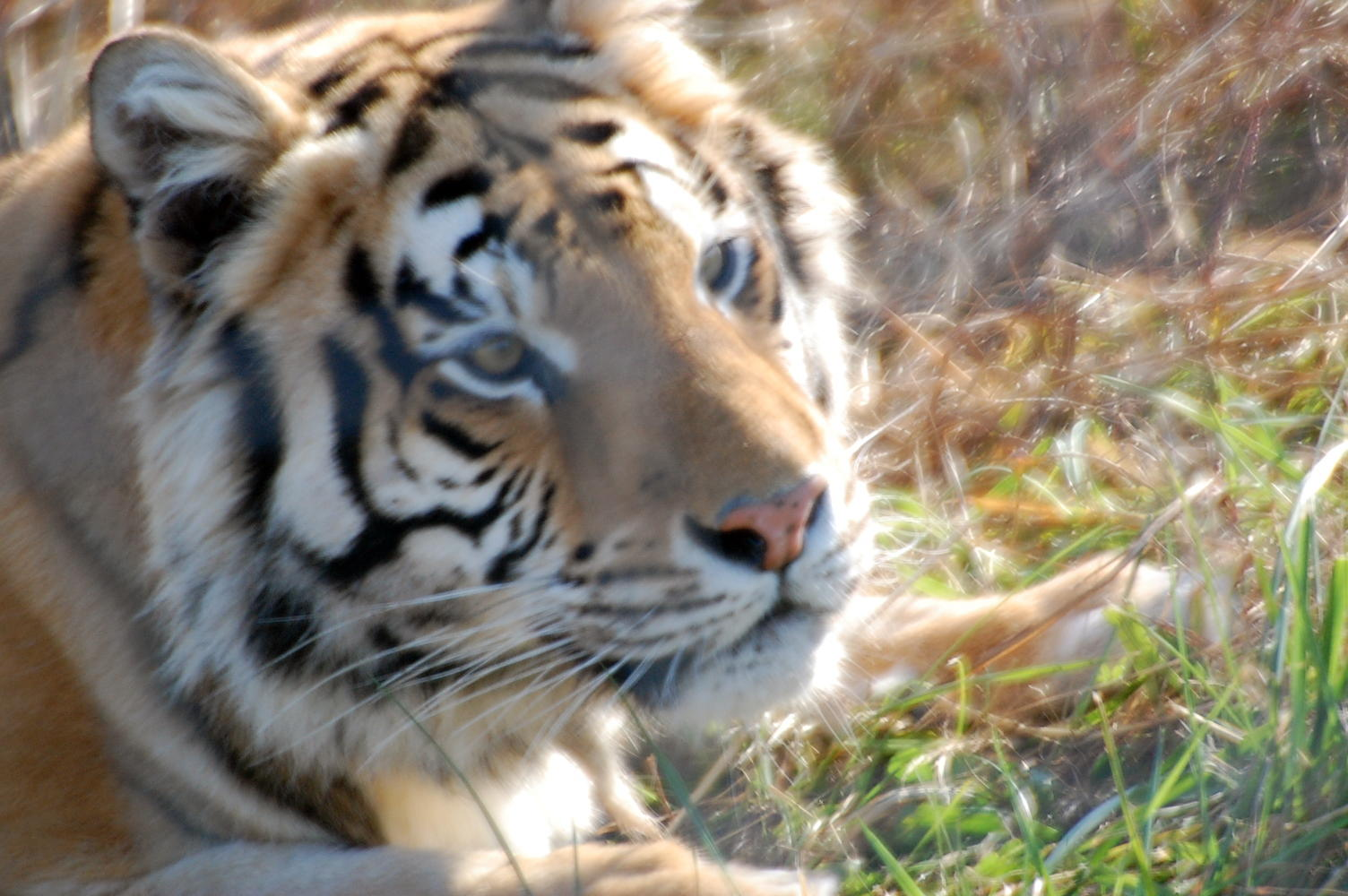
Tiger in a field at the refuge

In 2012 Turpentine Creek rescued 34 big cats from a breeding facility. To accommodate this massive number of cats a secondary area was built, which is now referred to as "Rescue Ridge". Many of the cats rescued from the facility were not used to human contact. To reduce stress on the animals this area is not open to the public.

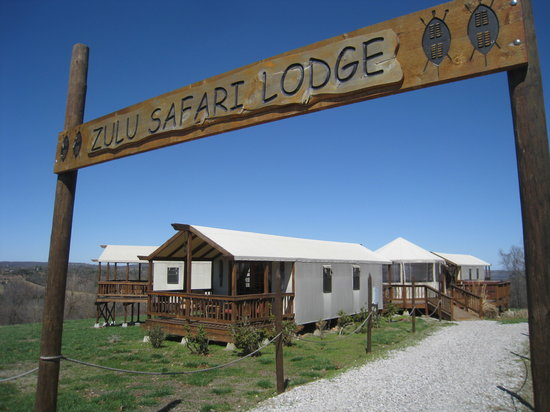
Safari lodging

At one point, the refuge was expanded. The original area, now referred to as the "Compound" that contained smaller cages with cement flooring has been emptied. Turpentine built grassy habitats ranging in size from 1/4 acre to 1/2 acre for the animals to live in.

By September 16, 2015, all of the small concrete cages that used to make up the majority of Turpentine Creek were emptied. On September 17, 2015, demolition of the old "compound" area began.

Turpentine Creek has an on-site veterinary hospital for the animals who reside there. The vet hospital is on Turpentine Creek's property and makes giving the animals medical attention easier. Having a vet hospital on-site causes less stress to the animals and reduces the risk of the animals, or any human around them, getting injured.
