= Disappearance of Don Lewis =

American disappearance case

Don Lewis
- Photo of Don Lewis provided by the Hillsborough County Sheriff during his investigation into Lewis's disappearance
- Born: Jack Donald Lewis; April 30, 1938; Dade City, Florida, U.S.
- Disappeared: August 18, 1997 (aged 59); Tampa, Florida, U.S.
- Status: Declared dead in absentia on August 19, 2002 (aged 64)
- Other name: Bob Martinez
- Spouses: Gladys Lewis Cross (div. 1990); Carole Baskin (m. 1991)
- Children: 4

Jack Donald Lewis (born April 30, 1938) is an American missing person who disappeared on the morning of August 18, 1997, after leaving his home in Tampa, Florida. The investigation into his disappearance has stretched from Lewis's Wildlife on Easy Street sanctuary in Tampa, co-owned with his second wife Carole Baskin, to land owned by Lewis in Costa Rica. No evidence has surfaced that Lewis was the victim of a crime, but friends, family, and investigators believe it is unlikely that he disappeared by choice because he had been executing business plans that were left unfinished. Lewis left behind over US$5 million in assets (equivalent to over $10 million in 2025). He was declared legally dead in 2002 on the fifth anniversary of his disappearance.

Lewis's disappearance was covered in the crime documentary series Tiger King, which focused on a feud between Baskin and Oklahoma-based private zoo owner Joe Exotic. The Hillsborough County Sheriff's Office has used the popularity of Tiger King to help investigate the disappearance.

== Background ==
Don Lewis was a native of Dade City, Florida. By 1981, Lewis had trucking, real estate and used car businesses. He married his first wife, Gladys Lewis Cross, and had three daughters and an adopted son.

In January 1981, Lewis met Carole Murdock (née Stairs) on Hillsborough Avenue near 50th Street in Tampa, after she fled her house after an attack by her abusive first husband, Michael Murdock. Carole Murdock and Lewis began an affair although both were still married. She became one of his many girlfriends and substantially grew his wealth by helping him buy and sell real estate in 1984. Lewis and Murdock divorced their spouses and married in 1991. The following year, the couple co-founded Wildlife on Easy Street (now called Big Cat Rescue), an animal sanctuary for big cats in Tampa. The two clashed over how to run the sanctuary; he wanted to breed the cats and operate it as a business while she wanted it to be a non-profit charity.

According to Murdock, who remarried in 2004 and took the name Baskin, Lewis was obsessed with sex and would frequently fly to Costa Rica to engage in affairs – especially when she was menstruating. According to family members, Lewis would sometimes travel there without telling anyone in advance, but would always call someone promptly after arrival so his family would know where he was. He told family members and friends that he was planning to move there permanently. In early 1997, he began transferring ownership of his properties in Florida to a Costa Rican company he controlled. In the days leading up to his disappearance, he bought a plane ticket to Costa Rica and loaded equipment onto a truck he planned to drive to Miami.

Baskin has said that Lewis's mental health had been deteriorating, and he had begun rummaging in dumpsters and hoarding vehicles and junk. She said he was losing his short-term memory and was sometimes disoriented, and she suspected he was developing Alzheimer's disease. Lewis's former personal attorney and a former business associate have disputed this characterization. In July 1997, Lewis filed for a restraining order against Baskin, claiming she threatened to kill him and hid his gun to prevent him from protecting himself; the request was rejected. Baskin said he filed the request in retaliation for her hauling away some of his junk while he was in Costa Rica. Lewis continued to live with her afterwards, despite having sought the restraining order. Lewis told her multiple times that he wanted a divorce, but she says she thought he was not being serious.

== Investigation ==
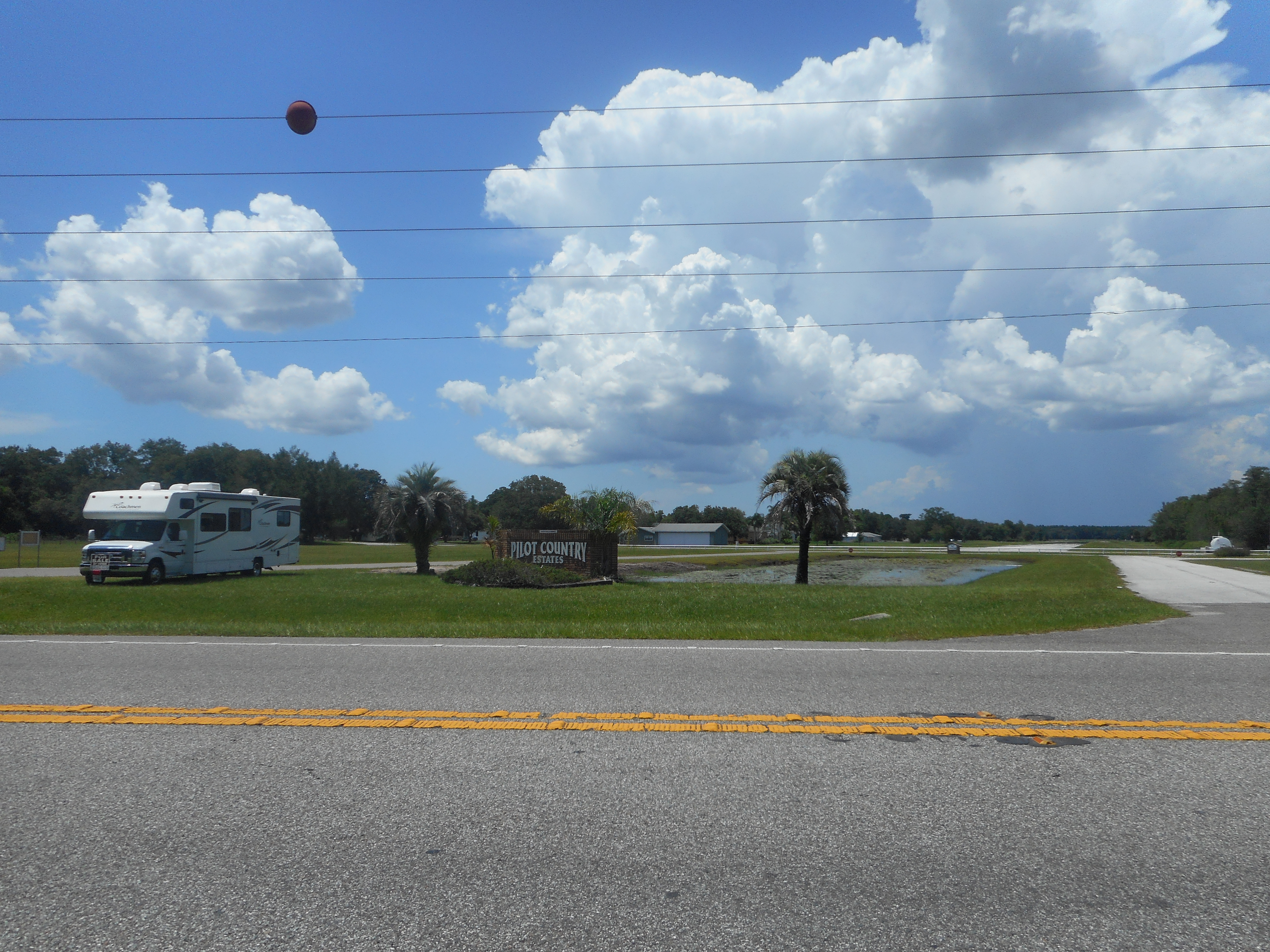
Lewis's van was found at the Pilot Country Airport (2016 photo with unrelated vehicle).

Lewis disappeared on August 18, 1997, after leaving his home and making an early-morning delivery around 6:00 a.m. On August 20, his white 1989 Dodge Ram Van was found at the Pilot Country Airport in Spring Hill, Florida, 40 miles (64 km) away from the sanctuary. At the time of his disappearance, Lewis owned several planes and was known to sometimes fly them even though his private pilot license was suspended. The airport manager said the van had not been moved for a couple of days, and sheriff's deputies found its keys in the floorboard but found no other evidence inside.

The Hillsborough County Sheriff's Office "found no sign of foul play" at the Tampa sanctuary and visited the Costa Rican town of Bagaces, where Lewis owned a 200-acre (81-hectare) park, as part of their investigation. The investigation in Costa Rica lasted five days. In Costa Rica, investigators found indications that Lewis engaged in extramarital affairs and questionable business practices. They also found that two of Lewis's ocelots had recently been shipped out, but their whereabouts were unknown. None of Lewis's credit cards have been used since his disappearance.

Lewis left behind holdings estimated at more than US$5 million, leading to a legal dispute between Baskin and Lewis's children. Lewis was declared legally dead in 2002. Most of his estate was left to Baskin. In 2004, Baskin refused to take a polygraph related to the investigation, as advised by her attorney. Lewis's children have volunteered to take polygraphs. By 2005, authorities leaned away from the theory that Lewis disappeared on his own. No one has ever been arrested or charged with a crime in relation to the case.

Lewis's longtime business manager says that Baskin accused her of involvement in the disappearance because she had recently transferred some of Lewis's property to her own name and obtained a life insurance policy for Lewis naming herself as a beneficiary. In a statement to The Tampa Bay Times, the manager said that she had done so under Lewis's specific instructions, that the insurance policy had several additional beneficiaries, and that she had also helped him transfer property to others.

In March 2020, using the popularity of the Netflix documentary series Tiger King, Hillsborough County Sheriff Chad Chronister appealed to the public for legitimate leads or evidence for the case. In the following week, the Sheriff's Office received about six tips a day related to Lewis's disappearance but "none credible". Chronister expressed his belief that a former employee of Wildlife on Easy Street that had a sour relationship with either Lewis or Baskin will step forward with evidence. Chronister reiterated that his department does not "have any type of evidence, not one piece, that suggests that [Lewis] was killed" or that a crime was even committed. He also stated his opinion that Tiger King was spun for entertainment.

== Unofficial hypotheses ==
In December 1998, Pam Lambert of People magazine wrote that there was "a wealth of suspects and scenarios, but precious little evidence" in Lewis's disappearance. Both seasons of Tiger King covered multiple theories surrounding the disappearance. In the first season, Lewis's children pushed a theory that Baskin fed Lewis to the tigers at the sanctuary, and criticized investigators for not running a DNA test on a meat grinder on the property. However, the meat grinder was removed from the sanctuary weeks before Lewis's disappearance. Baskin reacted to the allegations, saying that there would be human bones as remains if the tigers had eaten Lewis. Baskin expressed her frustration about the theories to Lambert, saying: "Can you imagine having people think you killed your husband or wife and not being able to prove otherwise? Without a body, there is nothing I can do to clear my name."

Baskin has had a long-running feud with Joe Exotic, the former owner of the Greater Wynnewood Exotic Animal Park in Wynnewood, Oklahoma. Exotic has promoted an unproven theory that Baskin was involved in the disappearance of Lewis. He created a music video entitled "Here Kitty Kitty" that featured a Baskin-lookalike feeding raw meat to tigers. Exotic has also promoted an alternative theory that Lewis is buried in a septic tank at Baskin's sanctuary, but a septic tank was not installed on the property until years after Lewis's disappearance. Other unofficial theories covered by Tiger King include Lewis flying to Costa Rica and living under a new identity, or that his plane crashed on the way to Costa Rica. After the first season of Tiger King was released, several Internet memes targeted Baskin for her speculated involvement in Lewis's disappearance.

In the second season of Tiger King, attorney Joseph Fritz produced a letter that purported to originate from the United States Department of Homeland Security, stating that Don Lewis was alive and well in Costa Rica. Baskin later said during an interview on British talk show This Morning that the revelation of her husband's supposed whereabouts was "really exciting". Baskin's comments received renewed attention in January 2023 when articles in Cosmopolitan and the New York Post alleged that Lewis was "found alive" in Costa Rica, relying on Baskin's comments as proof. According to Snopes, claims that Lewis is alive in Costa Rica are "unproven".

== See also ==
- List of people who disappeared mysteriously (1990s)
