= Doc Antle =

American wildlife trainer

Bhagavan Antle
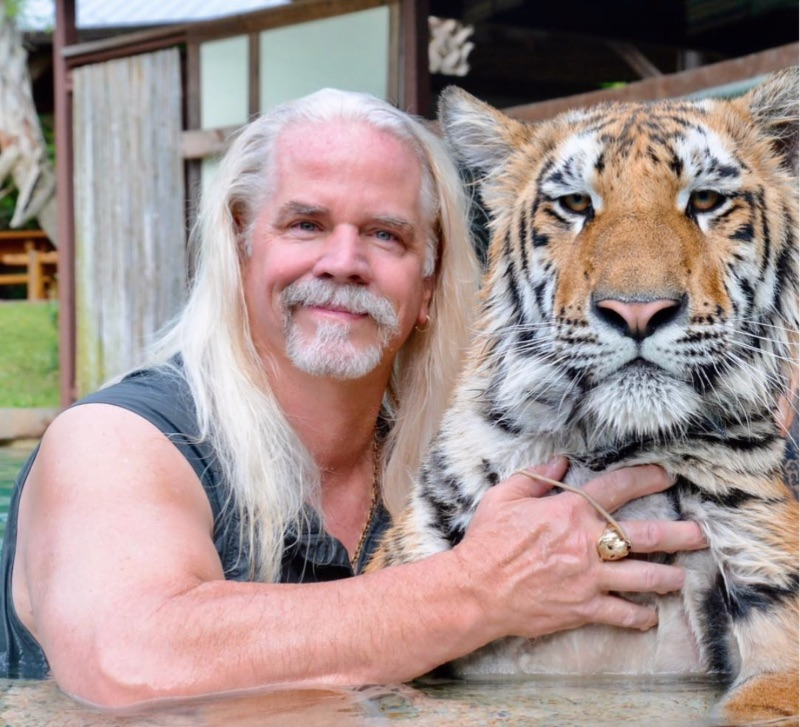
- Antle at Myrtle Beach Safari in 2020
- Born: Kevin Antle; March 25, 1960 (age 66); Salinas, California, U.S.
- Other name: Doc Antle
- Occupations: Animal trainer, zoo operator
- Known for: Operator of the Myrtle Beach Safari
- Spouses: Betsy "Brami" Rodgers (divorced) Radha Hirsch (divorced) Dawn Thurston (died)
- Children: 4

Criminal details
- Conviction(s): State of Virginia; Conspiring to wildlife traffic (two counts); Federal; Wildlife trafficking; Conspiracy to commit money laundering
- Penalty: State of Virginia; Two years imprisonment (suspended sentence); $10,000 fine; Federal; Twelve months and one day of imprisonment; $55,000 fine; Three years supervised release

Bhagavan Mahamayavi "Doc" Antle (born Kevin Antle; March 25, 1960), is an American animal trainer and roadside zoo operator. He was convicted of wildlife trafficking and conspiracy to commit money laundering.

Antle began raising dogs in his youth, and started operating a private zoo in 1983. Antle has worked as an animal trainer for films including Ace Ventura and Dr. Dolittle in addition to appearing as a guest on several television shows. In 2020, he was featured in the first season of Netflix true crime documentary series Tiger King. Antle was the subject of a follow-up documentary Tiger King: The Doc Antle Story released in December 2021.

Antle has faced accusations of animal cruelty throughout his career. In 2020, Antle was charged with felony wildlife trafficking after an investigation by the Attorney General of Virginia. After his conviction in 2023, he was fined $10,000 and banned from owning wildlife in Virginia for five years. In 2022, Antle was arrested and charged by the FBI for wildlife trafficking and money laundering. In July 2025, Antle was sentenced to 12 months and one day in federal prison, a fine of $55,000, and three years of supervised release.

== Early life and education ==
Doc Antle was born in Salinas, California in 1960. Antle grew up on an industrial farm in Salinas, part of a wealthy family connected to Tanimura & Antle, an agricultural company. His father endowed him with a hefty trust fund after his death. Antle dropped out of school before the ninth grade. As teenagers, Antle and his girlfriend traveled to Virginia to attend a one month yoga retreat at Yogaville, a community founded by Swami Satchidananda Saraswati, an Indian spiritualist. Antle performed magic shows and became a close associate of Satchidananda.

Through family business connections, Antle traveled to China and received basic medical training to serve rural populations; he claims to have earned the nickname “doc”. Upon his return to the U.S. in the 1980s, he began practicing alternative medicine in Yogaville.

== Career ==
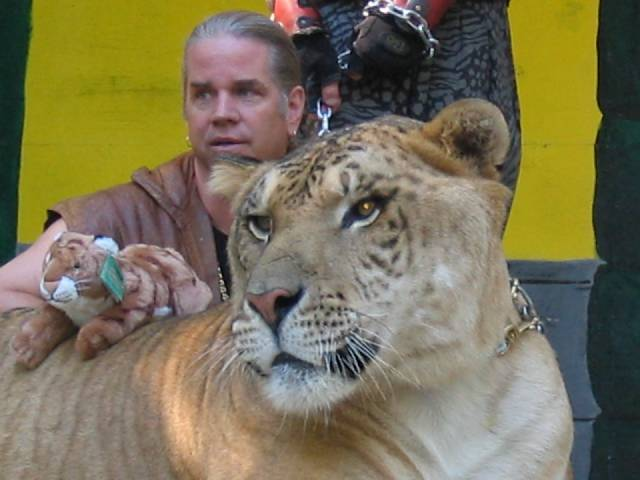
Antle in 2005 with a liger

In the 1980s Antle practiced as a magician and in 1983 opened a private zoo in Buckingham County, Virginia on a 14-acre (5.7 ha) property near the Yogaville ashram that held 100 animals including lions, tigers, bears, monkeys, and an elephant.

Antle is the founder and director of The Institute for Greatly Endangered and Rare Species (T.I.G.E.R.S.) in Myrtle Beach, South Carolina and the Myrtle Beach Safari, a tour that runs through the facility. He is a self-described conservationist and is the executive director of the Rare Species Fund, a nonprofit organization that purports to fund wildlife conservation. Journalists have raised questions about how revenue generated by Antle's cub petting tours is distributed between his business and his nonprofit organization.

=== Film and television ===
Writing in Variety, Rebecca Rubin states, "Antle has ties to Hollywood, having worked as an animal expert on films like "Dr. Dolittle" and "Ace Ventura: Pet Detective." He appeared frequently on late night talk shows and also provided creatures for movies including "The War," "Rudyard Kipling's The Jungle Book," "Ace Ventura: When Nature Calls," "Mighty Joe Young" and "The Jungle Book 2." Antle was credited as a "principal animal trainer" in the 1994 and 1995 Ace Ventura films, a "trainer" in the 1994 and 1997 Jungle Book films and as an animal trainer in Mighty Joe Young.

In 2001, Antle was on stage with Britney Spears during her performance of "I'm a Slave 4 U" at the 2001 MTV Video Music Awards, which featured a caged tiger and a large albino python draped over Spears' shoulders. In 2008, Suryia and Roscoe, an orangutan and an orphaned blue tick hound which had formed an unusual relationship at Antle's zoo, appeared on the Oprah Winfrey Show in Chicago.

== Controversy ==
Antle was the subject of a three-part true crime documentary spin-off of Tiger King, titled Tiger King: The Doc Antle Story released by Netflix on December 10, 2021.

=== Criminal charges ===
==== Virginia ====
Antle was indicted in October 2020 by a grand jury in Frederick County, Virginia, after a months-long investigation by the Animal Law Unit of the Virginia Attorney General. The charges included felony wildlife trafficking as well as misdemeanor animal cruelty and violations of the Endangered Species Act of 1973. A trial date was set for July 2022.

On June 21, 2023, Virginia prosecutors announced that a jury had convicted Antle of four total felony counts: two felony counts of wildlife trafficking and two felony counts of conspiring to wildlife traffic. Each count is punishable with up to 20 years in prison. He was found not guilty of nine misdemeanor charges. A sentencing hearing was set for September 14, 2023. At the hearing, the judge did not render a decision regarding Antle's sentence. On October 3, 2023, Antle was fined $10,000 and banned for five years from "possessing, trading or interacting with wild animals" in Virginia. He also received a suspended two-year prison sentence.

In February 2025, a Virginia appeals court threw out two of Antle's four felony convictions after agreeing with his lawyers' contention that Virginia statutes prohibited the sale of endangered species but not their purchase. His two convictions for conspiracy were upheld.

==== Federal ====
Antle was arrested on June 3, 2022, by the FBI and booked into jail for charges related to money laundering. He faced charges relating to illegally trafficking animals, including leopards, cheetahs and a chimpanzee, in violation of the Endangered Species Act of 1973. On November 6, 2023, he pleaded guilty to one count of wildlife trafficking under the Lacey Act and one count of conspiracy to commit money laundering, stemming from his illegal interstate sale of seven endangered animals, his falsification of paperwork to disguise the transactions as lawful intrastate transfers, and for disguising payments for the animals as lawful donations to his nonprofit. Federal authorities also uncovered evidence that Antle and an unidentified co-conspirator used bank accounts they controlled to launder large cash payments they believed to have been obtained through human smuggling by another individual.

Antle's federal sentencing hearing was scheduled for August 27, 2024, but it was ultimately postponed until July 2025.

On July 8, 2025, Antle was sentenced to 12 months and one day in federal prison, a fine of $55,000, and three years of supervised release. He was ordered to self-surrender within 60 days. The sentence was significantly less severe than what prosecutors had requested. Antle refused to speak to the media, but he released a statement reading, "Likely, the Court’s sentence reflected an understanding that the wildlife violations had nothing to do with animal neglect or abuse but instead centered around Mr. Antle’s failure to obtain the necessary permits," and that he is "grateful that the Court recognized his lifetime of care and commitment to wildlife around the globe". As of January 2026 he is incarcerated at Federal Correctional Institution, Williamsburg in Salters, South Carolina.

=== Accusations of running a cult ===
Former employees of Antle's zoo, Myrtle Beach Safari, have accused him of using the zoo to create a cult-like following around him. Antle has expressed expectations that his employees must see the zoo as more than a workplace, as it is an all encompassing lifestyle. Antle has required female employees to be single, childless, to abstain from eating meat, and to wear certain clothing and weigh within 20 pounds of their "perfect athletic weight." Writing for PopMatters, John Glover described Antle's operation as one where "staff is comprised of women who were groomed as teenagers for polygamy", an environment which Antle himself describes as a "complex lifestyle".

Barbara Fisher, a former employee of T.I.G.E.R.S. who worked with Antle from 1999 to 2007, stated that she was pressured to get breast implants while working at the facility and that several employees legally changed their names under the direction of Antle. In the Netflix show, Tiger King: The Doc Antle Story, Antle's former partner, Sumati Steinberg, alleges that when she tried to leave, Antle abused her by choking her until she passed out and breaking two of her ribs.

Antle has criticized the accusations against him and his facility, specifically calling Fisher's claims "ramblings" and saying she has "issues and somehow those have boiled up".

== Personal life ==
Antle is a vegetarian. He married his first wife, Betsy "Brami" Rodgers around the time they both attended a one month yoga retreat at Yogaville while teenagers. Rodgers and Antle have one child. Two of Antle's former partners have stated that he practiced polygamy and had initiated relationships with them while they were 14-year-old members of the Yogaville community. Antle had a long term relationship with Sumati Steinberg, and they have one child. Rodgers, Antle's first wife, has claimed that he established the polygamous relationships without her consent. Antle's second marriage was to Radha Hirsch. Antle and his third wife, Dawn Thurston, had two children, prior to Thurston's death in a car accident at age 29.

Several of Antle's children have worked with him at the Myrtle Beach Safari. Antle's daughters Tawny and Tilakam have both been criminally charged for animal cruelty and violations of the Endangered Species Act.
