= Robert Moor (author) =

American writer

Robert Moor is an American writer, currently based in Halfmoon Bay, British Columbia, Canada.

== Early life and education ==
Moor grew up in suburban Chicago. He received a BA in Literary Arts at Brown University. There he worked with Robert Coover and Thalia Field and was an editor and contributor to the College Hill Independent.

== Career ==
Moor has written for n+1,GQ, Outside, The Atlantic, Harper's,The New Yorker, and New York Magazine.

== Awards and honors ==
For his book, On Trails, Moor received the 2017 National Outdoor Book Award, the Pacific Northwest Book Award, and the 2018 William Saroyan International Prize for Writing.

In Trees won the Hilary Weston Writers' Trust Prize for Nonfiction in 2026.

== Books ==
- On Trails: An Exploration (2016)
- In Trees: An Exploration (2026)
