= Carole Baskin =

American conservationist (born 1961)

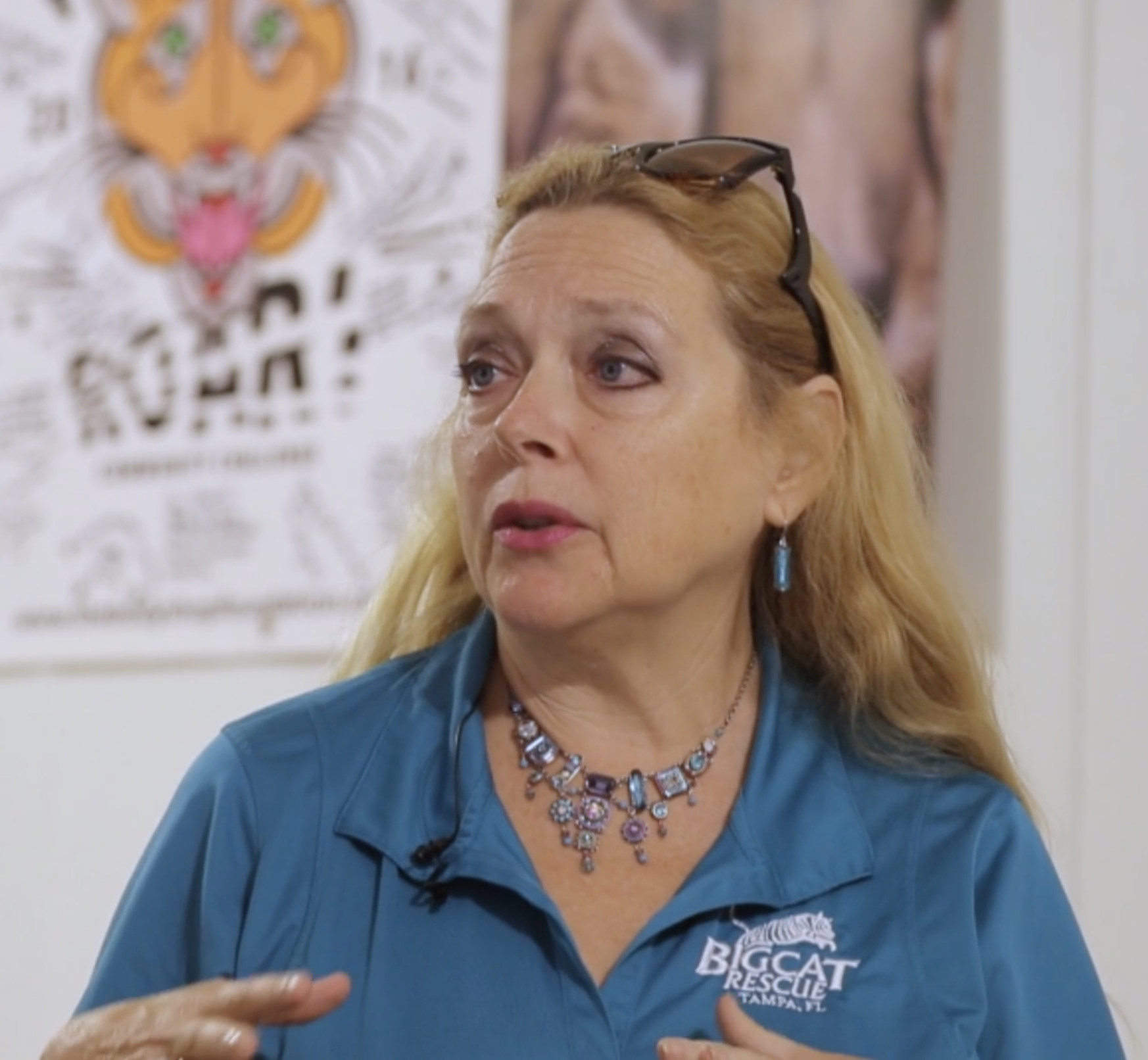
- Baskin in 2019
- Born: Carole Ann Stairs; June 6, 1961 (age 65); San Antonio, Texas, U.S.
- Other names: Carole Murdock; Carole Lewis
- Occupations: Animal sanctuary executive; animal rights activist
- Known for: Involvement in Tiger King and Dancing with the Stars
- Television: Tiger King (2020–2021); Dancing with the Stars (2020); Shooting Joe Exotic (2021)
- Spouses: Michael Murdock (m. 1979; div. 1990) Don Lewis (m. 1991; legal d. 2002) Howard Baskin (m. 2004)
- Children: 1
- Website: bigcatrescue.org/carole-baskin

Carole Ann Baskin (née Stairs; born June 6, 1961) is an American animal rights activist and the CEO of Big Cat Rescue, a non-profit animal sanctuary. She advocates for the plight of captive big cats.

Baskin was featured in the 2020 Netflix true crime documentary series Tiger King, which follows Baskin's escalating feud with Oklahoma-based private zoo owner Joe Exotic. Following the release of the series, many suspected Baskin was involved in the disappearance of Don Lewis, her second husband. Baskin denied these claims in a post on Big Cat Rescue's website. Her catchphrase, "Hey all you cool cats and kittens!", also became a meme as a result of Tiger King.

Baskin has also appeared on Dancing with the Stars, featuring her dancing to a cover of the song "Eye of the Tiger". She and her husband Howard also appeared in the 2021 Louis Theroux documentary Shooting Joe Exotic.

== Early life ==
Carole Ann Stairs was born on June 6, 1961, on Lackland Air Force Base in San Antonio, Texas.

She expressed an interest in saving cats when she was nine, but she decided against pursuing a career in veterinary medicine after she learned that veterinarians euthanize animals.

At age 14, Baskin reports having been gang raped by three men who lived across the street from her house, claiming that she received no emotional support from her family. She dropped out of high school and left home with a local roller rink employee. Baskin then hitchhiked back and forth between Florida and Bangor, Maine, sleeping under parked cars. She later purchased a Datsun truck and slept in the back with her pet cat.

== Career ==
=== Animals ===
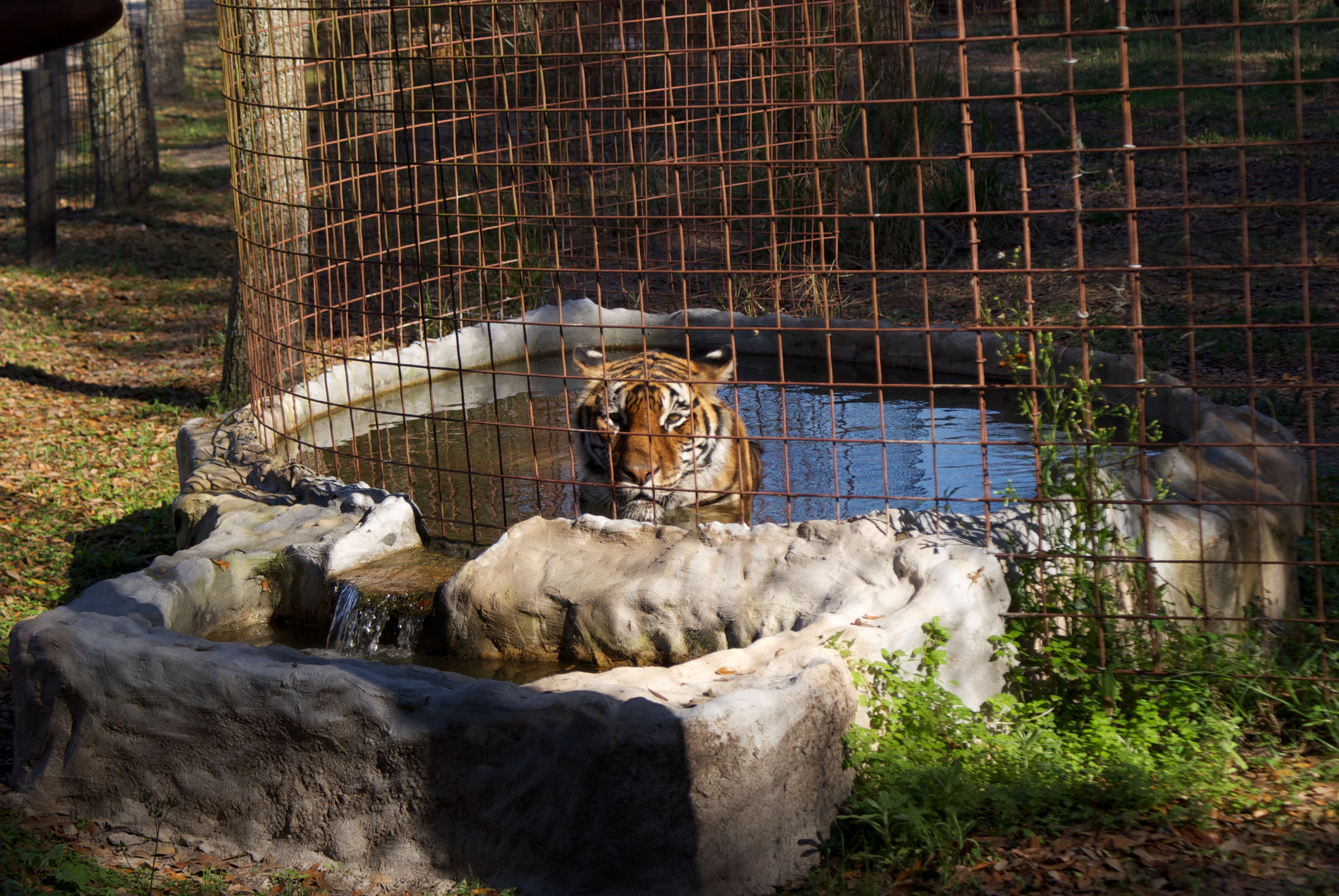
A tiger at Baskin's animal sanctuary Big Cat Rescue in 2012

At the age of 17, Baskin worked at a Tampa, Florida, department store. To make money, she began breeding show cats and used llamas for a lawn trimming business. In January 1991, Baskin married her second husband, Don Lewis, and joined his real estate business. The couple founded Wildlife on Easy Street, an animal sanctuary near Tampa for big cats, in 1992. Don and Carole Lewis never bred lion or tiger cubs but did breed 3 leopards and some other small cats before realizing the harm it was doing the animals and they stopped all breeding by 1997.

Baskin remains the current chief executive officer of the sanctuary, which she renamed to Big Cat Rescue sometime after Lewis's disappearance in 1997. She has used social media such as Facebook and YouTube and her The Cat Chat podcast to promote activism against private zoos.

=== Dancing with the Stars ===
In 2020, Baskin was cast in season 29 of Dancing with the Stars.

Week #	Dance/Song	Judges' score			Result
Week #	Dance/Song	Inaba	Hough	Tonioli	Result
1	Paso doble / "Eye of the Tiger"	4	4	3	No Elimination
2	Viennese waltz / "What's New Pussycat?"	6	5	5	Bottom two
3	Samba / "Circle of Life"	5	4	3	Eliminated

== Personal life ==
=== Relationships ===
Baskin moved in with Michael Murdock, her boss at the Tampa department store where she worked, when she was 17. The couple married on April 7, 1979. Baskin has said that she never loved Murdock and married him only because her parents were disappointed that they had been living together outside of marriage. She became pregnant in October 1979 and a daughter was born on July 16, 1980.

According to Baskin, in 1981, when she was 19, she threw a potato at Murdock as he attempted to attack her. She ran out of their home barefoot and met her next husband, Don Lewis, on Nebraska Avenue in Tampa. She and Lewis engaged in an affair while both were still married. She became one of Lewis's many girlfriends and substantially grew his wealth by helping him buy and sell real estate in 1984. The pair divorced their respective spouses and subsequently married in 1991.

Baskin claimed that Lewis was obsessed with sex and would frequently fly to Costa Rica, where he had substantial real estate holdings, to have affairs – timing the trips for whenever she was menstruating. In July 1997, Lewis filed a restraining order against Baskin, stating that she had threatened to kill him; the restraining order was rejected. Baskin said he filed for the restraining order because he was accumulating junk and she would have it hauled away while he was in Costa Rica. Lewis continued to live with Baskin afterwards. Lewis told her multiple times that he wanted a divorce, but she did not think he was ever serious about it. She says he was diagnosed with bipolar disorder months before he vanished.

Lewis disappeared in August 1997 and was declared legally dead in 2002. A dispute ensued between Baskin and the children of Lewis over his estate, with Baskin prevailing as the primary beneficiary. The case of Lewis' disappearance is still active as of 2023. In September 2020, during the broadcast of Baskin's appearances in Dancing with the Stars in select Florida television markets, including Tampa, Lewis's family and their attorney ran a commercial asking for anyone with information on his disappearance to come forward, offering a $100,000 reward.

Carole met Howard Baskin in November 2002 at a kick-off party for the newly formed No More Homeless Pets organization. He joined Big Cat Rescue soon after as chairman of the advisory board. He proposed to her in November 2003, and they married in November 2004.

In October 2020, Carole came out as bisexual.

=== Feud with Joe Exotic, appearances in Tiger King and Shooting Joe Exotic ===
Baskin had a long-running feud with Joe Exotic, the former owner of the Greater Wynnewood Exotic Animal Park in Wynnewood, Oklahoma. The feud began in 2009 when Big Cat Rescue volunteers initiated an email protest campaign against shopping malls that hosted Exotic's traveling cub-petting shows, prompting many malls to cancel the events. Faced with a loss of income, Exotic responded with a pattern of harassment against Baskin, culminating in rebranding his shows with unlicensed facsimiles of the Big Cat Rescue name and logo and a false Florida phone number; in response, Baskin pursued legal action, alleging that Exotic's trademark infringement damaged the reputation of her organization. In 2013, a court ordered him to pay Baskin $1 million in damages, leading to his bankruptcy. In 2020, he was convicted of attempting to hire two men to kill her, and was sentenced to 22 years in prison. Baskin was grateful about his imprisonment, but stated in a video on the Big Cat Rescue website that other big cat owners had been prosecuted as well.

In November 2019, Universal Content Productions announced that they were adapting a Joe Exotic podcast for television, with Kate McKinnon portraying Baskin. This was released as Joe v Carole on Peacock on March 3, 2022. Season 1, episode 3, alludes to new information of Don Lewis having abused Carole and her minor daughter Jamie years before his disappearance.

In March 2020, Baskin was featured in the Netflix documentary Tiger King. While filming, she and Howard were told that the series would be "the big cat version of Blackfish" and would help stop cub abuse. They were also told that, while Exotic and the disappearance of Don Lewis would be featured in the series, they would not be the focus. Several of the zookeepers featured in the documentary, including Exotic (who had previously made a diss track referencing Lewis' disappearance in 2015) and Tabraue, believe that she was responsible for Lewis' disappearance. After Tiger King was released, Baskin was cyberbullied over her speculated involvement in Lewis' disappearance via Internet memes, including a viral TikTok parody of the Megan Thee Stallion song "Savage" referencing Lewis' disappearance and sung by someone doing an impression of Exotic.

In response, Baskin posted an article on the Big Cat Rescue denying the claims made about her in Tiger King. She called the documentary "salacious and sensational", and criticized directors Eric Goode and Rebecca Chaiklin. Baskin said that she and her husband felt betrayed by the filmmakers, stating she was told the discussion of Joe Exotic and her missing husband were just for context. In a post on the Big Cat Rescue website, Baskin said that the show "has a segment [in the third episode] devoted to suggesting, with lies and innuendos from people who are not credible, that I had a role in the disappearance of my husband Don 21 years ago" and that the series "presents this without any regard for the truth". According to the Hillsborough County Sheriff's Office, there is no evidence that Don Lewis was the victim of a crime, and although Carole Baskin and numerous others have been investigated extensively, no one has ever been arrested or charged in relation to the case. Carole Baskin has steadily denied any involvement, and to defend his wife, Howard released a message on the DailyBigCat YouTube channel, stating that the claims about her being involved in Lewis's disappearance are "nonsense" and that Goode and Chaiklin "did not care about the animals or the truth". In response to Exotic's supporters who posted "free Joe Exotic", the Baskins remarked, "If you sincerely believe that a man who shoots five healthy, beautiful, majestic tigers in the head to make money deserves to be free, we are proud to have you as enemies."

In June 2020, a federal judge granted Exotic's former zoo property to Baskin and Big Cat Rescue on the basis that Exotic fraudulently transferred the zoo's real estate to his mother to avoid paying Baskin's $1M trademark judgment. Jeff Lowe's zoo operation was given 120 days to vacate the property. After the United States Department of Agriculture suspended the zoo's license in August 2020, citing poor veterinary care, Lowe closed the park permanently. Jeff and Lauren Lowe then relocated all of the big cats to Thackerville, Oklahoma, intending to open a new park there, but the U.S. Justice Department filed a lawsuit citing the Lowes' history of poor animal care; the park never opened and federal authorities seized all 68 big cats from the Lowes in May 2021.

In February 2021, Baskin revealed that she had been asked to feature in a planned second season of the show, but she refused and told the producers to "lose her number". A month later, she was interviewed alongside Howard Baskin by British filmmaker Louis Theroux for the BBC documentary Shooting Joe Exotic, during which they discussed Tiger King and the allegation that Baskin murdered Lewis, which she denied.

In July 2021, a three-judge panel for the 10th Circuit Court of Appeals ruled Exotic should serve a shorter sentence, saying the separate convictions for each man he tried to hire to kill Baskin should have been treated as one by the trial court. A new sentencing hearing was held on January 28, 2022, where Baskin testified that she was fearful that Exotic would threaten her if released. A federal judge resentenced Exotic to 21 years, a reduction of only one year.

On November 1, 2021, the Baskins filed a lawsuit against Netflix and Royal Goode Productions over an alleged breach of contract. They claim that their initial release did not grant the producers liberty to produce derivative works or sequels using the original footage shot of Carole and Howard. The lawsuit requested an injunction to stop the release of the film on November 17, but the same day the suit was filed a U.S. District Judge denied the request. The judge further added that the case would not necessarily entitle the Baskins to financial compensation. The Federal Court in Tampa Bay also denied a preliminary injunction on November 15, 2021, just two days before the show's premiere, after defense attorneys for Netflix said a delay would "hurt marketing momentum" and violate the First Amendment, which in this case would be classified "freedom of the press". In Tiger King 2, attorney Joseph Fritz produced a letter from the United States Department of Homeland Security (DHS) stating that Lewis had been found alive and well in Costa Rica. On her website, Carole states DHS did not exist until 2002, indicating the letter had to have been written at least five years after Lewis was last seen in Tampa. However, the Hillsborough County sheriff’s officer denied the existence of such a letter.

=== Politics ===
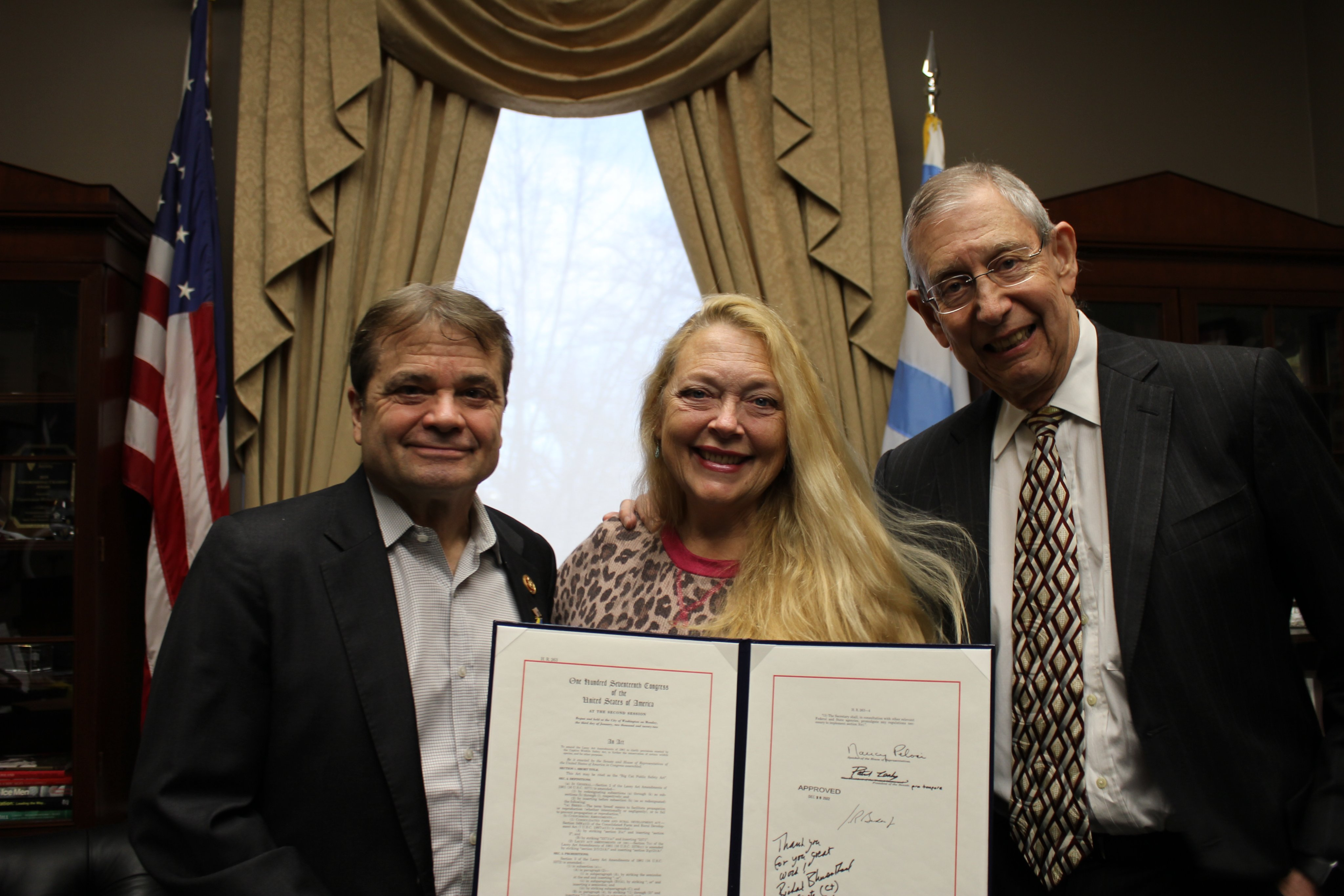
Carole and Howard Baskin (right) with Congressman Mike Quigley in 2023

Baskin, and her company Big Cat Rescue, have lobbied Congress to ban the private trade and ownership of exotic cats. Her life's work, and that of her family, included passage of the Big Cat Public Safety Act when it was signed into law on December 20, 2022, by President Joe Biden. The bill closed the loopholes in the Captive Wildlife Safety Act that she lobbied for from 1998 until its passage in 2003. The BCPSA bans contact with all big cats and their cubs and phases out private ownership of big cats.

== Filmography ==
=== Television ===
Year	Title	Role	Notes
2011	Fatal Attractions	Herself	Animal Planet documentary
2020–present	Tiger King	Herself	Netflix documentary
2020	Dancing with the Stars	Herself	Season 29 contestant (3 episodes)
2021	Carole Baskin's Cage Fight	Herself	Discovery+ (2 episodes)
2021	The Conservation Game	Herself	Peacock documentary
2021	Louis Theroux: Shooting Joe Exotic	Herself	BBC documentary
2023	House of Villains	Herself	E! reality competition
