= Milwaukee hip-hop =

Subgenre of Midwestern hip hop music

- Other names: Milwaukee rap; Milwaukee
- Stylistic origins: Midwestern hip-hop
- Cultural origins: 1980s

Subgenres
- Lowend

Milwaukee hip-hop is a subgenre of Midwestern hip-hop that is specific to Milwaukee, Wisconsin, with its cultural influence spreading nationally and throughout the Midwest. The identifying style of the sound includes clapping rhythms and heavy bass, which came to rise in the 2010s and 2020s.

Before the modern sound identity of Milwaukee emerged, there has been a strong legacy going back to the 1980s and 90s, with artists such as The Majestics, Rusty Pelicans, A-tack, and Coo Coo Cal. In the 2010s, the rise of the modern sound began with artists such as Chicken P, and was further propelled in the 2020s by the likes of Certified Trapper, J.P., and the Run Along Forever record label.

In contrast with the larger Midwest hip-hop genre and the neighboring Detroit rap scene, Milwaukee hip-hop has a much rowdier, more eccentric, and experimental sound. Sonically, it is evocative and of the drill and trap genres. In its recent innovations, including its presence on TikTok and Instagram, Milwaukee hip-hop has adopted a more brash and humorous style.

== Overview and history ==
Milwaukee

Since the mid-2010s, Milwaukee has undergone a creative resurgence through its growing scene, producing various artists who have been credited with hosting a signature "flamboyance" and idiosyncratic sound.

One of the most prominent characteristics of Milwaukee's current scene is the use of "low-end type" beats that feature heavy kicks, deep basslines, and 808s. Producers in the scene tend to incorporate chopped samples or original synth chords to complete their beats. Some examples of this style are Certified Trapper's "Each Smack" track or J.P.s "Party Mix" track. Another major characteristic of the current scene is the use of rather eccentric music videos and dance moves that are paired with the tracks.

=== 20th century ===
The 1980s saw the start of the Milwaukee rap scene. The region saw itself jumping onto the emerging rap scene in 1982 when R&B group The Majestics released the rap song "Class A". This song found itself drawing from the classic popular rap scene in the late 70s to 80s using jazz bass lines and a fun club chanting sound.

After that in 1985 "A-Tak On The Wax" by A-Tak was released. Similar to Class A, this song made use of the modern rap trends of strong strong vocals overtop of drum breaks. This song differentiated itself by its borrowing of rock guitars in between its rap verses. While Milwaukee was not the most popular location and did not house the big hip hop names in the 1980s, they found themselves showing that they had something to contribute and helped develop a local hip hop scene that would lead to future representation for the area.

In the early 1990s, Speech, a Milwaukee native, saw success with alternative-rap group Arrested Development, winning Best New Artist Award at the 35th Annual Grammy Awards.

=== 21st century ===
For nearly two decades, the Wisconsin rap scene was often associated with Coo Coo Cal's "My Projects" record that was the first and only Number One rap single to come from the region. Throughout the 2000s, the region struggled to find a sound or identity and even more importantly an audience.

Then, in the 2010s, the scene slowly began to find its own Lowend sound and identity, and since the 2020s the scene came into its own to thrive. The newfound success of the region can be attributed to the use of the social media platforms such as TikTok and Instagram artists to reach a broader audience, and receiving more attention from media outlets such as Rolling Stone, Pitchfork, and Wired.

A prominent record label and collective, Run Along Forever, emerged in the 2020s, fostering unprecedented levels of collaboration among local artists, and platformed growing talent nationally. Founded by Nolan Busalacchi, the label has collaborated with Certified Trapper, 414BigFrank, AyooLii, Sunny Lou, Lightris, Foenem, and many more. The collective elevated the sound to unseen popularity, holding a strong influence in the local culture.

== Impact ==
=== Hip Hop Week MKE ===
Hip Hop Week MKE, established in 2018 is an annual celebration held in Milwaukee distinguished as the first city in the United States to dedicate an entire week to celebrating Hip Hop culture. The event features a series of cultural celebrations, educational and community-wide activities intended to enrich and empower the city's residents.

The week-long celebration features a diverse array of events including live performances, seminars, and public forums. Notable artists such as Lakeyah, Megan Thee Stallion, Moneybagg Yo and Babyface Ray have performed at the event since its inception, drawing significant attention and participation from the community and outsiders. Seminars and workshops during the week focus on practical topics such as financial management, health, wellness, and voter registration, providing valuable resources and knowledge to attendees. In 2023, author Boyce Watkins spearheaded a discussion on financial literacy, and entrepreneur Damon Dash sat on a panel to discuss building generational wealth in black homes.

The establishment of Hip Hop Week MKE marks a significant recognition of Hip Hop's role in shaping societal and cultural narratives of the city. The event has garnered support from major sponsors including iHeartRadio, Milwaukee Bucks NBA franchise, and McDonald's, demonstrating a wide-reaching impact and showing a commitment to community development. It reflects the city's commitment to embracing and promoting cultural diversity through music and art while addressing key social challenges faced by its residents.

=== Contribution to the youth ===
The 'Outta Dee Box Podcast' hosted by Demancea "Dee" Star, is a podcast that hosts a platform for community engagement and mentorship, providing an educational resource and teaching young, troubled individuals how to set up podcast equipment and conduct interviews, equipping them with practical skills and a creative outlet. The podcast was inducted into the Milwaukee Hip Hop Museum in January 2024, and in 2023 it was awarded "Best Podcast" at the 365 Leadership Summit Awards further cementing its stronghold in Milwaukee's hip-hop history.

Your Move MKE, formerly The Hip-Hop Chess Club of Wisconsin, is a non-profit organization committed to using chess, hip-hop music, skilled trades, and writing as tools for teaching critical life skills. Originally mentored by MC Krook Rock, these programs are specifically designed to offer alternatives to street life, promoting self-awareness, discipline, and leadership among Milwaukee's young people. The program not only teaches practical skills but also helps participants understand the broader implications of their actions and choices in life.

In 2026, the label and collective Run Along Forever hosted a show at the Milwaukee Public Library to promote National Library Card Sign-up Month, with almost 1,000 attendees in the crowd there for the exclusively local artists.

== Notable figures ==
=== J.P. (Josiah Gillie) ===
Josiah Le'quince Gillie (born April 4, 2004), otherwise known as J.P., is an American rapper, producer, and audio engineer. J.P.'s style incorporates the typical Milwaukee-style beats with comedic lyrics and creative samples.

Growing up, J.P. had always had an interest in music, being a member of the Choir at his church. J.P. dabbled in many different genres such as rock, R&B, hip-hop, and country. It was suggested by a peer that he experiments with an emerging sound that consisted of what was known as "lowend beats". In 2020, while attending University of Wisconsin-Stevens Point as a student athlete, J.P. would begin to release music on his YouTube page and he would release his debut EP, Lion's Den, in February 2020. In December 2022, J.P. released "Juicey ahhh" which went viral on the social media platform known as TikTok. The song amassed over 1.2 million combined streams on major streaming services such as YouTube and Spotify. This song earned him co-signs from industry superstars such as Lil Uzi Vert and would later earn a feature from Detroit rapper, Sada Baby.

In 2024, JP followed up his most successful viral hit, "Bad Bitty", with the song spending six weeks on the TikTok Billboard Top 50, peaking at number 27. The remix included a verse with NLE Choppa.

Notable Discography
Title	Released
Bad Bitty	2024
Juicey Ahhh	2022
She Took	2024
Get Down	2023
Party Mix	2024

=== Certified Trapper ===
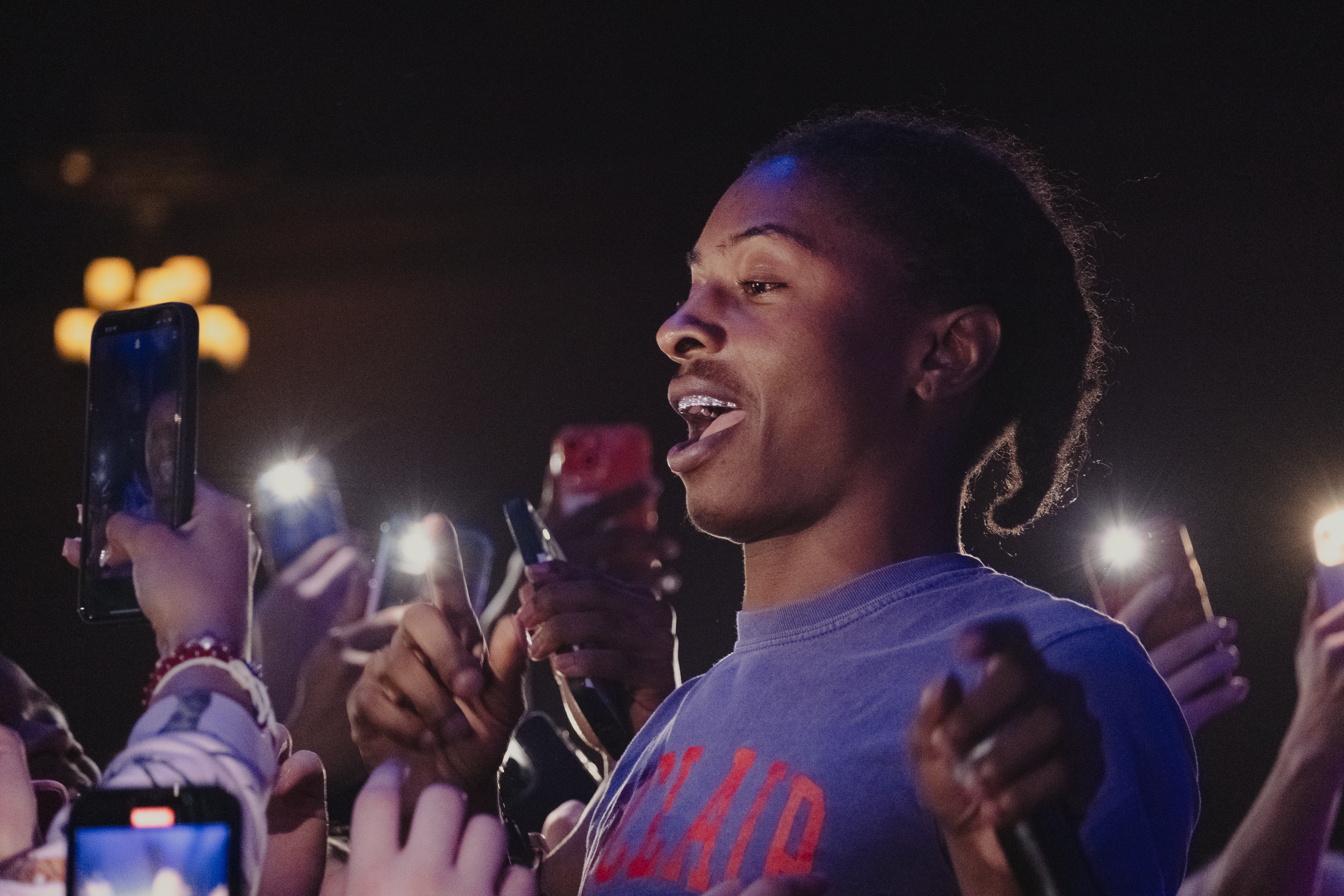
Graham during a performance on his 2024 tour

Daishun Graham (born 2001), known professionally as Certified Trapper, is an American rapper from Milwaukee, Wisconsin. Certified Trapper is most well known for his 2023 track "Oi (Beat Da Koto Nai)," and his affiliation with Michigan rapper BabyTron.

Graham grew up on Milwaukee's east side and first started experimenting with music at the age of 9. He originally began rapping under the name Lotta Guwopp and released his very first track titled "Free da guys intro" in 2016. He enrolled as a student at Milwaukee Area Technical College in 2019 where he studied audio production. His enrollment at the institution was short-lived but the move would prove to be a pivotal moment in his career as he began seriously publishing music shortly after in 2020. Since 2020, Graham has released over 30 albums comprising over 300 songs. As of April 2024, Graham is signed to Jeff Vaughn's Signal Records, an imprint of Columbia Records.

In regards to his style, Graham takes a rather unserious approach towards music. He incorporates rather goofy and sometimes even made-up lyrics over typical Milwaukee-style productions.

Notable Discography
Title	Released
Mario & Luigi	2024
Trappernese	2024
Oi (Beat Da Koto Nai)	2023
I'm Certified	2023
Catch One Stretch One	2022

=== Coo Coo Cal ===
Calvin Bellamy (born July 4, 1970), otherwise known as Coo Coo Cal, is an American rapper from Milwaukee, Wisconsin. Active from 1996 to 2022, Bellamy is most well known for his billboard chart-topping hit "My Projects" which was released in 2001.

Notable Discography
Title	Released
My Projects	2001

=== DC The Don ===
Daijon Cotty Davis (born August 3, 1999) , better known as DC the Don, is an American rapper who originates from Milwaukee, Wisconsin, but grew up in Los Angeles, California as well.

At the age of 16, he moved to LA to pursue a career in basketball. He was on the AAU team called Amateur Athletic Nation and the coach for that team was Lavar Ball. Davis became very close with the Ball family during his whole high school basketball career. In 2018, he graduated from Chino Hills High School a 3-star recruit and 34th player in his state.

In 2017, he decided that he wanted to pursue a music career. One of his very first tracks that became popular featuring Trippie Red and YBN Almighty Jay was called "Everything 1k".

Notable Discography
Title	Released
Red Light	2020
WORST DAY :(	2020
GET NAKED	2025

=== Lakeyah ===
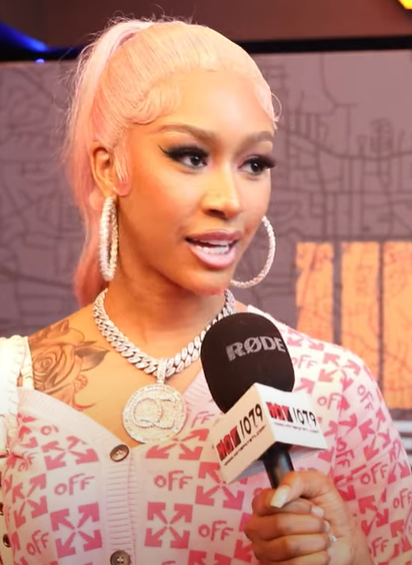
Lakeyah

Lakeyah Danaee Robinson, known as Lakeyah, is an American rapper, singer, and television personality who was born and raised in Milwaukee, Wisconsin. She first began rapping at the age of 15 but her career didn't take off until she turned 18. At the age of 18, she moved from Milwaukee to Atlanta, Georgia, and got signed to a well-known record label called "Quality Control Music".

In 2020, she released her first album called "Time's Up" featuring City Girls.

Notable Discography
Title	Released
Female Goat	2020
Big FlexHer	2020
Baby Wyd? w/ Nardo Wick	2021

=== Myaap ===
Amaiya Spain, known as Myaap (born 2006), is an upcoming American rapper born and raised in Milwaukee, Wisconsin. She represents Milwaukee's east side and she often collaborates with other artists from the area such as Certified Trapper. Her popularity came from her most viral TikTok songs. Those four hits are "Getting To It" "Wham", "Outside" and "Party Crackin". Most of her fan base resides from her hometown Milwaukee. Her fame grew from this article called "Pitch Fork". The record labels she is working with are "Rock Nation" and "Equity Distribution".

Notable Discography
Title	Released
Getting to it	2024
HTS	2023
Check the stats	2023

=== Tank ===
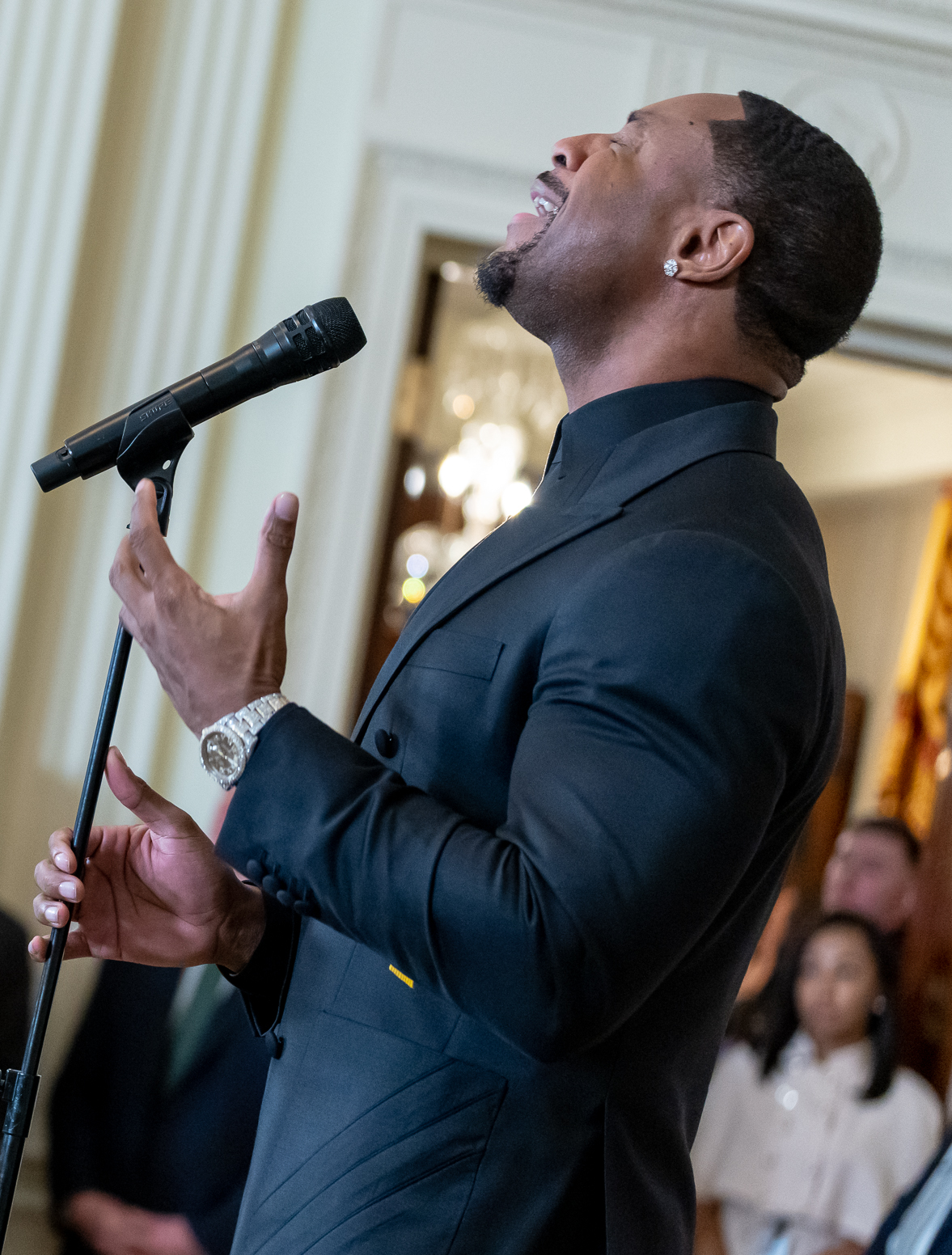
Tank performs at a Black History Month reception, Tuesday, February 6, 2024

Durrell Artaze Babbs (born January 1, 1976), better known by his stage name Tank, is an American R&B singer, songwriter, and record producer from Milwaukee, Wisconsin. He began his career as a backing vocalist for R&B singer Aaliyah, and signed a recording contract with her label, Blackground Records as a solo act in 1998. His 2001 single, "Maybe I Deserve" peaked within the top 40 of the Billboard Hot 100 and led his debut studio album, Force of Nature (2001).

Notable Discography
Title	Released
When we	2017
#BDAY	2016
Please Don't Go	2007

=== Jacob Latimore ===
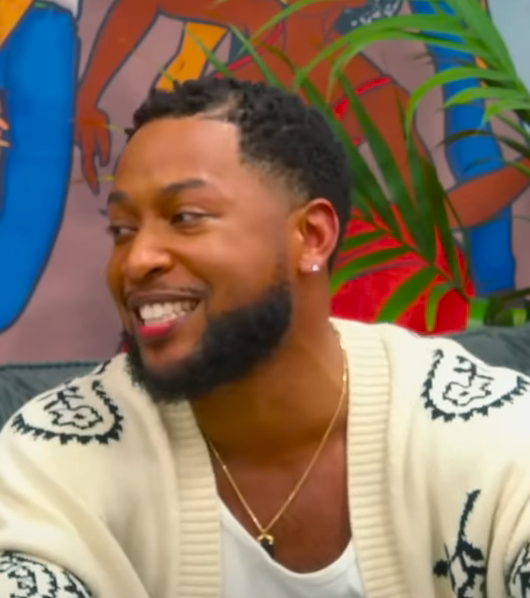
Latimore in 2023

Jacob O'Neal Latimore (born August 10, 1996), known professionally as Jacob Latimore, is an American actor, singer and dancer from Milwaukee, Wisconsin. In 2016, Latimore released his debut album Connection. As an actor, he is best known for his roles in Black Nativity, The Maze Runner, Collateral Beauty, Detroit, and The Chi.

Notable Discography
Title	Released
Don't Wanna Leave	2019
Like 'em all	2010

=== Chicken P ===
Rahkeip Davon Smith, known as Lil Chicken or Chicken P, rose to popularity in 2019 with his hit single Fast Cash Babies alongside rapper Jigg, who tragically passed in 2023. ChickenP is notable as the first commercially successful, lowend Milwaukee rapper in the modern era, proving the potential for the popularity of Milwaukee's developing unique sound.

In 2025, Smith was convicted of drug and gun charges, and was sentenced to 6 years in prison. Smith was further indicted on charges of four counts of rape, two counts of attempted rape, two counts of gross sexual imposition, abduction, and public indecency. In 2026, the rape and sexual assault charges were officially dropped and dismissed, although the other charges remain.

Notable Discography
Title	Released
Fast Cash Babies	2019

=== SteveDaStoner ===
Steven Harrington Glover, known as SteveDaStoner, is an American rapper from Milwaukee, Wisconsin. He first started rapping in 2015 and made a couple of unreleased mixtapes. Then in 2016 he was involved in a high speed chase which ended with him and his brother going to jail. In 2018, he went viral for his first EP called "2 Busy". This is mainly due to the bizarre dance moves displayed in the music video for his track titled "Too Busy". He has since followed up that success with the track titled "Barkin"

In 2024, Steve released the album I Don't Hold Grudges, finding viral success with the song RWS off of that album. The song gained popularity through a series viral videos released by Glover in which he entered public spaces unannounced to give a free concert. He performed alongside Ludacris in 2024.

Glover's style of dancing has had a large influence on popular dance moves, with Glover's dances replicated in many online videos such as Kai Cenat and by NFL players' touchdown celebrations.

Notable Discography
Title	Released
RWS	2024
Barkin	2022
Too Busy	2018

=== 414BigFrank ===
Frank Lee, known as 414BigFrank, or just Big Frank, is an American rapper from Milwaukee, Wisconsin. He began releasing music in 2020 and gained early success with breakout singles Backpack and Eat Her Up, rising to virality with accompanying dances on social media, gaining prominence in local culture. In 2024, Big Frank opened for Lil Uzi Vert and Lil Yachty, making his Summerfest debut.

In 2025, Big Frank released viral single There It Is, produced by Sunny Lou with the Run Along Forever record label & collective. This has further propelled his success as a local icon further defining the Milwaukee sound.

Notable Discography
Title	Released
There It Is	2025
Big Frank It	2025
Eat Her Up	2024
Backpack	2022

=== AyooLii ===
Ali Abdi, known as AyooLii, nicknamed Brudderman, is a rapper and producer, known for his experimental sound and comedic lyrics. Known most prominently for the single Schmackin Town, his versatility in vocal style has allowed him to be a prolific collaborator with many of artists within the scene, including Certified Trapper and Sunny Lou on many projects.

Notable Discography
Title	Released
Schmackin Town	2023
Perc 10	2023
Jungle	2023

=== Foenem ===
Rudy Jackson, known as Foenem, rose to popularity during the Brewers' 2026 World Series run with his single Milwaukee Brewers. The song became a rallying anthem for the team and the City as the Brewers progressed through the postseason and made their way to World Series victory. Originally gaining just social media virality, the song broke through to become popular with the fans at the ballpark, and was even sung by the players themselves. Foenem made an appearance with the Brewers in the Parade of Champions in front of 750,000 people in 2026

Notable Discography
Title	Released
Milwaukee Brewers	2026
Milwaukee County Zoo	2026

=== Sunny Lou ===
Luis Saafir, known as Sunny Lou, is a prominent producer that has come to have a major influence on shaping Milwaukee's sound, producing for the likes of 414BigFrank, Ayoolii, and Swaggy. Saafir had spent years working as an audio engineer and was at the verge of quitting, until the release of 414BigFrank's breakout single “There It Is”. Since then, he has worked with many artists, with the mission of propelling the city's sound upward to broader commercial success. Songs produced by Sunny Lou carry iconic producer tags with the phrase "I'm in the zone baby" or "This Milwaukee".

=== Christopher Gilbert ===
Christopher Gilbert is an emcee who has become a prominent figure in the Milwaukee's artist scene. Since 2021, Gilbert has been the official emcee of Summerfest, and appears frequently at local events. His work as a choreographer has also contributed to the dance moves that have come to define Milwaukee's music culture.
