= St. Louie =

St. Louie may refer to:

- St. Louis, a city in the United States
- "St. Louie", a song by Nelly from his 2000 album Country Grammar
