= St. Louis Bounce =

American rap style

St. Louis ("Blues") Bounce, also known as Bounce, is a subgenre of Midwestern hip-hop/Southern hip-hop music that made popular in the first decade of the 2000s by hip-hop artists and musical production teams in St. Louis, Missouri.

The style is distinguished primarily by melodic sing-song rapping over rhythmic bouncy beats laced with strictly-incorporated “bluesy” (or “country”) guitar-tinged riffs and chords. Although St. Louis Bounce borrows pounding basslines from Southern rap styles, it is usually distinguished by fairly strict bluesy (or "country") guitar riffs and chords on top of (or around) infectious bassy or percussive beats, which are sometimes accompanied by whimsical lyrics. Guitar riffs and chords are usually more prominent than piano or keyboard. It is not to be confused with alternative rap (ex. Arrested Development) or country rap.

Artists associated with the sound include Basement Beats (Jason "Jay-E" Epperson, Waiel "Wally Beamin" Yaghnam, Lavelle "City Spud" Webb and Jayson "Koko" Bridges), The Trak Starz (Alonzo "Zo" Lee Jr. & Shamar “Sham” Daugherty), The Trackboyz (Mark Williams and Joe Kent) production teams; and Steve “Blast” Wills, who claims to be the sound's originator.

The hip-hop sound was most prominent on rapper Nelly's debut album, Country Grammar, which was released June 27, 2000, which was then followed by Nellyville released on June 25, 2002, and the album, Free City, released by the St. Lunatics on June 5, 2001. The sound can also be heard on rapper Pretty Willie's (Willie Moore, Jr.), Enter The Life of Suella album, released on March 26, 2002, which was produced by Willie "JL" Woods and Alex "Big Al" Henry, both of St. Louis. The sound was heard prominently on the albums Jackpot, Powerballin', and Hoodstar, performed and released by St. Louis-based rapper Chingy in the early 2000s. Chingy was largely produced by The Trak Starz.

The Trackboyz's version of St. Louis Bounce used "unique beats and production that feature breathy gasps, visceral grunts, heel-pounding stomps, and wild clangs". The Trackboyz often created these sounds themselves. "Then, they threw in a bit of live guitar and bass."

== Examples ==
| Song/Track | Artist or Group | Producer/Production Team |
|---|---|---|
| "Country Grammar" | Nelly | Jason "Jay E" Epperson* (Basement Beats) |
| “Roll Wit Me” | Pretty Willie | Willie C. Moore / Willie Woods |
| “Wat The Hook Gon' Be” | Murphy Lee (St. Lunatics) | Murphy Lee & Jermaine Dupri |
| “Nellyville” | Nelly | Waiel "Wally" Yaghnam (Basement Beats) |
| "Tipsy" | J-Kwon | The Trackboyz |
| "Batter Up" | Nelly | Jason "Jay E" Epperson* (Basement Beats), Steve "Blast" Wills |
| "Na Na" | Pretty Willie | Willie C. Moore / Willie Woods |
| “Cry No More” | Pretty Willie | Willie C. Moore / Willie Woods |
| “Designer Love” | Pretty Willie | Willie C. Moore / Willie Woods |
| “Pimp Juice” | Nelly | Jason "Jay E" Epperson* (Basement Beats) |
| “Ride Wit Me” | Nelly | Jason "Jay E" Epperson* (Basement Beats) |
| “Right Thurr" | Chingy | The Trak Starz |
| "Midwest Swing" | St. Lunatics featuring Nelly | Jason "Jay E" Epperson* (Basement Beats) |
| “Bagg Up” | Chingy | DJ Quik |
| “Chingy Jackpot” | Chingy | The Trak Starz |
| “Work It” | Nelly featuring Justin Timberlake | Jason "Jay E" Epperson* (Basement Beats) |
| "E.I." | Nelly | Jason "Jay E" Epperson* (Basement Beats) |
| "#1" | Nelly | Waiel "Wally" Yaghnam (Basement Beats) |
| “One Call Away” | Chingy | The Trak Starz |
| “Shake Ya Tailfeather” | Nelly ft. P. Diddy and Murphy Lee | Nelly & Jayson "Koko" Bridges (Basement Beats) |
| “Boom D Boom” | St. Lunatics featuring Nelly | Waiel "Wally" Yaghnam (Basement Beats) |
| “Po’ Folks” | Nappy Roots | The Trackboyz |
| "Hood Hop" | J-Kwon | The Trackboyz |
| "30 Deep Diss" | VladHQ | New Wave Music Group |
