= BIN Reaper 3 =

2022 - 2023 album series by BabyTron

BIN Reaper 3 is an album series by the American rapper BabyTron, which serves as the third instalment in the BIN Reaper series of mixtapes. The two projects also serve as his third and fourth studio albums.

== BIN Reaper 3: Old Testament ==
BIN Reaper 3: Old Testament

Studio album by BabyTron
- Released: October 28, 2022
- Genre: Hip-hop; trap; scam rap; drill
- Length: 39:40
- Label: Hip Hop Lab; Empire

BabyTron chronology
Megatron (2022)	BIN Reaper 3: Old Testament (2022)	BIN Reaper 3: New Testament (2023)

BIN Reaper 3: Old Testament is the third studio album by the American rapper BabyTron, released on October 28, 2022, through Hip Hop Lab and Empire. It follows his 2021 mixtape BIN Reaper 2. The album was primarily produced by ByeKyle! and Damjonboi, with additional production from FtoMelly, Hokatiwi, Jake Sand, Steve-O, Mark Anthony, Enrgy Beats, and Danny G. It features guest appearances from Icewear Vezzo and BabyTron's rap groups Dog$hit Militia and ShittyBoyz.

=== Critical reception ===
Professional ratings
Review scores
Source	Rating
AllMusic	3/5 stars

In a mediocre review, AllMusic's Paul Simpson wrote, "BabyTron has a sharp, quick-witted style and no shortage of clever one-liners and pop culture references, and a few tracks like "Top 2 Not 2" and "AirTron" sport exciting beat changes."

=== Track listing ===
Credits adapted from Tidal.

BIN Reaper 3: Old Testament track listing
No.	Title	Producer(s)	Length
1.	"Genesis 1:1"	ByeKyle!	2:59
2.	"Top 2 Not 2"	FtoMelly; Hokatiwi; Jake Sand	3:12
3.	"Myspace"	Damjonboi	2:46
4.	"Silly Me"	Steve-O	3:01
5.	"Wake TF Up"	Mark Anthony	1:56
6.	"Drake & Josh" (featuring Dougie B)	ByeKyle!	2:51
7.	"'15-'16 Curry"	Damnjonboi	2:13
8.	"8th Wonder of the World"	ByeKyle!	1:38
9.	"Can You Swim?" (featuring Icewear Vezzo)	Helluva	2:35
10.	"Awful Lotta Yeah"	Enrgy Beats	2:31
11.	"One Side of Things"	Damjonboi	2:46
12.	"Rage Quit"	Danny G	2:14
13.	"D$M Cypher 2" (featuring Dog$hit Militia and ShittyBoyz)	Damjonboi	4:02
14.	"AirTron"	Mark Anthony	2:15
15.	"365 Day Grind"	ByeKyle!	2:34
Total length:			39:40

- "Wake TF Up" contains a sample of "Somebody's Watching Me" by Michael Jackson, Rockwell, and Jermaine Jackson.

=== Charts ===
Chart performance for Bin Reaper 3: Old Testament
Chart (2022)	Peak position
Billboard 200	69

== BIN Reaper 3: New Testament ==
BIN Reaper 3: New Testament

Studio album by BabyTron
- Released: January 13, 2023
- Genre: Hip-hop; trap; scam rap
- Length: 72:00
- Label: Hip Hop Lab; Empire

BabyTron chronology
BIN Reaper 3: Old Testament (2022)	BIN Reaper 3: New Testament (2023)	Out on Bond (2023)

BIN Reaper 3: New Testament is the fourth studio album by the American rapper BabyTron, released on January 13, 2023, through Hip Hop Lab and Empire. It follows his 2022 mixtape BIN Reaper 3: Old Testament (2022). It was produced primarily by ByeKyle!, with additional production from RJ Lamont, Helluva, Mark Anthony, Enrgy Beats, Damjonboi, Danny G, Jake Sand, Certified Trapper, Hokatiwi, Blue$trip, and Envy. It features guest appreances from Lil Yachty, Babyface Ray, Cordae, Rico Nasty, Remble, Kankan, Certified Trapper, Drego & Beno, RMC Mike, Babyfxce E, J1Hunnit, Prince Jefe, DaBoii, $camaurion, and BabyTron's hip-hop collective ShittyBoyz.

=== Critical reception ===
Professional ratings
Review scores
Source	Rating
Pitchfork	7.2/10
AllMusic	1.5/5 stars
Rap Reviews	6.5/10

In a mediocre review, AllMusic's Paul Simpson wrote, "The 26-track album features the same type of quick-witted, cartoon-referencing rhymes as its predecessor, but with more polished production, and appearances from major guest stars like Rico Nasty and Lil Yachty."

=== Track listing ===
Bin Reaper 3: New Testament track listing
No.	Title	Producer(s)	Length
1.	"Forever $cams"	ByeKyle!	3:47
2.	"Next Level 2"	ByeKyle!; RJ Lamont	3:52
3.	"Michigan Ave"	Hokatiwi	2:23
4.	"#FREEUNKY"	Helluva	3:02
5.	"Gimme That" (featuring Lil Yachty)	ByeKyle!	2:14
6.	"CatDog" (with Babyface Ray)	ByeKyle!	3:03
7.	"Beetleborgs" (with Cordae)	ByeKyle!	2:25
8.	"Mr. Hanky"	ByeKyle!	2:22
9.	"Remote Control"	Mark Anthony	2:54
10.	"RIP Hutch" (with Rico Nasty and Remble)	Mark Anthony	3:32
11.	"Mike Amiri Monster"	Enrgy Beats	2:14
12.	"Golden Child"	Damjonboi	2:48
13.	"Euphoria 2"	Damjonboi	2:41
14.	"Sunday School"	Danny G; Jake Sand	2:38
15.	"Dirty Draco" (featuring Kankan)	ByeKyle!	2:41
16.	"Zap Zone" (featuring Certified Trapper)	Certified Trapper	3:21
17.	"Ricky Henderson"	Damjonboi	3:13
18.	"Waffle House" (featuring Drego & Beno, ShittyBoyz, RMC Mike, Babyfxce E, J1Hunnit and Prince Jefe)	ByeKyle!	3:36
19.	"Mainstream Tron 2"	ByeKyle!	2:28
20.	"100 OVR"	ByeKyle!	2:47
21.	"Za Morant 2"	ByeKyle!	1:52
22.	"You Would've Thought" (with DaBoii)	Hokatiwi	2:45
23.	"Animorph"	Damjonboi	2:47
24.	"2 Easy"	Blue$trip	1:55
25.	"Tronalation 28:27"	ByeKyle!	2:28
26.	"I Can't Call It" (featuring $camaurion)	Envy	2:23
Total length:			72:00

=== Charts ===
Chart performance for Bin Reaper 3: New Testament
Chart (2023)	Peak position
Billboard 200	100
