= Kankan (rapper) =

American rapper (born 2000)

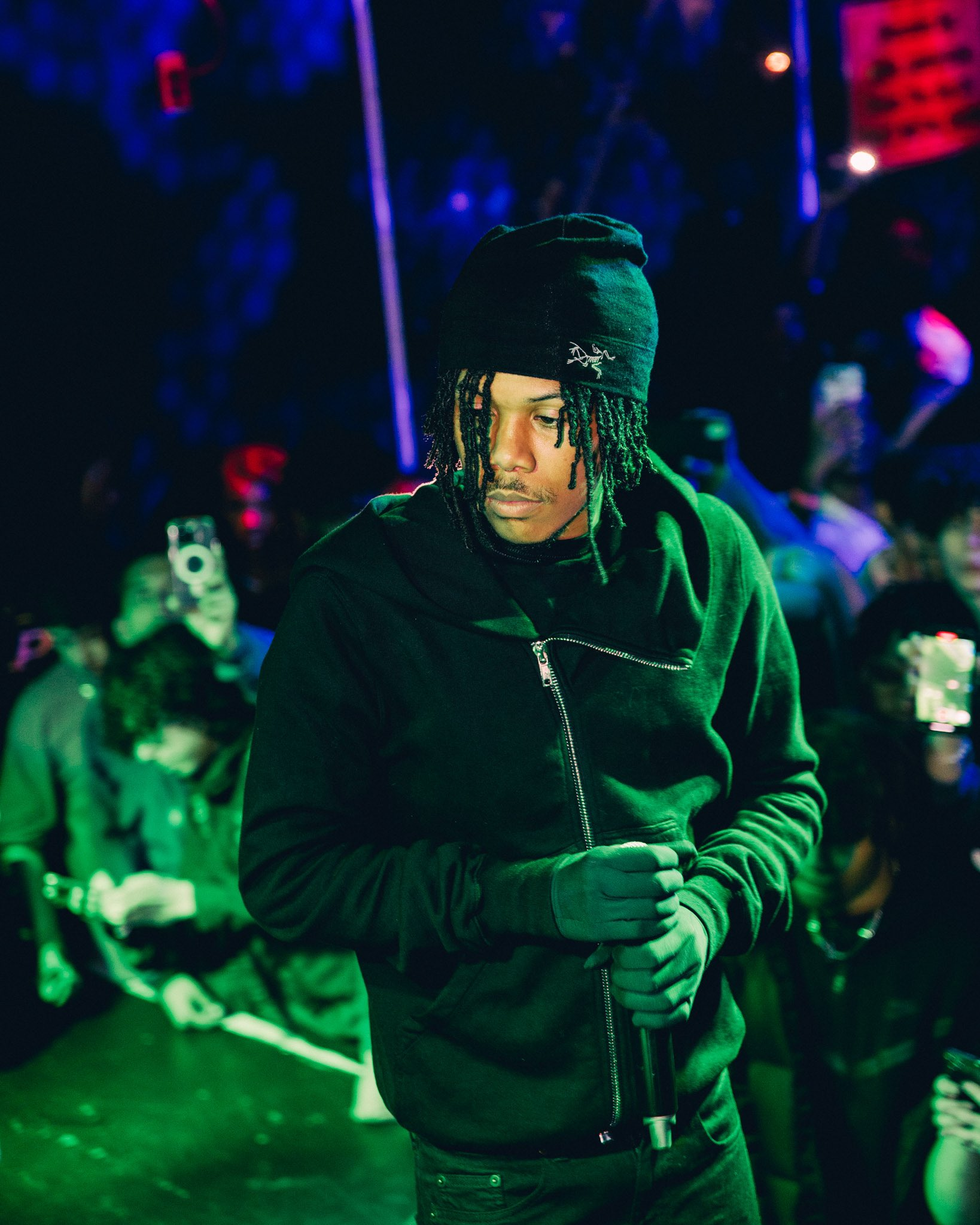
- Kankan in 2021

Background information
- Born: Keandrian Qynzel Jones; 22 September 2000 (age 26); Dallas, Texas, U.S.
- Genres: Trap; rage; plugg
- Occupations: Rapper, songwriter, producer
- Years active: 2016–present
- Label: EMPIRE

Keandrian Qynzel Jones (born September 22, 2000), known professionally as Kankan (formerly stylized as KANKAN), is an American rapper, producer, and songwriter. He rose to fame in 2021 with the release of his single "Woke Up".

== Early life ==
Jones was born on September 22, 2000, in Dallas, Texas. Jones grew up listening to artists such as Speaker Knockerz. He did not initially plan on becoming a rapper. In an interview, Jones claimed that he started rapping initially "as a joke". After realizing how much he enjoyed making music, Jones began to pursue music fully.

== Career ==
In 2017, Kankan produced for Smokepurpp. In 2019, Kankan collaborated with artist Fifty Grand. On October 5, 2021, Kankan released his debut album RR, featuring rapper Yeat. On September 30, 2022, Kankan released his second studio album Way2Geeked. On January 13, 2023, Kankan was featured on BabyTron's project, BIN Reaper 3: New Testament. In February 2025, Kankan released the precursor B4 F.E.B in buildup for his next project. Then, on October 24, 2025, Kankan released his third studio album, titled #F.E.B. On May 15, 2026, Kankan was featured on the track "Red Dot" with Lil Shine off of his album Get Rich Or Die Sippin.

== Musical style ==
Andy Kellman of AllMusic wrote how Kankan represents Dallas with his "unhurried flow and urgent lyrics".

== Critical reception ==
Kankan's music has often generated positive reviews, with Antonio Johri of Complex Networks writing that Kankan's track, "Goin' To Hell," has since then become an underground favorite due to its minimalistic flow and catchiness.

== Personal life ==
=== Legal issues ===
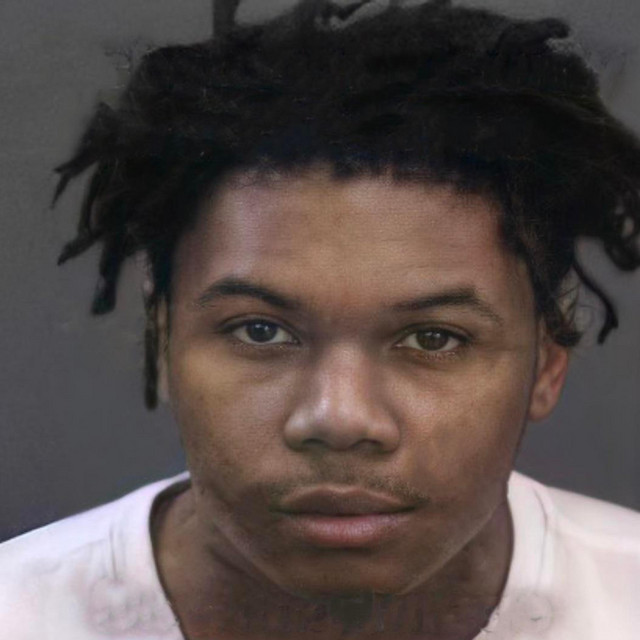
Kankan's mugshot in 2021.

In early 2021, Kankan was arrested for domestic abuse following an incident where he hit his girlfriend, Kandyxkat.

== Discography ==
=== Studio albums ===
List of albums, with selected details and chart positions
Title	Album details	Peak chart positions
Title	Album details	US Heat
RR	Released: October 5, 2021; Label: EMPIRE; Format: Digital download, streaming	—
Way2Geeked	Released: September 30, 2022; Label: EMPIRE; Format: Digital download, streaming	16
F.E.B	Released: October 24, 2025; Label: EMPIRE; Format: Digital download, streaming	

=== Extended plays ===
List of extended plays, with selected details
Title	Album details
##Radiant## (with SSGKobe)	Released: December 25, 2018
#In#My#Glo	Released: February 1, 2019
Radiant 2 (with SSGKobe)	Released: June 26, 2019
Packrunner EP	Released: August 14, 2019
Live Slay Die Slay	Released: September 14, 2019
BenjiKan	Released: September 18, 2019
#B4K2	Released: March 5, 2020
Oxy	Released: April 10, 2020
Kan Gianni	Released: April 18, 2020
Interstellar EP	Released: May 29, 2020
#B4K3	Released: July 4, 2020
KanGianni2	Released: August 13, 2020
InMyGlo2	Released: August 19, 2020
Fast Cars N Codeine	Released: September 23, 2020
#B4K4	Released: November 19, 2020
Codeine Graveyard	Released: December 1, 2020
Live Fast Die Slay 2	Released: December 25, 2020
Oxy & Codeine	Released: March 22, 2021
##B4RR	Released: June 11, 2021
##B4W2G	Released: June 24, 2022
B4 F.E.B	Released: August 13, 2025

=== Mixtapes ===
List of mixtapes, with selected details
Title	Mixtape details
Kankan	Released: November 7, 2019; Label: Self-released; Format: Digital download, streaming
B4 AMGs & SRTs	Released: December 3, 2020; Label: Self-released; Format: Digital download, streaming

== Tours ==
=== Co-headlining ===
- Next Gen Tour (with OsamaSon, Summrs, F1lthy, and Highway) (2023) (Cancelled)
