= Ice Spice (disambiguation) =

Ice Spice (born 2000) is an American rapper.

Ice Spice may also refer to:

- "Ice Spice", a single by NLE Choppa
- "Ice Spice", a song by BabyTron from the 2023 EP Out on Bond
