= Bad Bitty =

2024 single by J.P.

Single by J.P.

from the album Coming Out Party
- Released: February 9, 2024
- Genre: Lowend
- Length: 1:42
- Label: Equity Distribution
- Songwriter: Josiah Gillie
- Producers: J.P.; P tha Producer

J.P. singles chronology
"Yessir" (2024)	"Bad Bitty" (2024)	"She Took" (2024)

Music video
- "Bad Bitty" on YouTube

Remix cover
- Cover art of the official remix featuring NLE Choppa.
- "Bad Bitty (Remix)" on YouTube

"Bad Bitty" is a song by American rapper J.P., released on February 9, 2024, as the lead single from his fifth studio album, Coming Out Party (2024). It went viral on the video-sharing app TikTok and is considered his breakout hit. Produced by J.P. himself and P tha Producer, the song samples "We Can't Be Friends" by Dream Koala. An official remix featuring American NLE Choppa was released on August 1, 2024.

== Background ==
As with other music from J.P.'s early career, "Bad Bitty" was recorded on his phone using BandLab and headphones. The process took place in his dormitory room. J.P. teased the song via snippets on TikTok, before releasing it on February 9, 2024. In March, the song gained widespread attention on TikTok due to a viral head-bobbing choreography which J.P. popularized and meme involving the "noooo" ad-libs in the song's chorus. J.P. performed the song on the video series From the Block, which also helped propel the song to prominence.

== Composition ==
"Bad Bitty" is a lowend song with production composed of handclaps, 808s and guitar. J.P. raps melodically and uses ad-libs; the lyrics are centered on twerking.

== Critical reception ==
Alphonse Pierre of Pitchfork stated "'Bad Bitty' is fun, but it's still a real song. It wants to make you dance. It wants to make you fantasize about those dumbass nights out that you and your friends will talk about forever. These days, it's so easy to come across music that is blemish-free, that is more a display of deep pockets than any sort of creativity, that is made exactly in the mold of what you already like. In comparison, the unpolished, unseriousness of 'Bad Bitty' feels like it's from a different planet. It can be stuck in my head however long it needs to be." Writing for BET, Ural Garrett praised the song for its "pure charisma and attitude". Vivian Medithi of The Fader described the song as "the sort of effortless summer jam that spurs haters to claim a rapper sold his soul to a label or partook in some nefarious ceremony", in addition to calling the guitar strums "wistful", the 808s "perfectly rounded" and J.P.'s flow "effortlessly hooky, demanding you sing along with as much diaphragm as you can muster."

== Commercial performance ==
According to Luminate, "Bad Bitty" earned 440,000 streams in the United States during the period of February 16–22, 2024. It increased to 1.2 million official U.S. streams by the week of March 8–14 and collected over 21 million official on-demand U.S. streams through May 2. The song also spent six weeks on the TikTok Billboard Top 50, peaking at number 27.

== Remix ==
An official remix of the song was released on August 1, 2024. It features NLE Choppa, whose verse is about the women he likes. The remix received favorable reviews; Devin Morton of HotNewHipHop remarked "Choppa matches the energy of the track in a big way. That results in a very productive remix that will hopefully get more eyes on J.P." Raphael Helfand of The Fader commented, "NLE Choppa's verse on the new remix isn't anything revolutionary — and it's not like 'Bad Bitty' is in need of rejuvenation — but it's impressive how smoothly he slides into the song's silly scenery: a geeked-up country store at the intersection of Sicko Mobb and Reginald Wrangler."

== Charts ==
Chart performance for "Bad Bitty"
Chart (2024)	Peak position
US R&B/Hip-Hop Airplay (Billboard)	50
