= HitQuarters =

International music industry publication and contact database

- Website type: Music database, webzine
- Available in: English
- Website: www.hitquarters.com
- Registration: Yes
- Launched: September 20, 1999; 27 years ago
- Current status: Defunct

HitQuarters was an international music industry publication and contact database founded in 1999. It was noted for its in-depth interviews with industry figures, as well as its A&R and manager contact directory, free artist promo pages and song sale facility, demo reviews and A&R chart, and was the sister site to the songwriting tip sheet SongQuarters. The site was sporadically active from May 2017 up until September 20, 2020, and no posts have been made on its Twitter and Facebook accounts since March and May 2015 respectively.

== Focus on aiding unsigned and independent artists ==
The website had a strong focus on offering unsigned and independent artists, songwriters and producers with tools to help develop their music careers, whether through attracting the attentions of record label A&R and management, pitching songs and tracks, releasing and marketing music independently, or just learning more about how the music industry works.

To this aim the website featured an extensive contact database known as HitTracker, where users could find contact information for A&R, publishers, managers, producers and songwriters based on their track records, a news bulletin service, free artist promo pages, demo review feature judged by A&Rs, producers and managers, and an archive of several hundred interviews with industry figures that were geared towards offering constructive career advice and industry know-how.

Members of HitQuarters that had gone on to find success include Christelle, The Knife, Dominique Young Unique, Bobby Creekwater, Lesley Roy and State of Shock.

== Interviews and features ==
One of HitQuarters' most prominent features was its weekly in-depth interviews with major industry figures such as A&Rs, producers, managers, songwriters, promoters and publishers. Interviewees included pop impresario and entertainment mogul Simon Cowell, industry executives and A&R Martin Kierszenbaum, Mike Caren, Jason Flom, Peter Edge, Chris Hicks, Richard Russell, Miles Leonard and Ron Fair, managers Jonathan Dickins, Dumi, Louis Walsh and Eric Härle, songwriters Diane Warren, Wayne Hector, Rami Yacoub and Andreas Carlsson, producers RedOne, Chris Braide, Steve Mac, JR Rotem, Richard X and Phil Ek, and songwriter, producer and A&R Linda Perry.

Wind-up Records A&R Diana Meltzer poses with HitQuarters award that made her the first No.1 female A&R.

The website also ran a regular demo review feature where a changing panel of industry experts reviewed songs uploaded to the site by unsigned artists, assessing their hit potential and offering advice on how the tracks can be improved. Judges included Visible Noise CEO Julie Weir, and producers Colin Richardson and Eddie Galan and producer and publisher Steve "Blast" Wills.

== A&R chart ==
HitQuarters founded the world's first A&R chart that measured the success of individual A&R representatives based on points accumulated from their respective artists' chart success. Most notably, 2004 saw Wind-Up Records' Diana Meltzer become the first woman to top HitQuarters' World Top 100 A&R Chart, a considerable achievement in what is traditionally a male dominated field. Previous number 1s included Clive Davis, Tommy Mottola, Dr. Dre, and Mark Williams.

== SongQuarters ==
HitQuarters was a companion site to SongQuarters, an online tip sheet for "songwriting leads to major and developing artists". It shares the same contact directory as HitQuarters and its members automatically had access to the HitQuarters site. It was also a subscription-based service with 7-day trials available for those wanting to try it out first. The songwriting leads were split into three categories according to the level of the artist they relate to: 'Top 500', 'Newly Signed and Developing' and 'Unsigned and Up-and-coming'.
