= Christelle Avomo =

Gabonese musical artist

- Origin: Libreville, Gabon
- Genres: Pop/Rnb
- Years active: 2008-
- Website: http://www.christ-elle.com

Christelle (born Christelle Avomo in 1992) is a R&B/pop singer from Gabon. Her debut offering R&B/Pop EP was released on February 20, 2009 and it entered the Billboard Top 40 R&B/Hip-Hop Albums chart on May 9, 2009. She immigrated to Las Vegas, Nevada in 2006 without speaking English and started her music career in 2008, only 18 months prior to becoming a Top 40 success. She defines her sound as "Rihanna meets Janet Jackson".

== Early life ==
Christelle was born in Libreville in French speaking Gabon where she grew up listening to African, French and American music. Her inspirations were Beyoncé, Ashanti, Brandy and 50 Cent, even though she did not understand the English lyrics.

She immigrated to America in 2006, settling in Las Vegas with the initial goal of becoming a dental hygienist. She enrolled in an intensive English school and graduated in December 2007. In 2008, she started studies at the International Academy of Design and Technology along with vocal training with Jeffrey Skousan.

== Recording career ==
In 2008, she started working with producers and songwriters Don McGann and Neil Ebanks. They completed recordings of "Money Machine", "I'm A Tease" and "My Last Love" and submitted them to the A&R panel at HitQuarters, where she became Artist of the Week.

In 2009, she recorded "Can You Handle Me" featuring Agacee and released the R&B/Pop EP and "What You Gon' Do Wit It" featuring Dizzy D which was released as a maxi single and reached Billboard Top 10 Hot R&B/Hip-Hop Singles Sales in May.

== Discography ==
=== Albums ===
Year	Title	Charts
Year	Title	^{U.S. Top 40 R&B}
2009	R&B/Pop EP	32

=== Track listing ===
R&B/Pop EP

1. "Can You Handle Me" featuring Agacee — 3:06
2. "You're Busted" featuring mcdc — 3:17
3. "I'm a Tease" — 3:10
4. "Feelin' You (La La La)" — 4:34
5. "I Can't Be Me" — 4:08
6. "Excess Vibration" — 3:29

=== Singles ===
Year	Title	Charts
Year	Title	^{U.S. Hot R&B Singles}
2009	"What You Gon Do Wit It"	—
