= Out on Bond =

2023 EP by BabyTron

EP by BabyTron
- Released: February 24, 2023
- Length: 11:54
- Labels: The Hip Hop Lab; Empire
- Producers: Certified Trapper; Damjonboi; Enrgy Beats; Hokatiwi

BabyTron chronology
BIN Reaper 3: New Testament (2023)	Out on Bond (2023)	6 (2023)

Out on Bond is the fourth solo extended play (EP) by the American rapper BabyTron. It was surprise-released by The Hip Hop Lab Records and Empire Distribution on February 24, 2023. After being arrested in Nebraska for drug possession, BabyTron was released on bond and began working on Out on Bond. It was recorded on the road and at his house with production handled by Certified Trapper, Damjonboi, Enrgy Beats, and Hokatiwi; the former also makes a guest appearance on the EP. Sonically, the EP is random and consists of unpredictable moments atop video game-esque production. Its cover artwork is an edited version of BabyTron's mug shot, with a fake mustache and hat added to resemble the video game character Mario. Out on Bond received a positive review from HipHopDX, who praised the EP for being a high-energy and concise release.

== Background and composition ==
=== Background ===
On February 8, 2023, BabyTron was arrested in Nebraska during a traffic stop for drug possession while on tour in support of his fourth studio album BIN Reaper 3: New Testament (2023). On February 15, Twitter users posted about his arrest, making his mug shot go viral on the platform. Some fans became worried about BabyTron's legal status and commented "Free BabyTron" during his Instagram Live video. After being released on bond later in February, he began recording Out on Bond while on the road and finished it at his home. Production was handled by Certified Trapper, Damjonboi, Enrgy Beats, and Hokatiwi.

=== Composition ===
"Out on Bond"
The lyrics in "Out on Bond" mock BabyTron's fans worried about his legal status and include humor-filled quips.

Out on Bond is a 12-minute long extended play (EP) that contains five tracks. Its randomness in sound brings unpredictable moments for the listener. Peter A. Berry of HipHopDX highlighted the EP's "mischievous stanzas and technicolor flexes" and thought that its production sounds like it could be in a video game. Out on Bond's opening track is "Out on Bond", which begins with BabyTron mocking his fans who were worried about his legal status: "Stop saying free me, I was out the next day — that's a broke problem". The song's lyrics also contain humor-filled quips: "Worried if I'm locked up, make sure that your rent paid / All my mans around me fresh like next year we in 10th grade". Berry highlighted the lines that show BabyTron rhyming locations such as Bucharest and Budapest with lines like "too majestic" and "lose the credit" on the following track, "A2Z". He also described Certified Trapper's vocal performance on the third track, "Long Nights", as "lackluster". The penultimate track, "Ice Spice", is a reference to the American rapper of the same name. The final track, "Overthinking", consists of reflective lyricism.

== Release and reception ==
Professional ratings
Review scores
Source	Rating
HipHopDX	3.9/5

Out on Bond was surprise-released on February 24, 2023, by The Hip Hop Lab Records and Empire Distribution. Its cover artwork features BabyTron's mug shot, edited with a fake hat and mustache resembling the video game character Mario. Its title is a reference to the fact that he was released on bond. Following its release, it received a positive review from HipHopDX. Berry praised the EP for being a high-energy and concise release; he felt that its brevity helped keep it fresh and avoid the monotony that can sometimes come with BabyTron's longer releases.

== Track listing ==
No.	Title	Producer(s)	Length
1.	"Out on Bond"	Enrgy Beats	1:20
2.	"A2Z"	Enrgy Beats	2:40
3.	"Long Nights" (featuring Certified Trapper)	Certified Trapper	3:07
4.	"Ice Spice"	Damjonboi	2:35
5.	"Overthinking"	Hokatiwi	2:12
Total length:			11:54
