= Midwestern hip-hop =

Music genre

- Other names: Midwestern rap, Midwest hip-hop, Midwest rap
- Stylistic origins: Hip-hop; East Coast hip-hop; West Coast hip-hop
- Cultural origins: late 1980s, midwestern United States especially Chicago, Detroit, Cleveland, St. Louis and Minneapolis
- Derivative forms: Drill

Subgenres
- Chopper rap; Bounce midwest; Twin Cities hip-hop; Michigan rap; Milwaukee hip-hop

Regional scenes
- Illinois; Indiana; Iowa; Kansas; Michigan; Minnesota; Missouri; Ohio; Wisconsin

Local scenes
- Chicago; Cleveland; Detroit; Minneapolis; St. Louis

Midwestern hip-hop, also known as Midwestern rap, is a style of hip-hop that originated in the Midwest region of the United States. The genre initially gained popularity in the mid-1990s thanks to extremely fast rappers known as "choppers", such as Bone Thugs-n-Harmony (Cleveland), Twista, Da Brat and Common (Chicago), Tech N9ne (Kansas City), Atmosphere (Minneapolis), and Eminem (Detroit).

However, while these artists were the first to introduce Midwest rap which rivaled the popularity of West Coast and East Coast styles, a new wave of groups and artists began to emerge, such as Nelly, D12, Common, and Kanye West, although they shared very few similarities with their predecessors. Other notable rappers and producers from the Midwest include Chief Keef, Danny Brown, Lupe Fiasco, Royce da 5'9", J Dilla, Elzhi, Kid Cudi, Freddie Gibbs, Obie Trice, and Brother Ali.

== Style ==
Although the Midwest hip-hop scene encompasses a wide range of local styles, several recurring characteristics are commonly associated with the region. One of the most notable elements is the tempo, which often varies between 90 and 180 beats per minute, reflecting a broad rhythmic spectrum. A particularly distinctive feature is the use of fast-paced and rhythmically complex vocal delivery, commonly referred to as chopper style. This technique, popularized by artists such as Eminem, Twista, Da Brat, and Tech N9ne, is characterized by rapid articulation, intricate rhyme schemes, and precise control of timing and breath. In addition to its technical emphasis, Midwest hip-hop frequently integrates melodic components, such as sung hooks and harmonized vocals, into its structure. The combination of accelerated lyricism and melodic expression has contributed to a stylistic identity that is both rhythmically dynamic and musically adaptable. Nevertheless, significant regional variation persists across the Midwest, and differences in production, themes, and delivery between cities and states often prevent the formation of a singular, unified musical aesthetic.

== Scenes ==
Depending on the geographical location of the city (north or south), Midwest rappers draw from different influences, which results in a wide diversity of sounds.

=== Chicago ===
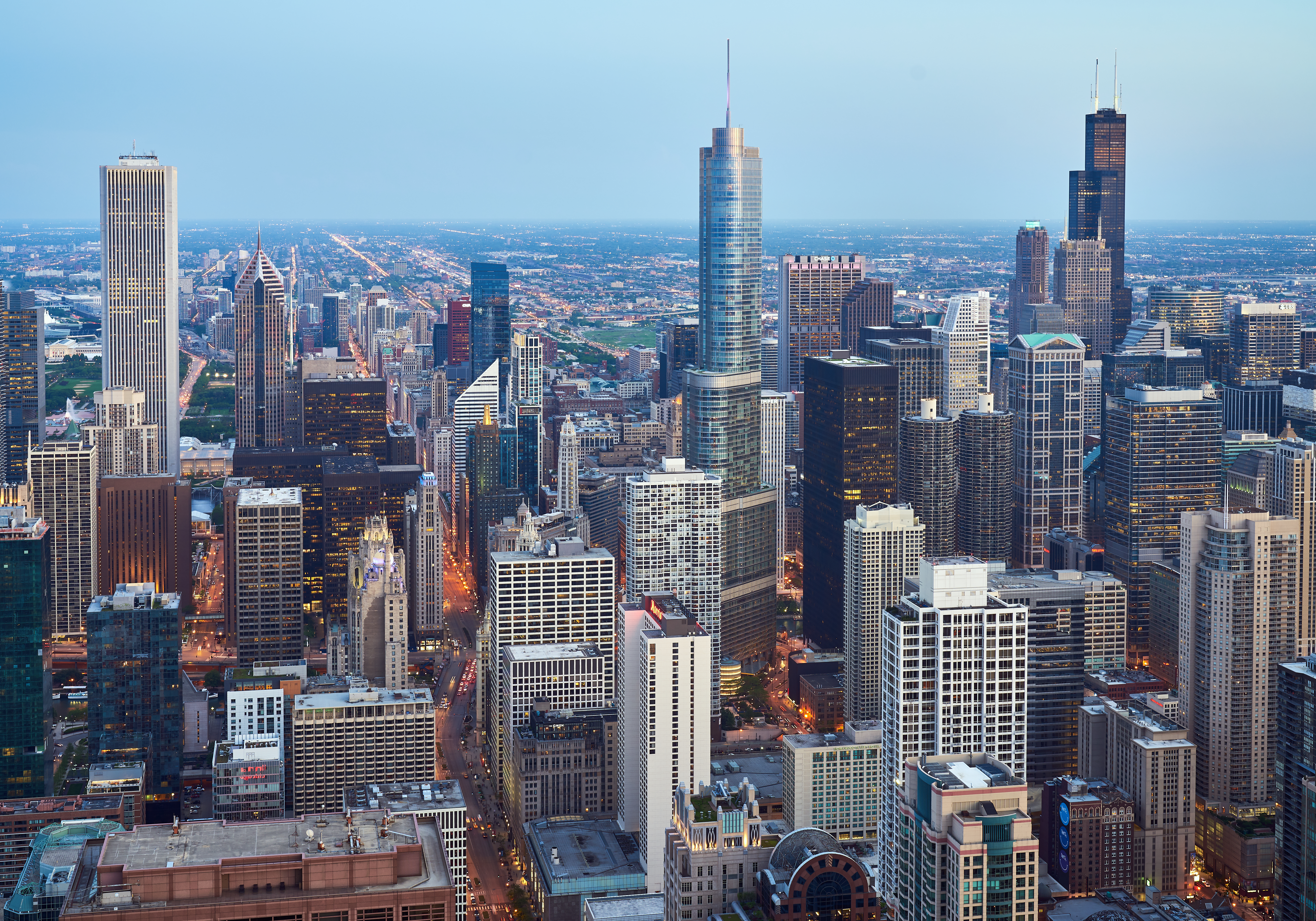
Chicago.

Chicago (Illinois), the largest city in the Midwest and the third-largest in the United States, was not immune to the rise of hip-hop culture in the early 1990s. During the golden age of rap, a number of talented artists emerged, such as Common, whose music is characterized by a heavy use of jazz and soul samples, as well as a thoughtful writing style. The charismatic Twista, widely recognized as the rapper with the fastest flow, also gained prominence, along with Da Brat, a rapper who achieved great success during this period, discovered in part by producer Jermaine Dupri of the So So Def label. Other notable names from the scene include Kanye West, Lupe Fiasco, Crucial Conflict, Rhymefest, Do or Die, Snypaz, Bump J and GLC. Chicago is also home to many underground rappers who remain largely unknown outside the borders of Illinois, or even outside the city itself.

Chicago has a thriving underground rap scene. Blogs like Fake Shore Drive, SBG (See Beyond Genre), and Midwest Live have become the "central nerve" of the local underground rap community. A 2009 film, I Am Hip-Hop: The Chicago Hip Hop Documentary, chronicles Chicago’s underground rap scene between 2004 and 2009. That same year, the song Legendary, released by Chicago rappers Saurus and Bones, Twista, and AK-47 of Do or Die, showcased a Midwest style featuring rapid-fire lyrics and a dark beat. Kevin Beecham, also known as Formless, compiled and wrote The Chicago Hip-Hop Story, which is featured on the Chicago-based hip-hop label Galapagos4’s website.

==== Drill music ====
Chicago drill music, which emerged in the early 2010s, quickly established itself as a defining subgenre within the Midwest hip-hop landscape and gained significant influence across the United States. Chief Keef is widely credited as a pioneer of the genre with his breakout 2012 single "I Don’t Like", which brought drill music to national attention and inspired a wave of artists in and beyond Chicago. His debut album Finally Rich further solidified his influence, introducing a broader audience to the sound of Chicago drill. His early work helped define the sound with its minimalistic yet menacing production and his confrontational style. G Herbo, another key figure emerging from Chicago's drill scene, gained critical acclaim for blending aggressive lyricism with introspective storytelling, notably on albums like Humble Beast and PTSD, which have helped expand the emotional range of drill music. Lil Durk, originally one of the pioneers of the drill movement in the early 2010s, has since evolved into one of its most influential figures, distinguished by his ability to incorporate melodic structures and emotional introspection into the genre’s traditionally abrasive sound. By 2019, with the release of projects such as Love Songs 4 the Streets 2 and Just Cause Y'all Waited 2, he had effectively expanded his reach beyond the Chicago scene, establishing a prominent presence on the international hip-hop stage. His collaborations with high-profile artists such as Lil Baby and Polo G have helped drill transcend Chicago, pushing it into the mainstream hip-hop scene. King Von, a protégé of Lil Durk and a key figure until his tragic death in 2020, became known for his vivid storytelling and authentic depiction of street life, further adding emotional and narrative depth to the drill sound. With Welcome to O’Block, he cemented his legacy as one of the genre’s most compelling voices, blending raw lyricism with cinematic intensity. Together, these artists represent a generation that both honors drill’s raw, confrontational roots and pushes its boundaries by incorporating melodic elements and broader themes, ensuring the genre’s continued evolution and cultural relevance.

=== Cleveland ===
Cleveland began to witness a rise in local rappers through the early 1990s, spearheaded by groups such as Bone Thugs-N-Harmony. Their distinctive staccato lyrical delivery, paired to harmonized singing would ultimately prove marketable to a national audience, as the group gained the attention of California-rapper Eazy-E, who signed them to Ruthless Records in 1993. The West Coast influence on Cleveland's rap scene emerged as a hybrid of G-Funk influenced instrumentals paired to a staccato delivery known as chopper. Cleveland's prominence in the hip-hop community re emerged during the 2000s and 2010s with the commercial rise of rappers such as Kid Cudi and DaBaby.

=== Detroit ===
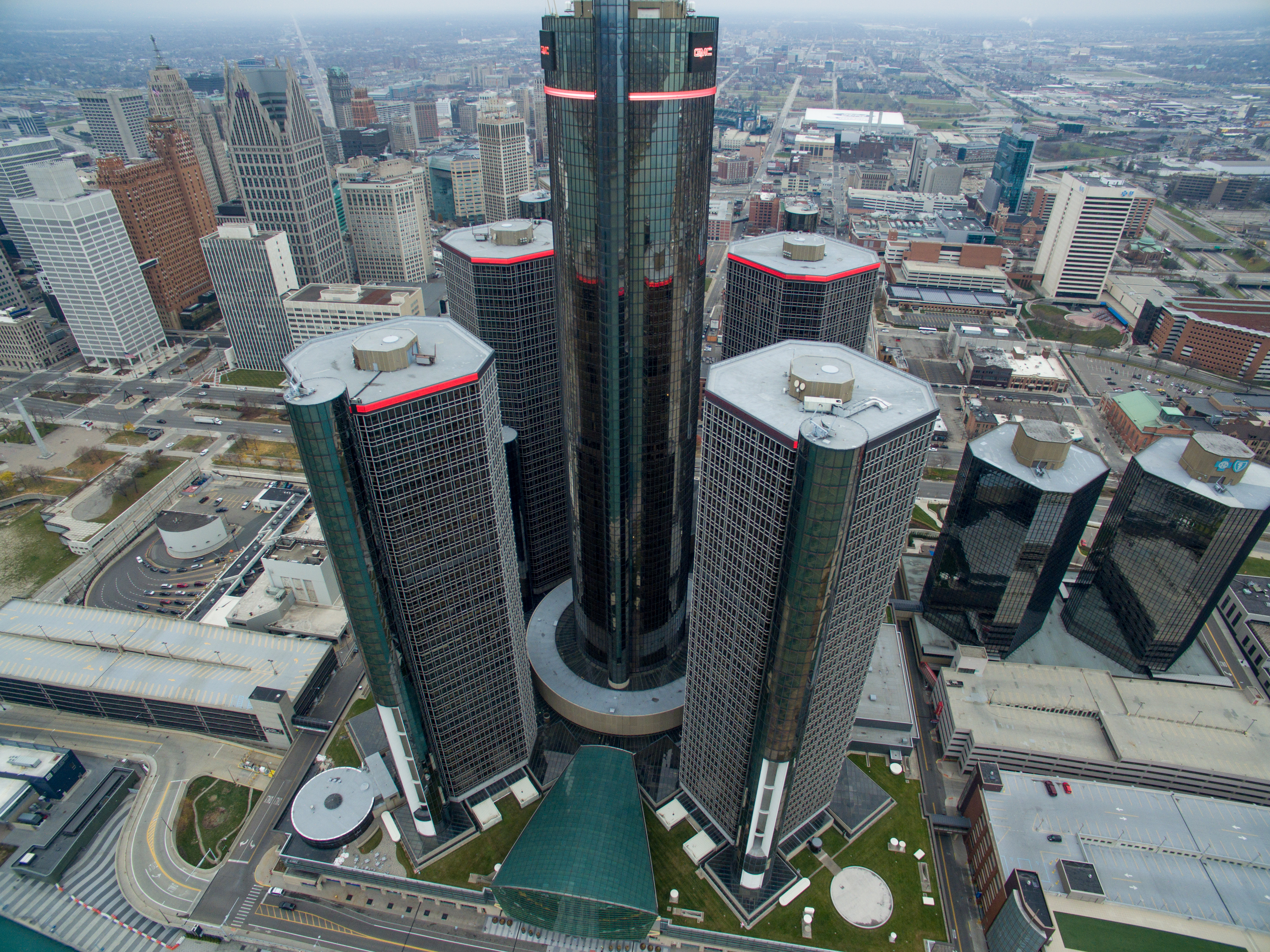
Detroit.

Detroit rapidly began to see itself as an epicenter for the growth of hip-hop in the American Midwest, particularly during the late 1990s and early 2000s. The city's distinctive influences showcase instrumentals reminiscent of East Coast hip-hop, but exemplifying far more aggressive lyrical content and darker undertones than often scene in New York's rappers.

==== Early Detroit hip-hop (1980s) ====
In 1980, Detroit electro duo Cybotron formed; the group were a staple of the Electrifying Mojo, an influential FM radio personality who helped popularize hip-hop music. The same year, Detroit record store Future Funk Records opened on West Seven Mile Road, and an aspiring hip-hop emcee named Jerry Flynn Dale befriended the owner, Carl Mitchell, and convinced him to allow Dale to set up a makeshift stage in the store, play instrumentals and rap, signaling the beginnings of Detroit's hip-hop scene, as aspiring rappers would use the store to battle rap, test out new songs and sell their albums, until 1992, when the store closed. Dale would initially produce hip-hop beats in his bedroom, before launching Def Sound Studios in Detroit in 1985. Another important figure who helped shape Detroit hip-hop was DJ the Blackman, who, as a teenager, helped teen emcees develop their lyrical skills in his basement. Additionally, Detroit radio disc jockey Billy T helped popularize hip-hop in Detroit through his programs Billy T's Basement Tapes and The Rap Blast, which exposed listeners to local developing emcees, helping to expand the genre's popularity in the city. However, the growing popularity of the genre was not without problems, as rap shows in Detroit often ended in violence in the developing years of the city's local scene at concert venues such as Harpo's.

The earliest successful Detroit rap act was the duo Felix & Jarvis, who released "The Flamethrower Rap" in 1983, utilizing large portions of the song "Flamethrower" by the J. Geils Band. However, it would take several years before more rap acts would come to prominence in Detroit. These would include Magic Juan & Normski and Prince Vince and the Hip-Hop Force, both of which debuted in 1988, as well as Awesome Dre & The Hardcore Committee, Kaos & Mystro, Merciless Amir, Esham and Nikki D, who all debuted in 1989. Detroit's Most Wanted and A.W.O.L. pioneered Detroit hardcore hip-hop and gangsta rap, respectively, while Prince Vince was one of the first rappers to sample the funk music of Detroit's Parliament-Funkadelic collective in his song "Gangster Funk", whose release predated the coining of the term G-funk by West Coast producer Dr. Dre.

==== National breakthrough (1990s) ====
The early 1990s Detroit hip-hop scene was the launching point for several prominent female rappers, including Nikki D., Smiley, and Boss. MC Breed, who was originally from Flint, Michigan, launched his career in Detroit and would go on to national success with a G-funk sound influenced by West Coast hip-hop, while Awesome Dre became the first Detroit rapper to appear on Yo! MTV Raps and BET's Rap City. The mid-90s would come to be known as Detroit hip-hop's "Golden Age". Despite the city being predominantly African American, many of Detroit's most successful hip-hop acts have been white rappers.

A thriving local hip-hop scene developed with club parties at St. Andrew's Hall on Friday evenings and the following day, at the clothing store the Hip-Hop Shop, emcee Proof hosted rap battles showcasing the skills of young, developing rap talents. The Hip Hop Shop opened in 1993 and closed in 1997, before reopening under new management in 2005, where it stayed in business until 2014, when the store shut down again. Not all Detroit rappers, however, developed their careers out of this battle rap scene, as Esham, Kid Rock and Insane Clown Posse all developed their own paths to success, before the Hip-Hop Shop had even opened. The Hip Hop Shop scene did, however, help a young Eminem develop his lyrical skills and flow. As M&M, he appeared on Bassmint Productions' single "Steppin' On To The Scene" in 1990. Two years later, he appeared in an acting performance in the music video for Champtown's single "Do-Da-Dippity". The same year, Champtown, Chaos Kid and Eminem formed the group Soul Intent, releasing "What Color Is Soul" in 1992, followed by "Biterphobia" and "Fuckin' Backstabber" in 1995, the latter of which featured an appearance from rapper Proof. Champtown released the album Check It the following year, in the same year Eminem released his debut album Infinite. After being discovered by Jimmy Iovine and Dr. Dre, Eminem would go on to achieve mainstream success with The Slim Shady LP in 1999, which was certified 5× platinum. Credited with popularizing hip-hop in middle America, Eminem is critically acclaimed as one of the greatest rappers of all time. Eminem's global success and acclaimed works are widely regarded as having broken racial barriers for the acceptance of white rappers in popular music, as well as helping launch the nationally successful careers of other Detroit rappers, including Hush, Proof, Obie Trice and Trick Trick, and forming the groups D12, and Bad Meets Evil, the latter of which featured fellow Detroit rapper Royce da 5'9".

Rapper, DJ and breakdancer Kid Rock was a member of the Beast Crew in the 1980s, alongside Champtown and the Blackman, before signing a solo record contract with Jive Records at the age of 17, releasing his debut album Grits Sandwiches for Breakfast in 1990. The label subsequently dropped Kid Rock, fearing that the backlash against white rapper Vanilla Ice would hurt Kid Rock's sales, and subsequently in 1993, a college radio station was fined $23,750 for playing Kid Rock's vulgar song, "Yo-Da-Lin In the Valley," the highest penalty leveled against a college radio station by the FCC up until that point. Undeterred by these controversies, Kid Rock continued to record independently. Although his debut album featured a hip-hop sound, the rapper became known locally in Detroit for his rap rock sound, which he developed with his backing band, Twisted Brown Trucker. After developing a strong local following in Detroit, Kid Rock signed with Atlantic Records and released his most successful album, Devil Without a Cause in 1998, which was certified diamond. Kid Rock also helped launch the careers of Detroit hip-hop artists Joe C., Uncle Kracker and Paradime. Additionally, Devil Without a Cause featured the national debut of Eminem, who delivered a guest verse on Kid Rock's song "Fuck Off" in exchange for Kid Rock scratching on Eminem's song "My Fault" on The Slim Shady LP, which was released the following year.

==== Further developments (1996 onward) ====
The late 1990s saw the launch of Detroit's booty bass scene, a sound that was popular at Belle Isle Park parties, with artists DJ Assault, DJ Godfather and Disco D, and fusions of hip-hop and techno with artists like Anthony "Shake" Shakir, Robert Hood, Daniel Bell, Claude Young, Kenny Larkin, Eddie "Flashin'" Fowlkes, and Stacey Pullen. After the Hip-Hop Shop first closed in 1997, Lush Lounge became the new launching pad for aspiring hip-hop emcees, until the mid-2000s, when it closed down, although it was briefly reopened in 2008. The following year, the sportswear store Bob's Classic Kicks began hosting the Air Up There Hip-Hop Showcase for developing hip-hop talents in its first 40 events, after which it has continued once a year at several other venues.

Curtis Hanson's 2002 film 8 Mile, featuring Eminem, explored the rap scene in Detroit. "Lose Yourself", featured on the film's soundtrack, won the Oscar for Best Original Song. Detroit hip-hop producer J Dilla developed his beat making skills as a member of the groups 1st Down and Slum Village, before embarking on a solo career in 2002; Dilla's music raised the artistic level of hip-hop production in Detroit, before his death in 2006. Dilla would subsequently become a major source of inspiration for future Detroit hip-hop artists, including Guilty Simpson and Elzhi. The 2010s saw the rise of Detroit's underground hip-hop scene with artists such as Danny Brown, and the Crown Nation collective's Quelle Chris and Denmark Vessey, and Nick Speed.

=== St. Louis ===
Similarly to Detroit; St. Louis began to see a prominent rise in the city's rap scene during the late 1990s and early 2000s with artists such as Nelly, Chingy, Murphy Lee, and J-Kwon each developing a national (and ultimately) an international presence. Nelly and Chingy quickly arose as the two most prominent rappers, after both enjoying widespread commercial success during the early 2000s. Nelly's first two studio albums both combined for nearly 20 million in sales between 2000 and 2002; while Chingy's debut would ultimately sell 2,000,000 copies upon its release. Stylistically, rappers from St. Louis utilize a mixture of local vernacular and upbeat pop-rap structures to achieve a distinct impression. Unlike Houston, St. Louis rappers rarely venture into using more distorted, aggressive beats to emphasize a more club-friendly style of instrumentals. The city has also produced a number of local successes and rappers, such as Sylk Smoove, Da Hol 9, Taylor Made, County Brown, Pretty Willie, Out of Order, Raw Reese, Vic Damone, Spaide Ripper, and Ruka Puff, along with some of the best rap songs from St. Louis like My Life Is Like a Whirlwind, Mobb Out, Nina Pop, Nikki, and Catch 22.

Sexyy Red gained traction in 2023 with her song "Pound Town".

=== Minneapolis ===
Sandman stands out, as he released two albums, The King of Hallucination and No Secrets No Lies. However, it is primarily the group Atmosphere that put the city of Minneapolis (Minnesota) on the map of rap.

Rhymesayers Entertainment has made a significant contribution to the development of rap in the Twin Cities (Minneapolis–Saint Paul) by producing artists such as Brother Ali, Atmosphere, Toki Wright, and others.

== See also ==
- Hip-hop
- Drill music
- Culture of Illinois
