= Megatron (album) =

2022 studio album by BabyTron

- Standard cover art (Note: The deluxe edition features a green background)

Studio album by BabyTron
- Released: March 4, 2022
- Genre: Michigan rap
- Length: 63:02
- Labels: The Hip Hop Lab; Empire
- Producers: 1WayKay; Berm; BlueStrip; Danny G Beats; Getta Beats; Helluva; Hokatiwi; Jakesand; Kid Babs; Machu; Mark Anthony; MIA Jay C; Southside Rich; StupidDogBeats; Wayne616; Yourfriendrado

BabyTron chronology
BIN Reaper 2 (2021)	Megatron (2022)	BIN Reaper 3: Old Testament (2022)

Megatron is the second studio album by the American rapper BabyTron. It was released by the Hip Hop Lab and Empire Distribution on March 4, 2022. Megatron was produced by a variety of record producers, including longtime collaborator Helluva, and contains guest appearances from GTP Daidoe, DaBoii of SOB X RBE, and Glockboyz Teejaee. All of the tracks on the album were freestyled.

Megatron is a Michigan rap album that blends popular culture and basketball references with unconventional flows over funk-inspired instrumentals. It was supported by two promotional singles—"6 Star Wanted Level" and "Chess Players"—and the Megatron Tour across the United States during April 2022. It received a positive review from HipHopDX as well as further approval from The Fader and HotNewHipHop. A sequel, Megatron 2, was released in October 2023.

== Background and production ==
BabyTron released his studio album BIN Reaper 2, a sequel to his 2019 BIN Reaper mixtape, in October 2021. He is a member of the rap group ShittyBoyz, who released their mixtape Trifecta on February 18, 2022. Megatron was produced by a variety of record producers, including Helluva, a producer BabyTron has worked with since 2019. Megatron contains guest appearances from GTP Daidoe, DaBoii of SOB X RBE, and Glockboyz Teejaee. All of the tracks on the album were freestyled. BabyTron's producers will sometimes choose the samples that he raps on, but he chose the sample from the film The Lost World: Jurassic Park (1997) featured on the album.

== Composition ==
Megatron is a Michigan rap album that contains humorous lines and references to popular culture and basketball while using an unconventional flow. Its instrumentals are unconventional and funk-inspired. HipHopDX's Jayson Buford said BabyTron's raps are "merciless like a stapler gun" and called his "boyish nasal voice" inimitable. The album contains 23 tracks, and is over an hour long. "Letter to Cornelius" showcases BabyTron boasting about having an ordinary life, subtly hinting he's a major star in his niche. "Manute Bol" and "6 Star Wanted Level" are melodic trap songs that feature a "1980s space vibe", utilizing their heavy bass. The latter also features a harsh Michigan rap instrumental and references to past events using an angsty delivery. "Beyond Turnt" has lively horns and sharp snares, while Buford said BabyTron's voice on "Mr. Do the Dash" "slithers up". "Extra Butter" contains braggadocios lyrics, and Buford likened its instrumental to a paid programming commercial. "Crocs & Wock" begins with a fake start, as if BabyTron made a mistake, until he starts his actual verse. "Chess Players" features DaBoii and showcases the two trading flows and verses on its hook, utilizing their chemistry. BabyTron titled the track "Mainstream Tron" to play on listener expectations, though he has said he does not anticipate his music becoming mainstream. The lyricism of "Hustle Junkie" pertains to guns and crimes. "December 1st" samples a pop song from Sue Ann Carwell.

== Release and reception ==
Professional ratings
Review scores
Source	Rating
HipHopDX	3.7/5

Megatron was announced alongside the release of its first promotional single "6 Star Wanted Level" on February 18, 2022. It was followed by "Chess Players" on February 25. The album was released by the Hip Hop Lab and Empire Distribution on March 4. It reached number 11 on the iTunes top Hip-Hop/Rap albums chart. To support the album, he embarked on the Megatron Tour across the United States throughout April 2022. BabyTron was added to XXL's annual "Freshman Class" list in June 2022. Megatron received a sequel, Megatron 2, on October 27, 2023.

Following its release, it received a positive review from HipHopDX. Buford wrote that the album was "an overall solid showcase of what he has to offer", and thought it shows he can help bring popularity to the Michigan rap scene. He criticized its length, believing that "the album can become too big for its specialized segment" when the "minimalist production loosens". Discussing the album for The Fader, Jordan Darville thought that for all of the attention the Detroit rap scene is receiving, "there's not another artist quite like BabyTron". Alex Zidel from HotNewHipHop believed that, to see why BabyTron has been receiving praise nationwide, listeners would need to listen to Megatron. XXL listed "Peachtree" as one of the best songs of its release week.

== Track listing ==
All tracks are written by James Johnson IV (BabyTron).

No.	Title	Producer(s)	Length
1.	"Letter to Cornelius"	Machu	3:20
2.	"Manute Bol"	BlueStrip; Wayne616	2:49
3.	"Peachtree"		2:26
4.	"Cobra Kai"	StupidDogBeats	2:18
5.	"Beyond Turnt"	Getta Beats	2:49
6.	"Huge Lifestyle 2" (featuring GTP Daidoe)	Machu	3:06
7.	"Area 51"	Machu	2:44
8.	"Mr. Do the Dash"	BlueStrip	3:09
9.	"Extra Butter"	Mark Anthony	2:25
10.	"Crocs & Wock"	Helluva	2:09
11.	"BMF"	Anthony	1:55
12.	"Chess Players" (featuring DaBoii)	Southside Rich	2:11
13.	"6 Star Wanted Level"	1WayKay; BlueStrip; Danny G Beats; Hokatiwi; Jakesand; MIA Jay C	3:50
14.	"Mainstream Tron"	Machu	2:36
15.	"Hustle Junkie"	Machu	2:49
16.	"God Tier"	Anthony	2:21
17.	"December 1st"	Machu	3:16
18.	"Hold Up, Wait!"	Kid Babs; Yourfriendrado	2:36
19.	"RIP Virgil"	Anthony	2:29
20.	"Stupid" (featuring Glockboyz Teejaee)	BlueStrip	3:06
21.	"Jerry Rice"	Machu	2:25
22.	"10 Toes Wherever"	Anthony	2:25
23.	"The Lost World"	Berm; Danny G Beats	3:21
Total length:			63:02
