= J.P. (rapper) =

American rapper and singer

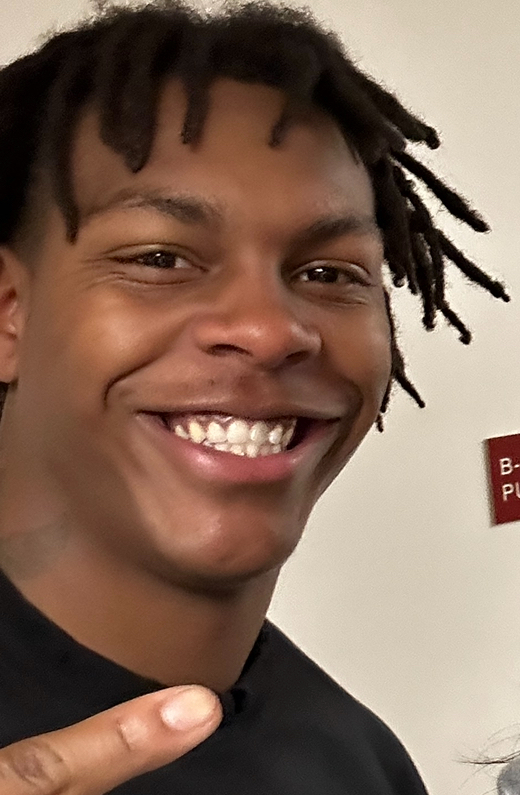
- J.P. in August 2024

Background information
- Also known as: Jody P
- Born: Josiah Lequince T. Gillie; 2003 or 2004 (age 22–23); Milwaukee, Wisconsin, U.S.
- Genre: Lowend
- Occupations: Rapper; singer
- Instrument: Vocals
- Years active: 2022–present

Josiah Gillie, known professionally as J.P. and formerly as Jody P, is an American rapper and singer. He released his debut single "Juicey Ahhh" in 2022 and his breakout single "Bad Bitty" went viral on TikTok in 2024.

== Life and career ==
Josiah Gillie was born in Milwaukee to mother Ramona Gillie. Gillie's brother Keenan-Hampton Duck works as his manager.

As a child, Gillie performed in musicals and sang jazz, opera, and in his church choir; he also played basketball and joined an Amateur Athletic Union team in eighth grade. He attended West Allis Central High School. He began making music in high school, which he described as "horrible quality". As of 2024, Gillie is attending the University of Wisconsin–Stevens Point as a music performance major with a focus on vocal performance and a minor in communications. He also plays as a power forward for the school's basketball team, the Pointers.

As a freshman at the University of Wisconsin–Stevens Point, Gillie's cousin encouraged him to try making lowend music, a style of hip hop music from Milwaukee. He recorded his first song, "Juicey Ahhh", on his phone using BandLab and a lowend beat from YouTube that was produced by Milwaukee producer DDMakinHits. He released it under the name J.P. in December 2022. The song soon went viral on TikTok after being posted by the popular Milwaukee-based TikTok account @414hypehousetiktok. After it was endorsed by rapper Lil Uzi Vert on social media in January 2023, a remix of "Juicey Ahhh" featuring Sada Baby was released. In 2023, J.P. released the song "Get Down" and his debut album, No Discounts. J.P.'s breakout single, "Bad Bitty", was released in February 2024. It went viral on TikTok and other social media platforms the following month due to the song's choreography and a meme involving the song's ad-libs. His song "Freak Girl" was released in April 2024. J.P.'s album Coming Out Party was released in June 2024.

== Musical style ==
J.P.'s music is primarily lowend, and he has described his music as a combination of lowend with R&B. He has named Otis Redding, Luther Vandross, and Derrick Simmons as musical influences. He has stated that he does not write his music and that his lyrical process is "more of a feeling-type thing".

== Discography ==
=== Studio albums ===
List of studio albums with selected details
Title	Details
Class Act	Released: November 5, 2022; Label: Self-released; Formats: Digital download, streaming
Everything Your Not	Released: January 3, 2023; Label: Self-released; Formats: Digital download, streaming
No Discounts	Released: March 18, 2023; Label: Self-released; Formats: Digital download, streaming
Highs and Lows	Released: June 29, 2023; Label: Self-released; Formats: Digital download, streaming
Coming Out Party	Released: June 7, 2024; Label: Self-released; Formats: Digital download, streaming

=== Extended plays ===
List of extended plays with selected details
Title	Details
Party Mix	Released: April 28, 2023; Label: Self-released; Formats: Digital download, streaming
Bad Guy	Released: September 26, 2023; Label: Self-released; Formats: Digital download, streaming

=== Singles ===
==== As lead artist ====
List of singles as lead artist, showing year released, chart positions, and album name
Title	Year	Peak chart positions	Album
Title	Year	US R&B/HH Air.	Album
"Juicey Ahhh" (solo or remix featuring Sada Baby)	2022	—	Non-album single
"Opp Anthem"	2022	—	Class Act
"$20 at the Door"	2022	—	Non-album single
"Show Me What You Got"	2023	—	Non-album single
"Ratchet Shit"	2023	—	Non-album single
"J.P." (Gyalis remix)	2023	—	Non-album single
"Ayoo Big Barney"	2023	—	Non-album single
"Hey Huh Bow" (featuring 414bigfrank)	2023	—	Non-album single
"Hounder" (featuring JuanieeGC)	2023	—	Non-album single
"Super Saiyan"	2023	—	Non-album single
"My Lips Are Parched"	2023	—	Non-album single
"Fast Car"	2023	—	Non-album single
"Throw It Back"	2023	—	Non-album single
"Yessir"	2024	—	Everything Your Not
"Bad Bitty"	2024	50	Non-album singles
"She Took"	2024	—	Non-album singles
"Mr Smackdown"	2024	—	Non-album singles

==== As featured artist ====
List of singles as featured artist, showing year released and album name
Title	Year	Album
"Bag" (Mayyh3m featuring J.P.)	2023	Non-album singles
"Fat Wham" (SR Rome featuring J.P.)	2023	Non-album singles
"Oh Shi" (414bigfrank featuring J.P.)	2024	Non-album singles
"Fire Bittys Come Party" (414bigfrank featuring J.P.)	2024	Non-album singles
"Jungle Fever" (Ron Suno and Zeddy Will featuring J.P.)	2024	Non-album singles

=== Guest appearances ===
List of non-single guest appearances, showing year released and album name
Title	Other artist(s)	Year	Album
"Hts Part 2"	Myaap	2023	Worth the Wait
