= Steve Wills =

American record producer

Steve "Blast" Wills
- Born: Stephen Wills
- Origin: St. Louis, Missouri, United States
- Genres: Hip hop, St. Louis Bounce
- Occupation: Record producer
- Years active: 2000–present

Steve "Blast" Wills is an American, St. Louis, Missouri, born record producer and music publisher, recognised for his production work for urban artists Nelly, Chingy and Murphy Lee. He owns the urban music publisher Blast Music Publishing. He is known as one of the originators of the "St. Louis Bounce" sound which was popularized in hip hop music and videos in the first decade of the 2000s.

== Biography ==
Wills first recognised for his production skills when, at the age of 14, he produced demos for two local acts that went on to win first and second place in a high school talent show. His contribution to their success was acknowledged when the winning two groups thanked Wills on stage in front of over 2,500 people. After that Wills became the "go-to guy for production and songs".

The name 'Blast' came from when a local group Wills regularly worked with publicly gave props to "Stevie Blast" for the "explosive" tracks he had just created for them.

Wills has said that his chief ambition was not to be a famous producer but a wealthy businessman, telling HitQuarters, "I always wanted to be ... the guy with the mansion and the yacht." At the start of his career the business he planned to make his fortune from was music publishing.

As "businessmen that pioneered eras of urban music with no blueprint and still found success and acceptance", Wills credits L.A. Reid, Russell Simmons and Berry Gordy as inspirational figures on his career.

In 2000, Wills produced the single "Batter Up" for Nelly's Billboard 200 topping debut album Country Grammar.
