= Lowend =

Music genre

- Other names: Low-end
- Stylistic origins: Bounce; ratchet; twerk music; hyphy; jerk
- Cultural origins: 2020s, Milwaukee, Wisconsin, U.S.

Lowend is a subgenre of Milwaukee hip-hop that originated in Milwaukee in the 2020s. Defined by uptempo, metronome-like clapping rhythms, heavy bass, and snares, it was pioneered by artists such as Certified Trapper and AyooLii. The genre found wider national success through the virality of J.P.'s songs "Juicey Ahhh" and "Bad Bitty" on TikTok in 2023 and 2024, respectively, by which point it had begun receiving attention from music-focused media outlets such as Pitchfork.

== Characteristics ==
Lowend is defined primarily by a steady, metronome-like rhythm of synthesized eighth note handclaps, as well as snares on the first and third counts of its beats, rumbling bass, fast tempos, and brief runtimes, typically not exceeding two minutes in length. Lowend beats are also known for being danceable and relatively minimalistic, while lyrics in lowend songs generally focus on partying, twerking, and cars. It takes influence from other hip-hop genres such as bounce, ratchet, hyphy, and twerk music.

== History ==
Following the local success of Detroit hip-hop-influenced Milwaukee rappers like Mari Boy Mula Mar, Chicken P, and MT Twins in the late 2010s and Milwaukee rapper Lakeyah's signing to Quality Control in 2020, lowend first arose in the city's lower east side, also known colloquially as the "lowends" for its street numbers being the lowest in the city. Certified Trapper, who has been described as the genre's "standout star", began releasing lowend music in 2020. "Like Yhop" by Esco and Shawn P, which heavily utilizes a sample of Natasha Bedingfield's song "Unwritten", was released in March 2021 and became one of the first notable lowend songs. Big Wan, an early figure in lowend, was shot and killed in November 2021 at 19 years old.

Lowend first rose to popularity on TikTok with the viral success of J.P.'s lowend song "Juicey Ahhh" in 2023. His 2024 lowend song "Bad Bitty" was described by Piet Levy of the Milwaukee Journal Sentinel as "the biggest hit from a Milwaukee-based rapper since 2001, and possibly ever" and preceded his signing to Roc Nation. Other lowend artists, including SteveDaStoner, 414BigFrank, and AyooLii, all of whom became popular on TikTok through dance and comedy videos, and women rappers such as Myaap, Lonni Monae, and Yonaa have also been considered instrumental to its rise.

Lowend began receiving media attention in late 2022 and early 2023, with articles from Rolling Stone and on Pitchfork discussing its merits. By 2023, lowend artists became known for their extensive and rapid musical outputs. In early 2024, Nadine Smith wrote for The Fader that lowend had become "one of the most inventive and hyper-active rap scenes in the country", while Alphonse Pierre of Pitchfork called it "low-stakes, low-budget, high comedy dance rap" that was "heavily rooted it is in specific, hyperlocal Milwaukee sounds of the past".
