= Yndi Ferreira Da Silva =

French-Brazilian producer, songwriter and singer (born 1993)

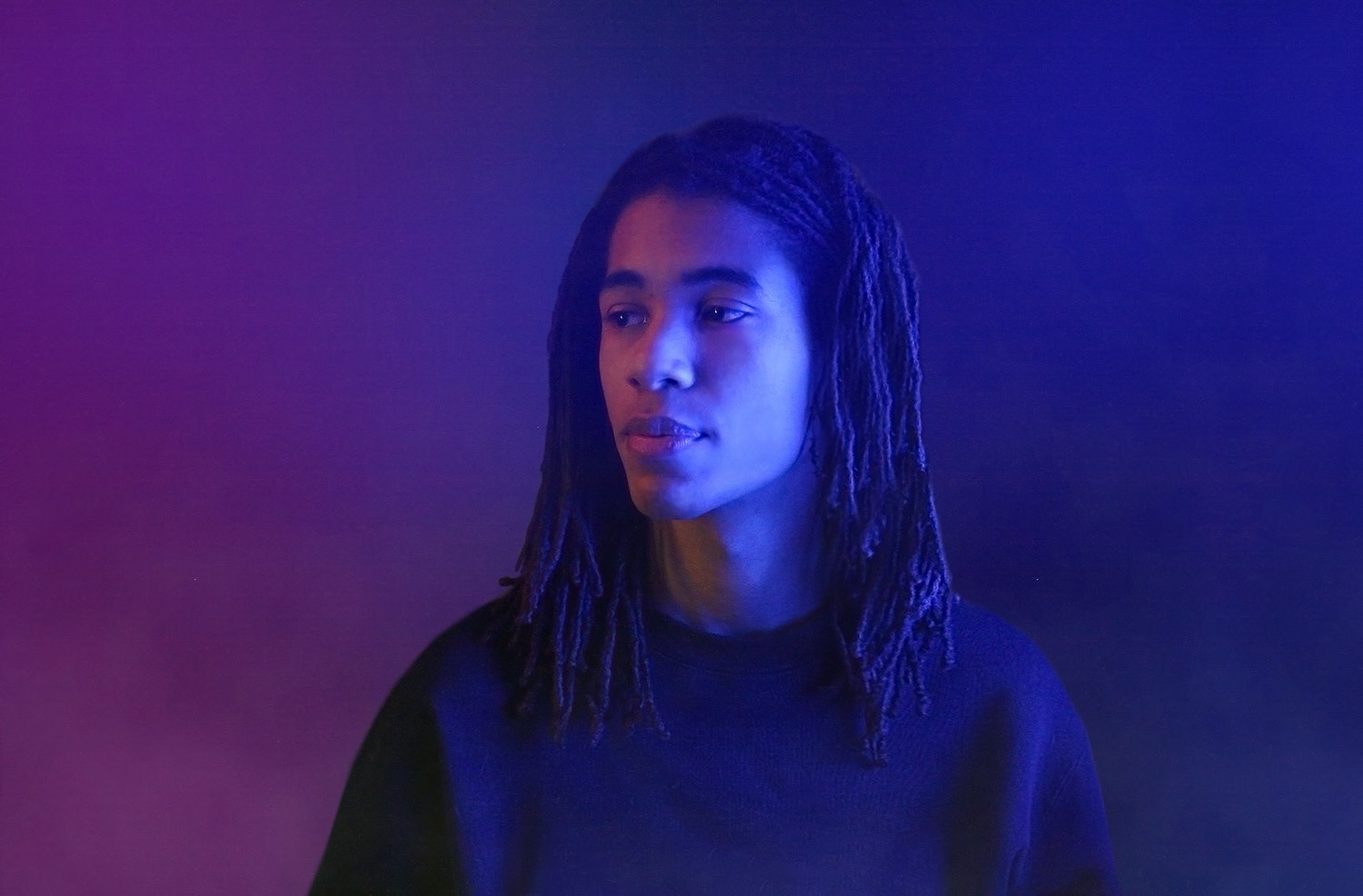
- Da Silva in 2014.

Background information
- Also known as: Dream Koala, YNDI
- Born: Yndi Ferreira Da Silva; 18 May 1994 (age 31); Paris, France
- Genres: Electropop, Electronic R&B, Afro-Brazilian music
- Occupations: Producer, Songwriter, Singer
- Instrument: Guitar

Yndi Ferreira Da Silva (born 1994), formerly known under the stage name Dream Koala, is a trans French-Brazilian producer, songwriter, and singer.

== Biography ==
Yndi was born to Brazilian parents in Paris, France, on 18 May 1994. Without any formal music education, she started making music and taught herself to play the guitar at the age of fourteen. Yndi began publishing her music in 2012 under the name "Dream Koala" when she was living in Berlin, Germany. After transitioning, Yndi released music under her own name, "YNDI", in 2021.

== Music ==
Yndi's music is described as melancholic electropop, incorporating different style of music, from electronic R&B to Afro-Brazilian music.

=== Dream Koala ===
In 2012, Dream Koala released their first single "We Can't Be Friends", followed by their first EP "Earth.Home.Destroyed" released on 7 May 2014. As Dream Koala, Yndi produced mainly instrumental, and some English-lyric songs. Dream Koala gained further publicity when Doja Cat released the song "No Police" in 2014, which sampled "We Can't Be Friends". Critics classified Dream Koala's music as a "dystopian soundscape", comparing her voice to Sade and FKA Twigs.

=== YNDI ===
In 2021, Yndi released her first album "Noir Brésil" ("Black Brazil") under her real name. Yndi switched to French and Portuguese lyrics, touching on subjects more closely related to her heritage. She gained popularity online through her performance of "Ailleurs" for the COLORS Show in January 2021, and again for "Amazona" in April of the same year. Yndi also engages in visual art in her music videos, which she claims to be inspired by video games and cinema.
