= Myaap =

- Born: Amaiya Spain; May 4, 2006 (age 20); Milwaukee, Wisconsin, U.S.
- Genre: Lowend
- Occupation: Rapper
- Instrument: Vocals
- Years active: 2022–present

Amaiya Spain (born May 4, 2006), known professionally as Myaap, is an American rapper. Born and raised in Milwaukee, she began rapping while in high school and her 2023 singles "HTS" and "Getting to It" both went viral on TikTok.

== Career ==
Amaiya Spain was born on May 4, 2006 in Milwaukee, Wisconsin and has three siblings. Before rapping professionally, she would casually freestyle with her older brother. She also took dance lessons in Milwaukee and worked at McDonald's, Gap, and Walmart, with aspirations of working as a mortician or as a backup dancer. Myaap began rapping in 2023 while attending Lynde & Harry Bradley Technology and Trade School, recording songs at Milwaukee's Hi-Five Studios. She posted her songs "HTS" and "Party Crackin'" on TikTok, both of which went viral on the platform in 2023 and 2024, respectively. Her 2023 song "Getting to It", which was released in November with a music video and heavily samples the 1976 ABBA song "Dancing Queen", also became popular on TikTok due to a dance associated with the song. It was used in videos by Meghan Trainor, Coco Jones, and Reneé Rapp before being removed from YouTube and streaming platforms due to its sample of "Dancing Queen" being uncleared by Universal Music Group.

Myaap's extended play (EP) Big Myaap, Not the Little One was released in January 2024. The following month, Myaap began performing as an opening act throughout Veeze's Ganger Tour. Later in 2024, she released the collaborative extended play Yop! with producer Nedarb on May 31 and the singles "Crunch Time" and "Wrist Buss" in August and September, respectively. By November 2024, she had released a total of four projects. As of 2024, she is based in Atlanta.

In 2025, Myapp released her new single "Fairy."

== Musical style ==
Myaap's music is lowend, a style of Milwaukee hip hop music defined by heavy 808 drums and handclaps, with Piet Levy of the Milwaukee Journal Sentinel calling her a "chief ambassador" of the genre. She is also known for incorporating Milwaukee dance moves into her performances. She has stated that she makes songs intended for online virality and writes her songs on her phone. She has listed Milwaukee rappers such as, Chicken P, and Coo Coo Cal as her musical inspirations.

== Discography ==
=== Mixtapes ===
List of mixtapes, with selected details
Title	Mixtape details
Worth the Wait	Released: July 28, 2023; Label: Self-released; Format: Digital download, streaming
The Bigger Picture	Released: December 20, 2024; Label: Self-released; Format: Digital download, streaming

=== Extended plays ===
List of extended plays, with selected details
Title	Mixtape details
No Guarantee Vol. 1	Released: April 20, 2023; Label: Self-released; Format: Digital download, streaming
Big Myaap, Not the Little One	Released: January 26, 2024; Label: Self-released; Format: Digital download, streaming
Yop! (with Nedarb)	Released: May 31, 2024; Label: Self-released; Format: Digital download, streaming

=== Singles ===
==== As lead artist ====
List of singles as lead artist, with year released and album
Title	Year	Album
"Get In Mode" (with Èsco)	2022	Non-album singles
"Party Crackin" (with Ke Lo)	2022	Non-album singles
"Lowend Christmas"	2023	Non-album singles
"HTS"	2023	Non-album singles
"Do Yo Shi" (with Miah P)	2023	Non-album singles
"First Place"	2023	Non-album singles
"Woahh"	2023	Non-album singles
"Wham" (featuring Lil RB)	2023	Non-album singles
"Dakota"	2023	Non-album singles
"Check the Stats" (with Certified Trapper)	2023	Non-album singles
"Big Mad"	2023	Non-album singles
"Back It Up" (with Mariboy Mula Mar)	2023	Non-album singles
"Getting to It"	2023	Non-album singles
"I'm Leaving"	2023	Non-album singles
"Wine 4 Em"	2023	Non-album singles
"I Ain't Hidin (featuring Mg Sleepy)	2024	Big Myaap, Not the Little One
"Actin Up" (with Chicken P)	2024	Non-album single
"Rotation" (with Nedarb)	2024	Yop!
"Show Me Money"	2024	Non-album singles
"From the Front	2024	Non-album singles
"Crunch Time"	2024	Non-album singles
"Wrist Buss"	2024	Non-album singles
"Dripping" (with 414Jungle Baby)	2024	Non-album singles
"Michael Myers	2024	Non-album singles
"Trick or Treat"	2024	Non-album singles
"Wait"	2024	Non-album singles

==== As featured artist ====
List of singles as featured artist, with year released and album
Title	Year	Album
"Let Me Bam" (54 Baby Trey featuring Myaap)	2023	Non-album singles
"On My Daddy" (AyooLii featuring Myaap)	2023	Non-album singles
"Projectz" (Yonaa featuring Chicken P & Myaap)	2024	YonaaThon

=== Guest appearances ===
List of guest appearances, with year released, other artist(s), and album name shown
Title	Year	Other artist(s)	Album
"Do That"	2023	Munch Lauren	April Fool
"Hood Rat"	2023	Mariboy Mula Mar	Just Getting Started
"Set the Play"	2023	Certified Trapper	Deep End
"Paint the Town Red"	2023	Mg Sleepy	Hit Different
"Bill Belichick"	2024	Mg Sleepy	I Just Woke Up Vol. 2
"Shut It Up"	2024	Mg Sleepy	I Just Woke Up Vol. 2
