= Certified Trapper =

American rapper and record producer (born 2001)

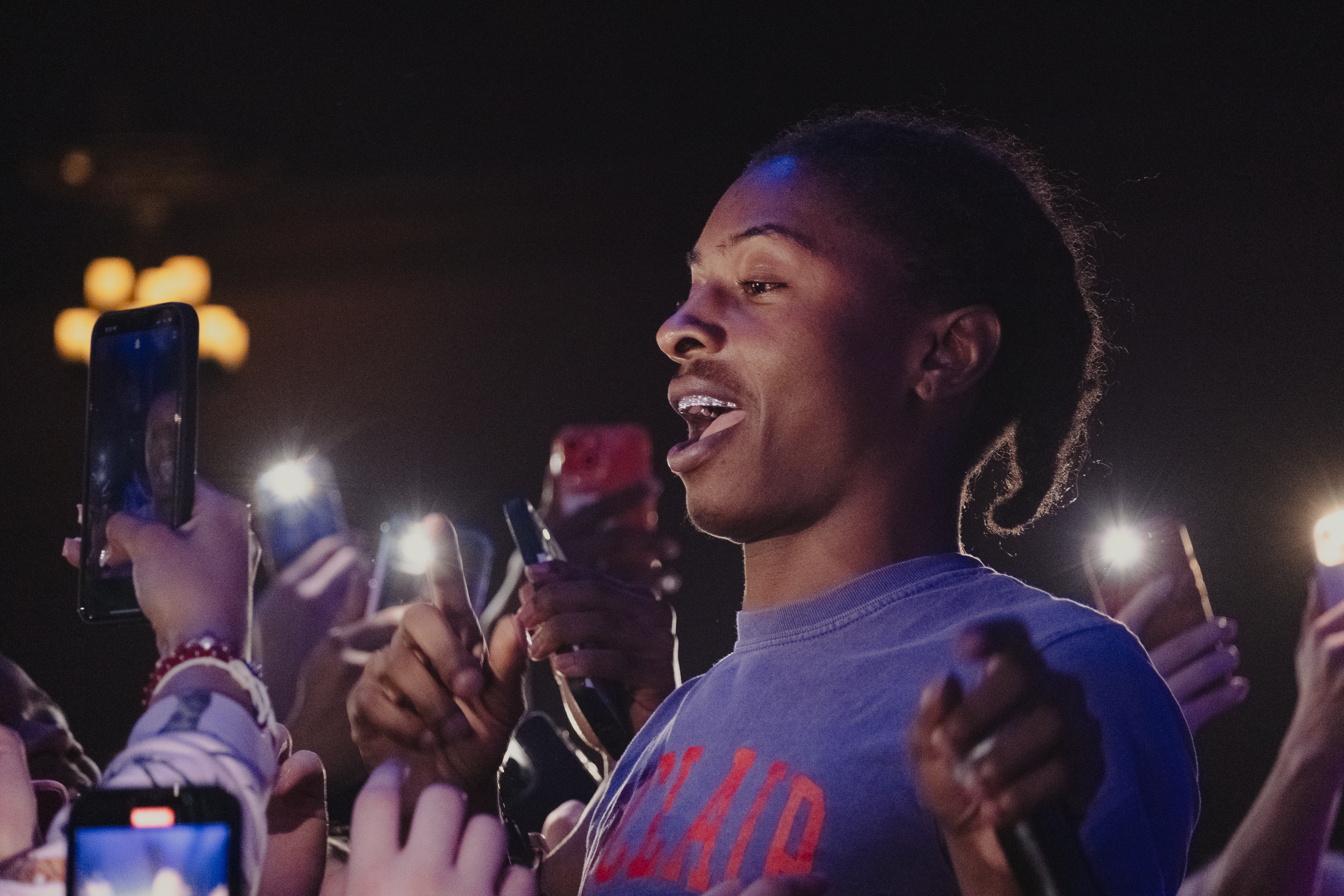
- Graham during a performance in 2024

Background information
- Also known as: Lotta Guwopp
- Born: Daishun Graham; July 16, 2001 (age 25); Milwaukee, Wisconsin, US
- Genres: Lowend; rage; trap; hoodtrap
- Occupations: Rapper; record producer; songwriter
- Years active: 2010–present
- Labels: Signal Records; Stretch Gang Entertainment; Columbia Records

Daishun Graham (born 2001), known by his stage name Certified Trapper, is an American rapper and record producer. He is known for being a pioneer of lowend music and his eccentric personality and style. In 2022, Graham signed to Signal Records, an imprint of Columbia Records.

== Early life ==
Graham grew up on Milwaukee's east side and first started experimenting with music at the age of 9. He originally began rapping under the name Lotta Guwopp and released his first track titled "Free da guys intro" in 2016. He attended Milwaukee Area Technical College where he studied audio production.

== Career ==
In 2022, Graham signed to Signal Records, an imprint of Columbia Records founded by Jeff Vaughn. Graham produced the track "Long Nights" from the BabyTron EP Out on Bond. Graham performed in Rolling Loud California alongside BabyTron in March 2023.

== Style ==
Certified Trapper is a pioneer of lowend music and a popular figure in the Milwaukee hip-hop scene. Most of his music distinctly features "clap-style" beats, having 1 clap per beat, regardless of the beats per minute. Like many lowend artists, his music features heavy baselines. His style is influenced by New Orleans style bounce music, which features similar fast-paced beats and claps.
