= BabyTron =

American rapper (born 2000)

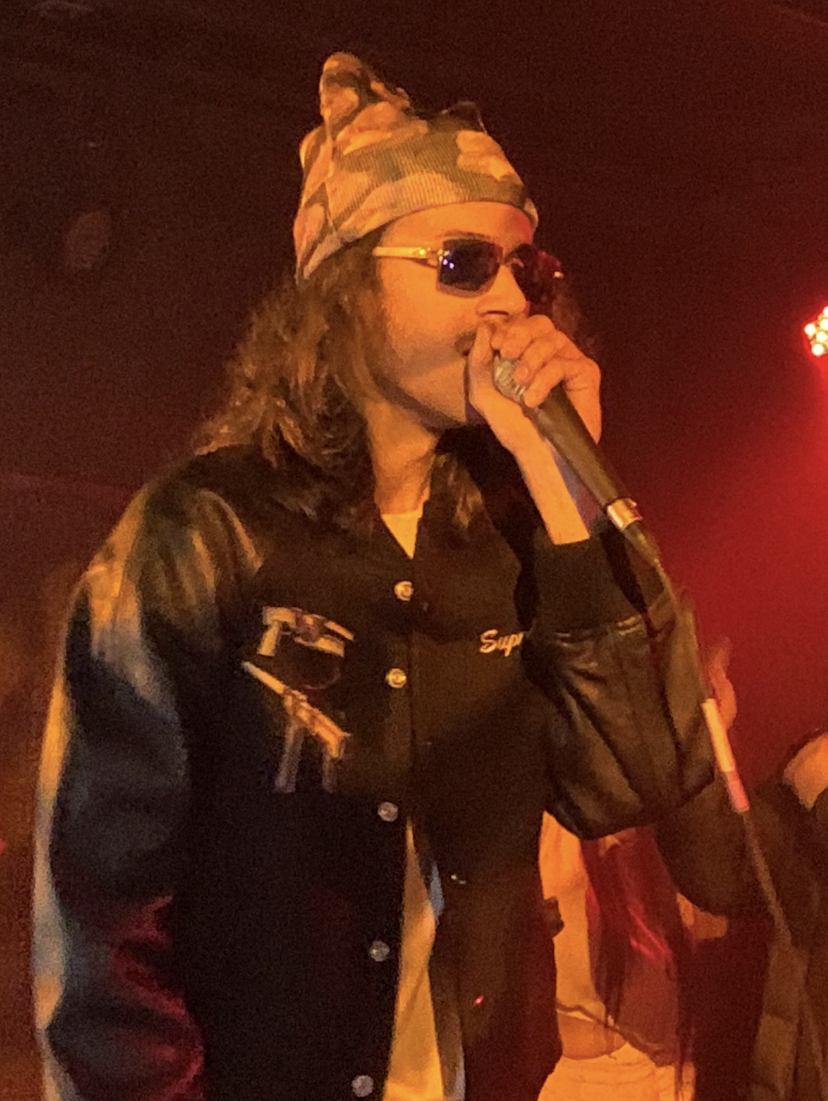
- BabyTron performing in April 2022

Background information
- Born: James Edward Johnson IV; June 6, 2000 (age 26); Ypsilanti, Michigan, U.S.
- Genres: Michigan rap; trap; scam rap; gangsta rap; jerk; lowend
- Occupations: Rapper; songwriter
- Years active: 2017–present
- Labels: Empire; The Hip Hop Lab
- Member of: ShittyBoyz; Dog$hit Militia

James Edward Johnson IV (born June 6, 2000), better known by his stage name BabyTron, is an American rapper and songwriter. He is a member of the hip hop group ShittyBoyz. Born and raised in Ypsilanti, Michigan, he rose to prominence in the Detroit rap scene following the release of his 2019 mixtape BIN Reaper, which included the song "Jesus Shuttlesworth", which went viral.

In 2022, BabyTron released his studio album Megatron. That same year, he also released the mixtapes Lewis & Clark and Dookie Brothers 2 with TrDee. He released his mixtape series BIN Reaper 2 (2021) and BIN Reaper 3: Old Testament (2022), followed by BIN Reaper 3: New Testament (2023). His collaborative mixtape with artist Certified Trapper, Mario & Luigi, released in 2024.

BabyTron was named as part of the XXL 2022 Freshman Class on June 14, 2022, being featured in a XXL freestyle rap cypher. In 2024, BabyTron was featured on the song "Equilibrium" alongside G Herbo for Lyrical Lemonade's album All Is Yellow. During the same year, BabyTron, alongside Big Sean, was featured on Eminem's song "Tobey", which was the second single for his album The Death of Slim Shady (Coup de Grâce).

== Early life and education ==
James Edward Johnson IV was born on June 6, 2000, in Ypsilanti, Michigan. He attended Lincoln High School and graduated in 2018.

== Career ==
=== 2017–2021: Early career, BIN Reaper and BIN Reaper 2 ===
BabyTron began taking music seriously at age 16, alongside childhood friends TrDee and StanWill, and they established the rap trio ShittyBoyz while in high school. BabyTron would also consistently release solo songs and mixtapes on streaming platforms. He released his first official mixtape, Different Breed, on 2017. Two years later, he released his debut mixtape, BIN Reaper, which featured the track "Jesus Shuttlesworth", which became viral within the hip hop community, with a variety of memes spawning from the track. In 2020, he released his first album, Sleeve Nash, followed by Back to the Future. In 2021, he would feature on the Lil Yachty song "Hybrid", taken from the latter's Michigan Boy Boat mixtape and released two solo and two collaborative mixtapes in the same year. BabyTron's October 2021 BIN Reaper 2 mixtape had features from Lil Yachty and Miles Bridges (credited as RTB MB).

=== 2022–present: MegaTron and BIN Reaper 3 ===
BabyTron gained traction in 2022 through his series of tracks that feature him rapping on a multitude of popular beats in one song. This began with "Prince of the Mitten" in January and was followed up with "King of the Galaxy" later that month. BabyTron released the albums Megatron and 6 in 2022, through Empire Distribution and The Hip Hop Lab. His song "Emperor of the Universe" was released on May 17, 2022, and featured a music video directed by Cole Bennett. He was named as part of the XXL 2022 Freshman Class on June 14, 2022, being featured in a XXL freestyle rap cypher.

On August 2, his single "Blah Blah Blah" with TrDee was released. ShittyBoyz' second mixtape, Trifecta 2, was released on August 5, 2022. On September 19, BabyTron announced his seventh mixtape, BIN Reaper 3. On October 28, 2022, BIN Reaper 3: Old Testament released, peaking at number 69 on the Billboard 200, his first entry on the chart.

On January 5, 2023, BabyTron announced his eighth mixtape, BIN Reaper 3: New Testament. The album includes features from Lil Yachty, Babyface Ray and Cordae. New Testament acts as a sequel to BIN Reaper 3: Old Testament. The album was released on January 13, 2023, and peaked at number 100 on the Billboard 200.

Following his arrest on February 8, 2023, BabyTron surprise released the EP Out on Bond on February 24, which he followed up with his fifth album, MegaTron 2.

On February 24, 2024, he released his ninth mixtape, Case Dismissed. In July of that year, BabyTron was featured on the Eminem single "Tobey" along with Big Sean from the album The Death of Slim Shady (Coup de Grâce). On November 8, 2024, he released his sixth album Tronicles.

== Group career ==
Along with StanWill and TrDee, he is a member of rap group ShittyBoyz. He is also a member of Dog$hit Militia (D$M), a rap group featuring JuSleaze, MJPaid, Fordio, 72 Reezy, Beannskii, StanWill, Trdee, and $camaurion, until $camaurion's death. He frequently refers to the two groups combined as "SBD$M" in his lyrics.

== Legal issues ==
On February 8, 2023, Johnson was pulled over and arrested after a police officer conducted a search of his vehicle, finding marijuana, marijuana edibles, psilocybin mushroom edibles, and a 9mm handgun. He was booked into Dawson County Jail in Lexington, Nebraska, for Possession of a Controlled Substance. He was released after posting 10% of a $15,000 bond.

== Discography ==
=== Studio albums ===
List of albums, with selected details and chart positions
Title	Studio album details	Peak chart positions
Title	Studio album details	US
BIN Reaper 2	Released: October 29, 2021; Label: Empire, The Hip Hop Lab; Format: Digital download, streaming	—
Megatron	Released: March 4, 2022; Label: Empire, The Hip Hop Lab; Format: Digital download, streaming	—
BIN Reaper 3: Old Testament	Released: October 28, 2022; Label: Empire, The Hip Hop Lab; Format: Digital download, streaming, vinyl record	69
BIN Reaper 3: New Testament	Released: January 13, 2023; Label: Empire, The Hip Hop Lab; Format: Digital download, streaming, vinyl record	100
6	Released: June 6, 2023; Label: Empire, The Hip Hop Lab; Format: Digital download, streaming	—
MegaTron 2	Released: October 27, 2023; Label: Empire, The Hip Hop Lab; Format: Digital download, streaming	110
Tronicles	Released: November 8, 2024; Label: Empire, The Hip Hop Lab; Format: Digital download, streaming	—
Luka Troncic 2	Released: August 1, 2025; Label: Empire, The Hip Hop Lab; Format: Digital download, streaming	—
Out On Bond Again	Released: February 27, 2026; Label: Empire, The Hip Hop Lab; Format: Digital download, streaming	

=== Mixtapes ===
List of mixtapes, with selected details
Title	Mixtape details
BIN Reaper	Released: October 30, 2019; Label: Empire, The Hip Hop Lab; Format: Digital download, streaming
Sleeve Nash	Released: October 31, 2020; Label: Empire, The Hip Hop Lab; Format: Digital download, streaming
Back to the Future	Released: December 2, 2020; Label: Empire, The Hip Hop Lab; Format: Digital download, streaming
Lewis & Clark	Released: January 1, 2021; Label: The Hip Hop Lab; Format: Digital download, streaming
Dookie Brothers 2 (with TrDee)	Released: May 21, 2021; Label: The Hip Hop Lab; Format: Digital download, streaming
Luka Troncic	Released: June 6, 2021; Label: Empire, The Hip Hop Lab; Format: Digital download, streaming
Case Dismissed	Released: February 23, 2024; Label: Empire, The Hip Hop Lab; Format: Digital download, streaming
Mario & Luigi (with Certified Trapper)	Released: July 9, 2024; Label: Empire, The Hip Hop Lab; Format: Digital download, streaming, vinyl record

=== Extended plays ===
List of EPs, with selected details
Title	EP details
Different Breed	Released: October 25, 2017; Label: Self-released; Format: Digital download, streaming
Pre-Game	Released: August 6, 2020; Label: Empire, The Hip Hop Lab; Format: Digital download, streaming
Shitty Bronx (with BandGang Biggs)	Released: December 18, 2020; Label: Empire, The Hip Hop Lab; Format: Digital download, streaming
Dookie Brothers (with TrDee)	Released: February 5, 2021; Label: Empire, The Hip Hop Lab; Format: Digital download, streaming
They Won't Clear This	Released: December 1, 2022; Label: Empire, The Hip Hop Lab; Format: Digital download, streaming
Out on Bond	Released: February 24, 2023; Label: Empire, The Hip Hop Lab; Format: Digital download, streaming
International Juggaholics (with AK Bandamont)	Released: September 30, 2024; Label: Self-released; Format: Digital download, streaming
Song Wars	Released: January 31, 2025; Label: Empire, The Hip Hop Lab; Format: Digital download, streaming

=== Charted and certified singles ===
Title	Year	Peak chart positions										Certifications	Album
Title	Year	US	US R&B/HH	AUS	CAN	IRE	NZ	SWE	SWI	UK	WW	Certifications	Album
"Half Doin Dope" (with JID featuring Lil Yachty)	2023	—	—	—	—	—	— (Note: "Half Doin Dope" did not enter the NZ Top 40 Singles Chart, but peaked at number 36 on the NZ Hot Singles Chart.)	—	—	—	—		BlakkBoyz present Half Doin Dope/Van Gogh
"#Certified" (solo or remix featuring DJ Ess)	2023	—	—	—	—	—	—	—	—	—	—	RIAA: Gold	MegaTron 2
"Tobey" (with Eminem and Big Sean)	2024	24	7	29	21	43	25	74	31	29	23	MC: Gold	The Death of Slim Shady (Coup de Grâce)

=== Other certified songs ===
Title	Year	Certifications	Album
"Out on Bond"	2023	RIAA: Gold	Out on Bond
