= Country Grammar =

Studio album by Nelly
- Released: June 27, 2000
- Recorded: 1999–2000
- Studios: Unique Recording Studios, New York City
- Genres: Hip hop; pop rap
- Length: 66:35
- Labels: Fo' Reel; Universal
- Producers: Jason "Jay E" Epperson; City Spud; Steve "Blast" Wills; Basement Beats

Nelly chronology
Country Grammar (2000)	Nellyville (2002)

Singles from Country Grammar
- 1. "Country Grammar (Hot Shit)" Released: February 29, 2000; 2. "E.I." Released: October 17, 2000; 3. "Ride wit Me" Released: February 13, 2001; 4. "Batter Up" Released: July 10, 2001

Country Grammar is the debut studio album by American rapper and singer Nelly. It was released on June 27, 2000, by Universal Records. The production on the album was handled by Jason "Jay E" Epperson, with additional production by C-Love, Kevin Law, City Spud, Steve "Blast" Wills and Basement Beats. Nelly contributed to all lyrics on the album, with Epperson and City Spud also contributing. With the album's release, Nelly and his "St. Lunatics" crew cemented the St. Louis sound firmly amongst other southern hip hop artists in the year 2000, such as Juvenile, Trina, Ludacris, OutKast, Three 6 Mafia and UGK. Country Grammar also introduced the world to Nelly's unique musical style of pop-rap and radio "singalongs" with a Missouri twang. It was supported by four successful singles: "Country Grammar (Hot Shit)", "E.I.", "Ride wit Me" and "Batter Up". Its lead single, "Country Grammar (Hot Shit)", peaked at number 7 on the Billboard Hot 100 and UK Singles Chart. Its second single "E.I." peaked at number 16 on the Hot 100, number 12 on the UK Singles Chart and number 11 on the ARIA Singles Chart. "Ride wit Me" peaked within the top five on the Hot 100, ARIA Singles Chart, Irish Singles Chart and UK Singles Chart. The album's fourth and final single, "Batter Up" featuring St. Lunatics members Murphy Lee and Ali, achieved moderate chart success.

Country Grammar received positive reviews, with critics praising Nelly's vocal style and the album's production. It topped the US Billboard 200 chart for five consecutive weeks, and the US Top R&B/Hip-Hop Albums chart for six consecutive weeks. It peaked in the top five on the New Zealand Albums Chart and Australian Albums Chart, as well as the top ten on the Canadian Albums Chart and Dutch Albums Chart. The album was certified three times platinum by the Recording Industry Association of New Zealand (RIANZ) and Music Canada (MC). The former denoted shipments of 45,000 copies while the latter denoted 300,000 copies.

In 2016, Country Grammar became the ninth hip hop album to be certified Diamond by the Recording Industry Association of America (RIAA), denoting shipment of 10 million copies in the US. Its commercial success secured Nelly's status as one of the most successful hip hop acts of the 2000s decade. On Billboard's decade-end chart, Nelly ranked as the third most successful act of the 2000s decade, due largely to the success of Country Grammar and his follow-up album Nellyville (2002).

== Background and production ==
In his early years, Nelly frequently moved locations around the United States, before residing in the city of St. Louis, Missouri. It was there where he discovered rap artists synonymous inside the city. In his teenage years, Nelly moved to University City, a suburb of St. Louis, where he shifted his aspirations from becoming a baseball player to producing stories and rhymes. Along with some friends from high school: Ali Jones, Torhi "Murphy Lee" Harper, Kyjuan and Lavell "City Spud" Webb, Nelly formed the group St. Lunatics in 1993. Frustrated by the lack of attention from record companies, the group formed the consensus to allow Nelly to pursue a solo career, while Ali and Murphy Lee released their own solo albums. Nelly produced demos, which were sent to national labels, eventually gaining attention from Universal Records who signed a record deal with Nelly and the St. Lunatics in 1999, with Universal releasing the former's debut album, Country Grammar, in 2000. All songs on Country Grammar were recorded by Steve Eigner, and mixed by Rich Travali. Kenny Dykstra provided recording assistance and Jason Standard assisted in mixing. Mastering was performed by Herb Powers, with A&R directed by Kevin Law and Coordinated by Craig Yoskowitz. Management was provided by Tony Davis and Courtney Benson, with legality handled by Todd Rubenstein. Creative direction was handled by Sandra Brummels, with design done by BENTO Design and photography done by Jonathen Mannion. backup dancing (Michelle Moore)

== Composition ==
Much of Nelly's rap style draws from his origins, as it contains Southern drawl with Midwestern, Missouri twang, that incorporates both country and urban styles. In conjunction, Nelly approaches a pop-rap singalong vocal style, which AllMusic's Jason Birchmeier notes present within Country Grammar's tracks including "Ride wit Me" and "E.I.". Peter Shapiro described Nelly's singing and rapping as using "unforgettable hooks based on schoolyard songs, double-dutch chants, and nonsense rhymes". Much of Country Grammar's tracks are bass-heavy, that are primarily Southern hip-hop based and minimalistic. In the album's self-titled track, Nelly's vocals are slurred and slow, and are a "smooth, slippery-fast instrument" with "reggae inflections". Rolling Stone journalist Kris Ex found the song's lyrics to depict Nelly "riding around town in an expensive SUV with an assault weapon". "Ride wit Me" is a rap and pop crossover that samples DeBarge's 1982 song "I Like It", and its lyrics feature Nelly introspecting. Ex found the chorus of "E.I." to contain the vocal style of rapper The Notorious B.I.G. "Luven Me" samples "Don't Stop (Ever Loving Me)" by One Way and "Whatever You Want" by Tony! Toni! Toné!. Steve Sutherland of NME interpreted "Luven Me" as a "virtual rewrite" of rapper Tupac Shakur's 1995 "Dear Mama".

== Singles ==
"Country Grammar" was released as the album's first single on February 29, 2000, in the US. The song was written by Nelly and Jason "Jay E" Epperson, and produced by the latter. Its lyrics are based on the children clapping game Down Down Baby. "Country Grammar (Hot Shit)" peaked at number seven on the US Billboard Hot 100 and the UK Singles Chart. It also reached number ten on the Canadian Hot 100 and twenty on ARIA Singles Chart. The song was certified gold by the Recording Industry Association of America (RIAA) and Australian Recording Industry Association (ARIA). The second single, "E.I.", was written by Nelly and Epperson and produced by the latter. It reached number sixteen on the Hot 100, number eleven on the UK Singles Chart and number twelve on the ARIA Singles Chart. It was certified gold by the ARIA.

Written by Nelly and Epperson and produced by the latter, "Ride wit Me" was released as Country Grammar's third single. The track features City Spud, and reached number three on the Hot 100, the highest-charting song from Country Grammar in the US. It also peaked at number three on the UK Singles chart, number four on the ARIA Singles Chart, Irish Singles Chart, number five on the Dutch Singles Chart and number seven on the Norwegian Singles Chart. It was certified gold by the RIAA and platinum by the ARIA. "Batter Up" was released as the fourth and final single from the album. It features Murphy Lee and Ali, and was written by Nelly, Epperson and Steve "Blast" Wills, while being produced by Wills. "Batter Up" peaked at number eight on the Belgian Singles Chart (Flanders) and number nineteen on the ARIA Singles Chart.

== Critical reception ==
Professional ratings
Review scores
Source	Rating
AllMusic	3/5 stars
Entertainment Weekly	B−
Los Angeles Times	3/4 stars
NME	9/10
Pitchfork	8.1/10
Q	4/5 stars
Rolling Stone	3.5/5 stars
The Source	3.5/5 stars
Spin	6/10
The Village Voice	B+

Country Grammar received acclaim by music critics. Steve Sutherland lauded the album in his review for NME, praising Nelly's utilization of vocal characteristics from other rap artists, including Tupac Shakur and Cypress Hill. Sutherland described the album as a "rarity", noting stand-out tracks such as the "seductive rap/pop crossover" "Ride wit Me", while likening "Batter Up" to "DMX with a humour infusion". He closed his review declaring Country Grammar as "album of the year". While writing that Country Grammar demonstrates that "tiresome rap topics" are not restricted to "the coasts", Entertainment Weekly's David Browne highlighted Nelly's "smooth, slippery-fast" voice, as well as the album's "appealingly minimalist tracks" and "introspective moments" such as "Ride wit Me".

In The Village Voice, Robert Christgau wrote that Nelly presents an "easy mix of N.O. Bounce, Cleveland thug harmony, and L.A. tweedle-twaddle", finding that Nelly's heavy accent makes his hedonism more accessible. People noted that Nelly implements his own "laid-back charm" to Country Grammar's southern hip hop, and that while he shows "limited thematic vocabulary", he articulates escapism to compensate for this. AllMusic's Jason Birchmeier praised the album's "tongue-twisting" self-titled track as "infectious", noting other tracks to contain the same elements, including "Ride wit Me" and "E.I.". Birchmeier wrote that the album transcends regional styles such as southern hip hop to appeal to rap-pop audiences, while praising producer Jason "Jay E" Epperson's contribution to the album.

Reviewing Country Grammar for Rolling Stone, Kris Ex wrote that the album's "liquid bass bumps" interlope well with Nelly's "wordplay-heavy sing-song rhyme-flow", while declaring Country Grammar to be "the best thing to come out of St. Louis" since comedian Redd Foxx. At the 2001 Soul Train Music Awards, Country Grammar earned Nelly the award for Best R&B/Soul or Rap New Artist. Nelly was nominated for four awards at the Online Hip-Hop Awards, for Favorite Music Video, Song of the Year (both for "E.I."), Album of the Year (for Country Grammar) and Outstanding Graphic Design for his official website. He won the awards for Song of the Year and Artist of the Year.

== Commercial performance ==
Country Grammar entered the Billboard 200 on the week of July 15, 2000, at number 3, selling 235,000 copies. The album remained within the top 10 for several weeks before topping it on the week of August 17, 2000, selling 235,000 copies and passing 1.5 million in sales that week. Entertainment Weekly put the album's sales down to its support by its lead single, "Country Grammar (Hot Shit)", as well as the lack of releases from other music artists during that period. The album sold 235,000 copies again the following week, continuing to stay atop the Billboard 200. Country Grammar topped US Top R&B/Hip-Hop Albums chart for six consecutive weeks. On October 30, 2000, the album had sold three million copies, and was certified three-times platinum by the Recording Industry Association of America (RIAA), denoting shipments of three million copies. On June 29, 2002, Country Grammar had sold 7.7 million copies, according to Nielsen SoundScan. On July 21, 2016, the album was certified Diamond by the RIAA, denoting shipment of ten million copies in the US.

Country Grammar entered the New Zealand Albums Chart on the week of September 24, 2000, at number 5. It reached its peak at number 3, for twenty-eight weeks after its debut on the chart, where it remained there for two non-consecutive weeks. It stayed on the chart for forty-two weeks before dropping out. The album was certified Triple Platinum by the Recording Industry Association of New Zealand (RIANZ) for shipments of 45,000 units. On the Australian Albums Chart, Country Grammar debuted at number 45. It re-entered the chart five times, and reached its peak at number 4 on the week of October 7, 2001. The album remained on the chart for thirty-three weeks, and was certified Triple platinum by the Australian Recording Industry Association (ARIA). Country Grammar reached at number 7 on the Canadian Albums Chart, and stayed on the chart for twenty-five weeks before dropping out. It was certified Triple Platinum by Music Canada (MC), denoting shipments of 300,000 copies. On the Dutch Albums Chart, the album peaked at number 8.

On the UK Albums Chart, Country Grammar reached at number 14, and stayed on it for 31 weeks. It was certified Gold by the British Phonographic Industry (BPI), for shipments of 100,000 units. The album peaked within the top thirty on the Belgian Albums Chart (Flanders), Finnish Albums Chart and Danish Albums Chart. It reached number 45 on the German Albums Chart, remaining on it for 43 weeks. It peaked on the Swiss Albums Chart and French Albums Chart at numbers 90 and 109 respectively. Country Grammar topped the US Top R&B/Hip-Hop Albums year-end chart in 2000.

== Legacy ==
According to Billboard, as of 2022, Country Grammar is one of the 15 best-performing 21st-century albums without any of its singles being number-one hits on the Billboard Hot 100. Country Grammar's success cemented Nelly's position as one of the most successful hip hop acts of the emerging decade. Vibe emphasized Nelly's expeditious fame, writing that the rapper debuted without the benefit of "guest spots or Pen and Pixel produced teasers on his CD cover". The magazine continued to note the rapper's absence of being associated with a notable group, "he just came out and sold two million records in less than a month". Nelly's success helped in making St. Louis more notable for emerging hip hop acts, increasing the city's general reputation. Country Grammar experienced commercial success, topping the US Billboard 200 chart for five weeks in 2000, eventually going on to sell over 9 million copies in the US, making it the ninth best-selling rap album of all time in the country. It is one of the highest certified albums in the US history, being certified ten times platinum by the Recording Industry Association of America (RIAA). Nelly ranked third on the Billboard 2000–2009 decade-end chart, due to the success of Country Grammar as well as his follow-up album Nellyville (2002). The latter album went on to sell 6,488,000 copies in the US.

Country Grammar was ranked as the 85th best album of all time on the Billboard Top 200 Albums of All Time.

== Track listing ==
All tracks are written by Nelly (Cornell Haynes, Jr.), additional writers listed below.

Country Grammar track listing
No.	Title	Writer(s)	Producer(s)	Length
1.	"Intro" (featuring Cedric the Entertainer)			1:21
2.	"St. Louie"	Jason Epperson	Jason "Jay E" Epperson	4:27
3.	"Greed, Hate, Envy"	Lavell Webb	City Spud	4:15
4.	"Country Grammar (Hot Shit)" (also known as "Country Grammar (Hot)")	Epperson	Epperson	4:47
5.	"Steal the Show" (featuring St. Lunatics)	Webb; Ali Jones; Tohri Harper; Robert Cleveland; Epperson	Epperson	5:27
6.	"Interlude" (featuring Cedric the Entertainer)			0:33
7.	"Ride wit Me" (featuring City Spud)	Webb; Epperson	Epperson	4:51
8.	"E.I."	Epperson	Epperson	4:45
9.	"Thicky Thick Girl" (featuring Murphy Lee and Ali)	Harper; Jones; Webb	City Spud	4:34
10.	"For My" (featuring Lil' Wayne)	Dwayne Carter, Jr.; Epperson	Epperson	4:08
11.	"Utha Side"	Epperson	Epperson	4:33
12.	"Tho Dem Wrappas"	Epperson	Epperson	4:09
13.	"Wrap Sumden" (featuring St. Lunatics)	Webb; Jones; Harper; Cleveland; Epperson	Epperson	4:16
14.	"Batter Up" (featuring Murphy Lee and Ali)	Epperson; Harper; Jones; Steve Wills	Steve "Blast" Wills	5:27
15.	"Never Let 'Em C U Sweat" (featuring The Teamsters)	Webb; Donell Simmons; Jamal Aziz; Jesse "Corparal" Wilson	City Spud	4:14
16.	"Luven Me"	Webb	City Spud	4:07
17.	"Outro" (featuring Cedric the Entertainer)			0:44
Total length:				66:35

Notes

- "Ride wit Me" contains a portion of composition from DeBarge's 1982's "I Like It".
- "Batter Up" contains a portion of composition from Primal Scream's "Movin' on Up".
- "Luven Me" samples elements from One Way's 1984 "Don't Stop (Ever Loving Me)". It also samples elements from Tony! Toni! Toné!'s 1990's "Whatever You Want".

== Personnel ==
Credits adapted from liner notes.

- Steve Eigner – recording
- Kenny Dykstra – recording, assistant
- Rich Travali – mixing
- Jason Standard – mixing, assistant
- Herb Powers – mastering
- Sandra Brummel – creative directing
- BENTO Design – design
- Jonathen Mannion – photography

== 20th anniversary live album ==
For the 20th anniversary of the album, Nelly performed the entire album live at MelodyVR. On February 19, 2021, the rapper released the album Country Grammar Live alongside a documentary film, Country Grammar – A St. Lunatics Story.

== Charts ==
=== Weekly charts ===
Weekly chart performance for Country Grammar
Chart (2000–2001)	Peak position
Australian Albums (ARIA)	4
Australian Dance Albums (ARIA)	25
Australian Urban Albums (ARIA)	1
Belgian Albums (Ultratop Flanders)	24
Canadian Albums (Billboard)	7
Canadian R&B Albums (Nielsen SoundScan)	2
Danish Albums (Hitlisten)	29
Dutch Albums (Album Top 100)	8
European Top 100 Albums (Music & Media)	36
Finnish Albums (Suomen virallinen lista)	26
French Albums (SNEP)	109
German Albums (Offizielle Top 100)	45
Irish Albums (IRMA)	15
New Zealand Albums (RMNZ)	3
Norwegian Albums (VG-lista)	35
Scottish Albums (Official Charts)	24
Swiss Albums (Schweizer Hitparade)	90
UK Albums (Official Charts)	14
UK R&B Albums (Official Charts)	3
US Billboard 200	1
US Top R&B/Hip-Hop Albums (Billboard)	1

=== Year-end charts ===
2000 year-end chart performance for Country Grammar
Chart (2000)	Position
Canadian Albums (Nielsen SoundScan)	51
US Billboard 200	14
US Top R&B/Hip-Hop Albums (Billboard)	6

2001 year-end chart performance for Country Grammar
Chart (2001)	Position
Australian Albums (ARIA)	27
Belgian Albums (Ultratop Flanders)	91
Canadian Albums (Nielsen SoundScan)	23
Canadian R&B Albums (Nielsen SoundScan)	7
Canadian Rap Albums (Nielsen SoundScan)	3
Dutch Albums (Album Top 100)	56
German Albums (Offizielle Top 100)	83
UK Albums (OCC)	83
US Billboard 200	10
US Top R&B/Hip-Hop Albums (Billboard)	13

2002 year-end chart performance for Country Grammar
Chart (2002)	Position
Canadian R&B Albums (Nielsen SoundScan)	41
Canadian Rap Albums (Nielsen SoundScan)	21
US Billboard 200	191

== Certifications ==
Certifications for Country Grammar
Region	Certification	Certified units/sales
Australia (ARIA)	Platinum	70,000^{^}
Canada (Music Canada)	3× Platinum	300,000^{^}
Germany (BVMI)	Gold	150,000^{‡}
New Zealand (RMNZ)	3× Platinum	45,000^{^}
United Kingdom (BPI)	Platinum	300,000^{^}
United States (RIAA)	Diamond	10,000,000^{‡}
^{^} Shipments figures based on certification alone.^{‡} Sales+streaming figures based on certification alone.

== Release history ==
Release history and formats for Country Grammar
Country	Date	Format(s)	Label	Ref.
Canada	June 27, 2000	CD	Universal	
United States	June 27, 2000	CD	Universal	
United Kingdom	June 29, 2000	CD	Universal	
Germany	September 25, 2000	CD	Universal	

== See also ==
- List of number-one albums of 2000 (U.S.)
- List of number-one R&B albums of 2000 (U.S.)
