= Black Air Force Activity 1 =

2019 mixtape by Teejayx6

- Standard cover art for the album, The Reload features a red tint as opposed to blue.

Mixtape by Teejayx6
- Released: December 13, 2019
- Genre: Scam rap
- Length: 21:45; 53:57 (The Reload)
- Labels: TF; Disruptive
- Producers: Damn Jon Boi; FreshDuzIt; Jose; JustCallMeChris; Kden Ju; SBG Manny

Teejayx6 chronology
The Swipe Lessons (2019)	Black Air Force Activity 1 (2019)	2020 (2020)

Singles from Black Air Force Activity 1
- 1. "Dark Web" Released: November 8, 2019; 2. "Gadgets" Released: December 2, 2019; 3. "On Tour" Released: February 22, 2020; 4. "Dynamic Duo 2" Released: February 28, 2020; 5. "Mosh Pit" Released: March 27, 2020; 6. "Punchin'" Released: June 26, 2020

Black Air Force Activity 1 is a mixtape by American rapper Teejayx6. Released on December 13, 2019 through The Family Entertainment and Disruptive, the mixtape is notable for its scam-centric lyrics. Black Air Force Activity 1 contains a sole guest appearance from fellow Detroit rapper Kasher Quon. Production was handled by multiple producers, including Kdun Ju, JustCallMeChris, Damn Jon Boi, Jose, SBG Manny and FreshDuzIt.

Black Air Force Activity 1 was supported by three singles, "Dark Web", "Gadgets", and "Dynamic Duo 2" (feat. Kasher Quon). It is a hip hop mixtape, incorporating elements of scam rap and Detroit trap, and featuring lyrics about scamming, identity theft, and credit card fraud.

On August 28, 2020, Teejayx6 released a deluxe edition of the mixtape titled Black Air Force Activity: The Reload.

== Background and composition ==
Teejayx6 first started gaining recognition because of his breakout single "Dark Web". On the song, he describes the process of using the TOR browser to access the dark web, and he details wild things he has witnessed there. On December 2, 2019, the second single, "Gadgets" was released. The song is about different equipment used to commit fraud, such as burner phones and MacBooks.

Black Air Force Activity 1 is a hip hop mixtape, specifically scam rap, a subgenre Teejay has been labeled a pioneer and even the "de facto leader" of. The lyrics on the mixtape include references to scamming, "trash-talking" and dark humor.

The title of the mixtape is derived from the black-on-black styling of the sneaker model of the same name manufactured by Nike, and the slang term "black air force energy", describing someone or something wild, aggressive, and with a flagrant disregard and contempt for others and established rules.

== Black Air Force Activity: The Reload ==
On August 28, 2020, Teejayx6 released a deluxe edition of the mixtape titled Black Air Force Activity: The Reload. It features an additional 12 songs, with guest vocals from NLE Choppa, Bang Gang Lonnie Gang, Sada Baby, Kasher Quon, 10kkev, and Drego & Beno, production by TrapBoy 3K, JTK, Lee Choppin, Helluva, K Swisha, Da Honorable C.N.O.T.E., Antt Beatz, Haze, and UNDEFINED. The Reload was supported by three singles, "On Tour", "Mosh Pit" and "Punchin'".

== Track listing ==
Credits adapted from Tidal.

Black Air Force Activity 1 track listing
No.	Title	Writer(s)	Producer(s)	Length
1.	"Gadgets"	Dallas Antonio Asberry; Davaughn Clark	Jose	2:46
2.	"Spotlights"	Asberry; Justin Wilson	Kden Ju	2:05
3.	"Reader & Writer"	Asberry; Darzell Triplett	FreshDuzIt	2:39
4.	"Dark Web"	Asberry; Jonathan Burt	Damn Jon Boi	2:43
5.	"Work Out"	Asberry; Manuel Arana	SBG Manny	2:12
6.	"Swipe Lesson 3"	Asberry; Wilson	Kden Ju	2:13
7.	"Computer Junkie"	Asberry; Wilson	Kden Ju	1:50
8.	"Dynamic Duo 2" (featuring Kasher Quon)	Asberry; Marquon Fulton; Christopher Nichols	JustCallMeChris	5:13
Total length:				21:45

Black Air Force Activity: The Reload track listing
No.	Title	Writer(s)	Producer(s)	Length
9.	"Reload"	Asberry; Jalyn Crawford	TrapBoy3K; Rocket LaFlare	3:01
10.	"Black Air Force Activity"	Asberry; Jordan T. Knight	JTK	2:36
11.	"Allah"	Asberry; Lee Choppin	Lee Choppin	2:44
12.	"Daily Reminder"	Asberry; Martin McCurtis	Helluva	2:29
13.	"Punchin'" (featuring NLE Choppa)	Asberry; Bryson Lushon Potts; Karl Hamnqvist	K Swisha	3:17
14.	"Business Owner" (featuring Band Gang Lonnie Bands and Sada Baby)	Asberry; Delante Landrum; Casada Aaron Sorrell; McCurtis	Helluva	2:36
15.	"Mosh Pit"	Asberry; Carlton Mays; Marquis Davis	Da Honorable C.N.O.T.E.; M-80	2:09
16.	"Techno"	Asberry; Arana	SBG Manny	2:29
17.	"Handful"	Asberry; McCurtis	Helluva	2:21
18.	"Withdraw" (featuring Kasher Quon and 10kkev)	Asberry; Fulton; McCurtis	Helluva	2:45
19.	"In A Min" (featuring Drego & Beno)	Asberry; Anthony Mathis; Deandre Pearson; Brian Valdere Rivers	Antt Beatz	3:09
20.	"On Tour"	Asberry; Rashad Muhammed	Haze; UNDEFINED	2:31
Total length:				53:57
