= Bfb Da Packman =

American rapper (born 1995)

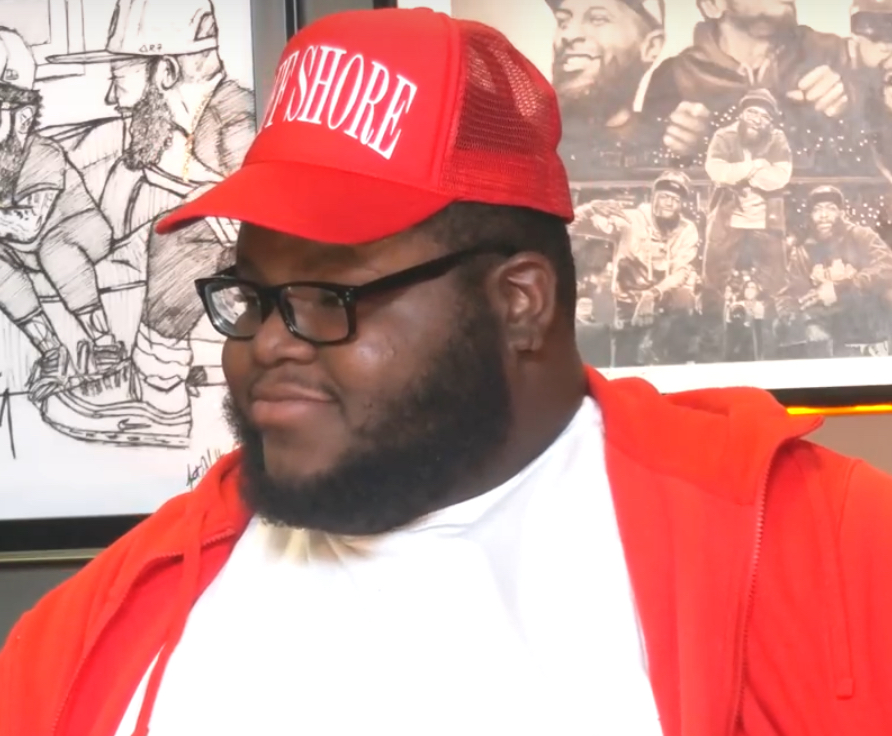
- Bfb Da Packman in 2021

Background information
- Born: Tyree Jawan Thomas; June 2, 1995 (age 31); Flint, Michigan, U.S.
- Genre: Hip hop
- Occupation: Rapper
- Labels: The Lunch Crew Company; Tunecore

Tyree Jawan Thomas (born June 2, 1995), known professionally as Bfb Da Packman, is an American rapper. He became known with his 2020 single "Free Joe Exotic" (with Sada Baby), which gained 10 million views on YouTube in six weeks.

== Early life ==
Thomas was born on June 2, 1995, in Flint, Michigan. He lived with his mother, stepfather, and brother in the Selby Hood area. He first started rapping when in the sixth grade. Not long after, he started selling marijuana to earn extra money. Thomas sold Illegal drugs throughout his teens, eventually catching a case involving both guns and drugs. After this incident he made the choice to trade-in living a life of crime, and not waste his talent. In 2015, Thomas moved from Flint to Houston, Texas after being released from probation for the weapons and drug charges. In Houston, he found a job at the United States Postal Service while continuing to rap in his free time.

== Career ==
In 2019, he released the projects God Blessing All the Fat Niggas and STD.

On June 14, 2020, Thomas released the single "Free Joe Exotic" alongside fellow Michigan rapper Sada Baby, which became his breakout hit. The song was inspired and named after Joe Exotic, the subject of Tiger King released from March 20 to April 12, 2020. According to Thomas, he had to get a "guest-feature discount" to include Sada Baby in the song. In September 2020, he said on Twitter that making music helped pay off his grandmother's debt. On September 26, 2020, he released the single "Fun Time" with Wiz Khalifa. On December 11, 2020, he was featured on a remix of "Alpha" by Guapdad 4000. The music video was supported by skits posted onto Twitter, with Guapdad in whiteface as "Permit Patrick."

On March 19, 2021, he released the single "Federal" alongside a music video. On June 22, 2021, Thomas announced his debut album, Fat Niggas Need Love Too, would be released on June 25. The album includes artists such as Benny the Butcher, Coi Leray, Sada Baby, Wiz Khalifa, Lil Yachty, Zack Fox, and DDG. As well as the album, he released the single "Weekend at Solomon's" along with a music video. In an interview with Vice about the album, Thomas hoped that the album could bring him closer to leaving the USPS.

== Discography ==
=== Studio albums ===
Title	Album details
Fat Niggas Need Love Too	Released: June 25, 2021; Label: The Lunch Crew Company; Format: Digital download, streaming
Forget Me Not	Released: March 29, 2024; Label: The Lunch Crew Company; Format: Digital download, streaming

=== Projects ===
Title	Album details
God Blessing All the Fat Niggas	Released: June 2, 2019; Label: The Lunch Crew Company; Format: Digital download, streaming
STD	Released: November 17, 2019; Label: The Lunch Crew Company; Format: Digital download, streaming

=== Singles ===
List of singles as lead artist/feature
Title	Year	Album(s)
"Fleek"	2015	—N/a
"Red Cups"	2015	—N/a
"Brilliant Pieces"	2016	—N/a
"Connors Revenge"	2018	—N/a
"Issa Scam"	2018	God Bless All the Fat Niggas
"Snack Time (On Some Shit Patch)"	2018	God Bless All the Fat Niggas
"Aubrey I Need You on This Song"	2019	God Bless All the Fat Niggas
"To-Go Plate"	2019	—N/a
"ScamYouLous" (feat. Teejayx6 and FMB Longmoney)	2020	—N/a
"Uhhhh"	2020	—N/a
"NorthSide Ghetto Soulja"	2020	Fat Niggas Need Love Too
"Free Joe Exotic"	2020	Fat Niggas Need Love Too
"Made Me Mad"	2020	
"Fun Time" (feat. Wiz Khalifa)	2020	Fat Niggas Need Love Too
"Honey Pack"	2020	Fat Niggas Need Love Too
"Honey Pack" (feat. Lil Yachty and DDG)	2021	Fat Niggas Need Love Too
"Coke in the Sprinter"	2021	—N/a
"Federal"	2021	Fat Niggas Need Love Too
"Weekend at Solomon's"	2021	Fat Niggas Need Love Too
