= Joe Exotic =

American media personality (born 1963)

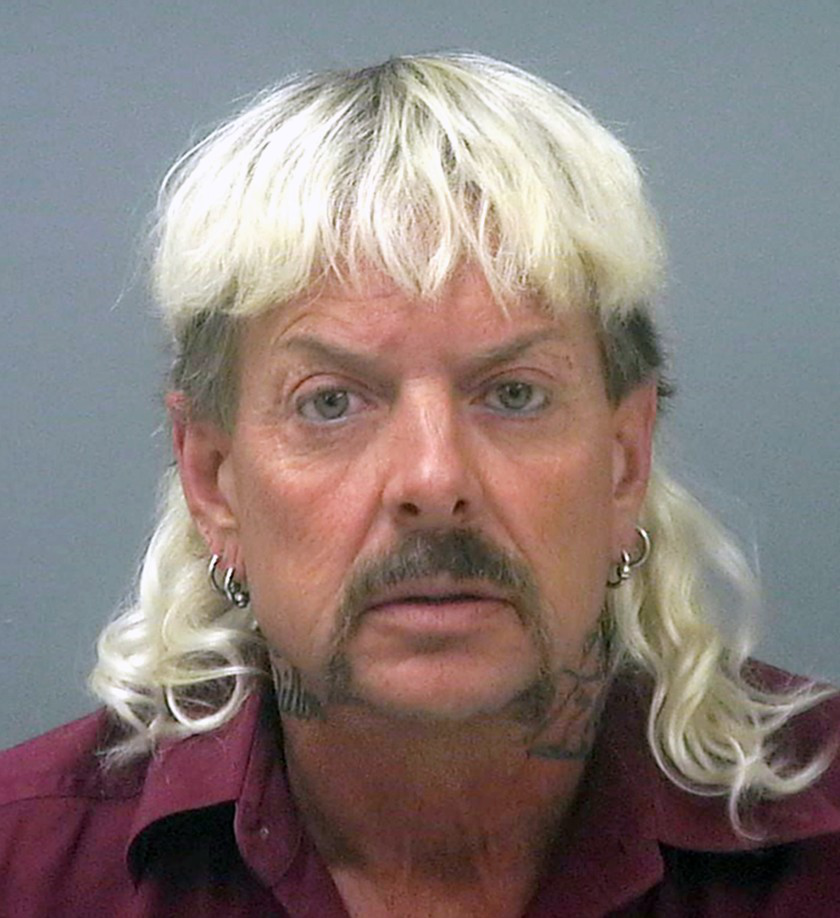
- Mugshot, 2018
- Born: Joseph Allen Schreibvogel; March 5, 1963 (age 63); Garden City, Kansas, U.S.
- Other name: The Tiger King
- Television: America's Most Dangerous Pets (2011); Predator Pets (2018); Tiger King (2020); Louis Theroux: Shooting Joe Exotic (2021)
- Political party: Libertarian (2018–2019); Democratic (2023–2024); Independent (2016, 2024–present)
- Spouses: Travis Maldonado (m. 2015; died 2017) Dillon Passage (m. 2017; div. 2023) Jorge Flores (m. 2025)
- Partner: Brian Rhyne (1986–2001; his death)
- Status: Incarcerated at Federal Medical Center, Lexington
- Convictions: Conspiracy to commit murder-for-hire; Violation of the Lacey Act (8 counts); Violation of the Endangered Species Act (9 counts)
- Penalty: 21 years in prison

Details
- Date apprehended: September 7, 2018
- Website: Official website Campaign website

Joseph Allen Maldonado-Passage (né Schreibvogel; born March 5, 1963), known professionally as Joe Exotic, is an American media personality and businessman who operated the Greater Wynnewood Exotic Animal Park in Wynnewood, Oklahoma, from 1999 to 2018.

Born in Kansas, Maldonado and his family moved to Texas, where he dropped out of Pilot Point High School. After graduation, he briefly served as the chief of police in Eastvale. He then opened a pet store with his brother, but after his brother's death in 1997, he sold the store and founded the G. W. Zoo. During his tenure as director there, he also held magic shows and cub-petting events at venues across the U.S., hosted an online talk show, and worked with producer Rick Kirkham to create a reality television series about himself, but this latter effort ended when most footage was destroyed in a fire in 2015. In 2016, Maldonado ran as an independent in the 2016 presidential election, earning attention as a novelty candidate due to his eccentric persona and unconventional campaign style.

Maldonado left the G. W. Zoo in June 2018 and was arrested three months later on suspicion of hiring two men to murder Big Cat Rescue founder Carole Baskin, with whom he had a complicated rivalry. In 2019, Maldonado was convicted and sentenced to 22 years in prison on 17 federal charges of animal abuse and two counts of attempted murder for hire for the plot to kill Baskin. In 2021, he worked with attorney John Michael Phillips to file a motion for a new trial, and on July 15, 2021, a U.S. appeals court ruled that the convictions for the two murder attempts were wrongly treated as separate. The trial court reduced his sentence by 1 year, resentencing him to 21 years in late January 2022. In 2023, Maldonado announced his candidacy in the 2024 presidential election, first as a Libertarian before officially running as a Democrat.

Maldonado has been subject to substantial criticism, especially for the controversies surrounding his feud with Baskin and the treatment of animals at the G. W. Zoo. He has been featured in several documentaries, including the Netflix series Tiger King (2020–2021), a documentary about Exotic's career as a zookeeper and his feud with Baskin. The success of the first season of Tiger King amid the worldwide COVID-19 lockdowns led to Maldonado receiving attention on social media and inspiring several internet memes. Maldonado also appeared in two Louis Theroux documentaries, America's Most Dangerous Pets (2011) and Louis Theroux: Shooting Joe Exotic (2021). A drama TV show based mainly on the relationship between Carole Baskin and Joe Exotic called Joe vs. Carole aired on Peacock on March 3, 2022.

== Early life ==
Joe Exotic was born Joseph Allen Schreibvogel in Garden City, Kansas, on March 5, 1963, to parents Francis (1932–2021) and Shirley Schreibvogel (1934–2019). The Schreibvogels had four other children: Tamara, Pamela, Yarri, and Garold Wayne (known as "G. W.").

The Schreibvogel family moved to Texas, where Joe was enrolled at Pilot Point High School. After graduating from high school, he joined the Eastvale police department and was promoted to chief of the small department in 1982. He was outed to his parents as being homosexual by his estranged older brother Yarri, and in response their father made Exotic shake his hand and promise not to come to his funeral. Exotic has said that he was badly injured in 1985 when he crashed his police cruiser into a bridge, although his claims about the wreck have changed over time: In 2019, he told Texas Monthly that the incident was a spontaneous suicide attempt, but he told The Dallas Morning News in 1997 that he was forced off the road by an unidentified vehicle during a drug investigation. A 2019 investigation by New York magazine, which included interviews of family members and local residents who knew him at the time, failed to find anyone who could recall such an event taking place, although he presented a photograph showing a wrecked car as evidence.

== Career ==
=== Animals ===
After leaving his police position, Maldonado (then named Schreibvogel) moved to West Palm Beach, Florida, and managed a pet store. A friend who worked at a drive-through safari park brought baby lions to his neighbor's home and let Schreibvogel handle them. Maldonado credits these experiences with inspiring him to work with animals.

Schreibvogel returned to Texas and worked at various jobs before opening a pet shop with his brother "G. W.", who shared his love of animals, in Arlington, Texas, in 1986. In 1997, after closing the first pet shop and opening a new one nearby, Schreibvogel came into conflict with Arlington officials over repeated code violations for decorations and signs: He had been hanging gay pride symbols such as a United States flag with rainbow stripes in the shop windows, and he accused city inspectors of homophobia and of targeting the business because of his sexual orientation. In 1997, his brother was killed in an auto accident, and Schreibvogel sold the pet shop and purchased a 16-acre (6.5 ha) Oklahoma farm with his parents. Two years after his brother's death, the farm opened as Garold Wayne Exotic Animal Memorial Park in dedication to his brother. Two of Wayne's pets were the zoo's first inhabitants.

In 2000, Schreibvogel acquired his first two tigers, which had been abandoned. He said that the first animal rescue in his career as a zookeeper was an eleven-foot alligator with a severe eye infection. According to Exotic, he spoke by phone to Steve Irwin of Australia Zoo, whose vets provided advice on appropriate antibiotics for alligators and on treating an injured kangaroo. In 2006, after Irwin was killed by a stingray, Exotic dedicated a large indoor alligator complex inside the G. W. Zoo in his memory, naming it the Steve Irwin Memorial. Some of the alligators in the complex came from Michael Jackson's Neverland Ranch.

In 2002, seeking to earn money to feed his growing menagerie, Exotic partnered with a traveling magician to provide and handle tigers during stage illusions. The experience taught Exotic that traveling magic shows could be lucrative, and after parting with the magician, he began staging shows himself and adopted "Joe Exotic" as his stage name. He soon found that attendees would pay to pet and have their picture taken with tiger cubs, and these activities were often more profitable than the magic show itself. His magic shows evolved into dedicated cub-petting events and he began breeding his cats to ensure that cubs were consistently available. The money he earned allowed him to increase the number of adult cats at his park and feed them. To benefit his stage persona, Exotic began behaving more flamboyantly, wearing flashy clothing and jewelry and adopting his trademark bleached mullet hairstyle.

Exotic worked as the owner and operator of the G. W. Zoo for over 20 years. He left the zoo on June 18, 2018, three months before his arrest. In 2021, Exotic stated that his whole outlook on animals in captivity had changed while he was in jail, and he now believes that "no animal belongs in a cage". He also said that he never would have had a zoo if he had known what life inside a cage was like 20 years ago.

=== Music ===
During his career as a zoo owner, Exotic was also an aspiring country music singer, although music credited to him was recorded by others. Under the pretense of obtaining music for a planned reality television series, Exotic commissioned country songs from other artists, with his creative contributions reportedly being limited to suggesting song topics and singing some backing vocals. He produced music videos for the songs and posted them on his YouTube channel, depicting himself as the main performer and taking full credit for the music, allegedly without having notified the actual artists. One of Exotic's best-known songs is "I Saw a Tiger", which was featured in Tiger King and has been covered by numerous bands and artists.

Exotic's two studio albums, I Saw a Tiger (2014) and Star Struck (2015), are featured in the Tiger King episode "Not Your Average Joe". In April 2023 "My Best Friends" was released, the first single from Jungle Rhapsody: A Tiger King Experience - Exotic's third studio album that was partially recorded in federal prison and produced by JT Barnett, Jonathan Hay and William Moseley.

=== Appearance in documentaries ===
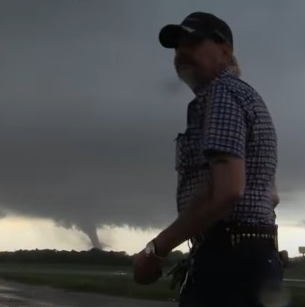
Exotic in 2016, in front of the Katie-Wynnewood EF4 tornado

Exotic first appeared in Louis Theroux's 2011 documentary America's Most Dangerous Pets. Five years later, he appeared in J.D. Thompson's documentary The Life Exotic: Or the Incredible True Story of Joe Schreibvogel. Theroux stated that Exotic initially struck him as likeable and friendly, and that, owing to Exotic's emotional volatility, Theroux was inclined to be protective of him.

The Netflix documentary series Tiger King: Murder, Mayhem and Madness is centered on Exotic and his rivalry with Carole Baskin. The first season of the series was released in March 2020, coinciding with the worldwide COVID-19 lockdown following the COVID-19 outbreak being classified as a pandemic by the World Health Organization. A week after the release of Tiger King, both the series and Exotic himself went viral, with numerous internet memes about both Exotic and Baskin being made. In a Netflix interview in prison, Exotic stated that he was thankful for the fame and that he was "done with the Baskin saga".

In July 2020, Discovery released the documentary Surviving Joe Exotic, which is focused on the animals at the G. W. Zoo. The documentary features interviews with Exotic and former G. W. Zoo employees, with the Exotic interview scenes having been filmed four months before his arrest.

In April 2021, Louis Theroux released a new documentary on Exotic, titled Shooting Joe Exotic, on BBC Two in the United Kingdom. The documentary contained unseen footage of Exotic from a previous documentary by Theroux as well as new interviews of other people associated with Exotic, including Exotic's legal team and Howard and Carole Baskin, his estranged niece and brother, as well as a tour around the abandoned and extensively vandalized former G. W. Zoo property.

=== Other ventures ===
From 2014 to 2018, Exotic occasionally worked as a professional wrestling commentator and hosted two wrestling programs at the G. W. Zoo. Exotic's involvement with wrestling began when he met Texas businessman and pro wrestling promoter Robert Langdon at the G. W. Zoo's "Monkey Ball" charity event in 2010. They bonded over their ownership of exotic animals, and Exotic began to provide color commentary at NWA Texoma events, which would be streamed on the JoeExoticTV YouTube channel. Langdon walked Exotic down the aisle for his marriage to former husband Dillon Passage.

In May 2021, Exotic launched a cryptocurrency to raise revenue for his defense fund as well as charity incentives personal to him. In June 2021, Exotic launched an NFT auction as part of a collaboration with a cryptocurrency organization. Exotic also intended to send real-life collectibles, including one of his revolvers.

== Politics ==
=== 2016 presidential campaign ===
Exotic ran as an independent candidate in the 2016 United States presidential election, attaining ballot access in Colorado and receiving 962 votes (including recorded write-ins) nationwide. During his campaign, Exotic uploaded several video messages to then-Republican nominee Donald Trump, in which he called out several politicians he said were crooked, Baskin and other animal rights people who he alleged were scamming the public, and various laws he disagreed with.

While running for president, Exotic was featured in an episode of Last Week Tonight with John Oliver, which covered Exotic's write-in campaign as part of the show's coverage of the 2016 U.S. presidential election. John Oliver complimented the production quality of Exotic's music videos, and came up with a campaign slogan for Exotic: Make America Exotic Again, which later inspired the title of the Tiger King episode covering Exotic's political runs. Before the episode aired, Oliver was warned about the controversies at Exotic's zoo and his rants toward Baskin.

During the 2016 United States presidential election, Exotic supported Trump over Hillary Clinton.

=== 2018 Oklahoma gubernatorial campaign ===
After losing in the 2016 election, Joe Exotic ran in the 2018 Libertarian Party primary election for governor of Oklahoma. He received 664 votes in the primary, finishing last among the three Libertarian candidates. During his primary campaign, he was officially censured by the Oklahoma Libertarian Party. In 2019, following his arrest, the state convention voted unanimously to revoke his party membership.

Initial primary results by county: Chris Powell: 100%; 80–90%; 70–80%; 60–70%; 50–60%; 40–50%; Powell/Lawhorn tie: <40%; 40–50%; 50%; Rex L. Lawhorn: 40–50%; 50–60%; 60–70%; 70–80%; 100%; Joe Exotic: 40–50%; 70–80%; 100%; No votes: No Votes

2018 Libertarian gubernatorial primary
Party	Candidate	Votes	%
	Chris Powell	1,740	48.9
	Rex L. Lawhorn	1,154	32.4
	Joe Exotic	664	18.7
Total votes		3,558	100%

=== 2020 presidential campaign ===
On January 13, 2017, Exotic filed with the Federal Election Commission to run for president as a Libertarian in the 2020 Libertarian Party presidential primaries. On June 1, 2017, he filed paperwork to run in the 2018 Oklahoma gubernatorial election and ended his presidential campaign to shift his focus to the Oklahoma gubernatorial race.

=== 2024 presidential campaign ===
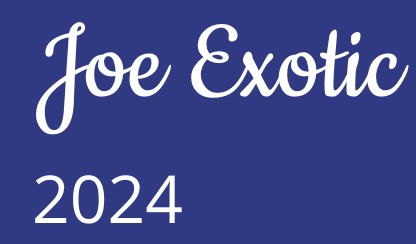
Exotic's 2024 presidential campaign logo

In 2022, Exotic expressed interest in running for president with Andrew Tate as his running mate.

On March 13, 2023, Exotic announced a bid for the Libertarian Party presidential nomination in the 2024 election, which he ran from prison. His candidacy was criticized by party chair Angela McArdle shortly after he announced it. On April 11, 2023, Exotic announced he would run as a Democrat instead.

In August 2024, Exotic suspended his presidential campaign and endorsed Donald Trump.

On November 12, 2024, Exotic replied to a fan on his verified Instagram account that he is an independent voter. This comment was made on his post asking for his fans to fill out a form online so he would have a chance at being pardoned by the new president elect, Donald Trump.

=== Outside of the United States ===
In April 2025, Exotic endorsed Australian Labor Party leader and incumbent Prime Minister Anthony Albanese in the 2025 Australian federal election.

== Legal violations, controversies and criminal convictions ==
=== Animal abuse claims and USDA violations ===
Exotic has been strongly criticized for his treatment of animals that he owns, including by Carole Baskin, which eventually led to an investigation by the USDA and convictions for animal abuse.

In February 1999, animal welfare investigators discovered a large number of neglected emus in Red Oak, Texas, and Exotic volunteered to capture the animals and take them to his animal park. However, Exotic, local volunteers, and Red Oak police were quickly overwhelmed by the task of corralling the large and fast-running birds, several of which died. Exotic and another man resorted to killing emus with shotguns and were accused of animal cruelty by police. However, since the emus were considered livestock, they could lawfully be killed humanely in Texas, and a grand jury declined to indict Exotic. Most of the surviving birds ultimately wound up at Texas ranches.

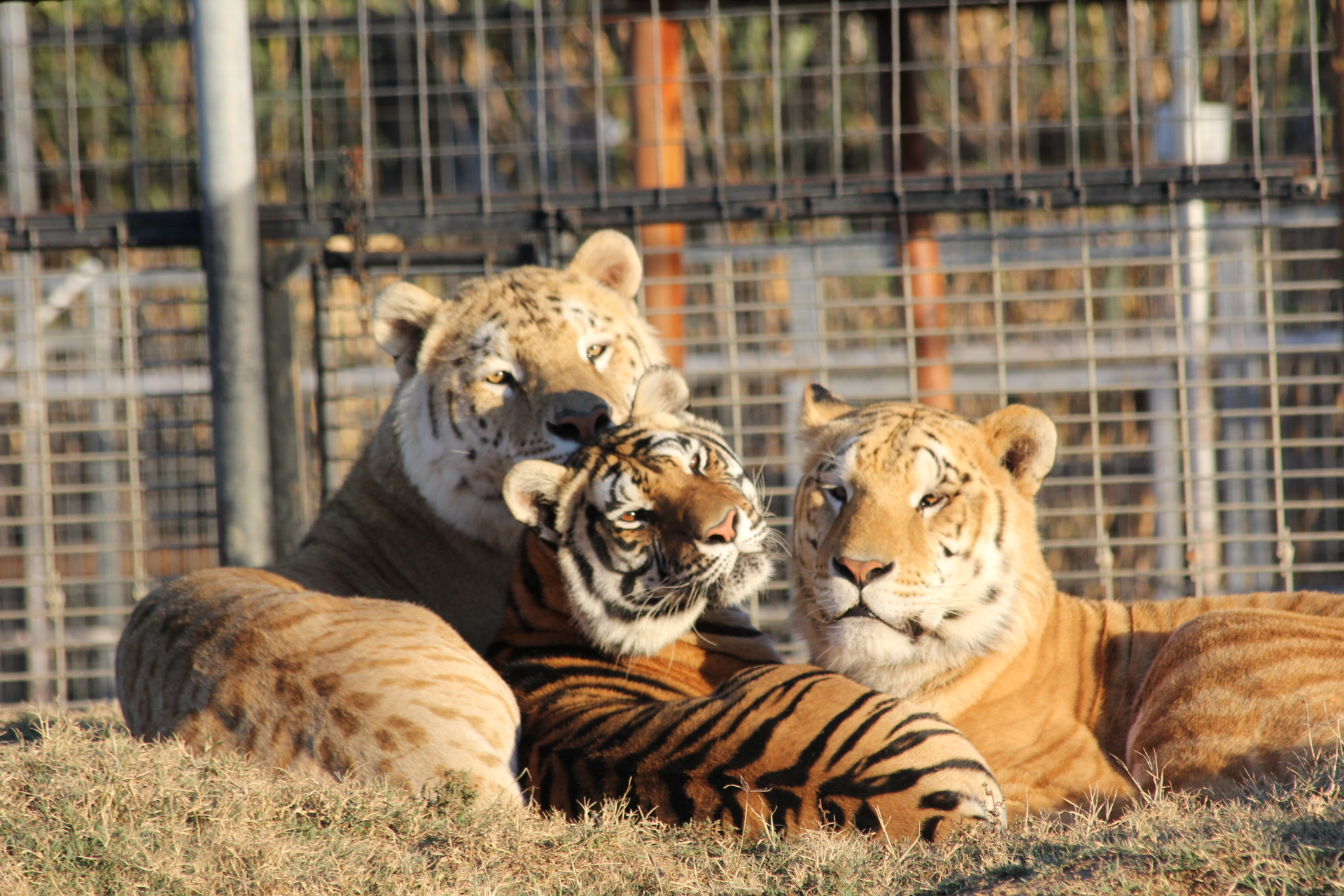
A group of big cats at Exotic's zoo, including a Taliger. To feed his large number of big cats, Exotic shot horses and fed their remains to the tigers. He also fed them expired Walmart meat.

In 2000, to feed his growing zoo of big cats, he took in horses that were donated to him. He would shoot the horses and feed them whole to the tigers, lions, and other big cats. Due to the number of exotic animals at his zoo, Exotic found feeding them all to be expensive. To help offset the cost, Exotic fed them expired meat from Walmart. Employees at the zoo also ate this expired Walmart meat because they were only paid $150 a week, and they also used the expired meat to make pizzas that were sold to customers.

In 2006, the G. W. Zoo was cited multiple times by the United States Department of Agriculture (USDA) for violations of Animal Welfare Act standards. In 2020, Exotic was convicted of falsifying wildlife records in violation of the Endangered Species Act.

=== Feud with Carole Baskin ===
The feud between Exotic and Carole Baskin began in 2009 when Baskin, who sought to end commercial cub petting in the United States, targeted Exotic's lucrative traveling shows. While Exotic and the Wynnewood park had been subject to protests and investigations by animal rights organizations such as People for the Ethical Treatment of Animals, these efforts had been sporadic and poorly organized and did not seriously hamper his business. Baskin's Big Cat Rescue organization—which had a very popular Facebook page and many informal volunteers recruited on social media—proved more daunting. Big Cat Rescue volunteers began to track Exotic's movements and email bomb managers of shopping malls that hosted his shows, prompting many of them to cancel, which jeopardized his income.

Exotic saw Baskin's actions as hypocritical because she also operated an animal sanctuary that charged admission, albeit for nonprofit purposes. Exotic responded to Baskin's social media efforts by setting up his own TV studio and YouTube channel at the G. W. Zoo, hosting a nightly talk show that aired vitriolic attacks against Big Cat Rescue and Baskin personally. He covertly visited Big Cat Rescue in September 2010 and chartered a helicopter to survey the property. He obtained a copy of Baskin's diary stolen from her computer by a former employee and posted excerpts online.

Baskin's second husband, Don Lewis, disappeared in 1997 and was declared legally dead in 2002. Evidence of foul play is lacking and Baskin was never named as a suspect; however, Lewis's daughter says that Baskin killed Lewis and fed his body to her tigers, and Exotic used his YouTube show to promote this theory and others relating to Lewis's disappearance, offering a $10,000 reward for information leading to Baskin's arrest.

In 2011, Exotic copied the Big Cat Rescue name and various identifying aspects of the sanctuary's branding in his marketing, rebranding his traveling show as "Big Cat Rescue Entertainment" with a Florida phone number. Baskin said that she was quickly inundated with emails and phone calls from distraught supporters who assumed that she was operating the traveling show. Baskin sued Exotic for trademark infringement and was eventually awarded a $1 million settlement from him although she was unable to collect most of it. As a result of the order, Exotic filed for bankruptcy. In 2012, Exotic began making a series of threats against Baskin on social media platforms including Facebook and YouTube.

In 2015, Exotic's mother Shirley was sued by Big Cat Rescue over assets that belonged to Exotic or the G. W. Zoo being transferred into and out of her name. In May 2020, the United States District Court for the Western District of Oklahoma ruled that Exotic fraudulently transferred ownership of the park to his mother to avoid paying debts resulting from the earlier settlement, awarding ownership to Baskin and giving Exotic's former business partner Jeff Lowe until October 1 to vacate the premises. Baskin decided to sell the park with deed restrictions prohibiting the keeping of exotic animals. Lowe relocated the animals to Thackerville, Oklahoma, intending to open a new park there, but the U.S. Justice Department filed a lawsuit citing Lowe's history of poor animal care; the new park never opened and federal authorities seized all remaining cats in May 2021.

=== Steve Irwin Memorial and TV studio fire ===
On March 26, 2015, a fire broke out at the G. W. Zoo, destroying the Steve Irwin Memorial and Exotic's TV studio, where he shot his YouTube videos and stored footage for a planned reality series. All but one of the Neverland Ranch alligators were killed. The blaze was thought to have been started by an arsonist, possibly a vindictive employee, but no one was ever arrested. Exotic blamed animal rights activists for the incident, while Tiger King speculated that the perpetrator may have been Exotic himself or Rick Kirkham, the reality TV producer who worked with him.

Kirkham asserts that Exotic and zoo employees sought to destroy incriminating footage he had stored in the TV studio. Kirkham says that Exotic killed some of his own tigers, and that he had video of Exotic killing animals, but it was lost in the fire. During an interview, Kirkham remarked, "There was footage in there of Exotic actually killing animals for fun. In the course of my year, he walked up to a tiger he didn't like and just shot it in the head."

=== Feuds with his family and former employees ===
With the exception of his brother Garold, Exotic did not have a good relationship with his family; in particular, his estranged brother Yarri has been very critical of him, believing that he manipulated the Schreibvogel family to take the money from Garold's death for himself. Exotic's niece Chealsi Putman, who worked at the G. W. Zoo periodically from 1999 to 2017, also criticized him. In April 2021, Putman was interviewed by Louis Theroux for Shooting Joe Exotic and claimed that the tigers Exotic shot were not sick.

Several of Exotic's former employees at the G. W. Zoo have called out his actions in interviews after the release of Tiger King. He has most frequently been criticised by Rick Kirkham, who claimed that things were "a hell of a lot worse" than what's depicted in Tiger King; "[Watching Tiger King], you kinda had a little bit of a heart for the guy, but you really didn't realize or get to see how evil he really could be, not only to animals, but to people." In the Tiger King aftershow, Kirkham stated that Exotic was terrified of lions and tigers, and remarked, "It's idiotic to think how Exotic's become famous as the Tiger King when he's so terrified of big cats."

=== Feud with quarterback Jordan Travis ===
In September 2023, Joe Exotic threatened legal action against Florida State Seminoles quarterback Jordan Travis for allegedly infringing on Exotic's trademark of "Tiger King".

Exotic released the following statement on his social media:

"Jordan Travis was 6 years old when I became The Tiger King, it is my trademark, my intellectual property and I'm sick of others cashing in on my Trademark just because President Biden cares nothing about me being wrongfully in prison in America. I will give ANY ATTORNEY 80% of a settlement to sue Jordan Travis and ALL companies selling stuff using Tiger King. Time quarterbacks and anyone else in this country stops stealing from others, which attorney would like to take this multimillion dollar case? Until Jordan Travis walks in a cage with 20 full grown tigers and kisses them on the head, leave the Tiger King business to me."

=== Conviction and imprisonment ===
In November 2017, Exotic told two men he would pay them several thousand dollars to kill Baskin; one of them was an undercover informant for the Federal Bureau of Investigation (FBI). As a result of an investigation by the FBI, the U.S. Marshals Service, the United States Fish and Wildlife Service Office of Law Enforcement, and the Oklahoma Department of Wildlife Conservation, Exotic was arrested and arraigned on charges of murder for hire and of violating the Lacey Act and the Endangered Species Act. In April 2019, a federal jury found him guilty on two counts of hiring someone to murder Baskin in Florida, eight counts of violating the Lacey Act by falsifying wildlife records, and nine counts of violating the Endangered Species Act by killing five tigers and selling tigers across state lines. He was sentenced to 22 years in prison on January 22, 2020, and was incarcerated at Federal Medical Center, Fort Worth (FMC Fort Worth). In March 2020, Exotic filed a lawsuit against those he blamed for his arrest and conviction, including the U.S. Fish and Wildlife Service, the lead prosecutor, a federal agent, and former business partner Jeff Lowe; he sought $94 million, he dropped the lawsuit five months later.

In April 2020, Exotic was a topic of conversation during a White House COVID-19 press conference. A few days later, Donald Trump Jr. joked about the prospect of Exotic getting a pardon.

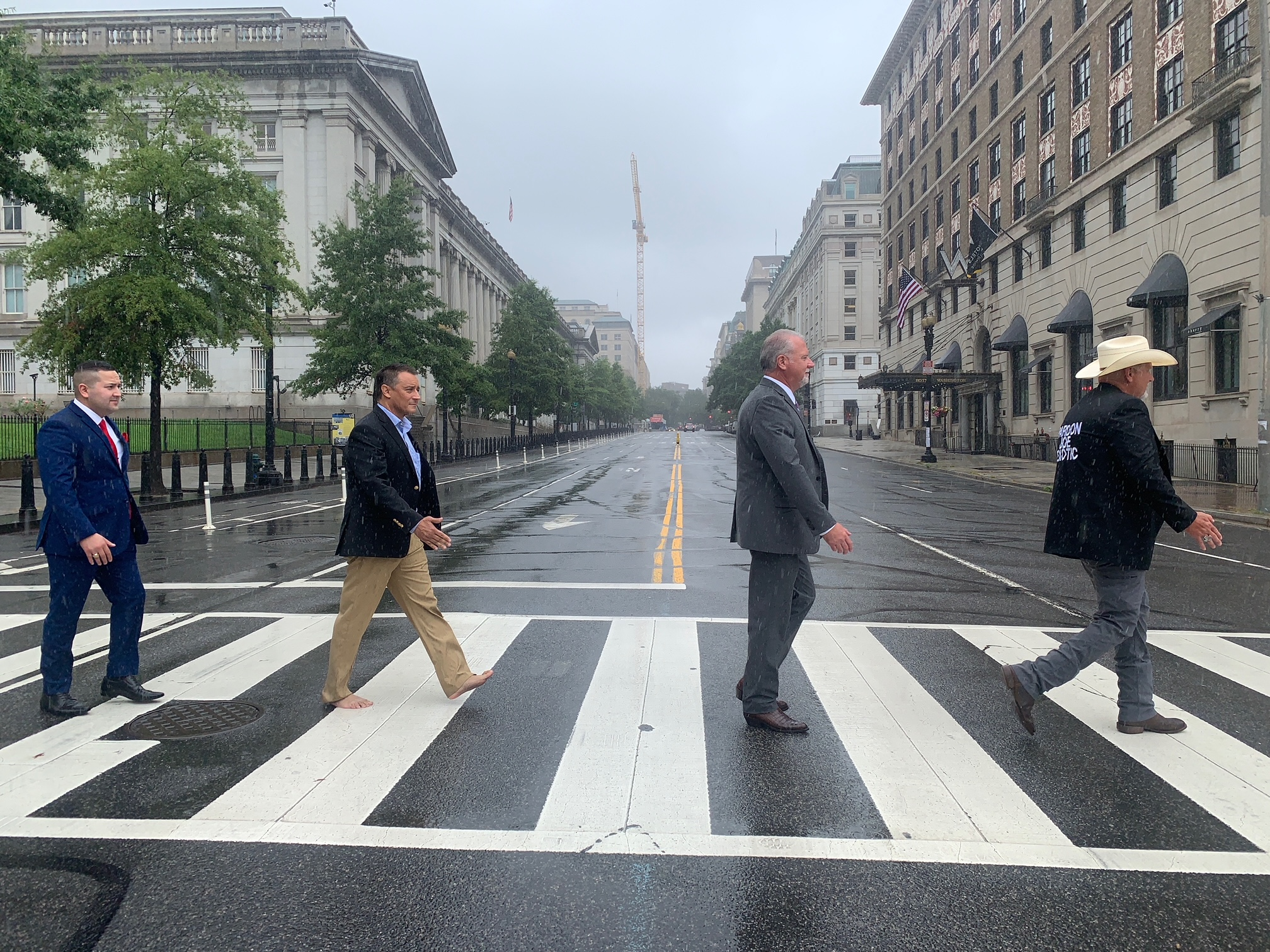
Exotic's "Team Tiger" heading to Washington, D.C., to present Exotic's pardon request to then-President Donald Trump, January 2021 (evoking the album cover of the Beatles' Abbey Road)

In May 2020, a private investigator, attorneys representing Exotic, and a group of volunteers calling themselves "Team Tiger" delivered a 257-page document to the U.S. Department of Justice disputing elements of his conviction and requesting a pardon from President Donald Trump. The following month, Trump described Exotic and his supporters as "strange" but did not say whether he would consider pardoning him. On January 19, 2021, the day before the inauguration of Joe Biden, Team Tiger chartered a limousine in Fort Worth to prepare for Exotic's anticipated last-minute pardon and release. However, he ultimately was not pardoned and remained incarcerated at FMC Fort Worth. It was reported in March 2021 that Exotic intended to seek a pardon from President Joe Biden. Later that month, Exotic hired John Michael Phillips and Amy Hanna as his attorneys. They planned to file a motion for a new trial within a few months.

In July 2021, a three-judge panel for the 10th Circuit Court of Appeals ruled Exotic should serve a shorter sentence, saying the separate convictions for each man he tried to hire to kill Baskin should have been treated as one by the trial court. A new sentencing hearing was held on January 28, 2022, and was attended by a group of Exotic supporters, some wearing animal-print masks. Baskin testified at the hearing that she was fearful that Exotic would threaten her if released. A federal judge sentenced Exotic to 21 years, a reduction of only one year.

While incarcerated, Exotic wrote his autobiography, Tiger King: The Official Tell-All Memoir, which was released on November 9, 2021. In prison, Exotic has been allowed to use a computer for 30 minutes at a time, so he worked on his book every day.

After the success of the first season of Tiger King, Exotic began to receive a large amount of fan mail. Cardi B attempted to start a GoFundMe to help get Exotic out of prison. Exotic also inspired several Internet memes, most of which were based on his quotes in Tiger King. He also inspired the ongoing "Free Joe Exotic" campaign, started by fans who believed he was wrongly convicted. On March 31, 2020, Donald Trump Jr. posted two Exotic memes to Instagram, the first featuring a face merge of his father Donald Trump with Exotic, and the second featuring Joe Biden's head photoshopped over an image of Exotic with a tiger. Rappers Bfb Da Packman and Sada Baby released a single titled "Free Joe Exotic" in June 2020, calling for Exotic's release.

Exotic was transferred from FMC Fort Worth to Federal Medical Center, Butner in North Carolina in November 2021. He was later moved to FMC Fort Worth and then to FMC in Lexington, Kentucky in July 2026 and is scheduled for release in 2036.

== Personal life ==
Exotic is an ordained minister in the state of Oklahoma and is able to officiate marriages. He obtained his ministerial ordination from the Universal Life Church.

=== Relationships ===
Exotic is gay and has referred to numerous partners as his husbands. He has been legally married three times, and changed his legal name twice to use (or add) his husbands' surnames.

His first known male partner was Brian Rhyne, who died of complications from HIV in 2001. The following year, he started a relationship with Jeffrey Charles 'JC' Hartpence, an event manager who aided him with his traveling animal show. In mid 2003, John Finlay was hired as an employee of the G. W. Zoo and within a month began a relationship with Exotic. By this point, the relationship between Exotic and Hartpence had deteriorated owing to drug and alcohol addiction. It finally ended after Exotic threatened to kill Hartpence and feed his remains to the zoo's largest tiger. Hartpence later woke Exotic up by putting a gun to his head, an action that led to Hartpence's arrest by the local authorities. Hartpence was later convicted of child molestation and first-degree murder.

Travis Maldonado arrived at the zoo in December 2013 and, like Finlay, soon began a relationship with Exotic. Exotic, Maldonado, and Finlay were unofficially married to each other less than a month later in a three-partner wedding ceremony. Exotic and Finlay eventually fell out, and following an incident in the zoo's car park Finlay was arrested and charged with assault and battery. In 2015, Exotic legally wed Maldonado and his legal name became Joseph Maldonado.

On October 6, 2017, Travis Maldonado fatally shot himself at the zoo in front of Joshua Dial, who was Exotic's campaign manager at the time. In his memory, Exotic set up a charity called the Travis Maldonado Foundation, which claimed it would provide "no-cost resources for those struggling with meth addiction and gun-safety education." At Travis's memorial service at the G. W. Zoo, Exotic stated that God put Travis on Earth to make him smile and stated that Travis's testicles "were like golden nuggets" to Travis.

Exotic married Dillon Passage on December 11 of the same year; one of the witnesses was Travis Maldonado's mother. Upon his marriage to Passage, Exotic's legal surname became Maldonado-Passage. According to Passage, Exotic prevented him from making friends at the G. W. Zoo, and also prevented him from spending time with his mother and cousin.

On March 26, Passage revealed on Instagram that he and Exotic were seeking a divorce, but on good terms and that he would continue to have Exotic in his life. Passage announced in July 2021 that he was now in a relationship with a man closer to his age named John. Exotic initially wished the couple well, but stated that he would have liked to have been told by Passage himself rather than TMZ. He later referred to Passage as "a dumbass", and blocked him on Instagram and Twitter following Passage releasing a video exposing Exotic's abusive and controlling behavior during their relationship, where he stated he felt like "another animal in a cage." Exotic and Passage's divorce was finalized in January 2023.

Joe announced his engagement to fellow inmate Jorge Marquez in October 2024. The pair met while in prison, and officially married in April 2025. Marquez was released from prison in May 2025 and was deported to Mexico for illegal entry.

=== Health problems ===
Exotic claims that after wrecking his police cruiser in 1985, he was confined to a hospital for over a month, and then spent several years in rehabilitation. He also said he had four heart attacks during his career as a zookeeper.

In April 2020, there were multiple cases of COVID-19 at Exotic's prison. For safety precautions, Exotic was moved from Grady County Jail in Oklahoma to Federal Medical Center and began a 14-day quarantine. Tiger King fans speculated that Exotic had COVID-19, but Dillon Passage confirmed to fans that he did not.

In January 2021, he was reportedly suffering from an unverified medical condition.

On May 14, 2021, it was reported that Exotic had been diagnosed with prostate cancer, and had approved testing to establish what stage it was in. In August 2021, he said that his prostate cancer might have spread to his pelvis. In November, he said that he had an aggressive form of cancer, and has since been moved to Federal Medical Center, Butner in North Carolina for treatment.

In October 2024, it was reported that Exotic had been quarantined at FMC Fort Worth due to an outbreak of scabies in a housing unit there.

== Filmography ==
=== Television ===
Year	Title	Role	Notes
2011	America's Most Dangerous Pets	Himself	BBC documentary
2016	The Life Exotic: Or the Incredible True Story of Joe Schreibvogel	Himself	J.D. Thompson documentary
2020–2021	Tiger King	Himself	Netflix documentary
2020	Tiger King: What Really Went Down?	Himself (archive footage)	CNN documentary
2020	Surviving Joe Exotic	Himself (archive footage)	Discovery UK documentary
2021	Louis Theroux: Shooting Joe Exotic	Himself (archive footage)	BBC documentary

== Discography ==
- I Saw a Tiger (2014)
- Star Struck (2015)
- Jungle Rhapsody: A Tiger King Experience (2023)
