= Eastvale =

Eastvale may refer to one of several places in the United States:

- Eastvale, California
- Eastvale, Pennsylvania
- Eastvale, Texas
