= Louis Theroux: Shooting Joe Exotic =

- Genre: Documentary film
- Directed by: Jack Rampling
- Starring: Louis Theroux; Joe Exotic; Carole Baskin
- Country of origin: United Kingdom
- Original language: English

Production
- Executive producer: Arron Fellows
- Producers: Emma Whitehead; Cath Boggan
- Production location: United States
- Running time: 90 minutes
- Production company: Mindhouse Productions

Original release
- Network: BBC Two
- Release: 5 April 2021

Related
- America's Most Dangerous Pets

Louis Theroux: Shooting Joe Exotic is a British documentary film presented by Louis Theroux. It was released on 5 April 2021 on BBC Two. The documentary, centred on former zoo owner and convicted felon Joe Exotic, looks back at unseen footage from Theroux's previous documentary that featured Exotic, America's Most Dangerous Pets (2011), and also features Theroux interviewing other people associated with Exotic, including his legal team, former colleagues, his estranged brother and niece, and Howard and Carole Baskin.

== Production ==
On 16 March 2021, it was announced that Louis Theroux had filmed a follow-up to his 2011 documentary film America's Most Dangerous Pets. Theroux traveled to Oklahoma to speak to a team trying to get Joe Exotic out of prison, and spoke to friends and family of Exotic's who haven't spoken on camera before. He also spoke to Howard and Carole Baskin.

The documentary film is directed by Jack Rampling, produced by Emma Whitehead and Cath Boggan, and executive produced by Arron Fellows for Theroux's Mindhouse Productions.
