= Bloxk Party =

2018 single by Sada Baby featuring Drego

Single by Sada Baby featuring Drego

from the album Bartier Bounty
- Released: September 28, 2018
- Genre: Midwestern hip-hop
- Length: 3:27
- Label: Asylum
- Songwriters: Casada Sorrell; Deandre Pearson
- Producer: Jose the Plug

Sada Baby singles chronology
"Freaky Nike" (2018)	"Bloxk Party" (2018)	"Llygmista" (2018)

Drego singles chronology
"Best of Me" (2018)	"Bloxk Party" (2018)	"Can't Believe" (2018)

Music video
- "Bloxk Party" on YouTube

"Bloxk Party" (pronounced "block party") is a song by American rapper Sada Baby featuring American rapper Drego. It was released on March 23, 2018 as a music video and immediately went viral, becoming Sada Baby's breakout hit, following which the song was re-released on September 28, 2018 as the second single from his third mixtape Bartier Bounty (2019).

== Background ==
According to Sada Baby, the song is named in honor of his deceased friend Bloxk, with many of his relatives appearing in the video.

== Content ==
The song has no chorus, and finds the rappers exchanging verses back-and-forth. Among their lyrics, Sada Baby compares a big brick of cocaine to wrestler Brock Lesnar and big shotgun to basketball player Lauri Markkanen, both with respect to appearance, while Drego notably raps "Do you believe in my dreams like Coretta, bitch?"

== Critical reception ==
The song received generally positive reviews. Luke Benjamin of Passion of the Weiss commented that "Sada is kinetic, his synergy with Drego lilting towards some kind of rough alchemy", adding "'Bloxk Party' is the most fulfilled realization of Sada disarming, wily charm. There's seemingly layers of disdain and a voluble sneer in his voice that has already carved out a deep back-catalog — much of it still unengaged with critically. As it is, breakouts often have the side-effect of erasure—years of work obscured by a singular tide." Tom Breihan of Stereogum wrote "If all you know about the Detroit rapper is 'Bloxk Party,' the ridiculously fun 2018 collaboration with fellow Detroit rapper Drego, you would know that Sada Baby could dance. You would know that he could come up with viciously enjoyable punchlines. You would know that he’s an absolute hurricane of berserk, energetic charisma." Harold Bingo of Passion of the Weiss remarked "What is there to say about this song that has not already been said? It is one of the best hookless rap songs of the decade. Drego's opening bar sets the track off perfectly. The delivery of each line makes me relate to stuff that I shouldn't." He called it "a testament to Sada and Drego, because they make all of these bars feel lived in and realistic."

=== Year-end lists ===
Publication	List	Rank	Ref.
The Fader	The 100 Best Songs of 2018	31	
Passion of the Weiss	The Best Rap Songs of 2018	3	

== Music video ==
The music video finds the rappers throwing a party. They are seen standing on a kitchen island, wriggling and dancing, including doing the robot. The clip features cameos from Detroit rappers Beno, BandGang Lonnie Bands and BandGang Masoe.

== Charts ==
Chart (2019)	Peak position
US Mainstream R&B/Hip-Hop Airplay (Billboard)	39

== Certifications ==
Region	Certification	Certified units/sales
United States (RIAA)	Gold	500,000^{‡}
^{‡} Sales+streaming figures based on certification alone.
