= Whole Lotta Choppas =

2020 single by Sada Baby

Single by Sada Baby
- Released: August 14, 2020
- Genre: Miami bass
- Length: 2:33
- Label: Asylum
- Songwriters: Casada Sorrell; Marcus Black; Stephen Gibson; Cecil Glenn
- Producer: CoalCash Blac

Sada Baby singles chronology
"Grande Sangre" (2020)	"Whole Lotta Choppas" (2020)	"Let Me Breathe" (2020)

Music video
- "Whole Lotta Choppas" on YouTube

"Whole Lotta Choppas" is a song by American rapper Sada Baby. It was released on August 14, 2020, through Asylum Records, as the lead single from his upcoming debut album. The song quickly garnered popularity on the video-sharing app TikTok and became Sada Baby's first charting song. It samples Tag Team's 1993 single, "Whoomp! (There It Is)". A remix featuring Nicki Minaj was released on October 16, 2020, with critical praise aimed at her appearance. The remix propelled the song to a new peak of number 35 on the Billboard Hot 100.

== Background ==
The first recording of the song took place nearly two years before its release. Sada said he held it "because I felt it was going to be — I didn't know. I just felt like it was a good enough remake [of] 'Whoomp There It Is'". He decided to release it in anticipation of his debut album. Following its release, "Whole Lotta Choppas" went viral on the video-sharing platform TikTok, thanks to a dance challenge created by the user @ohbukster, resulting in over 5.8 million videos and 1.3 billion sound plays on the platform. Sada also resposted a video of Nathan Apodaca aka @420doggface208 — the TikTok user who garnered popularity for singing along to Fleetwood Mac's "Dreams" — dancing to "Whole Lotta Choppas". By October, the song accumulated over 16 million streams on Spotify. It earned Sada Baby his first entry on the US Billboard Hot 100, debuting at number 93, on the chart dated October 3, 2020. The song was also picked as an anthem during the 2020 NBA Finals. HotNewHipHop's Alex Zidel regarded the track as Sada Baby's "biggest success story".

== Composition ==
According to Sada, his vernacular on "Whole Lotta Choppas" was a result of headaches he was experiencing from the pain of a then recent dental procedure in which he got grills. The slurring of his speech was because of his top teeth and because he "was trying to learn how to speak" with the grills. His headaches persisted with the filming of the song's video in which he was less active than the rest of the cast.
Opposed to the "lighthearted" sampled track, "Whoomp! (There It Is)", "Whole Lotta Choppas" is a sexually explicit track. It has been regarded as an R-rated, "quick moving party cut". It contains a fast-paced, "energetic" beat, and was noted for being reminiscent of the early '90s Miami bass sound. The dance-heavy track is a change in style for Sada, however he still delivers "his signature brand of brash and comedic lyricism", with his "braggadocious bars, wordplay and charismatic delivery".

== Music video ==
The video was shot in Miami and was released on August 20, 2020. It was filmed by 20K Visuals. Inspired by the Freaknik events, the visual sees Sada Baby having a big house party with several models and his Big Squad crew.

== Remix ==
"Whole Lotta Choppas (Remix)"

Single by Sada Baby featuring Nicki Minaj
- Released: October 16, 2020
- Recorded: 2020
- Genre: Miami bass
- Length: 2:53
- Label: Asylum
- Songwriters: Casada Sorrell; Onika Maraj; Stephen Gibson; Cecil Glenn
- Producer: CoalCash Blac

Sada Baby singles chronology
"Gig In Her" (2020)	"Whole Lotta Choppas (Remix)" (2020)	"KrunxhRap Supreme" (2020)

Nicki Minaj singles chronology
"Oh My Gawd" (2020)	"Whole Lotta Choppas (Remix)" (2020)	"What That Speed Bout!?" (2020)

Lyric video
- "Whole Lotta Choppas" (Remix) on YouTube

=== Background and composition ===
The remix marked the first release by Minaj since she gave birth to her first child. It was announced less than a day before its release by both artists via their social medias. The day before, Minaj celebrated her son's birth with an Instagram post. The remix opens with Minaj revealing that she recorded her verse while nine months pregnant. Once she starts rapping, Minaj wishes for a play-date with her son and labelmate Drake's son, Adonis: "I hope one day we do a play-date with Adonis". Drake responded to the line, posting a screenshot of the track on his Instagram Stories, captioning it: "Play dates soon come". The "retro, preppy" track also sees Minaj referencing the Black Lives Matter movement, Burberry, vaping, and basketball player Giannis Antetokounmpo, while Sada Baby delivers his "smooth and raspy" verse. Rolling Stone's Althea Legaspi noted, "Minaj turns up the sultry dance party heat, leading with her two verses and a twist on the hook in the remix". Minaj's lyrics were noted for being reminiscent of her 2014 single "Anaconda", due to her "x-rated" references to her lower region and "edible" underwear.

=== Critical reception ===
Uproxx's Wongo Okon called Minaj's verse "thrilling", and praised her for "floating effortlessly on the track's fast-paced production". The Source's Ebbony "Miss2Bees" Pinillos said Minaj delivers "a fire verse while she's 9 months pregnant". FNR Tigg of Complex stated: "Minaj's presence on a track is always a gift. But, this feature is particularly special because she took time away from being a new mother to bless Sada with a verse". SOHH's Biz Jones said Minaj "slays" on the remix, delivering "hard bars". Chris Murphy of Vulture wrote: "Imagine having a baby and dropping a sick guest verse in the span of two weeks? Only a true Queen could pull that off", pointing out how Minaj "goes on to spit for two minutes straight on the track". Rap-Up said "Over the infectious beat, Nicki proves she hasn't missed a beat", while Nylon's Layla Halabian said Minaj "delivered a salvo that could only come from the queen of rap". Paper's Shaad D'Souza wrote favorably, "Minaj recorded this verse nine months pregnant, and yet it goes harder than anything she's put to tape in recent memory. Let's hope she was joking about her retirement from music — 'Whole Lotta Choppas' says she's still as sharp as ever". Ryan Shepard of Def Pen said the "Detroit-New York connection lives up to the hype", calling the remix "just as fun and upbeat as the original, if not more". Billboard's Jason Lipshutz named it among the most essential releases of the week, calling Sada Baby "wise" for ceding "the first half of the new version to his guest, then comes in, unfurls his own top-notch wordplay and reminds us of the original's magic". The remix was credited for raising Sada Baby's profile.

== Charts ==
=== Remix ===
Chart performance for "Whole Lotta Choppas"
Chart (2020)	Peak position
Canada Hot 100 (Billboard)	91
Global 200 (Billboard)	60
New Zealand Hot Singles (RMNZ)	19
Scottish Singles Sales (Official Charts)	93
UK Download (Official Charts Company)	96
US Billboard Hot 100	35
US Hot R&B/Hip-Hop Songs (Billboard)	12

== Certifications ==
Region	Certification	Certified units/sales
United States (RIAA)	Platinum	1,000,000^{‡}
^{‡} Sales+streaming figures based on certification alone.
