= America's Most Dangerous Pets =

- Starring: Louis Theroux
- Narrated by: Louis Theroux
- Country of origin: United Kingdom
- Original language: English

Production
- Running time: 60 minutes

Original release
- Release: 30 October 2011

Related
- Louis Theroux: Shooting Joe Exotic

Louis Theroux: America's Most Dangerous Pets is a British television documentary film presented by and featuring Louis Theroux. It was first broadcast on 30 October 2011. It was released on Netflix as Beware of the Tiger. It is notable for being the first documentary to feature Joe Exotic, who would later gain worldwide fame as a result of the 2020 Netflix documentary Tiger King.

The programme follows Theroux as he travels to the United States to meet people who own animals normally found in the wild including bears, big cats and dangerous primates. In the programme, Theroux visits GW Exotic Animal Foundation in Oklahoma and meets Joe Exotic.

== See also ==
- Louis Theroux: Shooting Joe Exotic
