= Free Joe Exotic =

2020 single by Bfb Da Packman featuring Sada Baby

Single by Bfb Da Packman featuring Sada Baby

from the album Fat Niggas Need Love Too
- Released: June 7, 2020
- Genre: Hip-hop
- Length: 4:41
- Label: The Lunch Crew Company
- Songwriters: Tyree Thomas; Casada Sorrell
- Producer: Enrgy Beats

Bfb Da Packman singles chronology
"NorthSide Ghetto Soulja" (2020)	"Free Joe Exotic" (2020)	"Made Me Mad" (2020)

Sada Baby singles chronology
"Hit My Shit" (2020)	"Free Joe Exotic" (2020)	"F**k It Up" (2020)

Music video
- "Free Joe Exotic" on YouTube

"Free Joe Exotic" is a song by American rapper Bfb Da Packman featuring American rapper Sada Baby. It was released on June 7, 2020 as the second single from Bfb Da Packman's debut studio album Fat Niggas Need Love Too (2021). It became a viral sensation upon its release and his breakout hit.

== Background ==
Bfb Da Packman described the song as really "organic", "truthful", "messy" and "unorthodox". He said, "It was my breakthrough to let the world to finally know that it's niggas out here with jobs, kids and families... It's niggas out here that really started from the bottom for real and really did this shit. I just needed a feature and Sada Baby was the closest person in my reach. That became the best person in my reach."

The music video of the song was originally planned to be uploaded to YouTube through Half Pint Filmz for free, but the channel was flagged, so Bfb Da Packman released the video through his own channel.

== Content ==
The song largely incorporates self-deprecating humor. It opens with lines about committing crimes ("Trapped the whole winter, scammed for the summer / Came to America with dope in her stomach"), following which Bfb Da Packman wryly expands on various topics, such as hating condoms, preferring to sleep with prostitutes, and his sexual activity. He also briefly calls for the release of Joe Exotic and makes a reference to Toni Braxton.

== Critical reception ==
Tom Breihan of Stereogum commented, "'Free Joe Exotic' might be the first time I've ever seen Sada Baby get upstaged. Sada Baby goes hard on 'Free Joe Exotic,' but the sheer delightful spectacle of Bfb Da Packman overwhelms him." Alphonse Pierre of Pitchfork called the song "one of the best and funniest singles to come out of the red-hot Michigan rap scene in the past couple of years", stating "Every line is absolutely nuts". Jayson Buford of Rolling Stone described the song to be "gloriously playful", writing "And as far as his lyrics go, Packman is at once provocative and self-aware, cartoonishly cutting on himself with lyrics like: 'My bitch 'bout to leave me 'cause I'm built like Patrick/I nut super quick and I be weighin' down the mattress.' His twisted sense of humor, when aimed inward, manages to offer something genuinely refreshing. Rap is a genre of bombast, so it's rare that you get to hear someone be both self-deprecating and dizzyingly clever. It's no wonder that Bfb Da Packman is one of the internet's favorite rappers."

== Music video ==
The music video sees Bfb Da Packman wearing horn-rimmed glasses, a bright orange hoodie that bears the words "STILL HIV POSITIVE", and swim trunks, exposing his belly button in some scenes. He rolls around on the ground, dances by leaning backwards and dangling his arms, and pretends to have sex with a car.

== Certifications ==
Region	Certification	Certified units/sales
United States (RIAA)	Gold	500,000^{‡}
^{‡} Sales+streaming figures based on certification alone.
