= Punchmade Dev =

American rapper (born 2000

- Also known as: OBN Dev; DevTakeFlight
- Born: October 2000 (age 26); North Carolina, U.S.
- Origin: Lexington, Kentucky, U.S.
- Genres: Hip-hop; Detroit rap; scam rap
- Occupations: Rapper, songwriter, record producer
- Years active: 2021–present
- Label: Punchmade Records

Devon Turner (born October 2000) known professionally as Punchmade Dev, is an American rapper, record producer and Youtuber based in Lexington, Kentucky. Best known for the popularization of scam rap, a sub-genre of hip hop, he has produced various songs and videos relating to fraud, such as a "Wire Fraud Tutorial", "Internet Swiping", and "Million Dollar Criminal"

== Legal issues ==
In November 2023, Turner was arrested by the Chicago Police Department and charged with having an obstructed front windshield and carrying a weapon on public property.
