= What That Speed Bout!? =

2020 single by Mike Will Made It, Nicki Minaj and YoungBoy Never Broke Again

Single by Mike Will Made It, Nicki Minaj and YoungBoy Never Broke Again
- Released: November 6, 2020
- Genre: Trap-pop
- Length: 2:51
- Label: EarDrummers; Atlantic
- Songwriters: Michael Williams II; Onika Maraj; Kentrell Gaulden; Kevin Gomringer; Tim Gomringer; Samuel Gloade
- Producers: Mike Will Made It; Cubeatz; 30 Roc

Mike Will Made It singles chronology
"Bang Bang" (2020)	"What That Speed Bout!?" (2020)	"Status" (2020)

Nicki Minaj singles chronology
"Whole Lotta Choppas (Remix)" (2020)	"What That Speed Bout!?" (2020)	"Whole Lotta Money (Remix)" (2021)

YoungBoy Never Broke Again singles chronology
"Bankroll" (2020)	"What That Speed Bout!?" (2020)	"Toxic Punk" (2021)

Music video
- "What That Speed Bout?!" on YouTube

"What That Speed Bout!?" is a song by American music producer Mike Will Made It with Trinidadian-born rapper Nicki Minaj and American rapper YoungBoy Never Broke Again, released on November 6, 2020, as a standalone single. The song received positive reviews from critics, who generally praised the rappers' verses.

"What That Speed Bout!?" gave Mike Will his fourth top 40 hit on the Hot R&B/Hip-Hop Songs chart, debuting and charting at number 11 for one week. It also peaked at numbers 27 and 35 on the Rhythmic and Hot 100 charts, respectively. The song also charted in Canada, reaching number 76 on the Canadian Hot 100 chart. The accompanying music video for the single, directed by Edgar Esteves and Austin McCraken, is a futuristic take on 50 Cent's "In da Club" that sees Mike Will act as a mad scientist building rap cyborgs of Minaj and YoungBoy.

== Background ==
The song was first teased by YoungBoy on August 7, 2020, in a now-deleted Instagram post which showed him on set of the song's video alongside Mike Will and Minaj; he captioned it "What that speed bout". A fan account also shared a snippet of the song, taken from a Mike Will Instagram Live session. On November 3, Minaj took to Instagram to confirm the song's release date and title, posting a photo from the set of the song's music video. Mike Will Made It previously worked with Minaj on the songs "Rake It Up", "Black Barbies", "Runnin", and "Good Form", and "I Lied". YoungBoy had previously paid homage to Minaj, releasing the eponymous 2018 single "Nicki Minaj". He stated in a 2017 interview that he was introduced to Minaj by her ex-boyfriend Meek Mill at their condo. He recalled: "She told me she liked my music". It was released following Mike Will's signing to Atlantic Records.

== Composition ==
"What That Speed Bout!?" is a trap-pop song, with Minaj and YoungBoy trading verses over "squirming" synths backed by a hypnotic, dynamic beat, and a "hard-hitting" rhythm section. YoungBoy performs the chorus and two verses, the first of which finds him ready to please his girlfriend. Minaj meanwhile raps about her body and jewelry, also making a reference to the late Pop Smoke.

== Critical reception ==
Rolling Stone's Jon Blistein opined that Both YoungBoy Never Broke Again and Minaj "are in fine form, peeling off plenty of delightfully outrageous bars", and noted that YoungBoy pulls of off a "clever rhyme" of "Forgiato shoes" and Blue's Clues. Billboard's Rania Aniftos called the song a "fiery collaboration", singling out Minaj for being "fierce as ever". Calling it a "menacing banger", Rap-Up said "the rap queen comes through with another knockout verse". Vulture's Zoe Haylock said Minaj delivers a "fire one-off verse", further stating that in the video, appearing as a bodiless android, she keeps "the focus on her flawless look and fierce bars". Paper's Shaad D'Souza named it a must-hear song, and said "It's a joy to hear two of our wildest, most dexterous rappers atop this Mike Will beat, which itself is a chaotic, clattering delight. The Source's Milcah P. said the song places each collaborator in an impressive light: "On one hand, Mike Will [...] weaves potent basslines with an alluring synth backdrop to add to a catalog of addictive selections. On the other, NBA YoungBoy finds his stride on the commercial effort and makes a strong case for a major crossover opportunity. All the while, Nicki Minaj is unfazed as the new mother hops off a brief hiatus unearthing clever homage". Similarly, Complex's Jessica McKinney noted how both artists delivered: "YoungBoy switches things up, skating over a hype club beat as he raps about coming from the trenches and indulging in late-night activities. Nicki Minaj brings the attitude, laying down gritty bars and finding room to take shots at her ex-boyfriends". Lake Schatz of Consequence of Sound said Mike Will Made It's "winding synths and stabbing percussion make for a listen that alternates between hypnotizing and urgent".

== Music video ==
The song was released with an accompanying music video directed by Edgar Esteves and Austin McCraken. It borrows its plot from 50 Cent's "In da Club" video and incorporates heavy CGI. In the visual, a pregnant Minaj shows off her baby bump in a lime green two-piece set and metallic, sparkling silver thigh-high boots. She sports a "complex" braided hairdo, matching silver jewelry and neon eye shadow. YoungBoy contributes to the futuristic aesthetic in a white vest over a blue and white mesh long sleeve shirt. The video was considered an "analogy for the link between producer and artist", as it finds Mike Will portraying a mad scientist who builds rap cyborgs of Minaj and YoungBoy, the latter receiving superhuman rap abilities. Mike Will also clones both himself and YoungBoy.

== Charts ==
On the week of November 21, 2020, "What That Speed Bout!?" debuted and peaked at numbers 11 and 35 on both the Billboard Hot R&B/Hip-Hop Songs and Hot 100 charts respectively. In Canada, it debuted and peaked at number 76 on the Canadian Hot 100 chart that same week.

Chart (2020–2021)	Peak position
Canada Hot 100 (Billboard)	76
Global 200 (Billboard)	52
US Billboard Hot 100	35
US Hot R&B/Hip-Hop Songs (Billboard)	11
US Rhythmic Airplay (Billboard)	27
