= Teejayx6 =

American rapper (born 2001)

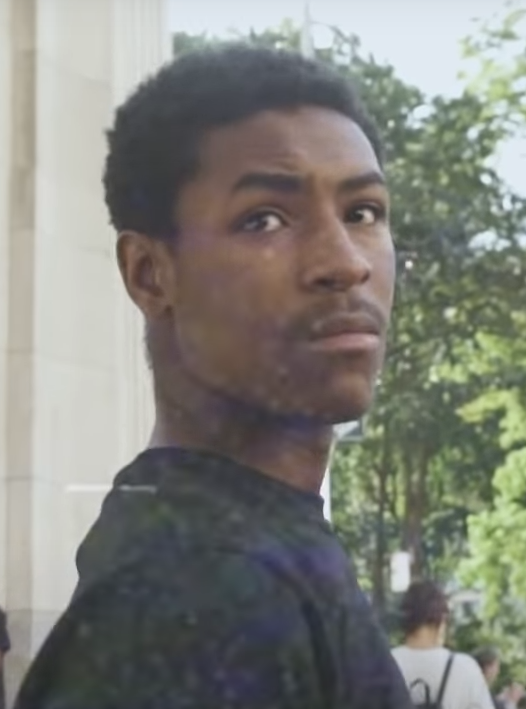

Background information
- Also known as: Teejay Witherspoon
- Born: Dallas Antoino Asberry; August 28, 2001 (age 24)
- Origin: Detroit, Michigan, U.S.
- Genres: Scam rap
- Occupation: Rapper
- Years active: 2017–present
- Labels: The Family; Disruptive; Good Produce
- Producer(s): Lex Luger

Dallas Antoino Asberry (born August 28, 2001), (Note: Different sources list his name as Teejay Witherspoon, Dallas Witherspoon, or Dallas Antoino Karine Asberry) better known by his stage name Teejayx6, is an American rapper. After emerging in the Detroit hip hop scene, he gained recognition for his subject matter of scamming, identity theft and credit card fraud with his 2019 song "Dark Web". He is called the originator of this subgenre, which he refers to as "scam rap."

== Career ==
On June 13, 2019, he released his debut album Under Pressure. On August 13, 2019, he released the video for the single "Swipe Story" after he staged an arrest by the United States Marshals Service for a promotional stunt during a show in Los Angeles, and later staging his "release".

In June 2020, he released "Black Lives Matter," hiring producer TM88 and speaks about the Black Lives Matter movement and how he feels as a Black man in America. The song pays tribute to George Floyd as well.

On December 13, 2019, he released Black Air Force Activity 1, which included the single "Dark Web." In February 2020, he released the single "On Tour" a song written on an airplane while on tour.

In August 2020, he collaborated with NLE Choppa with the single "Punchin." That same month, he released Black Air Force Activity: The Reload. In October, he released the album Spooky, which included the song "Stimulus Package" with Kasher Quon, BandGang Lonnie Bands, Boldy James and the Alchemist.

In an interview with Flaunt Magazine, Teejayx6 cited Lil Wayne and Chief Keef as early influences.

== Discography ==
=== Albums ===
Title	Album details
No Hand Outs (with 10kkev)	Released: December 22, 2017; Label: Good Produce
Under Pressure	Released: June 3, 2019; Label: The Family Entertainment
Fraudulent Activity	Released: July 17, 2019
The Swipe Lessons	Released: September 23, 2019; Label: Disruptive & The Family Entertainment
Black Air Force Activity 1	Released: December 13, 2019; Label: Disruptive & The Family Entertainment
X6	Released: August 15, 2020; Label: Disruptive & The Family Entertainment
Spooky	Released: October 31, 2020; Label: Disruptive & The Family Entertainment
Crime Pays 2	Released: November 20, 2020
Still Scamming	Released: June 7, 2022; Label: Disruptive & The Family Entertainment
Fraudulent	Released: January 13, 2023; Label: The Family Entertainment

Extended plays
Title	EP details
Crime Pays	Released: March 29, 2019
Miami Sessions	Released: June 2, 2019
Only Took 2 Days	Released: June 15, 2019
Out The Mud	Released: July 6, 2019
2020	Released: January 1, 2020; Label: The Family Entertainment
Generation Scam (with Lex Luger)	Released: April 30, 2021; Label: The Family Entertainment
