= Scam rap =

Hip hop subgenre with lyrics focused on fraud

- Stylistic origins: Hip hop; trap
- Cultural origins: 2010s, Detroit, Michigan, US

Scam rap is a subgenre of hip-hop music that emerged in Detroit during the mid to late 2010s. It is characterized by lyrics that focus on various forms of fraudulent activities, particularly those conducted in the digital realm, such as online scams, hacking, the dark web and cybercrime. Artists like Punchmade Dev, Teejayx6 and BabyTron are largely credited with popularizing the subgenre.

== Characteristics ==
Scam rap is notable for its explicit descriptions of various fraudulent activities, offering listeners a glimpse into the world of cybercrime, financial manipulation, and identity theft. Artists often share step-by-step instructions, anecdotes, and personal experiences related to their scams. The lyrics often reflect a mix of audacity and humor, showcasing the artists' resourcefulness and creativity in executing their schemes.

Musically, scam rap typically incorporates lazy, triplet flows and rambling bars, often rapped "behind the beat". The beats themselves may be lo-fi and minimalistic, allowing the focus to remain on the storytelling aspect of the genre. Scam rap also frequently features references to modern technology, cryptocurrency, online platforms, and the dark web, reflecting the evolving landscape of scams in the digital age.

== History and origins ==
Scam rap can be traced back to Atlanta rap, in which the words "jugg" (also spelled "jug" or "juug") and "finesse" were used by rappers like the Migos and Yung Ralph to refer to scams, vaguely, and it wouldn't be until Detroit's overhaul of scam rap that specifically scam-related lyrics were introduced into the genre. Originally, "jugg" was a general term for a theft of money, usually in the context of a robbery, but it has also been used to refer to a confidence trick, especially in the modern Detroit-dominated scam rap scene. Scam rap dates back as early as the 2011 Migos song "Juug Season", which has a chorus consisting of the words "jugg" and "finesse". A notable milestone in the genre's emergence is the release of the song "Juggin Ain't Dead" by Bossman Rich in March 2017.

Detroit rapper Teejayx6 is widely regarded as one of the leading figures in scam rap. He gained prominence with his mixtape "Fraudulent Activity," which featured tracks that delved into the specifics of various scams and offered listeners insights into the mechanics of fraud. Teejayx6's music often includes hyper-specific lyrics and step-by-step instructions for carrying out scams.

The scam rap genre has since expanded to include other artists such as BabyTron, Punchmade Dev, Guapdad 4000, Selfmade Kash, and City Girls. These artists have released tracks that explore different aspects of scamming, showcasing its various facets and creative approaches.

== Controversy ==
Despite its popularity, scam rap has faced controversies due to its subject matter. Some artists within the genre, including Selfmade Kash and City Girls member JT, have faced legal issues related to their involvement in fraudulent activities. In 2023, rapper G Herbo was arrested for conspiracy to commit wire fraud and aggravated identity theft. The identity theft charges were dropped after he pleaded guilty to conspiracy to commit wire fraud and was fined $140,000. Scam rapper Punchmade Dev's single "Wire Fraud Tutorial", which instructed the listener on how to commit wire fraud, was removed from YouTube due to violating its terms of service.
