= Eastvale, Texas =

Former municipality in Texas, United States

Coordinates: 33°06′19″N 96°53′50″W

Eastvale was an incorporated municipality in Denton County, Texas, United States. It was situated along FM 423, just east of Lewisville Lake in southeastern Denton County.

Eastvale was incorporated in the mid-1970s and the population stood at 503 in the 1980 census. After a brief period as a distinct community, the town began a consolidation process with the neighboring city of The Colony in 1987. By that time, the population was estimated at 643. On April 7, 1987, Eastvale citizens voted 75–71 in favor of consolidation. In order for the process to proceed, voters in The Colony had to support the measure as well. Residents of The Colony went to the polls on August 8 and of the 1,266 votes that were cast in that election, 999 (78.9%) favored consolidation. Soon after, Eastvale became part of the city of The Colony.

Prior to the consolidation, Eastvale did not have a police department and was policed by the Denton County Sheriff's Office. The Colony was incorporated and so had its own Police department. At the time of consolidation, The Colony's police department assumed law enforcement duties over Eastvale as well.

It has been claimed that Joseph "Joe Exotic" Schreibvogel, who became infamous in 2020 when he was featured in the Netflix true crime miniseries Tiger King, was the chief of Eastvale's police department.
