= Sada Baby =

American rapper (born 1992)

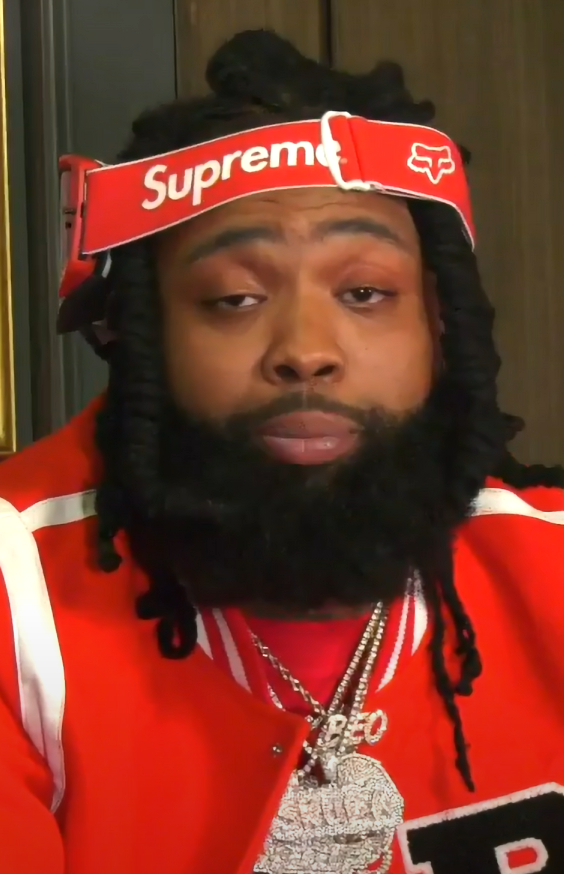
- Sada Baby in 2022

Background information
- Also known as: Skuba Steve
- Born: Casada Aaron Sorrell; November 17, 1992 (age 33); Detroit, Michigan, U.S.
- Genres: Michigan rap; trap
- Occupations: Rapper; singer
- Years active: 2013–present
- Labels: Asylum; Sada Baby; TF Entertainment; TSF; Big Squad
- Website: sada-baby.com

Casada Aaron Sorrell (born November 17, 1992), known professionally as Sada Baby, is an American rapper and singer. He initially gained recognition in 2018 when the music video for his song "Bloxk Party" went viral, the success of which led him to sign with Asylum Records. A prominent figure of the emerging Detroit rap scene of the mid-to-late 2010s, he is best known for the 2020 single "Whole Lotta Choppas" (remixed featuring Nicki Minaj), which went viral on TikTok before peaking at number 35 on the Billboard Hot 100. His debut studio album Skuba Sada 2 (2020) entered the US Billboard 200, and didn't feature the single.

== Early life ==
Casada Sorrell was born and raised in the Regent Park neighborhood on the east side of Detroit. According to him, he sang in the church choir from the age of nine to eleven, but then moved to Washington, D.C. for a year. He grew up with dreams of playing basketball, and took interest in music after his cousin Ashley started singing.

== Career ==
=== 2013–2017: Career beginnings ===
In 2013, Sada Baby began taking rapping seriously and cultivated a following. He released numerous songs and was featured on a number of tracks in the next three years, but received little attention. He nearly quit in 2016 until entering and winning a local rap competition, beating out 12 other rappers and earning money. Sada began releasing a series of singles and music on YouTube, culminating in the release of his breakout debut mixtape, Skuba Sada, in 2017. That same year, he also signed to his friend Tee Grizzley's record label Grizzley Gang, and released another mixtape called D.O.N - Dat One Nigga.

=== 2018–2019: Breakthrough, "Bloxk Party" and mixtapes ===
In March 2018, Sada Baby released the video for his song "Bloxk Party", a collaboration with fellow Detroit rapper Drego. A few months after his breakthrough, Sada Baby signed to Asylum Records. "Bloxk Party" was released again on September 28, 2018, as the second single for his third mixtape Bartier Bounty, which Baby would release on January 25, 2019, under Asylum. The mixtape also contains his 2018 singles "Cheat Code, "Pimp Named Drip Dat" and "Driple Double", and met with positive reviews from music critics. On August 16, 2019, Sada released his song "Next Up" featuring Tee Grizzley. On September 27, 2019, he released his fourth mixtape Whoop Tape via SoundCloud and DatPiff. On November 1, 2019, he released a single titled "2K20". Sada Baby eventually left Grizzley Gang, due to being restricted from releasing music at the prolific rate he was accustomed to, in 2019.

=== 2020–present: "Whole Lotta Choppas" ===
On January 1, 2020, he released his mixtape Brolik, a DatPiff exclusive and a collection of singles he released in the last six months. On January 10, 2020, he released his song "Pressin", featuring rapper King Von. In March 2020, Sada released his debut studio album, Skuba Sada 2, which contains his 2020 single "Aktivated". The deluxe edition features the singles "2K20" and "Pressin". The album received generally positive reviews, and charted at number 125 on Billboard 200. On June 7, 2020, Sada Baby was featured on fellow Michigan rapper Bfb Da Packman's single "Free Joe Exotic". On July 17, 2020, he announced his mixtape Bartier Bounty 2, and released it a week later. On August 14, 2020, Sada Baby released the single "Whole Lotta Choppas", which sparked a viral dance challenge on TikTok and debuted at number 92 on the Billboard Hot 100. On October 16, 2020, a remix of the song featuring Nicki Minaj was released. The song later peaked at number 35.

== Personal life ==
On January 9, 2025, Sada Baby was pulled over after his Dodge Ram was found to have a tinted window, and was then arrested on the spot after it was discovered that he had been driving without a driver's license since 2020. A warrant for his arrest on this charge had originally been issued in October 2023. Sada Baby would then be taken to Macomb County jail. He was soon released, but was expected to make a court appearance on this charge on January 24, 2025. He also found to be in possession of "possible illegal contraband," though charges were not filed for this as of January 10, 2025. The contraband would be taken as evidence, with charges remaining a possibility pending further investigation.

Sada Baby is missing part of his left index finger due to a robbery incident in the past.

== Discography ==
=== Studio albums ===
List of studio albums, with selected details
Title	Album details	Peak chart positions
Title	Album details	US
Skuba Sada 2	Released: March 19, 2020; Label: Asylum; Format: Digital download, streaming	125

=== Mixtapes ===
List of mixtapes, with selected details
Title	Mixtape details	Peak chart positions
Title	Mixtape details	US Heat.
Skuba Sada	Released: April 7, 2017; Label: TF Entertainment; Format: Digital download, streaming	—
D.O.N - Dat One Nigga	Released: November 17, 2017; Label: Sada Baby; Format: Digital download, streaming	—
Bartier Bounty	Released: January 25, 2019; Label: Asylum; Format: Digital download, streaming	—
Whoop Tape	Released: September 27, 2019; Label: Independent	—
Brolik	Released: January 1, 2020; Label: Independent	—
Bartier Bounty 2	Released: July 24, 2020; Label: Asylum; Format: Digital download, streaming	4
The Lost Tapes	Released: August 6, 2021; Label: Big Squad LLC.; Format: Digital download, streaming	—
Bartier Bounty 3	Released: February 18, 2022; Label: Big Squad LLC.; Format: Digital download, streaming	—
Skuba Sada 2.5	Released: June 10, 2022; Label: Asylum; Format: Digital download, streaming	—

=== Singles ===
List of singles showing year released, chart positions and album name
Title	Year	Peak chart positions			Album	Certification
Title	Year	US	US R&B/HH	US Rap	Album	Certification
"Bloxk Party" (featuring Drego)	2018	— (Note: "Bloxk Party" did not enter the Billboard Hot 100, but peaked at number 39 on the Mainstream R&B/Hip-Hop chart.)	—	—	Bartier Bounty	* RIAA: Gold
"Aktivated"	2019	—	—	—	Skuba Sada 2	* RIAA: Gold
"Pressin" (with King Von)	2020	—	—	—	Skuba Sada 2	* RIAA: Gold
"Whole Lotta Choppas" (solo or remix featuring Nicki Minaj)	2020	35	12	11		* RIAA: Platinum
"—" denotes a title that did not chart, or was not released in that territory.

=== Guest appearances ===
List of non-single guest appearances, with other performing artists, showing year released and album name
Title	Year	Other artist(s)	Album
"Corey Brewer"	2016	Ace Cino	I Can't Fall Off 2
"Bag Flipper"	2017	Eastside ReUp, Damn Jon Boi, DameDot, Wayne Go Cr8z	How U Love Dat 2
"I Really Mean That"	2017	Eastside ReUp, Damn Jon Boi	How U Love Dat 2
"You Just Talk Shit"	2017	Tay B	AFLN
"What U Do Today"	2017	Kook the Kashcow	Buff Whelanton
"Jordan Vs Bird"	2017	Kook the Kashcow	Buff Whelanton
"Over Time"	2017	Damn Jon Boi	Number 23
"You Know What It Is"	2017	ShredGang Mone, ShredGang Boogz	SideShow Bob
"Spyder"	2017	Ballout, Chief Keef	Can't Ban Da GloMan
"Tripple Over Time"	2017	Damn Jon Boi, Eastside ReUp, GT, Chu Chu Dabbing, Von Jose	The Number 24
"Winning"	2017	Damn Jon Boi, Eastside ReUp, GT	The Number 24
"On Purpose"	2017	Dboy Slim, Lil Mike Mike	Respected and Connected
"U.D.W.N"	2017	FMB DZ	I Ain't Gone Lie
"Message"	2017	FMB DZ, Bandgang Masoe	I Ain't Gone Lie
"Yesterday"	2017	FMB DZ	The Gift
"The Field"	2017	FMB DZ	Washington DZ
"90's Baby"	2017	Que	Class Clown
"Leg Work"		Lonnie Bands	n/a
"25 Rounds"	2018	Paperlovee	n/a
"Tell Her To"	2018	Lando Bando, Eastside ReUp	THHL the Album
"Like This Song"	2018	RLSG KD, Babyface Ray, GT	Trap Lives Matter
"Say It Then"	2018	FMB DZ	The Gift 2
"Fidgeting"	2018	Teflon Twaun, DaBoii, Nef the Pharaoh	Untouched
"Still Fuckin Wid It"	2018	Teflon Twaun, Salsalino	Untouched
"My Dawg"	2018	Eastside ReUp	Yo Favorite Rapper Favorite Trapper
"The Pack Attack"	2018	E-40, FMB DZ	The Gift of Gab
"Google My Name"	2018	Mazerati Ricky	Rich Reallionaire
"Hot 107.5"	2018	Oba Rowland	Northland
"New Bmf"	2018	SauceGod80, Tay Blood	Detroit State of Mind
"Dirty Dancing"	2018	SauceGod80	Detroit State of Mind
"Plug Luv"	2018	SauceGod80, Eastside ReUp, FMB DZ	Detroit State of Mind
"Bag Drop"	2018	Choose Up Cheese, FMB DZ, Tooda Man	n/a
"Big Dawg"	2018	Almighty Jmoney, OMB Peezy	n/a
"How"	2019	Bandgang Javar	Great Lake Ruler
"Weird"	2019	Lonnie Bands, Bandgang Masoe, ShredGang Mone	KOD
"Just My Luck"	2019	Mozzy	Internal Affairs
"One Me"	2019	OMB Peezy	Preacher to the Streets
"Big Dawg Status" (Remix)	2019	Philthy Rich, FMB DZ, Lil Durk, Que	The Remixes 3
"Print This Money"	2019	AOC Obama	Obamacare 3
"Pimp Shit"	2019	Trae Pound, YFN Lucci	Heat Tape 2
"Start This Bitch Over"	2019	Skilla Baby	Push That Shit Out Skilla
"Left Me in the Mud"	2019	Nef the Pharaoh	Mushrooms & Coloring Books
"3 Spots"	2019	Nephew Texas Boy, FMB DZ	n/a
"Shoot Front the Reverend"	2019	ShooterGang Kony	Second Hand Smoke
"Baw Baw"	2019	Fredo Bang	Big Ape
"2 Fa 5"	2019	Eastside ReUp	All Hustle No Luck 2
"762's"	2019	Eastside ReUp, FMB DZ	All Hustle No Luck 2
"No Scale"	2020	Yung LB	Quarter Pound the QP
"Louis V Umbrella"	2020	Slayter	—N/a
"Carmelo Bryant"	2020	Skilla Baby	Crack Music
"I Knew This Would Happen"	2020	Lando Bando	I Knew This Would Happen
"Smoke"	2020	GT	Timeless
"Talk My Shit"	2020	FMB DZ	The Gift 3
"Dripple Dragons"	2020	FMB DZ	The Gift 3
"Mobsters"	2020	YS, RonRonTheProducer	Street Icons
"Across the Map"	2020	03 Greedo, RonRonTheProducer	Load It Up
"Talk VI"	2020	NaybaHood VI	—N/a
"Tour"	2020	Blueface, Asian Doll, Glokk 9, NLE Choppa, Kiddo Curry	—N/a
"Not Regular"	2020	Lil Yachty	—N/a
"Friday Night Cypher"	2020	Big Sean, Tee Grizzley, Kash Doll, Cash Kidd, Payroll, 42 Dugg, Boldy James, Drego, Royce da 5'9", Eminem	Detroit 2
"Do My Dance"	2020	DBIZZ	TBA
"Slide On Em"	2020	Hardo	TRAPN FEVER 2
"Big Steppa"	2020	Fredo Bang	TBA
"Captain Crunch"	2021	Trippie Redd, Babyface Ray, Icewear Vezzo	Trip at Knight
"SPRAY"	2025	Dream Beard	N/A
"VOID"	2026	Dream Beard	N/A
