= Hotel Benton =

Building in Corvallis, Oregon, U.S.

- U.S. National Register of Historic Places
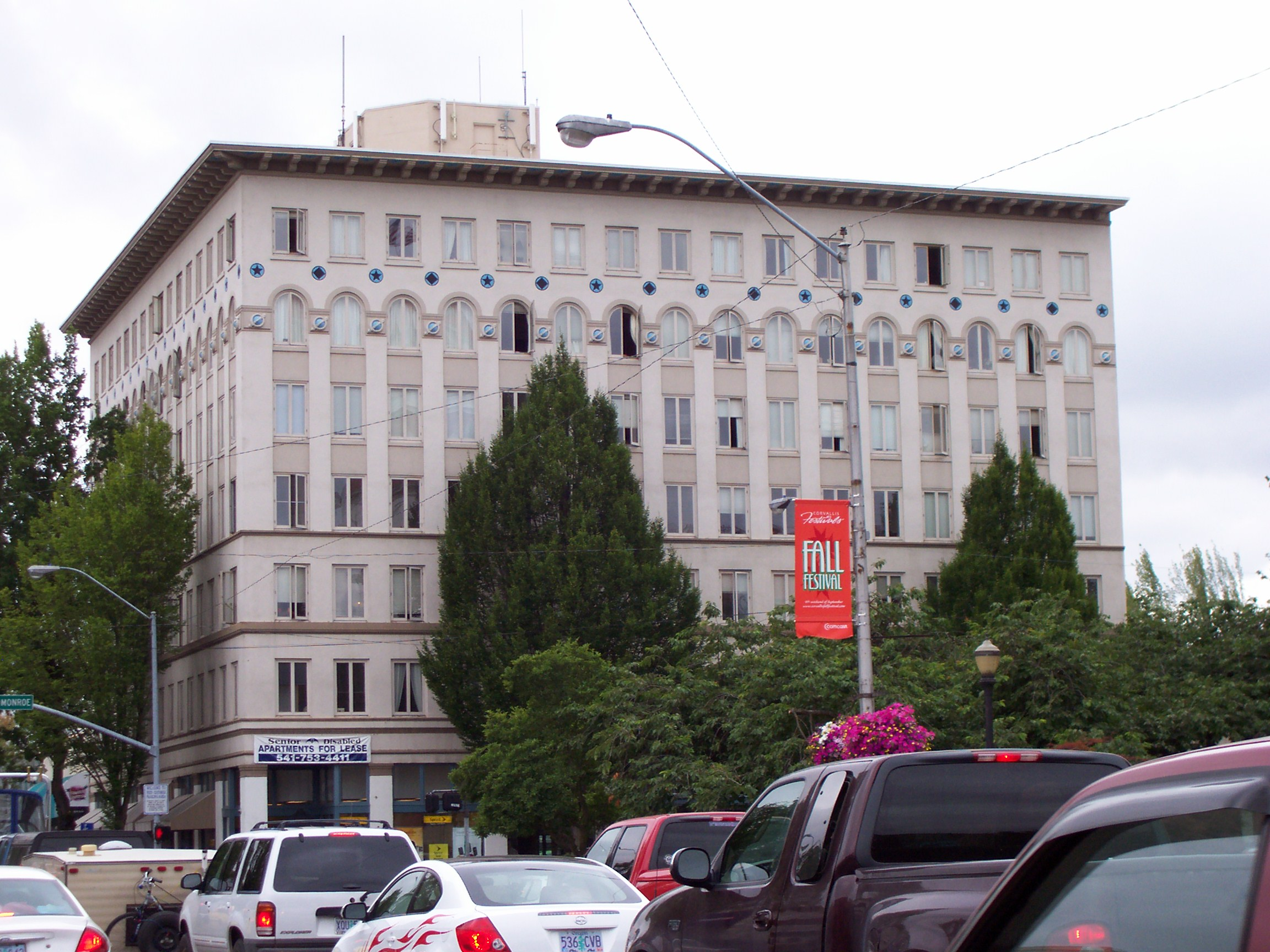
- The building's exterior in 2009
- Location: 408 SW Monroe Avenue; Corvallis, Oregon
- Coordinates: 44°33′52″N 123°15′45″W
- Area: Less than 1 acre (0.40 ha)
- Built: 1925
- Built by: Lou N. Traver
- Architect: Houghtaling & Dougan
- Architectural style: Renaissance Revival
- NRHP reference No.: 82003719
- Added to NRHP: May 20, 1982

The Hotel Benton, or Benton Hotel, (Note: Important sources differ regarding the form of the hotel's name. Databases from the National Park Service (NPS) and Oregon State Historic Preservation Office list the name as "Benton Hotel", but the NPS's official National Register listing announcement uses "Hotel Benton". The National Register nomination documentation for the hotel gives "Hotel Benton" as the historic name and "Benton Hotel" as the common name. This article adopts "Hotel Benton" because the historic name emphasizes the historic significance of the hotel, and because the nomination form and Federal Register announcement are sources of a more foundational nature than the databases.) is a historic former hotel in Corvallis, Oregon, United States. Constructed from 1924 to 1925, the building represents a distinctive example of the Italian Renaissance style by Portland architects Houghtaling and Dougan. It is one of several Oregon buildings the firm designed in the revival styles popular in the 1920s and 1930s. (Note: Other Renaissance Revival examples by Houghtaling and Dougan include Portland's Elks Temple and Medical Arts Building.)

== History ==
=== Background ===
After the decline of the Julian Hotel and other earlier establishments during the first years of the 20th Century, the small college town of Corvallis, Oregon found itself without a suitable modern hotel for visiting guests. Several proposals were floated by community leaders for construction of a new "first class, modern, fireproof" hotel during the first half of the 1920s, without success. In the spring of 1924 the development of a modern downtown hotel was undertaken as a project by the local Kiwanis club, headed by President Ralph Lyman Bosworth, in the effort to establish an important public asset for the growing community.

A committee of 7, headed by Bosworth and including bankers, an attorney, and newspaper publisher Claude Ingalls, was established as the Benton Hotel Corporation as a legal coordinating body for the project. These worked together with other local business and community leaders doing the initial planning work to get the project off the ground.

Reflecting the progressive spirit of the early 1920s, this proposal was largely financed through public subscription and carried out by local contractors with a stake in the success of the project. Some 167 members of the community committed to the loan of $90,000 at 5 percent interest to provide half the financing for the project, with a like amount generated by a 6.5 percent bond floated in Portland by financiers there. Additional loan subscriptions made possible the total cost of construction, $250,000.

This funding allowed for the construction of the planned 7 story concrete and steel edifice, complete with 120 rooms, over half of which contained either a shower or a bath. Floors were laid in concrete and partition walls covered with tile, making the building quiet and relatively safe from the danger of fire.

Construction of the building began in 1924 and was completed during the first half of 1925. Approximately 95 percent of the work on the building was carried out by Corvallis contractors and construction workers.

=== Opening ===
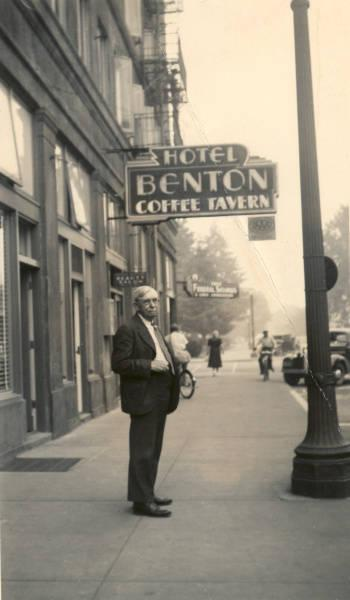
Hotel Benton, coffee tavern, c. 1935

The hotel opened to the public on June 1, 1925. The opening was promoted with the printing of 50,000 letters of announcement, which were systematically mailed out to business leaders around the state, including a mailing by the dean of the Pharmacy department of Oregon Agricultural College to the state's pharmacists and another sent to every banker in Oregon in conjunction with a planned meeting there.

Salem hotelery operator A.N. Pierce, previously a manager of the Seward Hotel in Portland, was selected as the manager of the new facility.

With its prominent location across the street from the Benton County Courthouse and one block from the train station, its visibility, and its design, the Hotel Benton became a social and business hub of Corvallis for more than 30 years.

=== Decline and repurposing ===
The hotel's fortunes began to suffer after the termination of passenger rail service in the 1940s, and especially with the later rise of auto-oriented motels outside the downtown core. By the 1980s, the building was in use for low-income public housing.

=== National Register of Historic Places listing ===
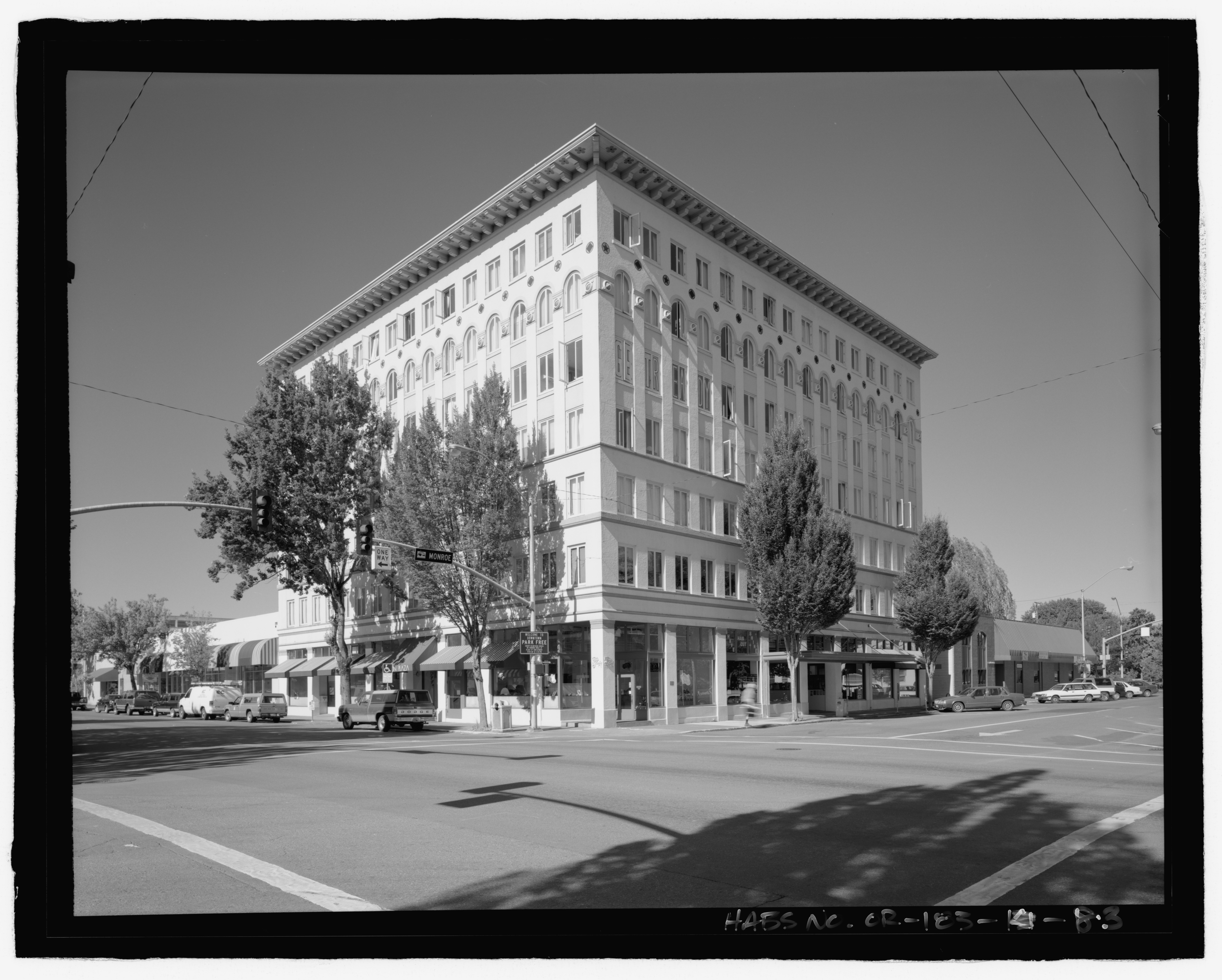
Perspective view of the hotel's exterior, 2001

The hotel building was added to the National Register of Historic Places in 1982.

== See also ==
- Dr. Ralph Lyman Bosworth House
- National Register of Historic Places listings in Benton County, Oregon
