= National Register of Historic Places listings in Benton County, Oregon =

Location of Benton County in Oregon

This list presents the full set of buildings, structures, objects, sites, or districts designated on the National Register of Historic Places in Benton County, Oregon, United States, and offers brief descriptive information about each of them. The National Register recognizes places of national, state, or local historic significance across the United States. Out of over 90,000 National Register sites nationwide, Oregon is home to over 2,000, and 57 of those are found in Benton County.

This National Park Service list is complete through NPS recent listings posted October 2, 2026.

== Current listings ==
	Name on the Register	Image	Date listed	Location	City or town	Description
1	Avery–Helm Historic District	Avery–Helm Historic District	January 27, 2000 (#99001716)	Roughly bounded by SW 2nd, 6th, and Jefferson Streets, and the Highway 20/34 Bypass; 44°33′32″N 123°15′58″W	Corvallis	Located on several of Corvallis's earliest plats, the historic houses in this residential district present a window into the domestic aspects of the city's development from 1870 to 1949, providing a full industrial, socioeconomic, and architectural profile of that period.
2	Benton County Courthouse	Benton County Courthouse	January 30, 1978 (#78002278)	NW 4th St. between Jackson and Monroe Sts. 44°33′55″N 123°15′44″W	Corvallis	
3	Benton County State Bank Building	Benton County State Bank Building	March 7, 1979 (#79002035)	155 SW Madison Ave. 44°33′48″N 123°15′31″W	Corvallis	
4	George W. Bethers House	George W. Bethers House	August 12, 1997 (#97000590)	225 N. 8th St. 44°32′30″N 123°22′30″W	Philomath	
5	John Bexell House	John Bexell House	February 26, 1992 (#92000064)	3009 NW Van Buren Ave. 44°34′15″N 123°17′06″W	Corvallis	
6	Dr. Ralph Lyman Bosworth House	Dr. Ralph Lyman Bosworth House	December 9, 1981 (#81000471)	833 NW Buchanan Ave. 44°34′32″N 123°15′34″W	Corvallis	
7	J. R. Bryson House	J. R. Bryson House	November 15, 1979 (#79002036)	242 NW 7th St. 44°34′03″N 123°15′47″W	Corvallis	
8	Burnap–Rickard House	Burnap–Rickard House	August 1, 1984 (#84002931)	518 SW 3rd St. 44°33′36″N 123°15′48″W	Corvallis	
9	Camp Arboretum Sign Shop	Camp Arboretum Sign Shop	June 25, 2008 (#08000544)	8592–8399 NW Peavy Arboretum; 44°39′22″N 123°13′58″W	Corvallis vicinity	
10	Jesse H. Caton House	Jesse H. Caton House	September 27, 1979 (#79002037)	602 NW 4th St. 44°34′12″N 123°15′30″W	Corvallis	
11	Children's Farm Home School	Children's Farm Home School	March 25, 2008 (#08000254)	4455 US 20 NE; 44°36′34″N 123°12′54″W	Corvallis vicinity	
12	College Hill West Historic District	College Hill West Historic District	August 1, 2002 (#02000827)	Roughly bounded by NW Johnson, Polk, Arnold and 36th 44°34′15″N 123°17′09″W	Corvallis	A historic district built between the 1910s and 1940s near Oregon State University. Many OSU professors lived in this neighborhood.
13	Corvallis Hotel	Corvallis Hotel	September 10, 1987 (#87001533)	201–211 SW Second St. 44°33′47″N 123°15′32″W	Corvallis	
14	Crystal Lake Cemetery	Crystal Lake Cemetery	June 16, 2004 (#04000613)	1945 SE Crystal Lake Dr. 44°32′52″N 123°15′12″W	Corvallis	
15	Episcopal Church of the Good Samaritan	Episcopal Church of the Good Samaritan	September 10, 1971 (#71000677)	700 SW Madison Ave. 44°33′52″N 123°15′54″W	Corvallis	Carpenter Gothic church built in 1889. Became the Corvallis Arts Center in 1960s, was moved to current location in 1970.
16	J. Leo Fairbanks House	J. Leo Fairbanks House	February 14, 1985 (#85000290)	316 NW 32nd 44°34′16″N 123°17′13″W	Corvallis	
17	Dr. George R. Farra House	Dr. George R. Farra House	December 9, 1981 (#81000472)	660 SW Madison Ave. 44°33′52″N 123°15′51″W	Corvallis	1903 house on the south side of Central Park
18	John Fiechter House	John Fiechter House	April 11, 1985 (#85000789)	Finley Road, William L. Finley National Wildlife Refuge; 44°25′11″N 123°19′28″W	Corvallis vicinity	
19	First Congregational Church	First Congregational Church	December 9, 1981 (#81000473)	760 SW Madison Avenue; 44°33′52″N 123°16′00″W	Corvallis	
20	Fort Hoskins Site	Fort Hoskins Site	May 1, 1974 (#74001672)	38150 Hoskins Road; 44°40′37″N 123°27′43″W	Kings Valley	
21	Charles Gaylord House	Charles Gaylord House	June 21, 1991 (#91000805)	600 NW Seventh St. 44°34′14″N 123°15′47″W	Corvallis	
22	Hannah and Eliza Gorman House	Hannah and Eliza Gorman House	February 24, 2015 (#15000045)	641 NW 4th Street; 44°34′12″N 123°15′32″W	Corvallis	
23	Hadley–Locke House	Hadley–Locke House	December 21, 1981 (#81000474)	704 NW 9th St. 44°34′19″N 123°15′48″W	Corvallis	
24	Harris Bridge	Harris Bridge	November 29, 1979 (#79002040)	W of Wren; 44°34′48″N 123°27′37″W	Wren	
25	Hayden Bridge	Hayden Bridge	November 29, 1979 (#79002034)	W of Alsea; 44°23′00″N 123°37′47″W	Alsea	
26	Helm–Hout House	Helm–Hout House	June 6, 1985 (#85001176)	844 SW 5th St. 44°33′26″N 123°16′02″W	Corvallis	
27	Hotel Benton (Note: Important sources differ regarding the form of the Hotel Benton's name. Databases from the National Park Service (NPS) and Oregon State Historic Preservation Office list the name as "Benton Hotel", but the NPS's official National Register listing announcement in the Federal Register uses "Hotel Benton". The National Register nomination documentation for the hotel gives "Hotel Benton" as the historic name and "Benton Hotel" as the common name. This article adopts "Hotel Benton" because the historic name emphasizes the historic significance of the hotel, and because the nomination form and Federal Register announcement are sources of a more foundational nature than the databases.)	Hotel Benton	May 20, 1982 (#82003719)	408 SW Monroe Ave. 44°33′52″N 123°15′45″W	Corvallis	This hotel building is a distinctive example of the Italian Renaissance style by architects Houghtaling and Dougan. Reflecting the progressive spirit of the early 1920s, the hotel was financed through public subscription and built by local contractors. Opening in 1925, it became social and business center of Corvallis for over 30 years.
28	Hull–Oakes Lumber Company	Hull–Oakes Lumber Company	August 2, 1996 (#96000869)	23837 Dawson Rd. 44°22′N 123°25′W	Monroe	The last steam powered saw mill in the U.S.
29	Independent School	Independent School	May 28, 2013 (#13000332)	25381 SW Airport Avenue; 44°29′45″N 123°21′40″W	Philomath	
30	Irish Bend Covered Bridge No. 14169	Irish Bend Covered Bridge No. 14169	March 27, 2013 (#13000117)	SW Campus Way Bike Path; 44°34′00″N 123°18′03″W	Corvallis	Previously listed on the National Register in 1979, and removed in 1989 upon relocation from the Monroe vicinity to Oregon State University property in Corvallis.
31	Richard S. Irwin Barn	Richard S. Irwin Barn	July 7, 1988 (#88000954)	26208 Finley Refuge Rd. 44°23′57″N 123°18′15″W	Corvallis vicinity	
32	Julian Hotel	Julian Hotel	March 22, 1984 (#84002933)	105 SW 2nd St. 44°33′50″N 123°15′30″W	Corvallis	
33	Charles King House	Charles King House	June 1, 1990 (#90000833)	22930 Harris Rd. 44°34′47″N 123°27′38″W	Philomath vicinity	
34	Isaac King House and Barn	Isaac King House and Barn	October 29, 1975 (#75001579)	N of Philomath off OR 223; 44°40′10″N 123°25′37″W	Kings Valley	
35	Lewis G. Kline Building	Lewis G. Kline Building	February 27, 1986 (#86000293)	146 SW 2nd St. 44°33′48″N 123°15′33″W	Corvallis	
36	Lewis G. Kline House	Lewis G. Kline House	December 9, 1981 (#81000475)	308 NW 8th St. 44°34′05″N 123°15′51″W	Corvallis	
37	Lewisburg Hall and Warehouse Company Building	Lewisburg Hall and Warehouse Company Building	June 19, 1991 (#91000804)	6000 NE Elliott Cir. 44°37′54″N 123°14′21″W	Lewisburg	
38	Monroe State Bank Building	Monroe State Bank Building	February 26, 1992 (#92000065)	190 S. Fifth St. 44°18′55″N 123°17′51″W	Monroe	
39	North Palestine Baptist Church	North Palestine Baptist Church	September 30, 2013 (#13000804)	7300 NE Arnold Avenue (approx.); 44°40′16″N 123°12′50″W	Adair Village	
40	Oregon State University Historic District	Oregon State University Historic District	June 25, 2008 (#08000546)	Monroe and Orchard Ave., 30th St., Washington Wy., Jefferson Ave., 11th St. 44°33′56″N 123°16′39″W	Corvallis	Boundary decrease approved October 20, 2021
41	Dr. Henry S. Pernot House	Dr. Henry S. Pernot House	April 29, 1982 (#82003720)	242 SW 5th St. 44°33′48″N 123°15′51″W	Corvallis	
42	Philomath College	Philomath College	December 11, 1972 (#72001078)	Main St. 44°32′30″N 123°22′10″W	Philomath	
43	Pi Beta Phi Sorority House	Pi Beta Phi Sorority House	June 14, 1982 (#82003721)	3002 NW Harrison Blvd. 44°34′18″N 123°17′06″W	Corvallis	
44	Poultry Building and Incubator House	Poultry Building and Incubator House	August 16, 2006 (#06000725)	800 SW Washington Ave. 44°33′42″N 123°16′06″W	Corvallis	
45	Peter Rickard Farmstead	Peter Rickard Farmstead	September 15, 1983 (#83002142)	SW of Corvallis; 44°26′53″N 123°21′15″W	Corvallis vicinity	
46	Charles L. Schuster House	Charles L. Schuster House	October 9, 1986 (#86002843)	228 NW 28th St. 44°34′13″N 123°16′58″W	Corvallis	
47	Soap Creek School	Soap Creek School	June 19, 1991 (#91000803)	37465 Soap Creek Rd. 44°39′37″N 123°16′42″W	Corvallis vicinity	
48	Edwin and Anna Starr House	Edwin and Anna Starr House	October 9, 1986 (#86002840)	26845 McFarland Rd. 44°22′09″N 123°19′11″W	Monroe	
49	George Taylor House	George Taylor House	December 9, 1981 (#81000476)	504 NW 6th St. 44°34′10″N 123°15′39″W	Corvallis	AKA "Oliver House"
50	Jack Taylor House	Jack Taylor House	December 9, 1981 (#81000470)	806 SW 5th St. 44°33′28″N 123°16′01″W	Corvallis	
51	Watson–Price Farmstead	Watson–Price Farmstead	June 30, 2005 (#05000638)	23380 Hoskins Rd. 44°40′22″N 123°26′47″W	Kings Valley	Built 1848, one of ten entries on the Historic Preservation League of Oregon's Most Endangered Places in Oregon 2011 list.
52	Charles and Ibby Whiteside House	Charles and Ibby Whiteside House	August 2, 2007 (#07000774)	344 SW 7th St. 44°33′46″N 123°16′01″W	Corvallis	This excellent example of an airplane bungalow, built from planbooks in 1922 during a period of rapid growth in Corvallis, is probably the only house of that style ever constructed in the city.
53	Whiteside Theatre	Whiteside Theatre	February 25, 2009 (#09000060)	361 SW Madison Ave. 44°33′49″N 123°15′44″W	Corvallis	
54	Willamette Community and Grange Hall	Willamette Community and Grange Hall	May 28, 2009 (#09000359)	27555 Greenberry Road; 44°27′18″N 123°16′33″W	Corvallis vicinity	
55	Willamette Valley and Coast Railroad Depot – Corvallis	Willamette Valley and Coast Railroad Depot – Corvallis	February 21, 1997 (#97000137)	500 SW 7th St. 44°33′41″N 123°16′03″W	Corvallis	
56	James O. Wilson House	James O. Wilson House	November 6, 1980 (#80004546)	340 SW 5th St. 44°33′44″N 123°15′53″W	Corvallis	
57	Elias Woodward House	Elias Woodward House	August 11, 1983 (#83002143)	442 NW 4th St. 44°34′07″N 123°15′32″W	Corvallis	

== Former listings ==
	Name on the Register	Image	Date listed	Date removed	Location	City or town	Description
1	Ransom A. Belknap House		September 27, 1979 (#79002038)	May 14, 1982	W of Monroe	Monroe	Destroyed by fire on April 20, 1981.
2	Corvallis High School	Corvallis High School	August 15, 2003 (#03000692)	April 18, 2006	836 NW 11th St.	Corvallis	Demolished in August, 2005.
3	Old Kappa Alpha Theta Sorority House		May 19, 1989 (#89000516)	February 6, 1990	145 NW 21st St.	Corvallis	

== See also ==
- National Register of Historic Places listings in Oregon
- Listings in neighboring counties: Lane, Lincoln, Linn, Polk
- Historic preservation
- History of Oregon
- Lists of Oregon-related topics
