= Monroe State Bank Building =

- U.S. National Register of Historic Places
- The Monroe State Bank Building in 2026
- Location: 190 S. Fifth Street; Monroe, Oregon
- Coordinates: 44.315143°N 123.297414°W
- Area: 0.1 acres (0.040 ha)
- Built: 1911
- Architectural style: Early Commercial, Vernacular commercial
- NRHP reference No.: 92000065
- Added to NRHP: February 26, 1992

The Monroe State Bank Building, located in Monroe, Oregon, is a building listed on the National Register of Historic Places. When it opened in 1911 it was headquarters of the only bank established in southeast Benton County, Oregon.

It is a two-story building which "dominates" Monroe's business district from its corner of South Fifth and Commercial streets. The building is approximately 26 by 60 feet (7.9 m × 18.3 m) in plan.

This building has served as the telephone company and also as the home of the South Benton County Community Museum.

In 1992 the building was vacant and restoration was planned.

In 2021 this historic building has been transformed into a year round Christmas store, Christmas Junction

== See also ==
- National Register of Historic Places listings in Benton County, Oregon
