= First Congregational Church (Corvallis, Oregon) =

Historic church in Oregon, United States

- U.S. National Register of Historic Places
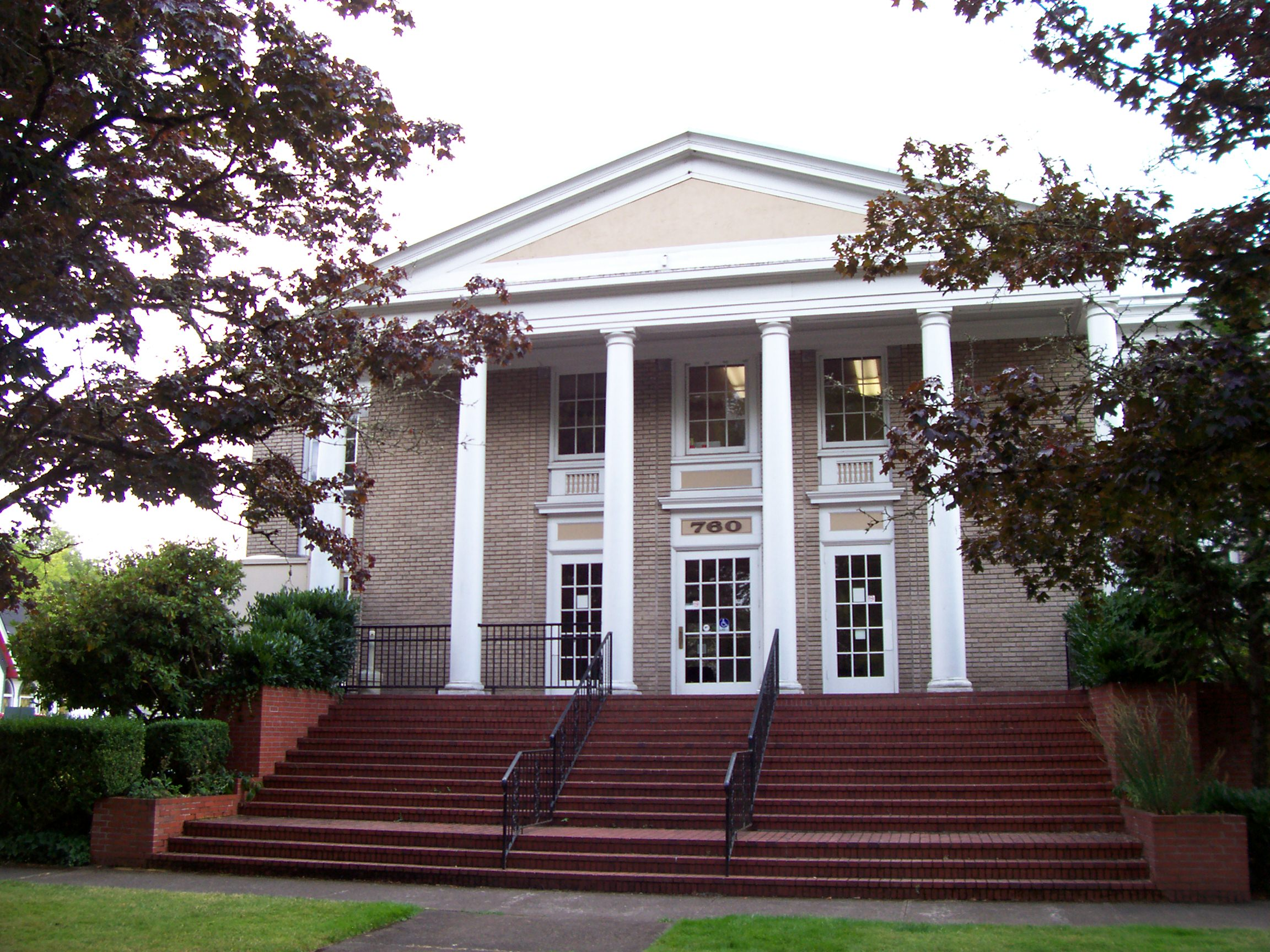
- The building's exterior in 2009

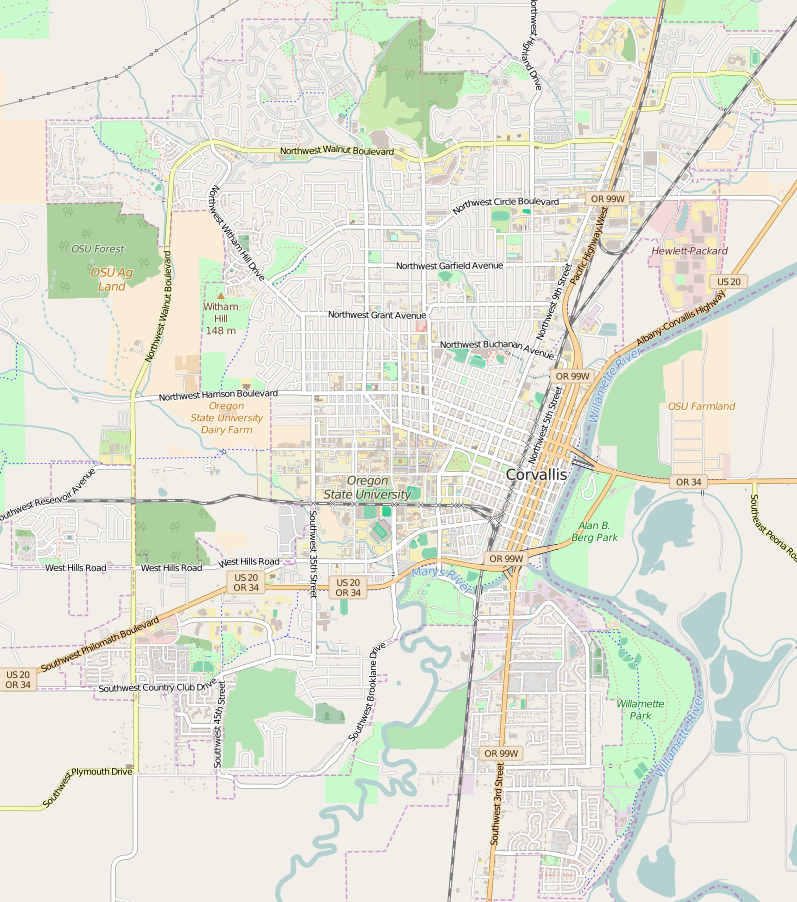
- Location within Corvallis OR Location within Oregon
- Location: 760 SW Madison Avenue; Corvallis, Oregon
- Coordinates: 44°33′53″N 123°15′55″W
- Area: Less than 1 acre (0.40 ha)
- Built: 1917
- Architect: Roy H. Dobell
- Architectural style: Georgian Revival
- NRHP reference No.: 81000473
- Added to NRHP: December 9, 1981

The First Congregational Church, also known as DeMoss–Durdan Mortuary, is a historic former church building in Corvallis, Oregon, United States. The church was listed on the National Register of Historic Places in 1981.

== History ==
The Congregationalists of Corvallis were formed as a splinter group from the First Presbyterian Church in 1883. Originally occupying a church building at 3rd Street & Jefferson, members of the church began to discuss their need for a new building as early as 1909. Under the direction of the new Reverend Edwin T. Sherman, a formal campaign was launched in 1912. In 1913, the church requested $10,000 from the Church Building Society and finally purchased the lot off of Madison St. & 8th in 1916. At a total cost of $15,000, construction was completed in 1917 and the church held its first service on April 5, 1918.

The First Congregational Church sponsored Boy Scout Troop One, the oldest troop in the Oregon Trails Council, who were organized at the church in October 1919, and continued to meet there until the change of ownership.

The building continued to be used by members of the Congregationalist church for 17 years, before being sold to J. B. Hollingsworth and his business partner Raymond A. DeMoss, Corvallis funeral home directors, in 1935. They renamed the building DeMoss–Durdan Mortuary, and operated the building as a mortuary until Mr. DeMoss's death in 1978.

As of 2025, the building houses Christ Central Anglican Church.

== See also ==
- National Register of Historic Places listings in Benton County, Oregon
