= Dr. George R. Farra House =

Historic House in Corvallis, Oregon

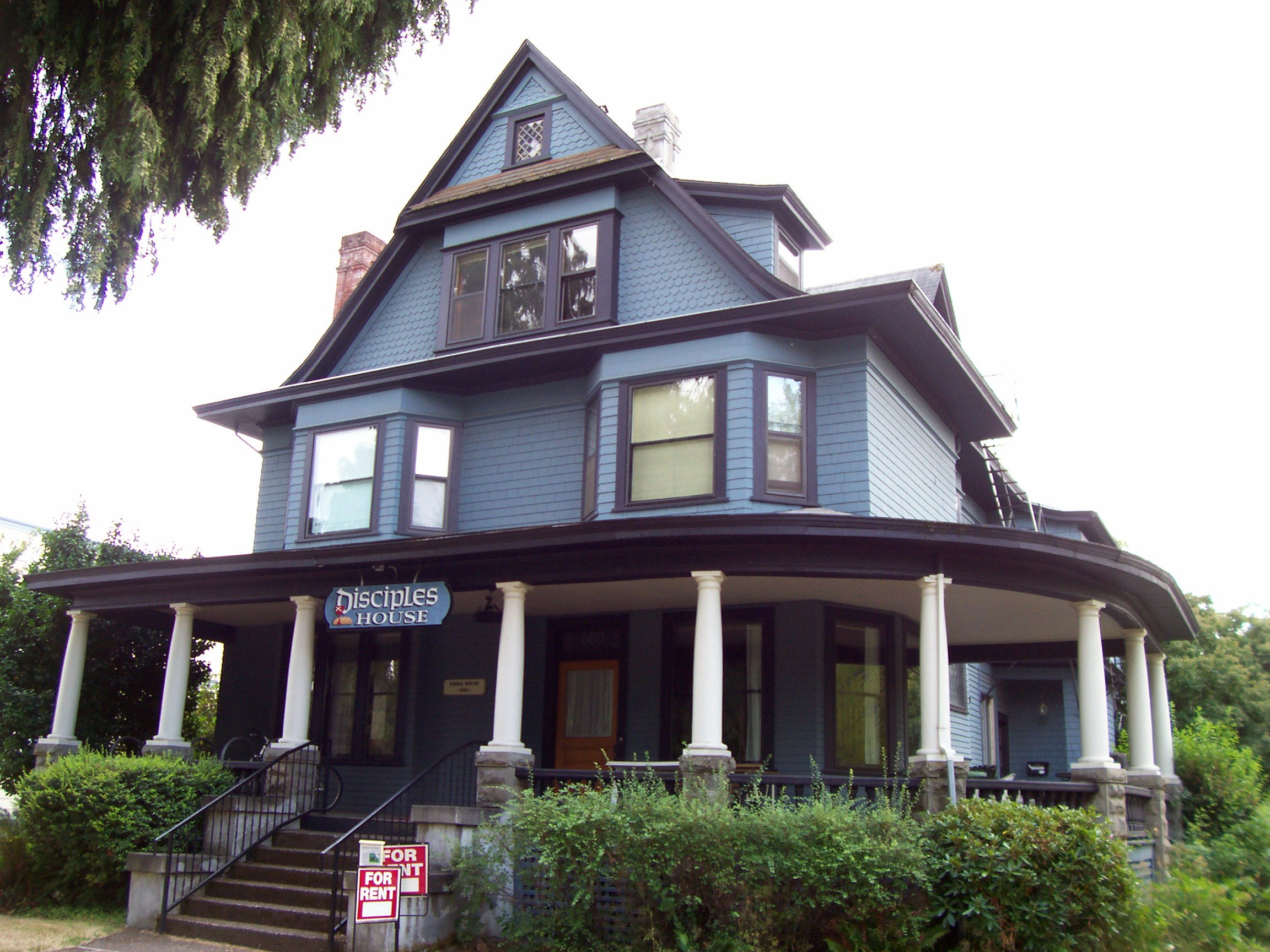
- The Dr. George R. Farra House
- Interactive map of Dr. George R. Farra House
- 44.5642°N 123.2655°W
- Location: 660 SW Madison Avenue, Corvallis, Oregon, United States

History
- Built: 1903
- Built for: Dr. George R. Farra

Site notes
- Architect: unknown
- Architectural style: Queen Anne

- Dr. George R. Farra House
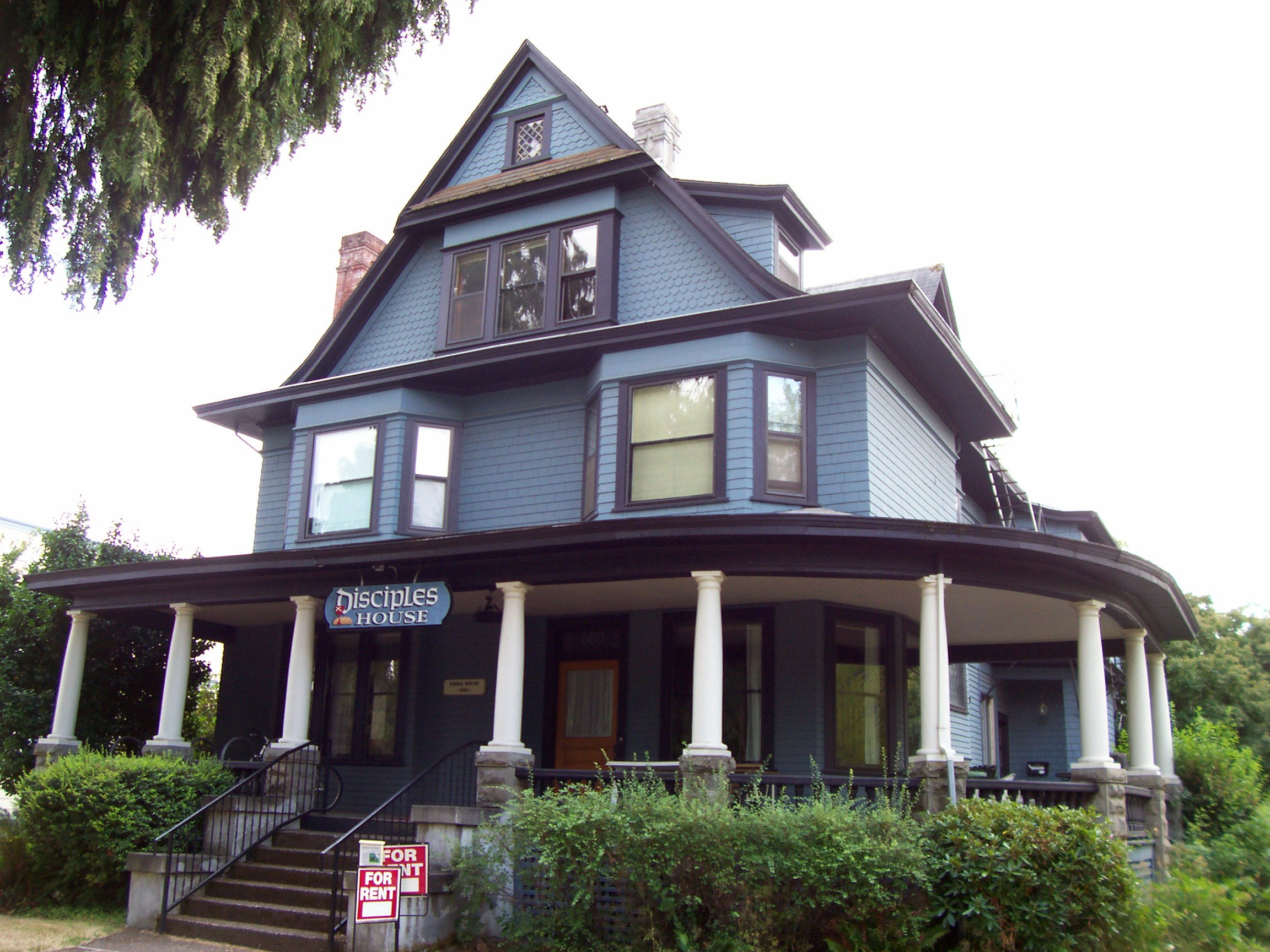
- The Dr. George R. Farra House
- Location: 660 SW Madison Avenue
- Coordinates: 44.5642°N 123.2655°W
- Built: 1903
- Architect: unknown
- Architectural style: Queen Anne
- Added to NRHP: Dec 9, 1981

The Dr. George R. Farra House is a historic house in Corvallis, Oregon, United States located at 660 SW Madison Avenue. It was built in 1903 in the Queen Anne style for Dr. George R. Farra, a local politician, pharmacist and businessman.

It was listed on the National Register of Historic Places in 1981.

== See also ==
- National Register of Historic Places listings in Benton County, Oregon
