= Isaac King House and Barn =

Historic house in Oregon, United States

- U.S. National Register of Historic Places
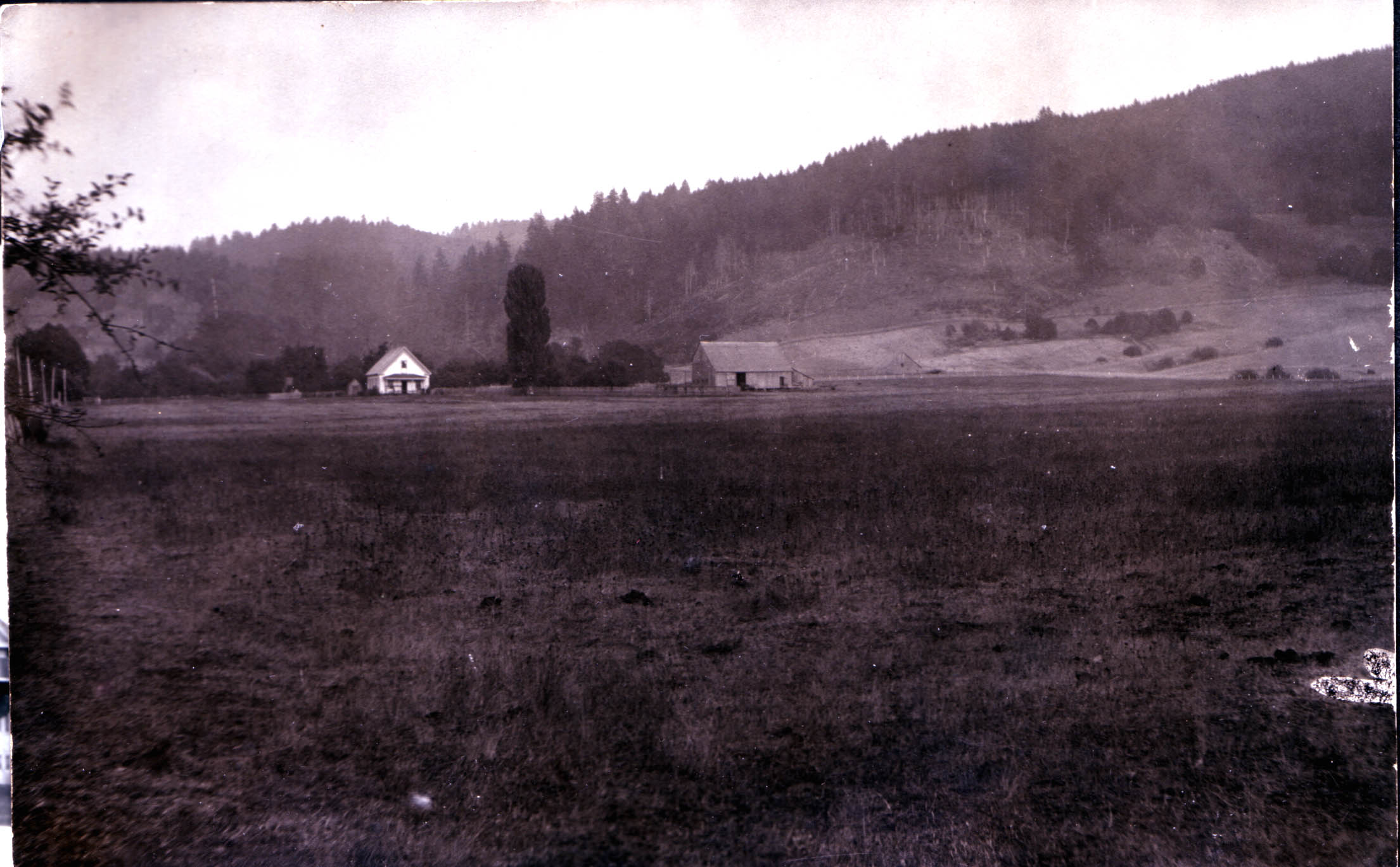
- The house and barn in 1938

- Location within Oregon Location within the United States
- Nearest city: Philomath, Oregon
- Coordinates: 44°40′10″N 123°25′37″W
- Area: 5.1 acres (2.1 ha)
- Built: c. 1855
- Built by: Pitman, William M.
- Architect: Pitman, William M.
- NRHP reference No.: 75001579
- Added to NRHP: October 29, 1975

The Isaac King House and Barn, located near Philomath, Oregon, is listed on the National Register of Historic Places. The house was designed and built by William Pitman in c.1855. It is about 25 by 45 feet (7.6 m × 13.7 m) in plan. It has a steep, gabled roof with a boxed cornice and returns.

The barn was built in the late 1840s and is one of the oldest surviving barns in Oregon. It has a hand-hewn frame and is "a rare, side drive thru, single lean-to type".

It was listed on the National Register in 1975 and received additional review in 1985.

== See also ==
- National Register of Historic Places listings in Benton County, Oregon
