= Charles King House =

Historic house in Oregon, United States

- U.S. National Register of Historic Places
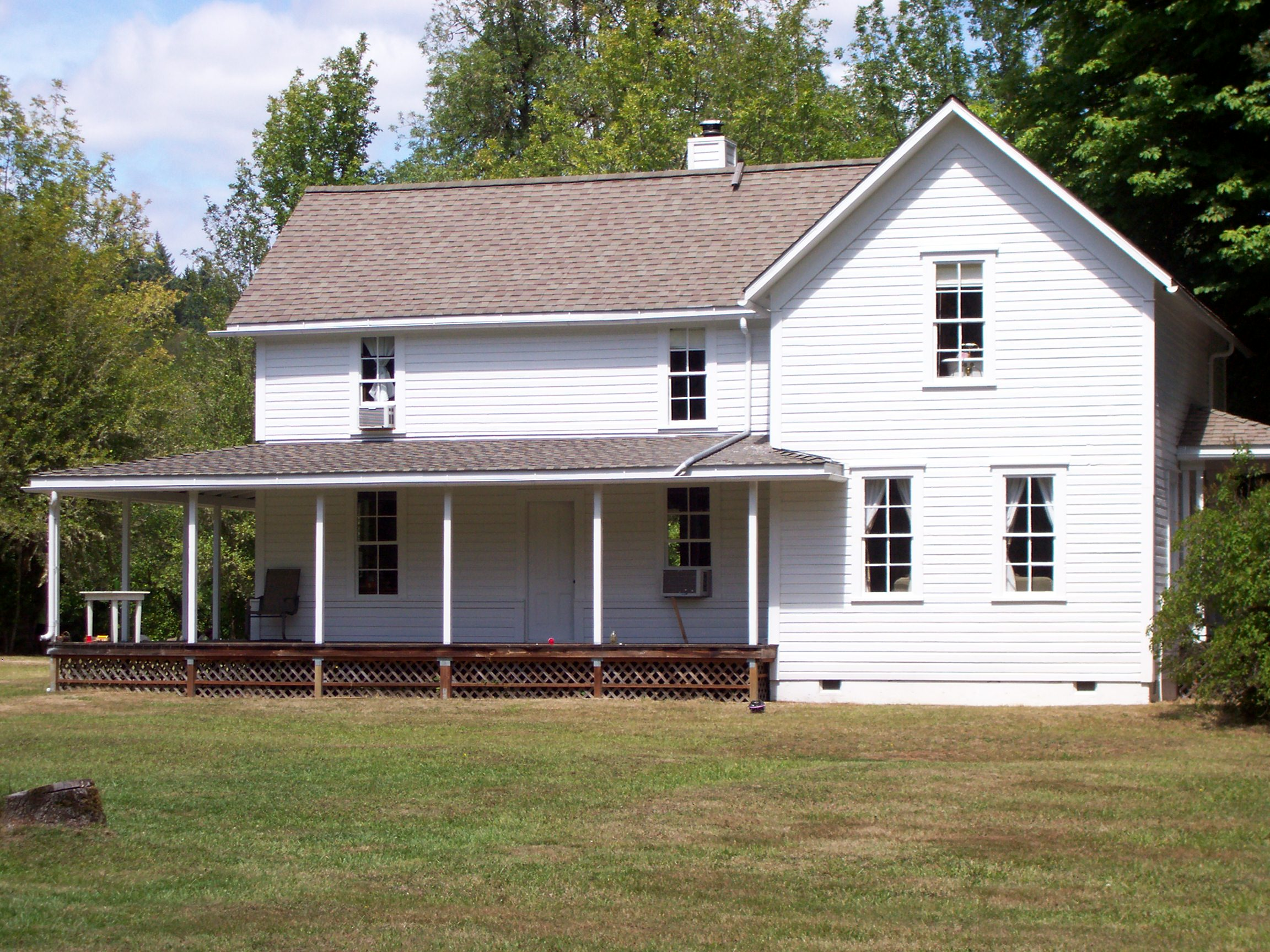
- The King House in 2009
- Location: 22930 Harris Road; Philomath, Oregon
- Coordinates: 44°34′47″N 123°27′38″W
- Area: 2 acres (0.81 ha)
- Built: ca. 1870
- Architectural style: Gothic Revival
- NRHP reference No.: 90000833
- Added to NRHP: June 1, 1990

The Charles King House is a historic residence near Philomath, Oregon, United States.

The house was listed on the National Register of Historic Places in 1990.

== See also ==
- National Register of Historic Places listings in Benton County, Oregon
