= George W. Bethers House =

Historic house in Oregon, United States

- U.S. National Register of Historic Places
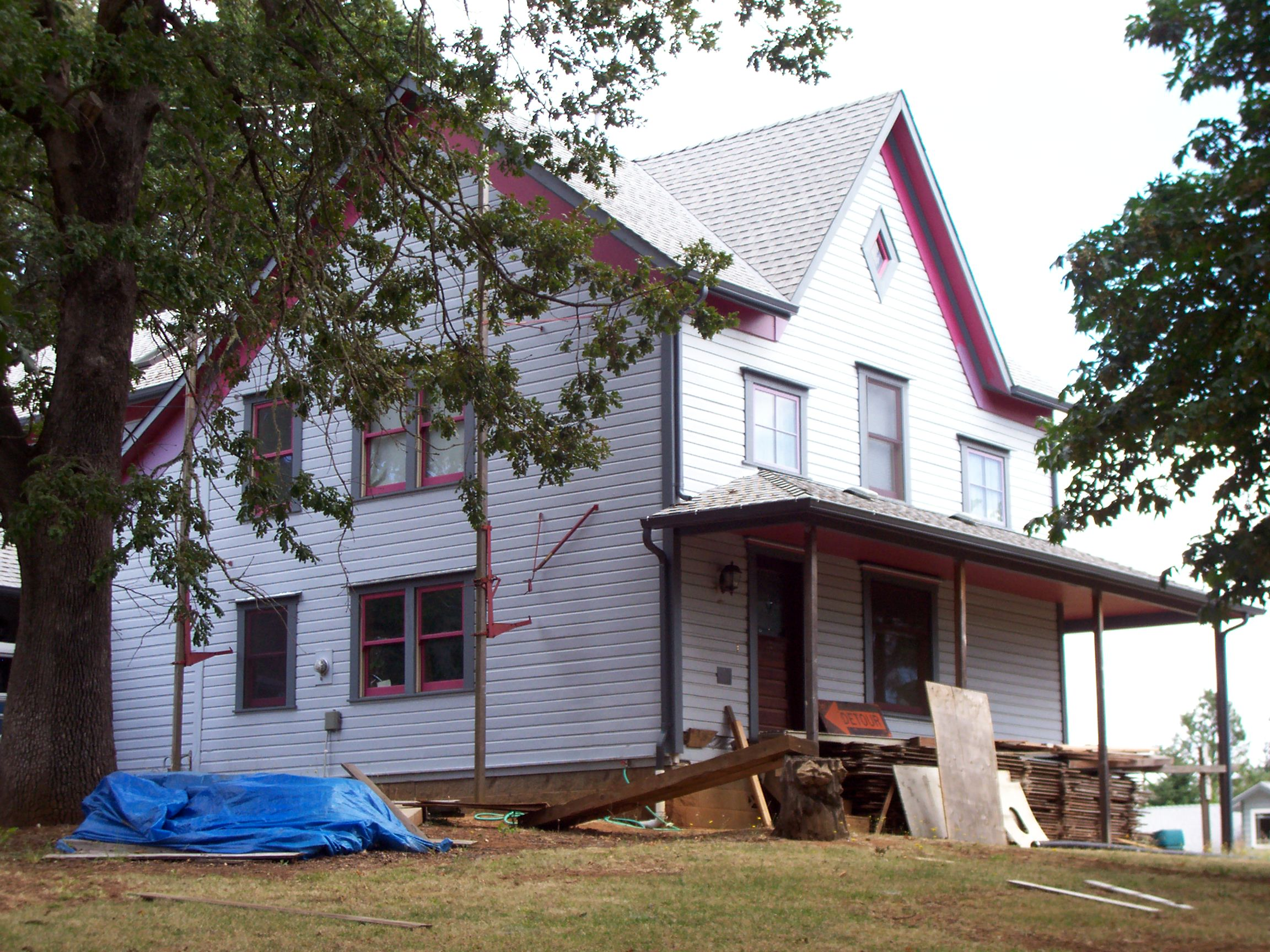
- The house's exterior in 2009
- Location: 225 N. 8th Street; Philomath, Oregon
- Coordinates: 44°32′30″N 123°22′30″W
- Area: 0.52 acres (0.21 ha)
- Built: c. 1873, remodeled ca. 1900
- Architectural style: Vernacular Rural Gothic
- NRHP reference No.: 97000590
- Added to NRHP: August 12, 1997

The George W. Bethers House, also known as the William Wyatt House, is a historic residence in Philomath, Oregon, United States. It was listed on the National Register of Historic Places in 1997.

The house was built c. 1873 and photos from 1900 show its Gothic Revival style. In 1997 it was being renovated to restore its Gothic Revival appearance. It is a two-story house with a cross-gable roof.

== See also ==
- National Register of Historic Places listings in Benton County, Oregon
