= Corvallis Hotel =

- U.S. National Register of Historic Places
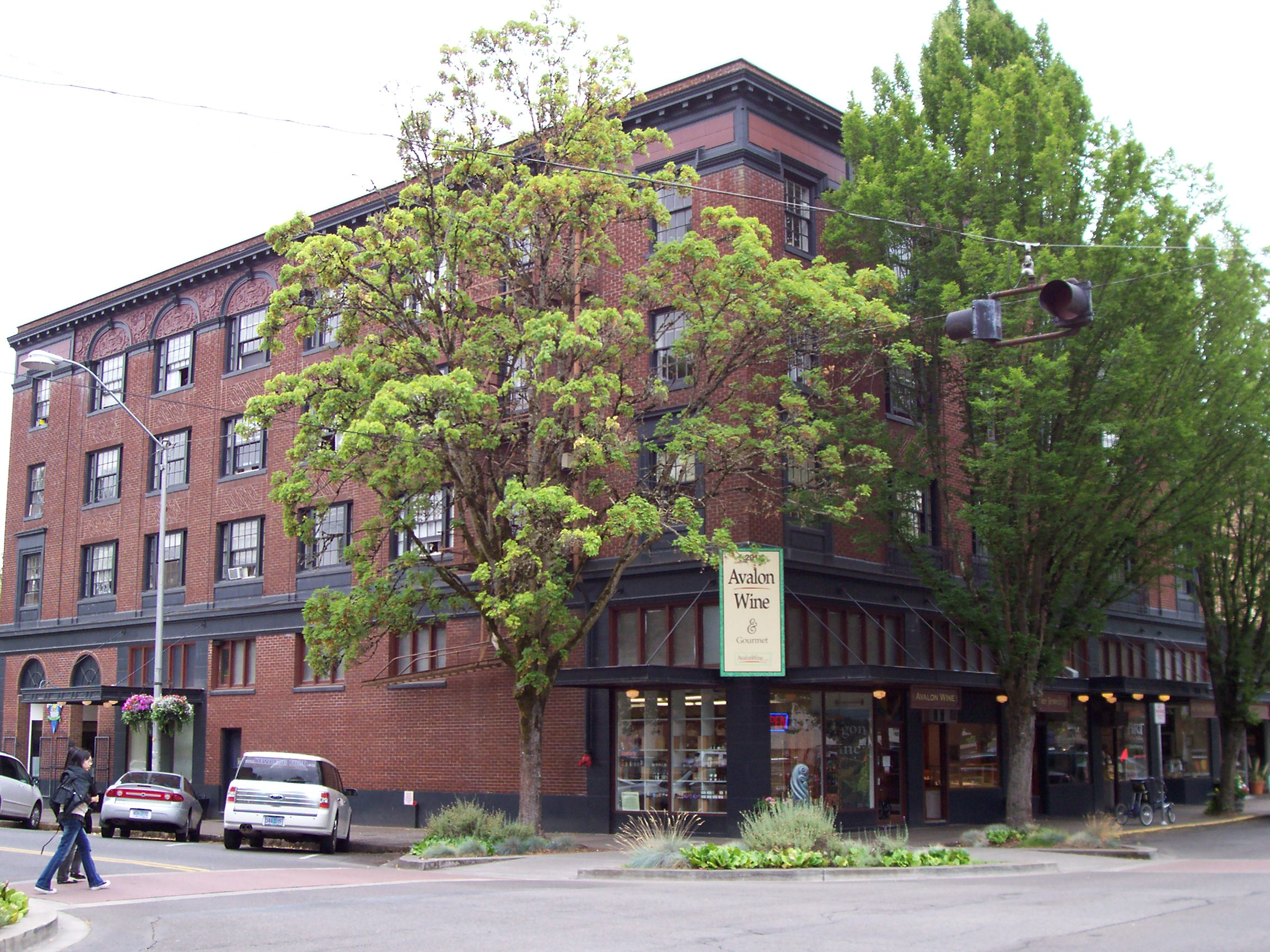
- Corvallis Hotel in 2009

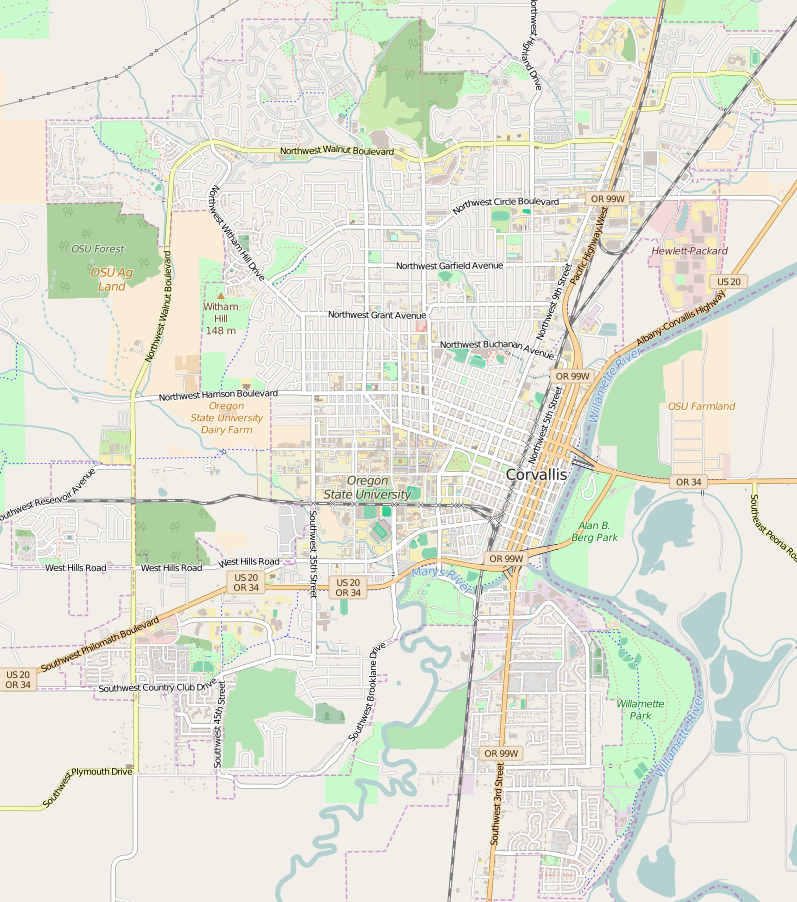
- Location within Corvallis OR Location within Oregon
- Location: 201--211 S.W. Second St., Corvallis, Oregon
- Coordinates: 44°33′47″N 123°15′32″W
- Area: less than one acre
- Built: 1927
- Architect: White, F. Manson; Heckart & Son
- Architectural style: Georgian
- NRHP reference No.: 87001533
- Added to NRHP: September 10, 1987

The Corvallis Hotel, located in Corvallis, Oregon, is listed on the National Register of Historic Places.

== See also ==
- National Register of Historic Places listings in Benton County, Oregon
