= Lewis G. Kline House =

Historic house in Oregon, United States

- U.S. National Register of Historic Places
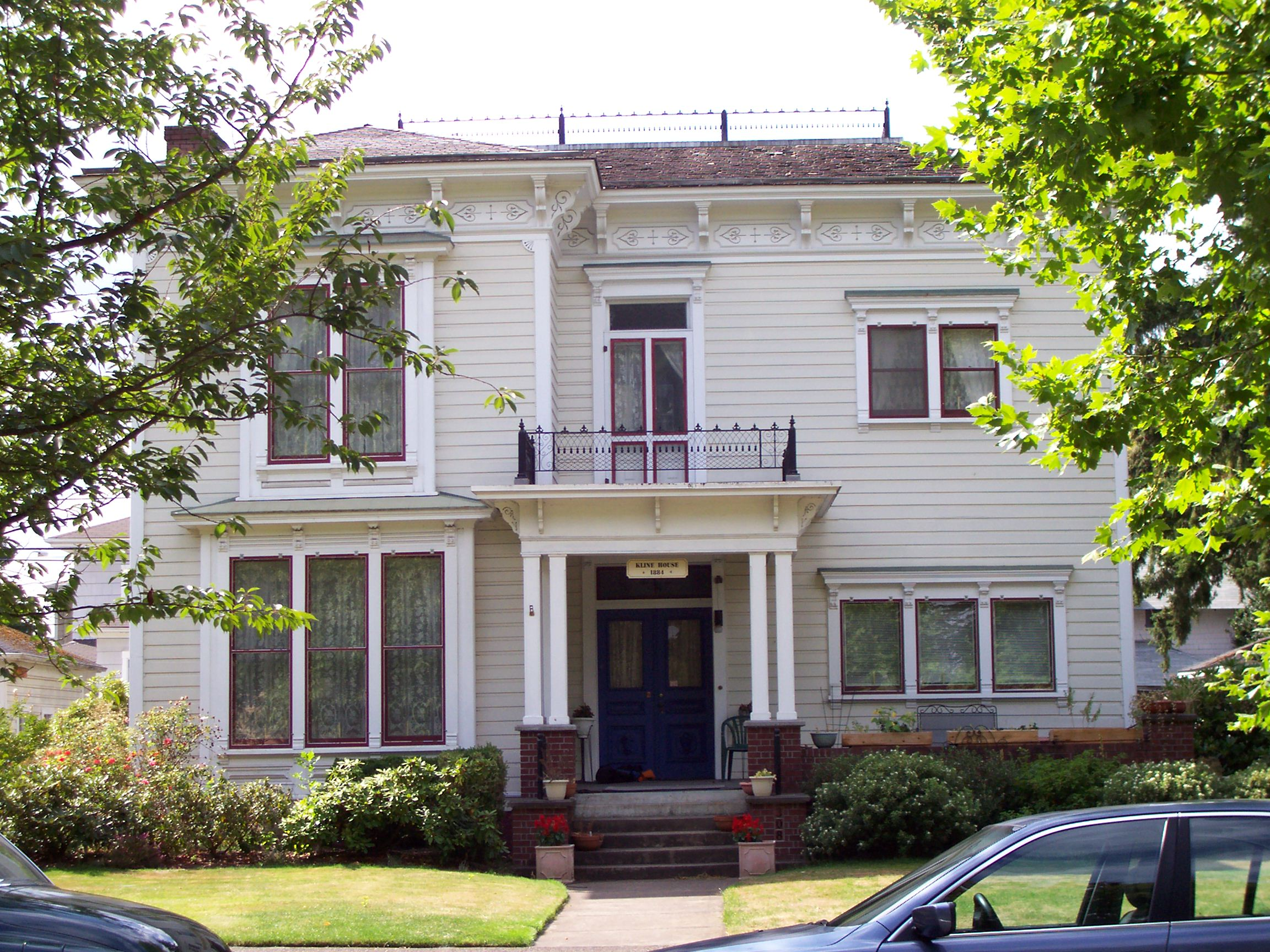
- Lewis G. Kline House c. 2009

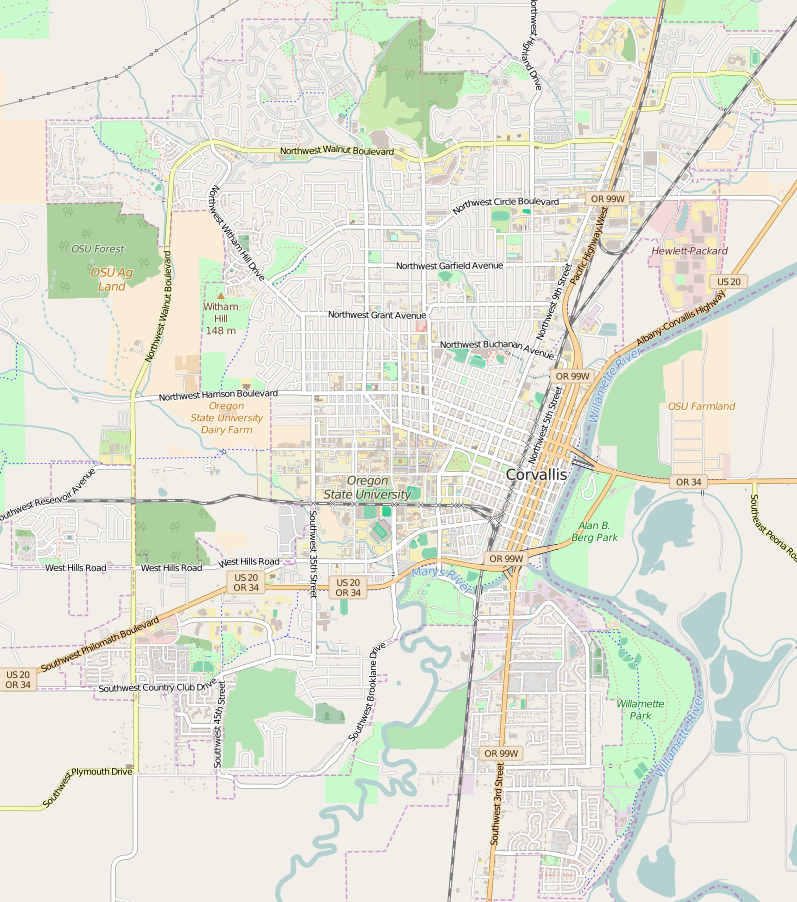
- Location within Corvallis OR Location within Oregon
- Location: 308 NW 8th St., Corvallis, Oregon
- Coordinates: 44°34′5″N 123°15′51″W
- Area: less than 1 acre (0.40 ha)
- Built: 1884
- Architectural style: Italianate, Italian Bracketed
- NRHP reference No.: 81000475
- Added to NRHP: 9 December 1981

The Lewis G. Kline House is a historic house located at 308 Nw 8th Street in Corvallis, Oregon.

== Description and history ==
The house was built for local mercantilist Lewis Kline in 1884 and reflects Italianate architecture.

The wood frame two story house sits on a brick foundation and basement and has an irregular floor plan of 3,118 square feet (289.7 m^{2}). The hipped roof and boxed cornice are supported with console brackets that feature scroll saw ornamentation of stylized foliate motifs. The double hung sash 1 over 1 windows are grouped in twos with tripartite arrangements some in bays with varied projection. Fenestrations are topped with bracketed hood lintels and retain the original shutters.

Siting on the northwest corner of NW 8th Street and Van Buren in a residential neighborhood, the facade faces east toward 8th Street. A front porch has seen non historic modifications and roof ridge cresting is no longer present. The front door and interior doors have top lights and interior wood trim remains intact. First floor rooms include a large parlor, a solarium and a library as well as a dining room and kitchen. Interior walls are lathe and plaster and floors are tongue and groove fir. Two stairways lead to the three bedrooms, two bathrooms and sitting room with marble fireplace upstairs. Bathrooms are of an unknown date but were present in 1954.

The Lewis G. Kline House was listed on the National Register of Historic Places on December 9, 1981.

== See also ==
- Historic preservation
- National Register of Historic Places listings in Benton County, Oregon
