= Charles Gaylord House =

Historic house in Oregon, United States

- U.S. National Register of Historic Places
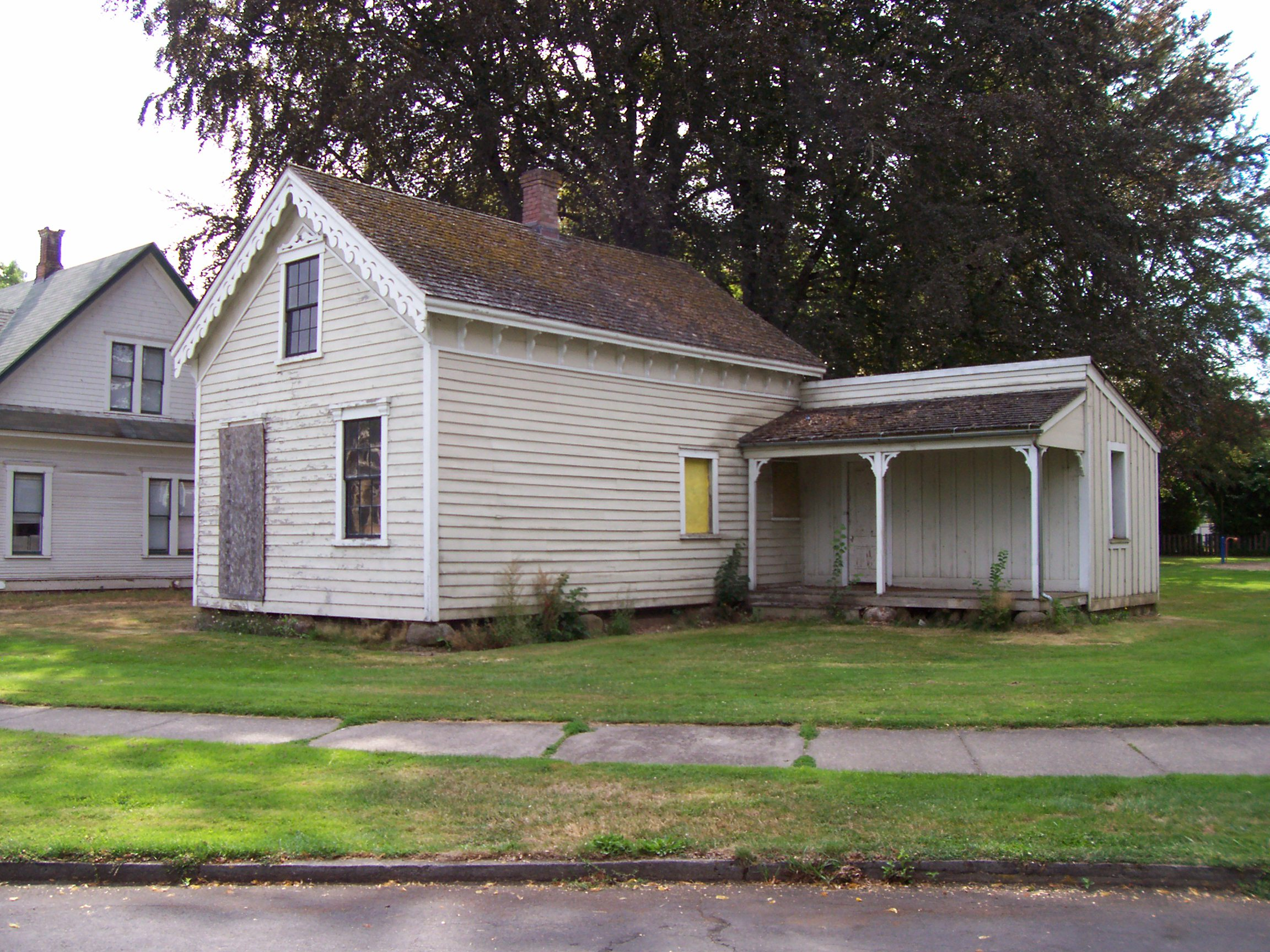
- The Gaylord House in 2009

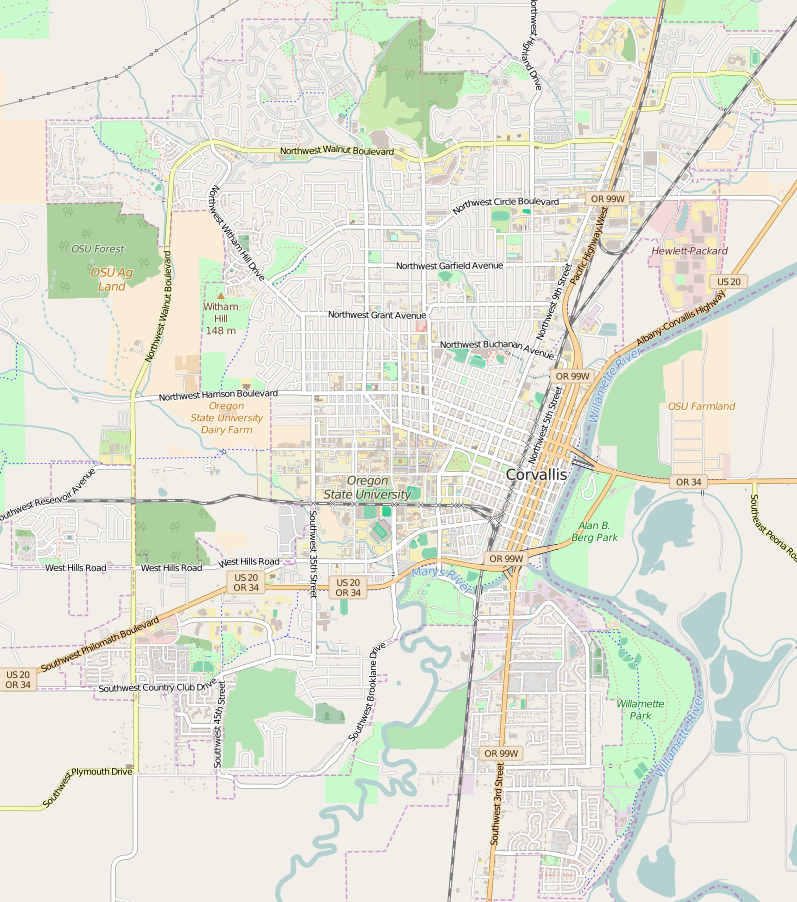
- Location within Corvallis OR Location within Oregon
- Location: 600 NW 7th Street; Corvallis, Oregon
- Coordinates: 44°34′14″N 123°15′47″W
- Area: 0.1 acres (0.040 ha)
- Built: 1857
- Architect: Gaylord, Charles
- Architectural style: Gothic Revival
- NRHP reference No.: 91000805
- Added to NRHP: June 21, 1991

The Charles Gaylord House, located in Corvallis, Oregon, is a house that is listed on the National Register of Historic Places.

== See also ==
- National Register of Historic Places listings in Benton County, Oregon
