= Jesse H. Caton House =

Historic house in Oregon, United States

- U.S. National Register of Historic Places
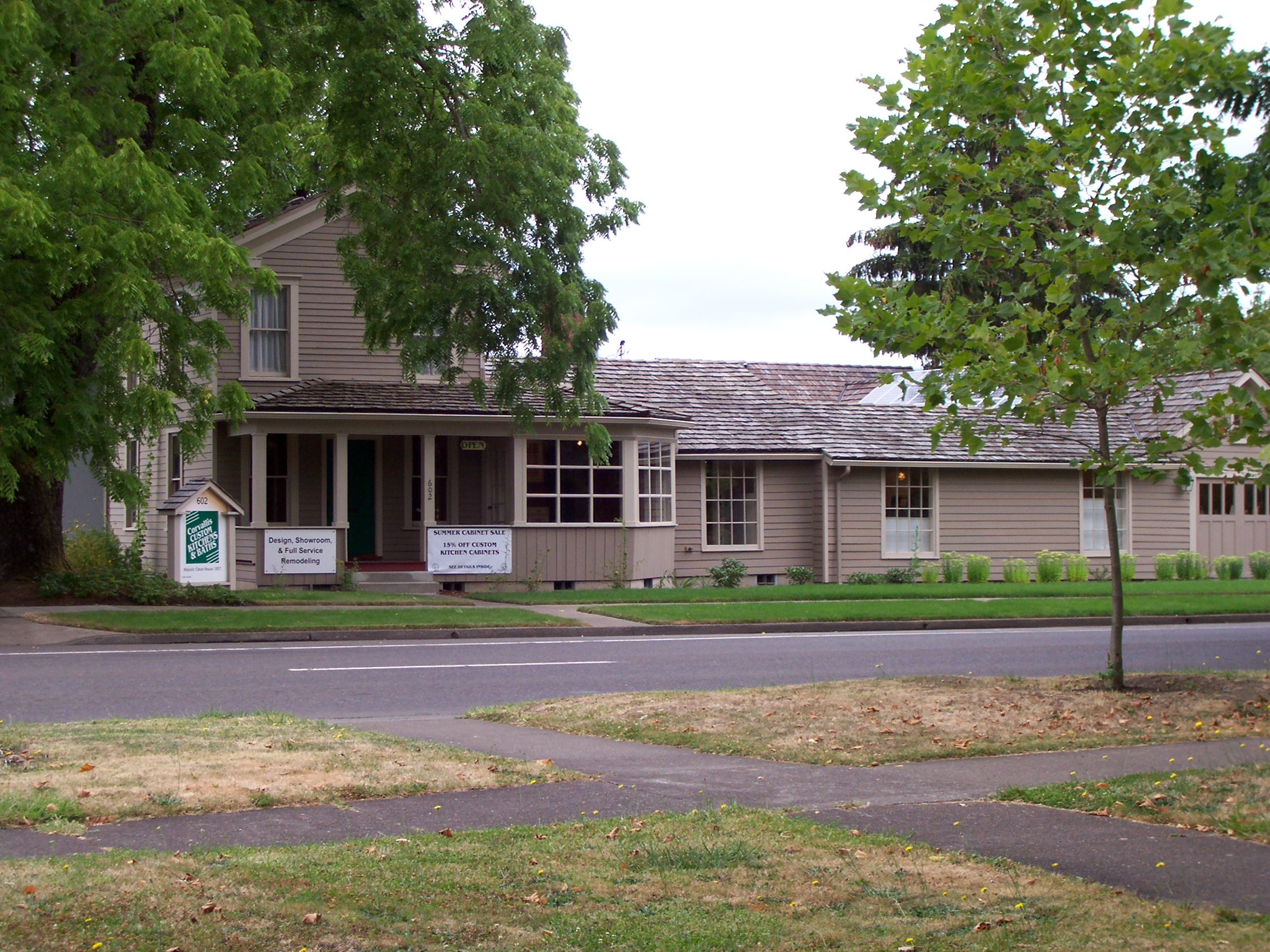
- Jesse H. Caton House

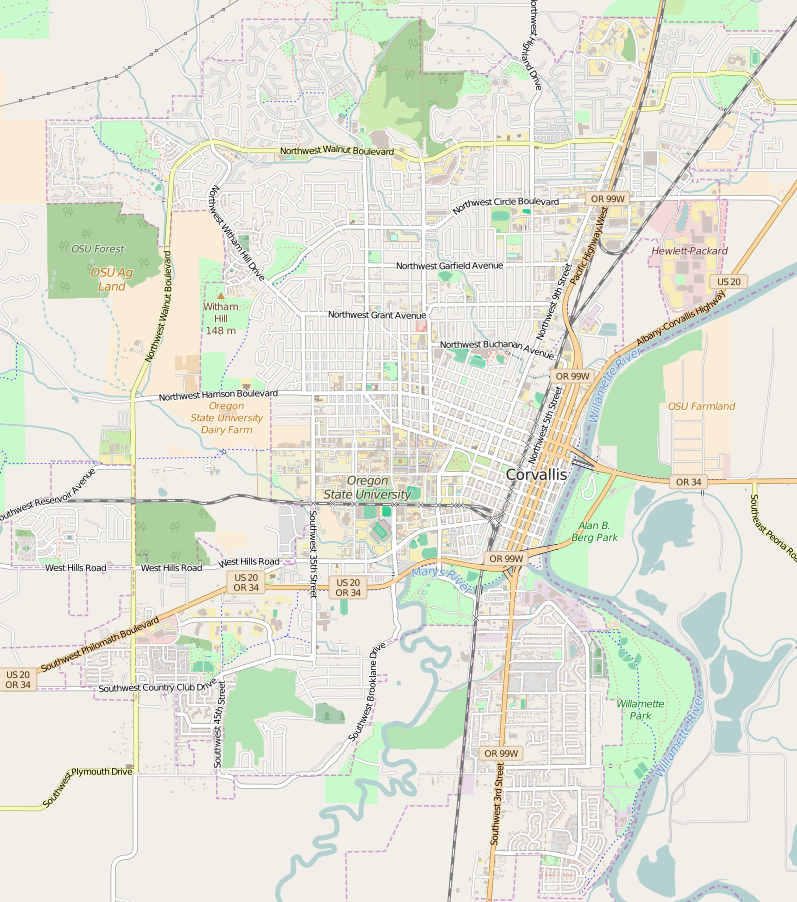
- Location within Corvallis OR Location within Oregon
- Location: 602 NW 4th St., Corvallis, Oregon
- Coordinates: 44°34′12″N 123°15′30″W
- Area: less than one acre
- Built: 1857
- Architect: Phillips, Levi C.
- Architectural style: Greek Revival
- NRHP reference No.: 79002037
- Added to NRHP: September 27, 1979

The Jesse H. Caton House, located in Corvallis, Oregon, is a house listed on the National Register of Historic Places.

== See also ==
- National Register of Historic Places listings in Benton County, Oregon
