= Benton County State Bank Building =

Building in Corvallis, Oregon

- U.S. National Register of Historic Places
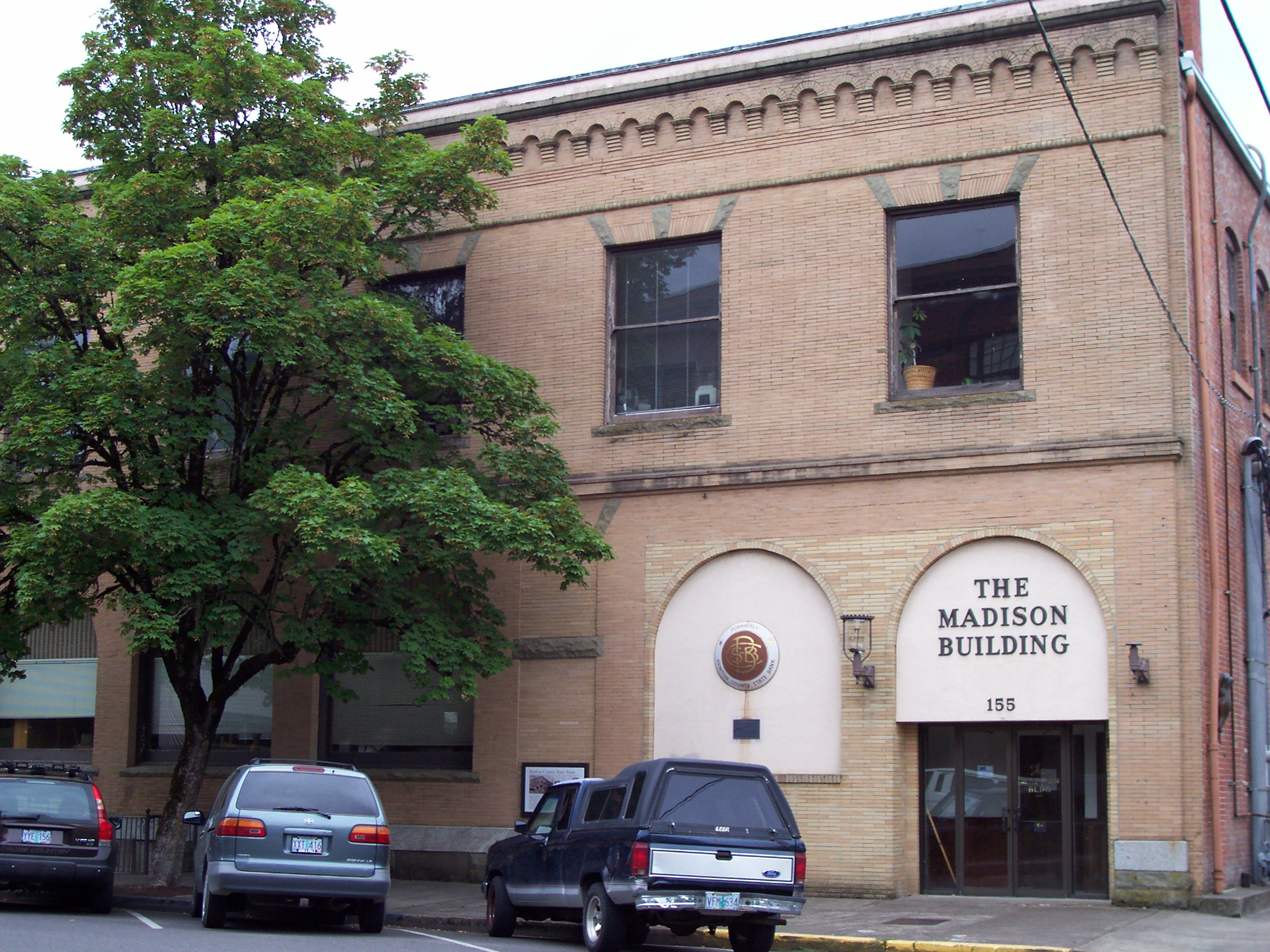
- Benton County State Bank Building

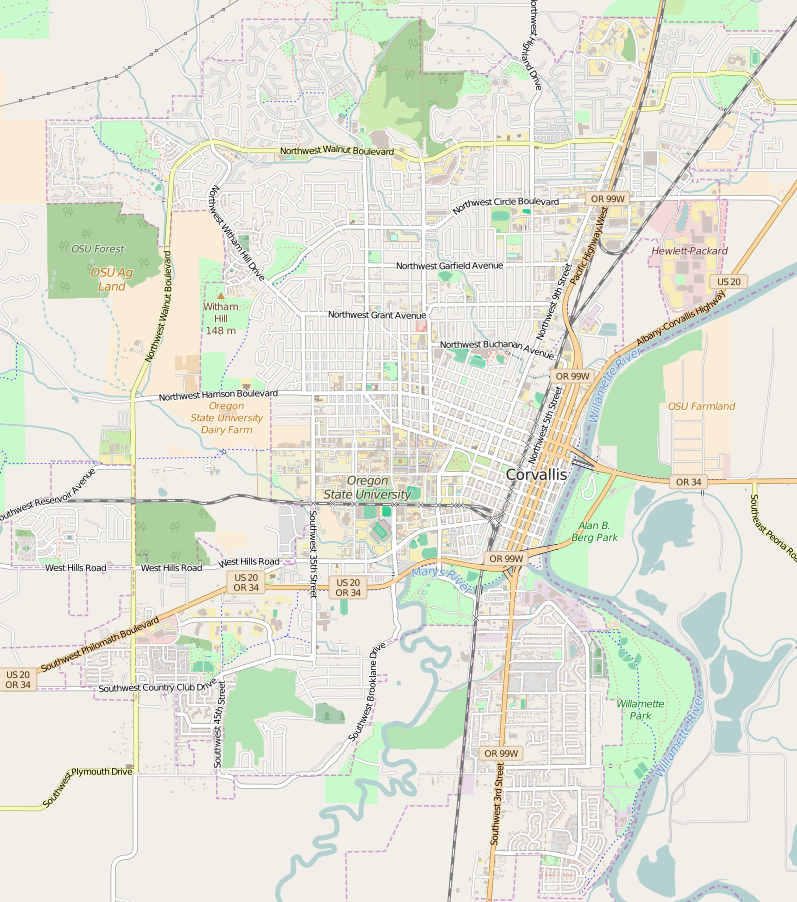
- Location within Corvallis OR Location within Oregon
- Location: 155 SW Madison Ave., Corvallis, Oregon
- Coordinates: 44°33′48″N 123°15′31″W
- Area: less than one acre
- Built: 1907
- NRHP reference No.: 79002035
- Added to NRHP: March 7, 1979

The Benton County State Bank Building, also known as The Madison Building, located in Corvallis, Oregon, is listed on the National Register of Historic Places.

It was built in 1907. It is a two-story brick building that is approximately 57.2 by 100.75 feet (17.43 m × 30.71 m) in plan.

== See also ==
- National Register of Historic Places listings in Benton County, Oregon
