= J. R. Bryson House =

Historic house in Oregon, United States

- U.S. National Register of Historic Places
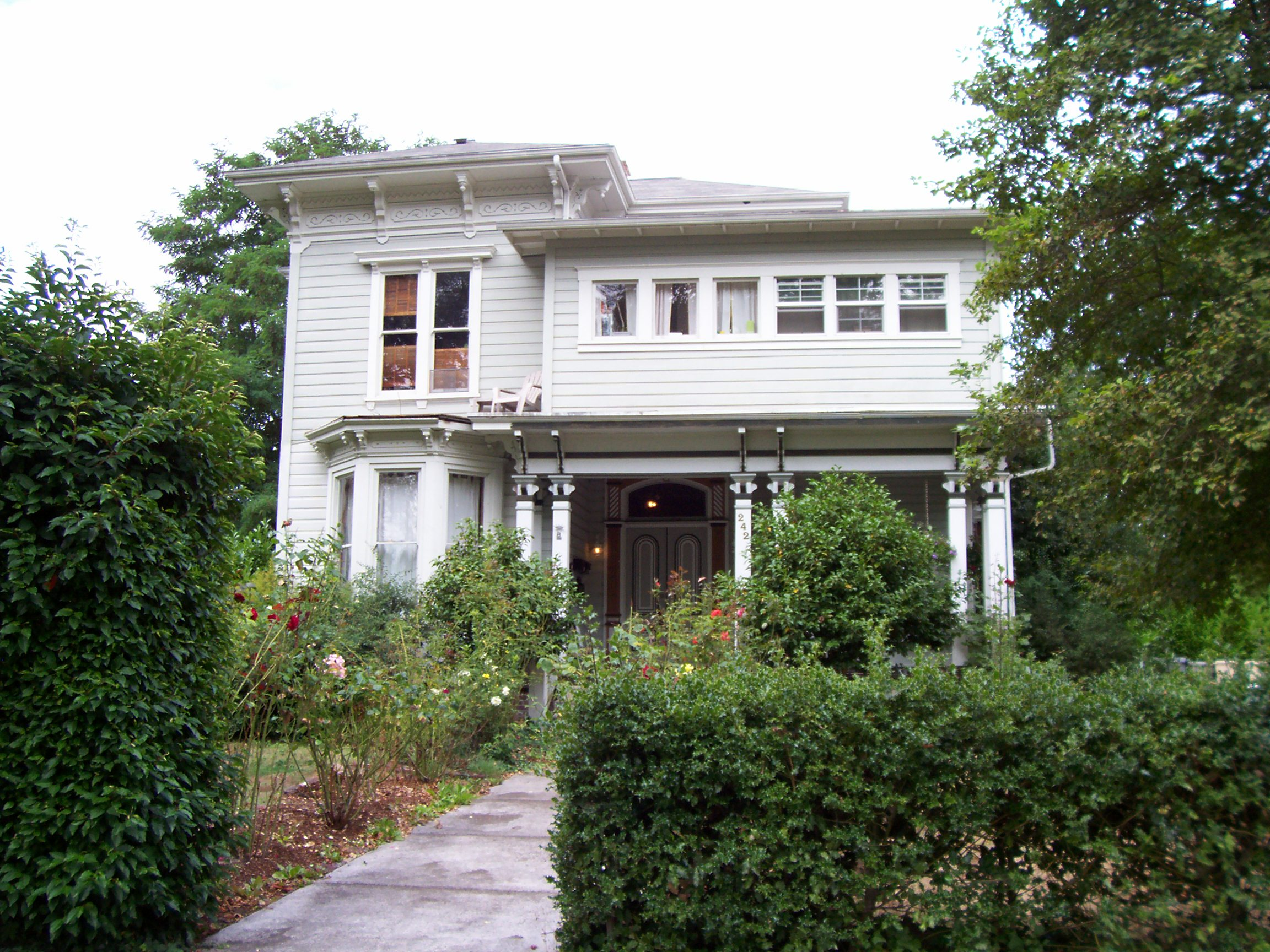
- The house's exterior in 2009

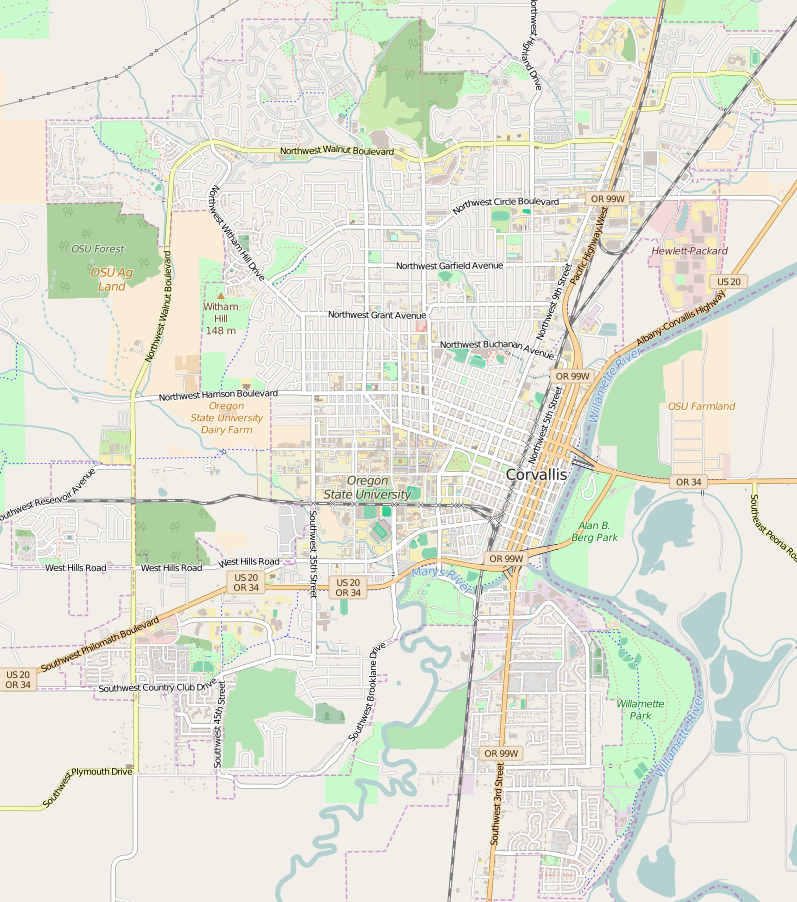
- Location within Corvallis OR Location within Oregon
- Location: 242 NW 7th St., Corvallis, Oregon
- Coordinates: 44°34′3″N 123°15′47″W
- Area: less than one acre
- Built: 1882
- Architect: Emerick, Joseph
- Architectural style: Italianate, Italian Bracketed
- NRHP reference No.: 79002036
- Added to NRHP: November 15, 1979

The J. R. Bryson House, located in Corvallis, Oregon, is a house that is listed on the National Register of Historic Places.

== See also ==
- National Register of Historic Places listings in Benton County, Oregon
