= Lewis G. Kline Building =

- Kline, Lewis G., Building
- U.S. National Register of Historic Places
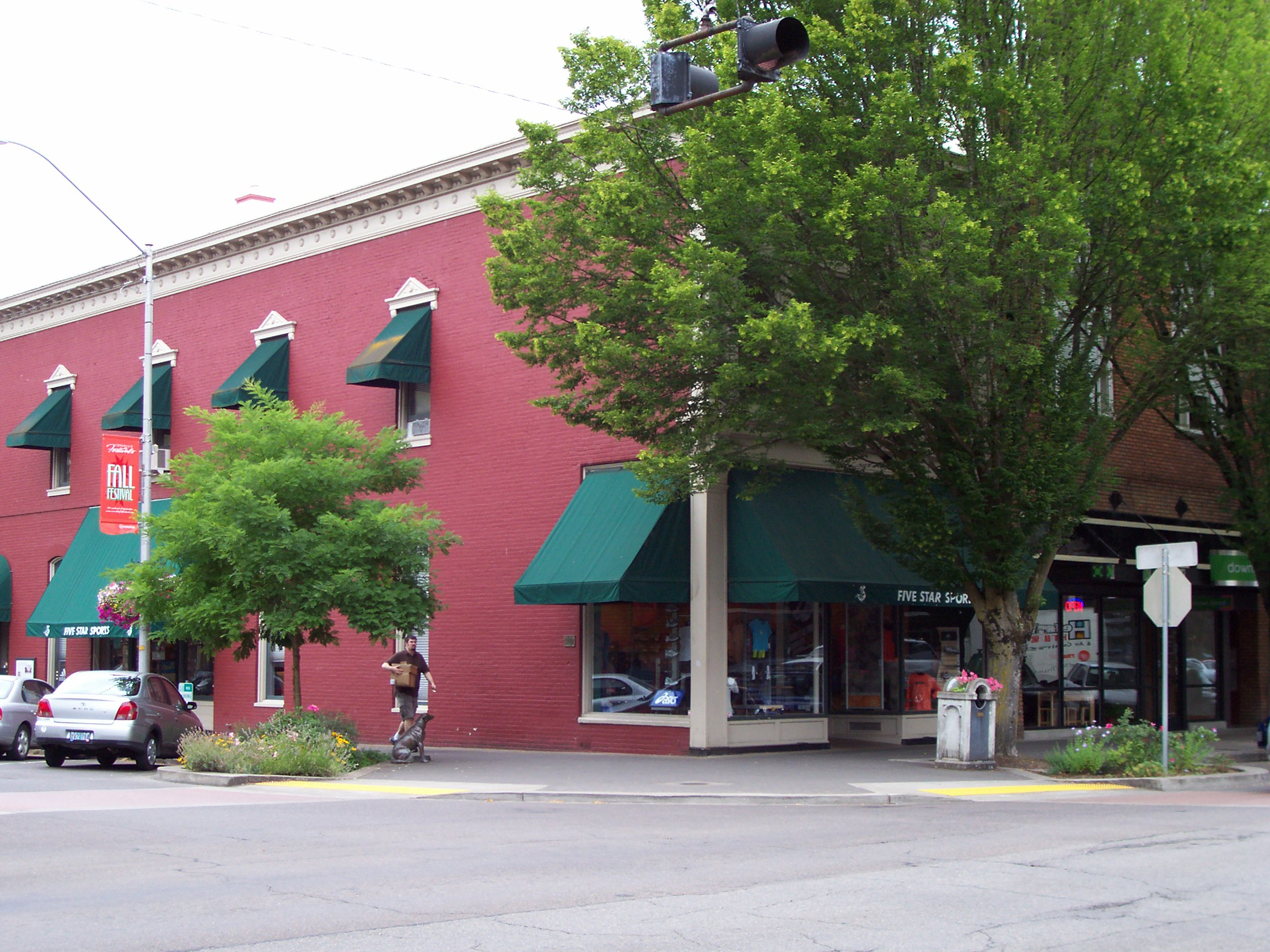
- Lewis G. Kline Building in 2009

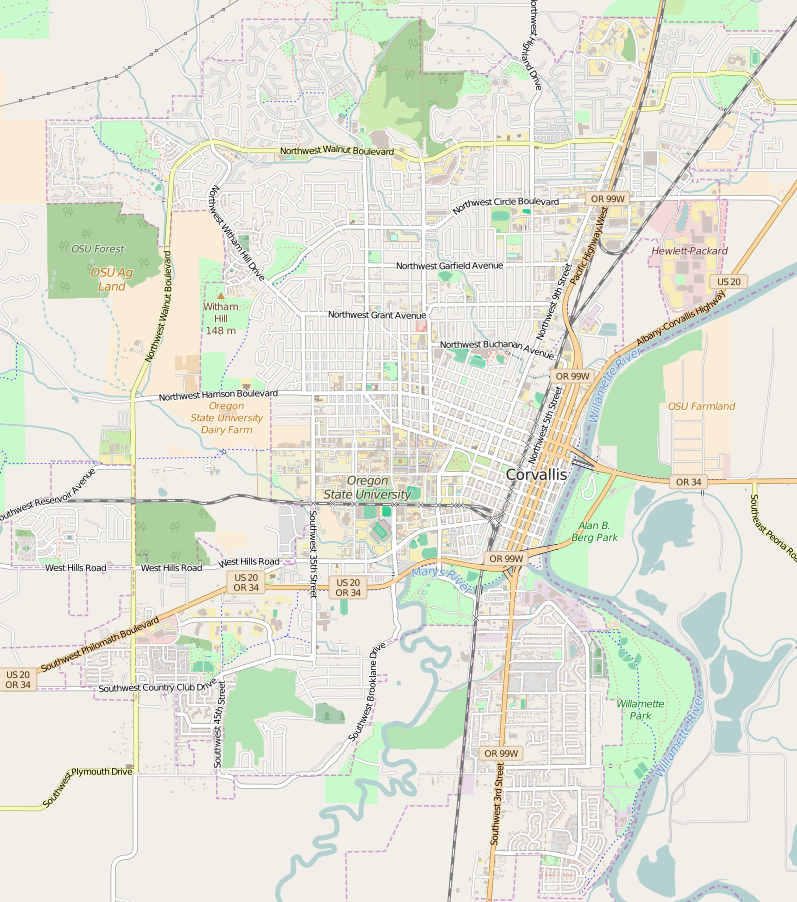
- Location within Corvallis OR Location within Oregon
- Location: 146 S.W. Second St., Corvallis, Oregon
- Coordinates: 44°33′48″N 123°15′33″W
- Area: less than one acre
- Built: 1889
- Architectural style: Italianate, High Victorian Italianate
- NRHP reference No.: 86000293
- Added to NRHP: February 27, 1986

The Lewis G. Kline Building, located in Corvallis, Oregon, is listed on the National Register of Historic Places.

== See also ==
- National Register of Historic Places listings in Benton County, Oregon
