= Camp Arboretum Sign Shop =

- U.S. National Register of Historic Places
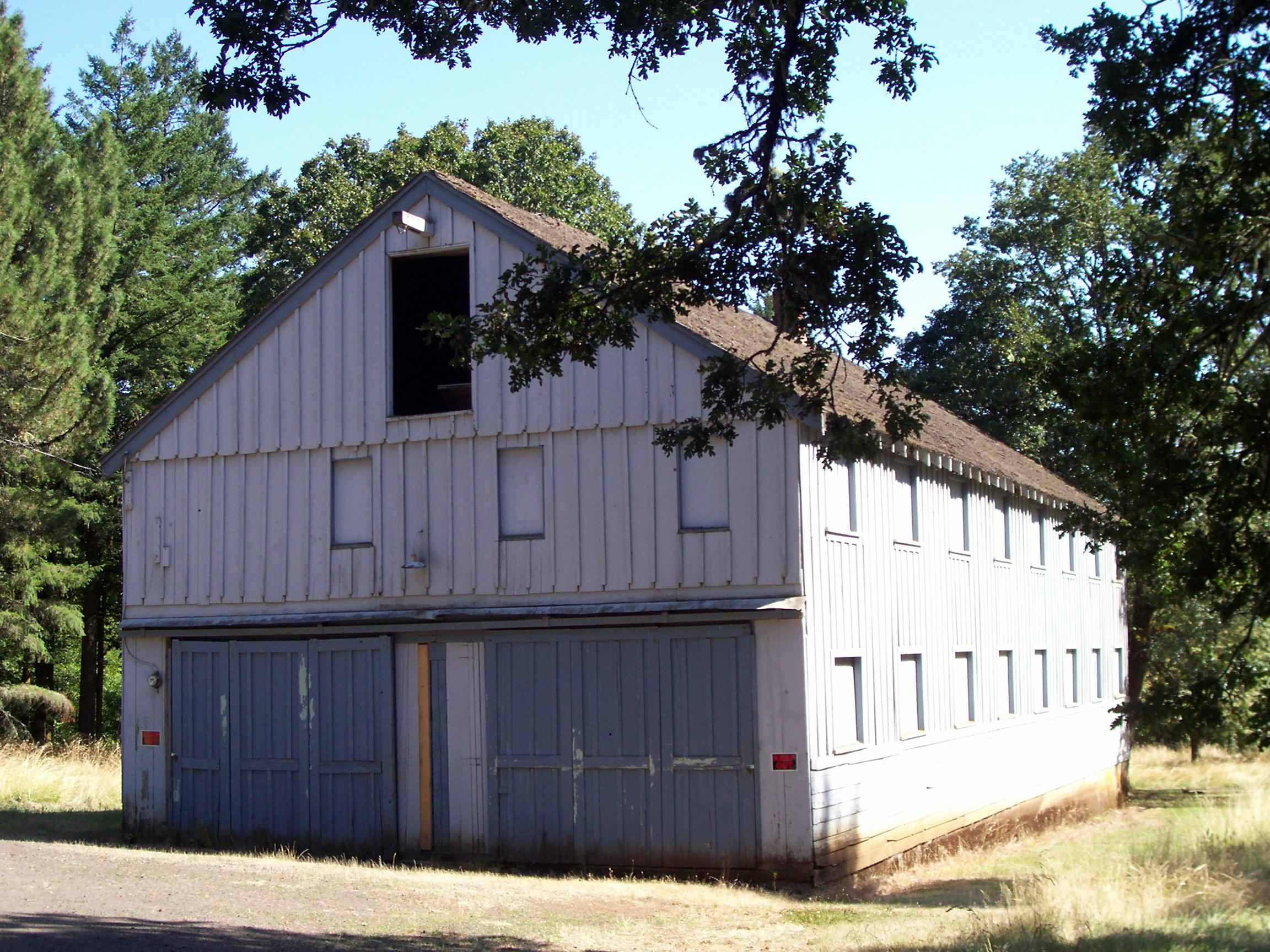
- Camp Arboretum Sign Shop

- Location within Oregon Location within the United States
- Nearest city: Corvallis, Oregon
- Coordinates: 44.65596°N 123.23284°W
- Area: less than one acre
- Built: 1936
- Architect: Civilian Conservation Corps
- Architectural style: Late 19th and 20th Century Revivals, Rustic
- NRHP reference No.: 08000544
- Added to NRHP: June 25, 2008

The Camp Arboretum Sign Shop, located in Corvallis, Oregon, is listed on the National Register of Historic Places.

== See also ==
- National Register of Historic Places listings in Benton County, Oregon
