= Soap Creek School =

- U.S. National Register of Historic Places
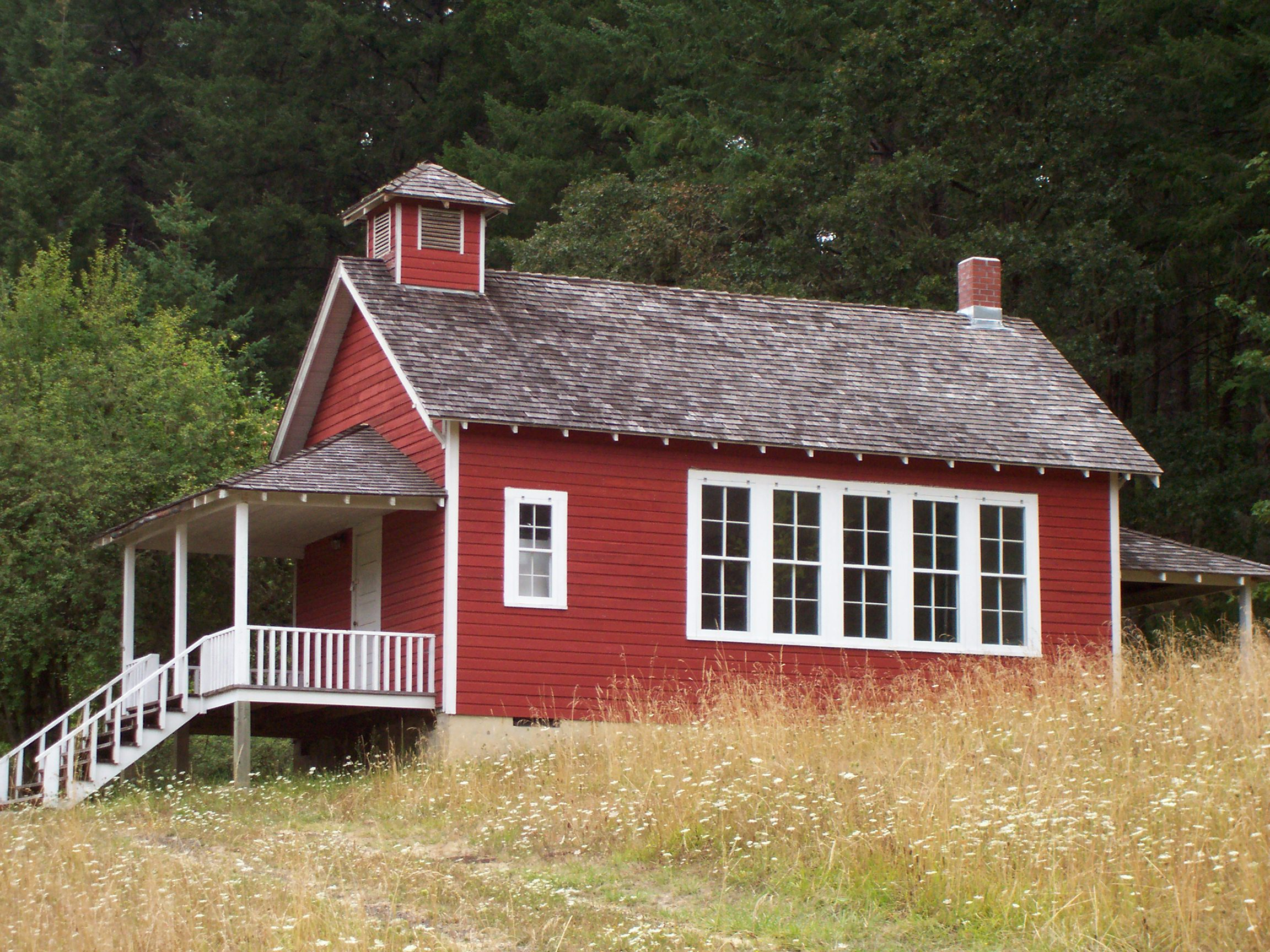
- Soap Creek School

- Location within Oregon Location within the United States
- Nearest city: Corvallis, Oregon
- Coordinates: 44°39′37″N 123°16′42″W
- Area: 1 acre (0.40 ha)
- Built: 1932
- Architect: Johansen, Pete
- Architectural style: Bungalow/Craftsman
- NRHP reference No.: 91000803
- Added to NRHP: June 19, 1991

The Soap Creek School, located near Corvallis, Oregon, United States, is listed on the National Register of Historic Places.

== See also ==
- National Register of Historic Places listings in Benton County, Oregon
