= Dr. Ralph Lyman Bosworth House =

Historic house in Oregon, United States

- U.S. National Register of Historic Places
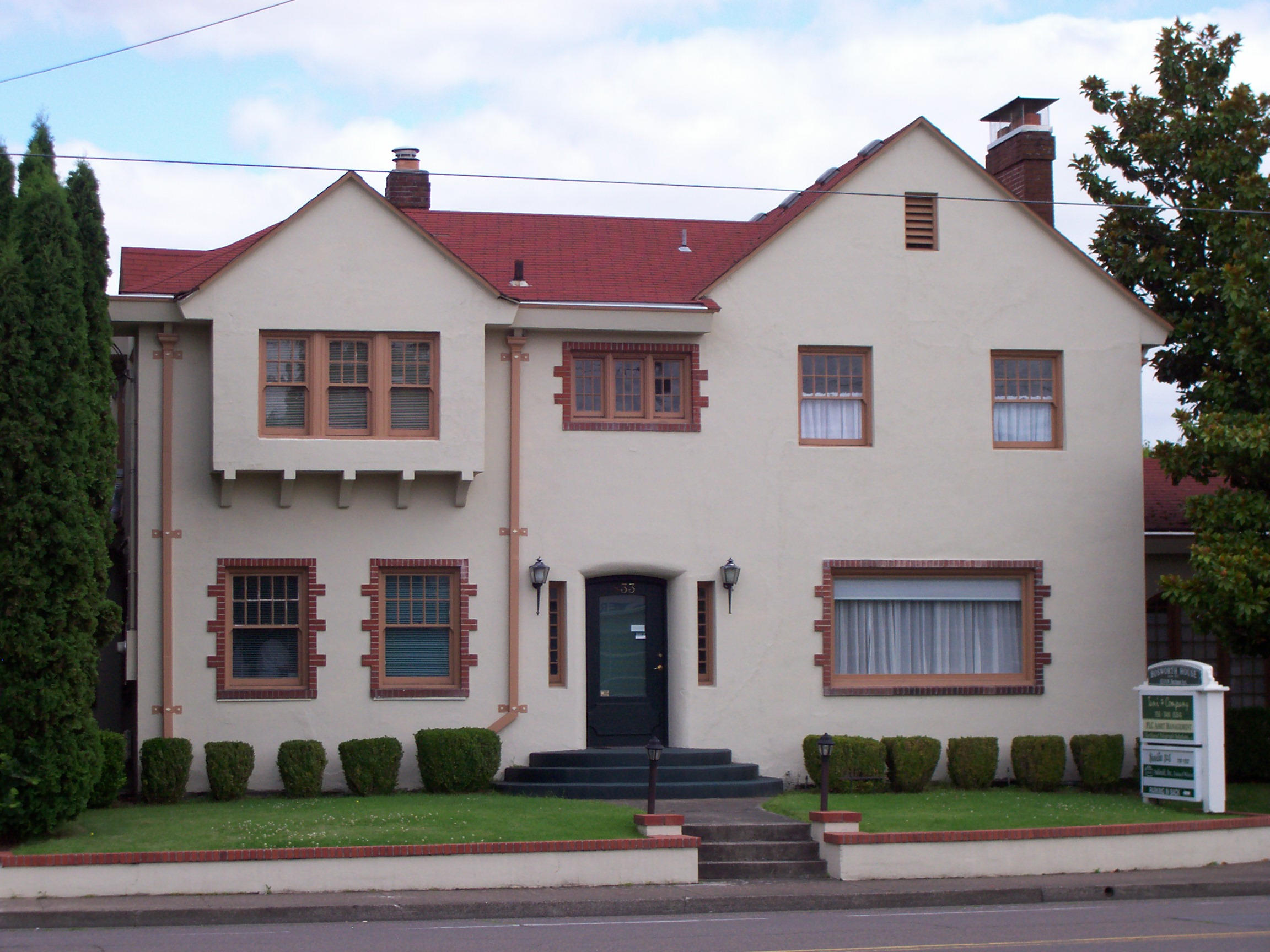
- Dr. Ralph Lyman Bosworth House

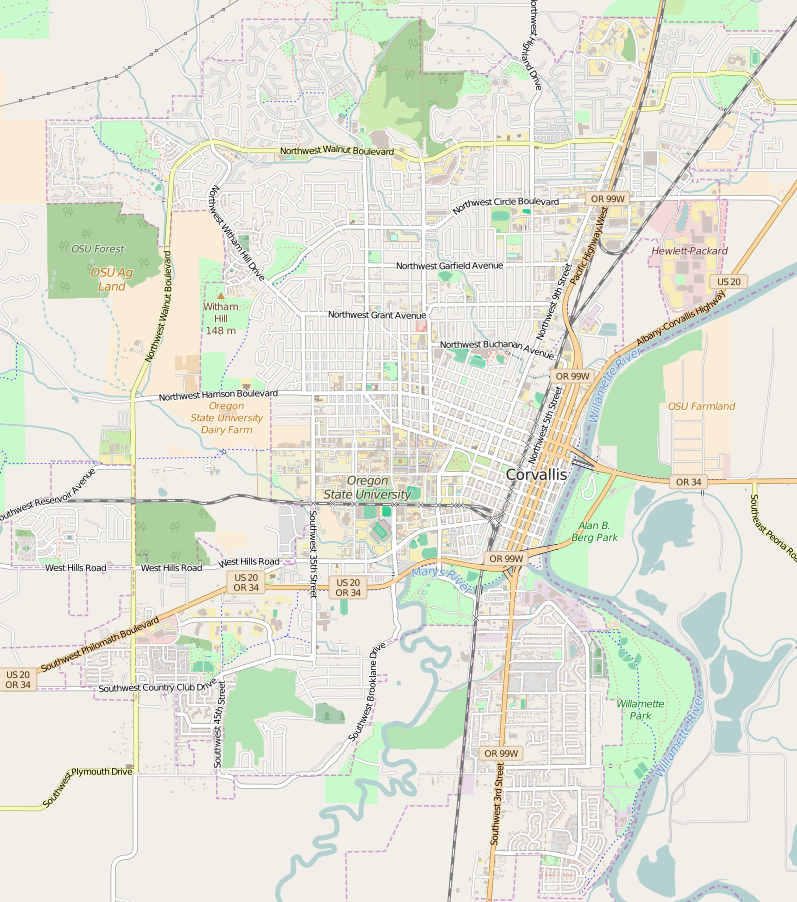
- Location within Corvallis OR Location within Oregon
- Location: 833 NW Buchanan Ave., Corvallis, Oregon
- Coordinates: 44°34′32″N 123°15′34″W
- Area: less than one acre
- Built: 1922
- Architect: Traver, Lou
- Architectural style: English Cottage
- NRHP reference No.: 81000471
- Added to NRHP: December 9, 1981

The Dr. Ralph Lyman Bosworth House, located in Corvallis, Oregon, United States, is a house listed on the National Register of Historic Places.

== See also ==
- National Register of Historic Places listings in Benton County, Oregon
