= Julian Hotel =

- U.S. National Register of Historic Places
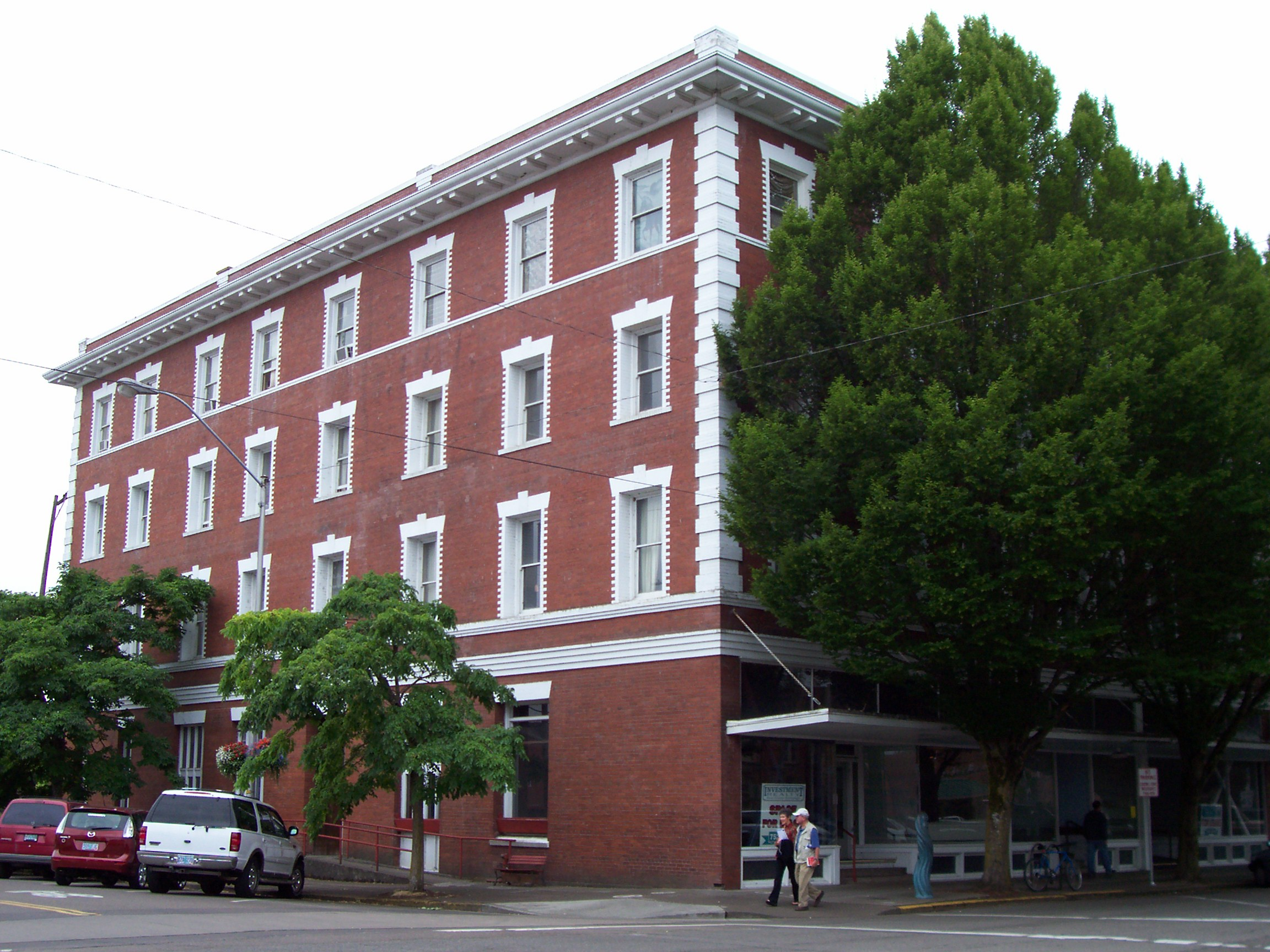
- Julian Hotel in 2009

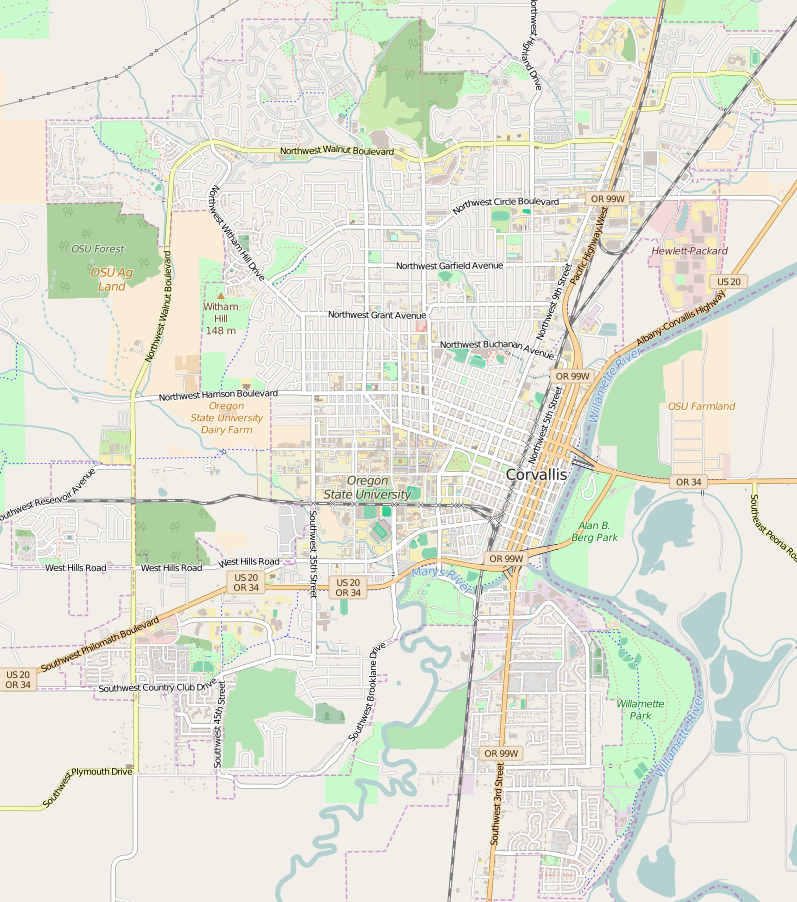
- Location within Corvallis OR Location within Oregon
- Location: 105 SW 2nd St., Corvallis, Oregon
- Coordinates: 44°33′50″N 123°15′30″W
- Area: less than one acre
- Built: 1893
- Architect: McClaran, Elmer E.
- Architectural style: Colonial Revival
- NRHP reference No.: 84002933
- Added to NRHP: March 22, 1984

The Julian Hotel, located in Corvallis, Oregon, is listed on the National Register of Historic Places. The building was first constructed in 1892 (named Hotel Corvallis), before a major remodel in 1911 changed the name and style of the building as well as added a fourth floor.

== History ==
=== Hotel Corvallis ===
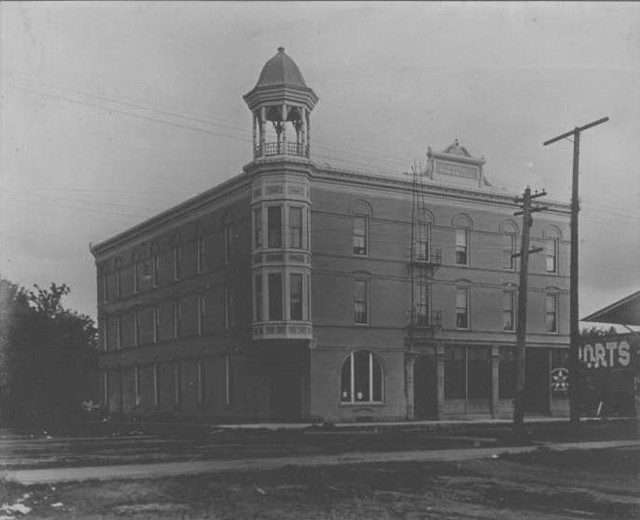
Hotel Corvallis - 1895

Construction of the original three story hotel was completed in 1892, on the corner of what is now Monroe Avenue and 2nd Street. The original name for the hotel was Hotel Corvallis. The original architect of the Hotel Corvallis is unknown. Hotel Corvallis was a wooden framed structure with a brick facade. The exterior of the hotel was a very ornate Queen Anne style structure, with many Victorian details. The most prominent feature was a corner entrance with a tower bay on second and third floors topped by open cupola, extending a full floor above the roofline of the hotel. This turret was used as a viewing platform for guests. An elaborate pediment on the Second Street side of the hotel bore the name "Hotel / Corvallis".

=== Major Remodel and Renaming ===
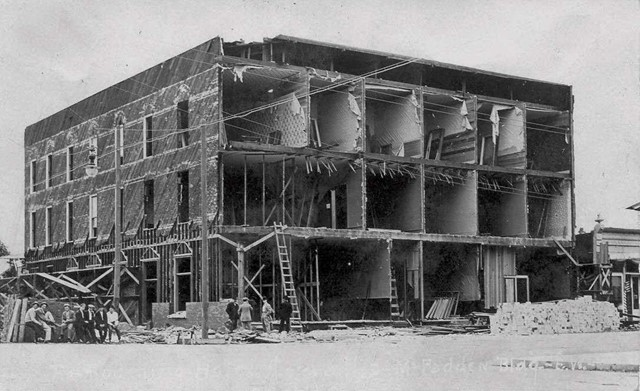
Hotel Corvallis during major remodel

In 1910, a major overhaul of the existing structure began under direction of architect Elmer E. McClaran, a Portland, Oregon base architect. The remodel to the structure was completed in 1911, with the hotel being transformed in the Colonial style. This overhaul of the structure removed almost all of the Victorian details of the original hotel, most notably the corner bump-out and turret. A fourth floor was added during this major overhaul. This addition brought the room count of the hotel to 100. The remodel also brought with it a large dining hall, that seated up to 300 patrons. This dining hall was advertised at its grand re-opening as having “13 waitresses and 1 Chinese servant”. Once completed, the hotel was renamed after its owner, State Senator Julian N. McFadden.

=== National Register of Historic Places listing ===
The hotel building was added to the National Register of Historic Places in March of 1984.

== See Also ==
- National Register of Historic Places listings in Benton County, Oregon
