= Elias Woodward House =

Historic house in Oregon, United States

- U.S. National Register of Historic Places
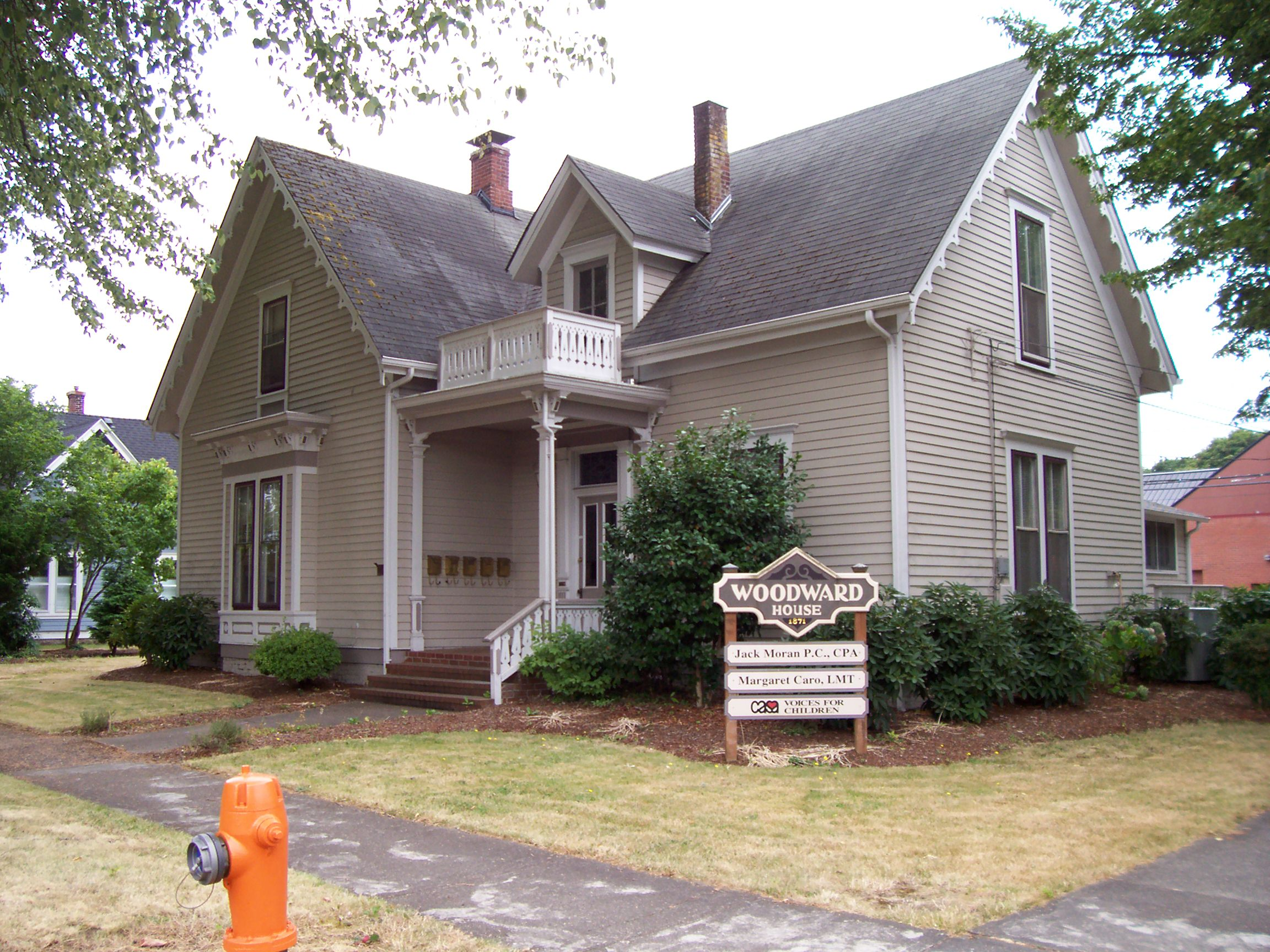

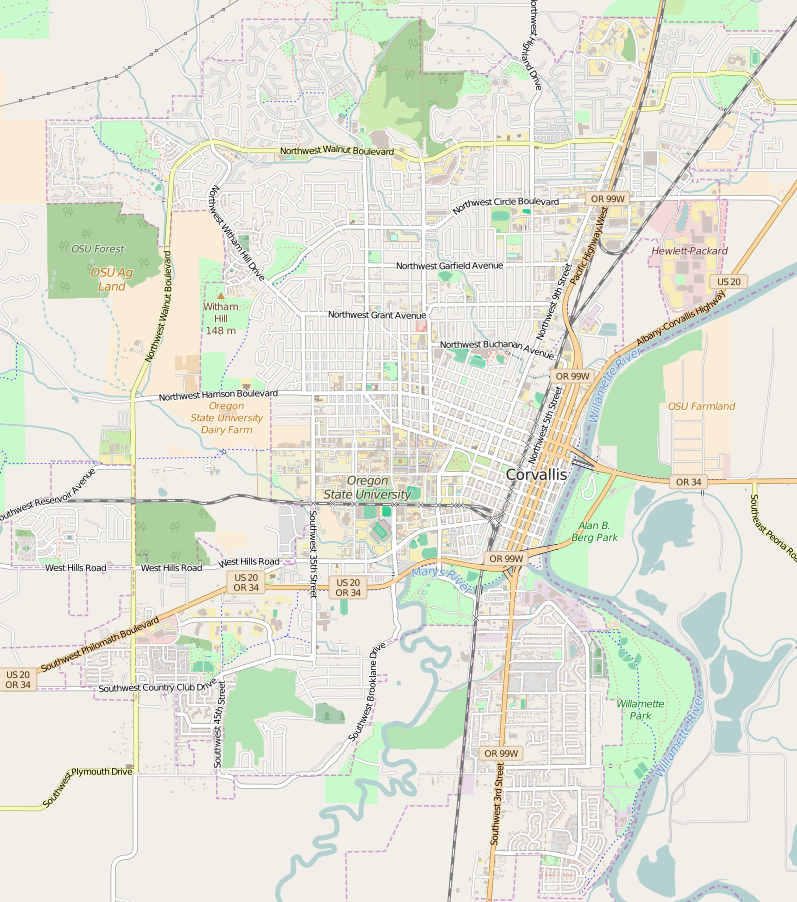
- Location within Corvallis OR Location within Oregon
- Location: 442 NW 4th St., Corvallis, Oregon
- Coordinates: 44°34′7″N 123°15′32″W
- Built: 1871
- Architectural style: Gothic, Rural Gothic
- NRHP reference No.: 83002143
- Added to NRHP: August 11, 1983

The Elias Woodward House, also known as Woodward-Gellatly House, in Corvallis, Oregon was built in 1871, in a Gothic or Rural Gothic architectural style.

It was designated by the City of Corvallis as a Historic Resource on December 2, 1982.

It was further listed on the U.S. National Register of Historic Places in 1983.
