= Monroe, Oregon =

City in Benton County, Oregon

- City
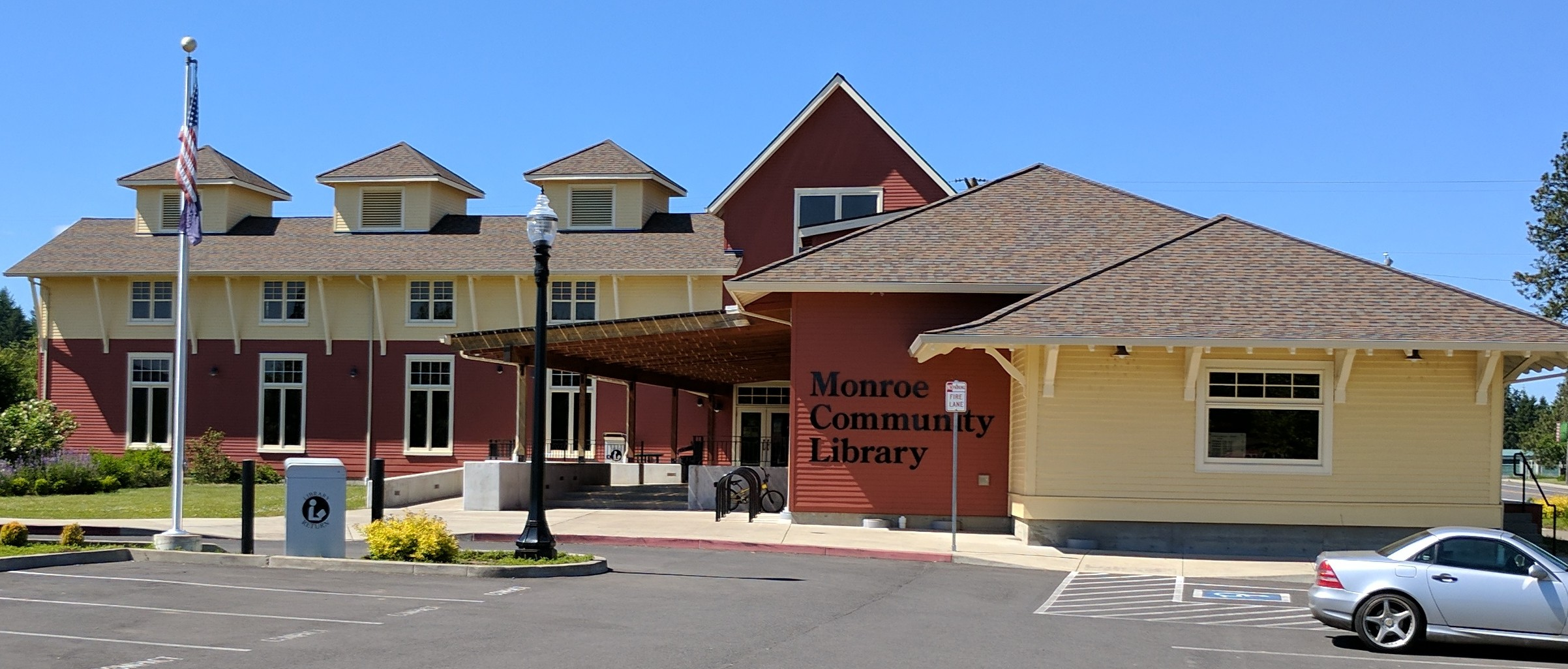
- Monroe community library

- Location in Oregon
- Coordinates: 44°19′01″N 123°17′56″W
- Country: United States
- State: Oregon
- County: Benton
- Incorporated: 1914

Government
  - Mayor: Dan Sheets

Area
  - Total: 0.51 sq mi (1.33 km^{2})
  - Land: 0.51 sq mi (1.33 km^{2})
  - Water: 0 sq mi (0.00 km^{2})
- Elevation: 292 ft (89 m)

Population (2020)
  - Total: 647
  - Estimate (2023): 763
  - Density: 1,257.1/sq mi (485.38/km^{2})
- Time zone: UTC-8 (Pacific)
  - Summer (DST): UTC-7 (Pacific)
- ZIP code: 97456
- Area code: 541
- FIPS code: 41-49600
- GNIS feature ID: 2411135
- Website: monroeoregon.gov

Monroe is a city in Benton County, Oregon, United States. The population was 763 as of the 2023 census population estimates. It is part of the Corvallis, Oregon Metropolitan Statistical Area. Monroe is located midway between Eugene and Corvallis along Highway 99W.

== Geography ==
According to the United States Census Bureau, the city has a total area of 0.51 square miles (1.32 km^{2}), all of it land.

== History ==
The city was formed around a small sawmill established by Joseph White in 1852. By 1853, there was a small settlement known as White's Mill. Around the same time, Roland Hinton formed the town of Starr Point north of White's Mill. In 1857, Starr Point combined with White's Mill to form the town of Monroe. The city quickly became a center for paddle boat traffic.

It was one of the largest cities in the state for many years. Monroe High School was built in the 1920s. Since the construction of the Interstate 5 highway in the 1960s, the city has turned into a rural farming community. It is the site of the historic Hull-Oakes Lumber Mill, the only steam-powered sawmill operating in the U.S.

== Demographics ==
Historical population
Census	Pop.	Note	%±
1880	135		—
1920	191		—
1930	227		18.8%
1940	311		37.0%
1950	362		16.4%
1960	374		3.3%
1970	443		18.4%
1980	412		−7.0%
1990	448		8.7%
2000	607		35.5%
2010	617		1.6%
2020	647		4.9%
U.S. Decennial Census

=== 2020 census ===
As of the 2020 census, Monroe had a population of 647. The median age was 35.8 years; 23.2% of residents were under the age of 18 and 16.5% were 65 years of age or older. For every 100 females there were 93.1 males, and for every 100 females age 18 and over there were 93.4 males.

0% of residents lived in urban areas, while 100.0% lived in rural areas.

There were 257 households in Monroe, of which 30.4% had children under the age of 18 living in them. Of all households, 44.7% were married-couple households, 18.7% were households with a male householder and no spouse or partner present, and 23.3% were households with a female householder and no spouse or partner present. About 26.8% of all households were made up of individuals and 10.5% had someone living alone who was 65 years of age or older.

There were 281 housing units, of which 8.5% were vacant. Among occupied housing units, 66.1% were owner-occupied and 33.9% were renter-occupied. The homeowner vacancy rate was 1.1% and the rental vacancy rate was 4.3%.

Racial composition as of the 2020 census
Race	Number	Percent
White	487	75.3%
Black or African American	1	0.2%
American Indian and Alaska Native	10	1.5%
Asian	6	0.9%
Native Hawaiian and Other Pacific Islander	2	0.3%
Some other race	59	9.1%
Two or more races	82	12.7%
Hispanic or Latino (of any race)	123	19.0%

=== 2010 census ===
At the 2010 census, there were 617 people, 251 households and 165 families residing in the city. The population density was 1,209.8 people per square mile (467.1 people/km^{2}). There were 277 housing units at an average density of 543.1 units per square mile (209.7 units/km^{2}). The racial make-up of the city was 89.0% White, 0.2% African American, 1.3% Native American, 0.2% Asian, 6.6% from other races, and 2.8% from two or more races. Hispanic or Latino people of any race were 16.2% of the population.

There were 251 households, of which 26.7% had children under the age of 18 living with them, 46.6% were married couples living together, 12.0% had a female householder with no husband present, 7.2% had a male householder with no wife present and 34.3% were non-families. 25.1% of all households were made up of individuals, and 8% had someone living alone who was 65 years of age or older. The average household size was 2.46 and the average family size was 2.92.

The median age was 42.7 years. 21.6% of residents were under the age of 18, 7.7% were between the ages of 18 and 24, 23.7% were from 25 to 44, 33.7% were from 45 to 64 and 13.1% were 65 years of age or older. The sex makeup of the city was 50.2% male and 49.8% female.

=== 2000 census ===
At the 2000 census, there were 607 people, 225 households, and 166 families residing in the city. The population density was 1,274.9 people per square mile (492.2 people/km^{2}). There were 262 housing units at an average density of 550.3 units per square mile (212.5 units/km^{2}). The racial make-up of the city was 96.71% White, 0.33% African American, 0.99% Native American, 0.33% Asian, 0.33% Pacific Islander and 1.32% from two or more races. Hispanic or Latino people of any race were 10.05% of the population.

There were 225 households, of which 39.6% had children under the age of 18 living with them, 57.3% were married couples living together, 11.6% had a female householder with no husband present and 25.8% were non-families. 20.9% of all households were made up of individuals, and 7.1% had someone living alone who was 65 years of age or older. The average household size was 2.70 and the average family size was 3.07.

29.7% of the population were under the age of 18, 9.2% from 18 to 24, 29.5% from 25 to 44, 23.2% from 45 to 64 and 8.4% were 65 years of age or older. The median age was 35 years. For every 100 females, there were 109.3 males. For every 100 females aged 18 and over, there were 99.5 males.

The median household income was $30,625 and the median family income was $40,714. Males had a median income of $32,083 and females $22,083. The per capita income was $14,970. About 12.3% of families and 12.6% of the population were below the poverty line, including 18.5% of those under age 18 and 14.0% of those age 65 or over.

== Notable people ==
- Willis C. Hawley, a member of the United States House of Representatives from 1909 to 1933
- Dave Wolverton, writer and novelist
