= Fisher, Oregon =

Unincorporated community in Oregon, United States

- Unincorporated place
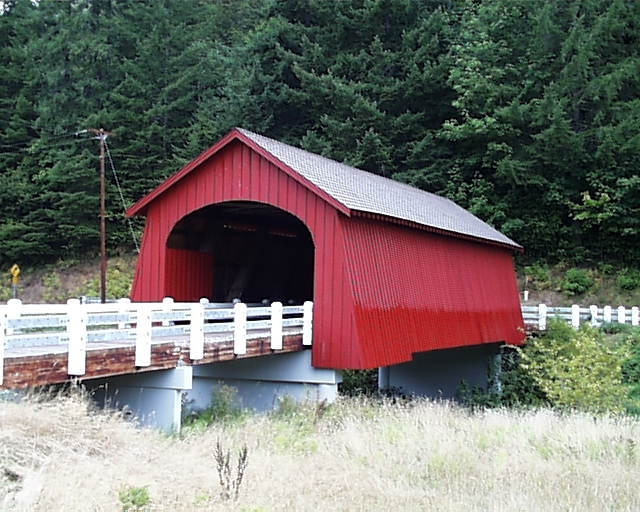
- Fisher School Bridge crosses Five Rivers at Fisher

- Location within Oregon Location within the United States
- Coordinates: 44°17′34″N 123°50′39.3″W
- Country: United States
- State: Oregon
- County: Lincoln
- Elevation: 236 ft (72 m)
- Time zone: UTC-8 (Pacific (PST))
  - Summer (DST): UTC-7 (PDT)
- ZIP code: 97390
- Area code: 541
- GNIS feature ID: 1142172
- Coordinates and elevation from United States Geological Survey

Fisher is an unincorporated community in rural Lincoln County, Oregon, United States. Fisher lies along Five Rivers Road, 9.2 miles (14.8 km) south of its intersection with Oregon Route 34. It is slightly north of the Lincoln–Lane county line in the Siuslaw National Forest. A stream called Five Rivers flows west through Fisher, about 12 miles (19 km) by water from the stream's mouth on the Alsea River. Route 34 runs along the Alsea River between Alsea and Waldport.

Fisher School Bridge crosses Five Rivers at Fisher. The bridge takes its name from Fisher Elementary School across Crab Creek Road, today a residence. Alternatively, the bridge is sometimes called Five Rivers Bridge and Fisher Covered Bridge. A post office named Fisher was established in this area (44.293015, -123.844390) in 1892 and closed in 1942. Martin Johanson was the first postmaster. A general mercantile store operated in Fisher, along the road near the mouth of Crab Creek. The building stood until road improvements widened the right of way.

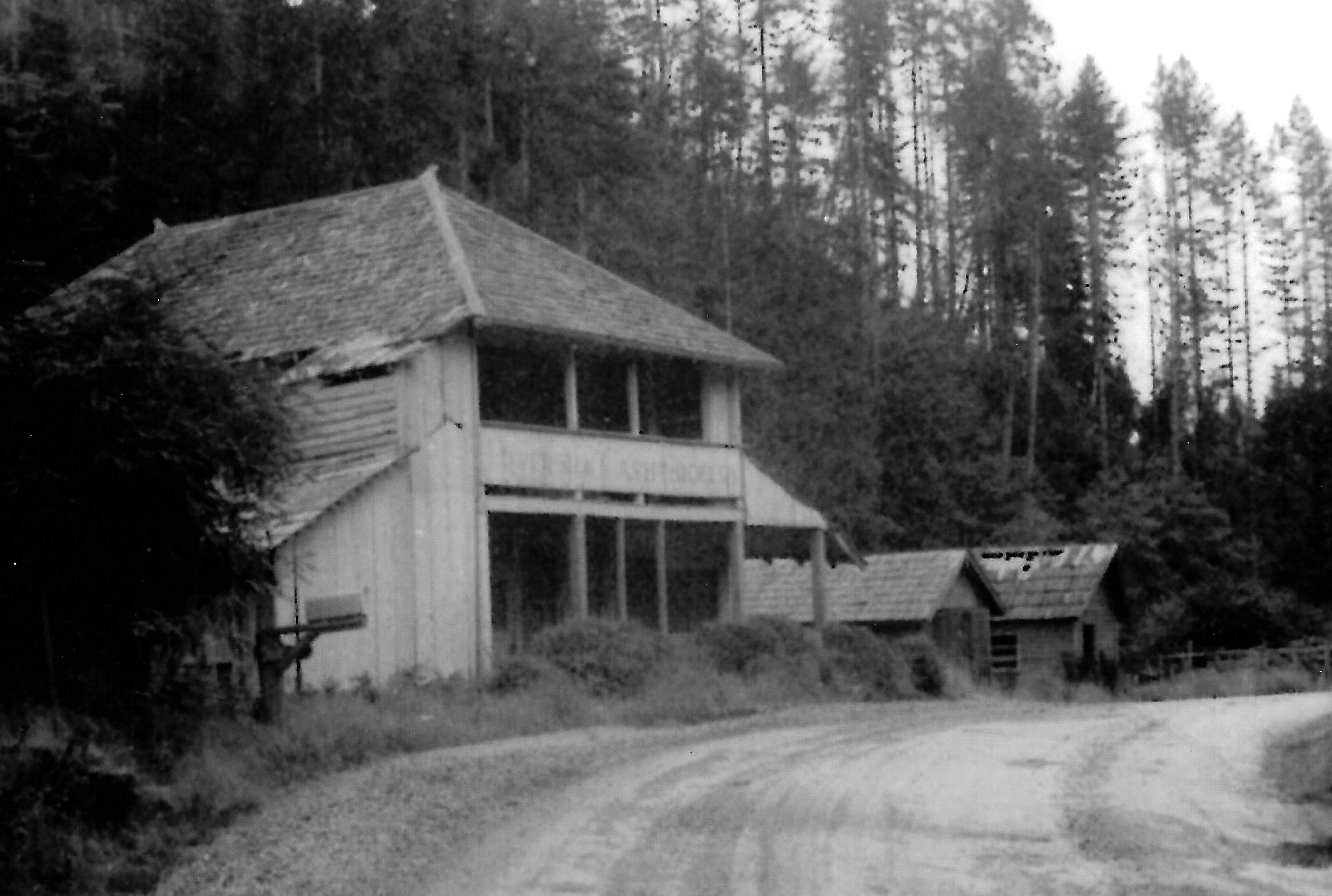
Historic image of Fisher store.

== Name ==
Fisher was named for the fisher (Martes pennanti), a cat-sized animal in the same family as the weasel, badger, otter, and mink. Once much more common in the virgin forests of the Oregon Coast Range, it was driven to near extinction in these mid-elevation mountains by habitat destruction, trapping, and poison baits meant to kill coyotes and wolves. The animals are still sighted rarely in the immediate area.
