= North Fork Alsea River =

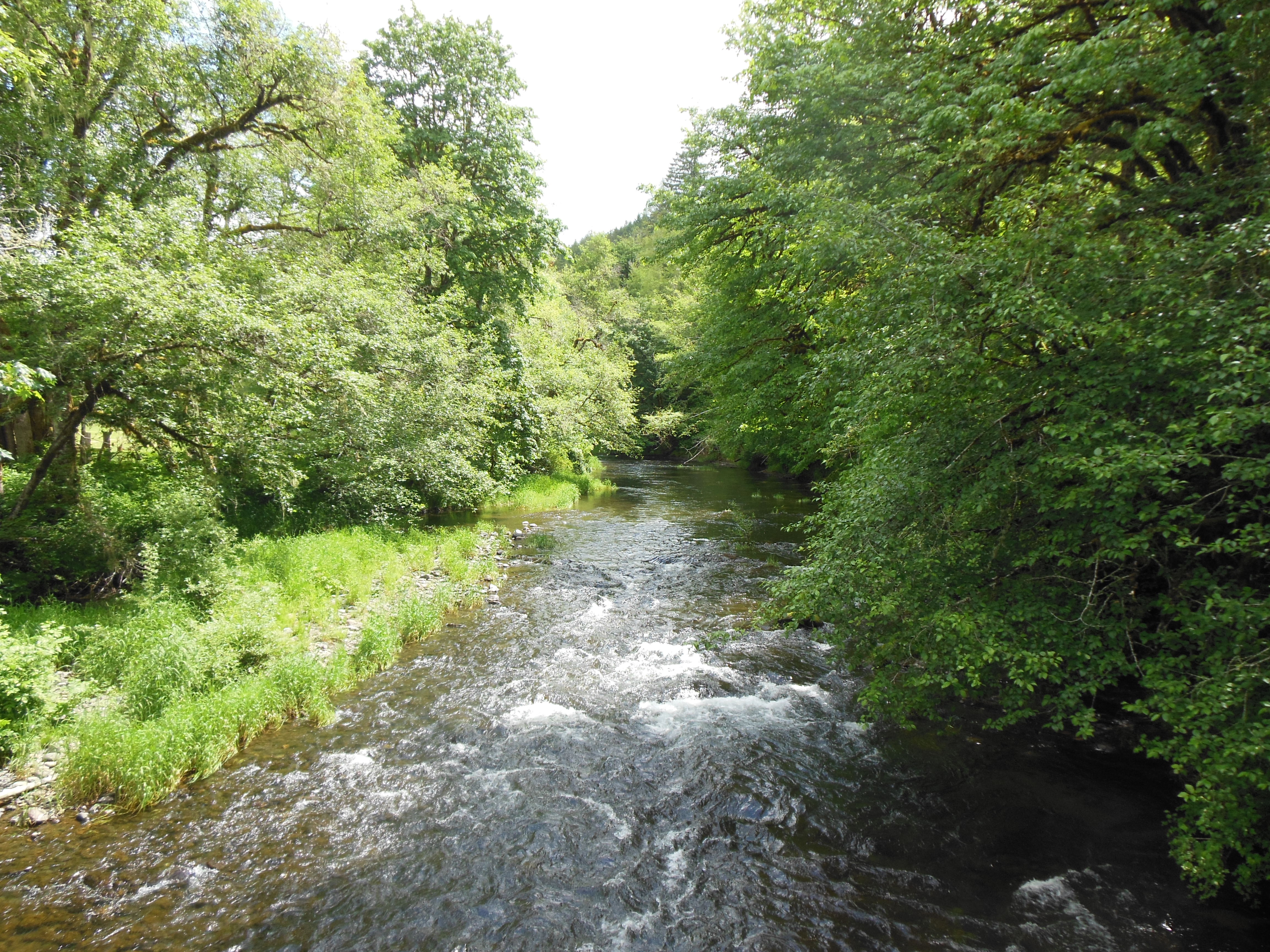
- The North Fork Alsea River at Clemens Park in Benton County

- Location of the mouth of North Fork Alsea River in Oregon
- Etymology: Alsi, said to be a corruption of Alsea for native people who lived near the mouth of the river

Location
- Country: United States
- State: Oregon
- County: Lincoln and Benton

Physical characteristics
- Source: Klickitat Lake
  - location: Central Oregon Coast Range, Lincoln County
  - coordinates: 44°28′40″N 123°39′26″W
  - elevation: 1,171 ft (357 m)
- Mouth: Alsea River
  - location: near Alsea, Benton County
  - coordinates: 44°22′34″N 123°36′10″W
  - elevation: 272 ft (83 m)
- Length: 16 mi (26 km)

The North Fork Alsea River is a 16-mile (26 km) tributary of the Alsea River in the U.S. state of Oregon. It begins at Klickitat Lake, fed by Klickitat and Lake creeks in the Central Oregon Coast Range, and flows generally south to near Alsea, where it joins the South Fork Alsea River to form the main stem. For most of its course, the North Fork winds through the Siuslaw National Forest in Lincoln County and then Benton County. It passes under Oregon Route 34 northeast of Alsea.

The Alsea Hatchery, constructed by the state in 1936, raises winter steelhead and other rainbow trout along the North Fork. According to Fishing in Oregon, the river is a "beautiful stream (well-suited to fly angling) with a large run of hatchery winter steelhead." The stream also supports populations of wild cutthroat trout. It is closed to salmon fishing or fishing from a floating device.

Clemens Park, a Benton County park of about 38 acres (15 ha), lies along the North Fork and Route 34 near Alsea. Amenities include picnic tables, restrooms, a self-guided nature trail, fishing and "areas for water play".

== Tributaries ==
Listed from source to mouth, the named tributaries begin with Klickitat and Lake creeks, which form Klickitat Lake, the headwaters of the North Fork Alsea River. Downstream of the lake, Sweethome and Slide creeks enter from the left; Easter and Gravel creeks, right; Bailey, Crooked, and Seeley creeks, left; Hayden and Ryder creeks, right; Honey Grove Creek, left, and Kiger Creek, right.

== See also ==
- List of rivers of Oregon
