= Green River (Oregon) =

River in Oregon, United States

- Location of the mouth of the Green River in Oregon

Location
- Country: United States
- State: Oregon
- County: Lane

Physical characteristics
- Source: Central Oregon Coast Range
  - location: Siuslaw National Forest
  - coordinates: 44°13′51″N 123°53′12″W
  - elevation: 1,162 ft (354 m)
- Mouth: Five Rivers
  - coordinates: 44°16′30″N 123°47′45″W
  - elevation: 256 ft (78 m)

The Green River is a tributary of Five Rivers in the U.S. state of Oregon. It arises in the Siuslaw National Forest of the Central Oregon Coast Range and flows generally northeast to meet Five Rivers upstream of the rural community of Fisher. The confluence is about 15 miles (24 km) from the larger stream's confluence with the Alsea River. The Green River's named tributaries from source to mouth are the East Fork Green River and Ryan Creek.

== See also ==
- List of rivers of Oregon
