= Hayden Bridge (Alsea, Oregon) =

Covered bridge in Oregon, US

- U.S. National Register of Historic Places
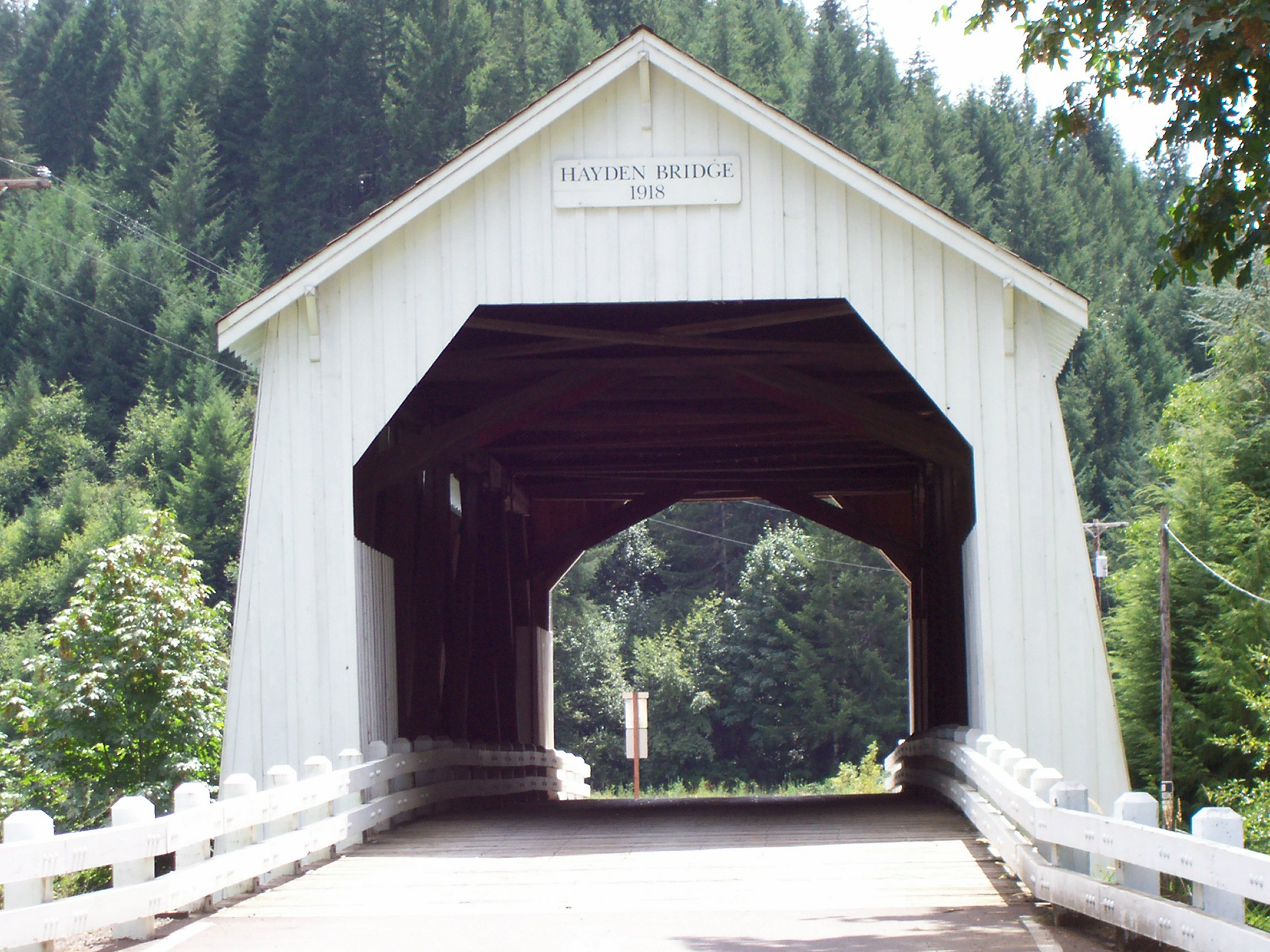
- Hayden Bridge
- Location: Alsea River at Hayden Road
- Nearest city: Alsea, Oregon
- Coordinates: 44°22′59.3″N 123°37′50.4″W
- Built: 1918
- Architectural style: Howe truss
- NRHP reference No.: 79002034
- Added to NRHP: November 29, 1979

Hayden Bridge, a Howe truss structure, spans the Alsea River about 2 miles (3 km) west of Alsea, Oregon, United States. Constructed in 1918, the 91-foot (28 m) span is one of only seven remaining covered bridges in Oregon that were built before 1920. Similar spans such as the Mill Creek Bridge crossed the Alsea or one of its tributaries in the same vicinity, but only the Hayden Bridge has survived. It was added to the National Register of Historic Places in 1979.

Located along Hayden Road just south of Oregon Route 34, the bridge was either partly or completely rebuilt in 1945. Changes included larger and less rounded bridge portals that could accommodate larger vehicles. Narrow openings under the side-wall eaves on both sides of the span illuminated the interior. The bridge, repaired again in 2003, required further work in 2006 after a logging truck crashed into it.

Of the more than 600 covered bridges once found in Oregon, only 50 remain. After 1915, although some were of queen-post or king-post design, most of the new covered bridges were of Howe-truss design. In that year, the Oregon legislature passed a law giving the Oregon State Highway Department oversight powers for bridges worth more than $500. The department developed plans for Howe-truss bridges, partly because they were relatively easy to assemble, and distributed them to the state's counties. Many of these bridges, often built with Douglas-fir timber available locally, were replaced in the 1940s and 1950s by bridges more suited to logging trucks and other big vehicles. Although most of the original bridges no longer exist, the remaining bridges have gained value as tourist attractions.

== See also ==
- National Register of Historic Places listings in Benton County, Oregon
- List of bridges on the National Register of Historic Places in Oregon
- List of Oregon covered bridges
