= Lewis Southworth =

American pioneer (1830–1917)

Lewis (or Louis) Alexander Southworth
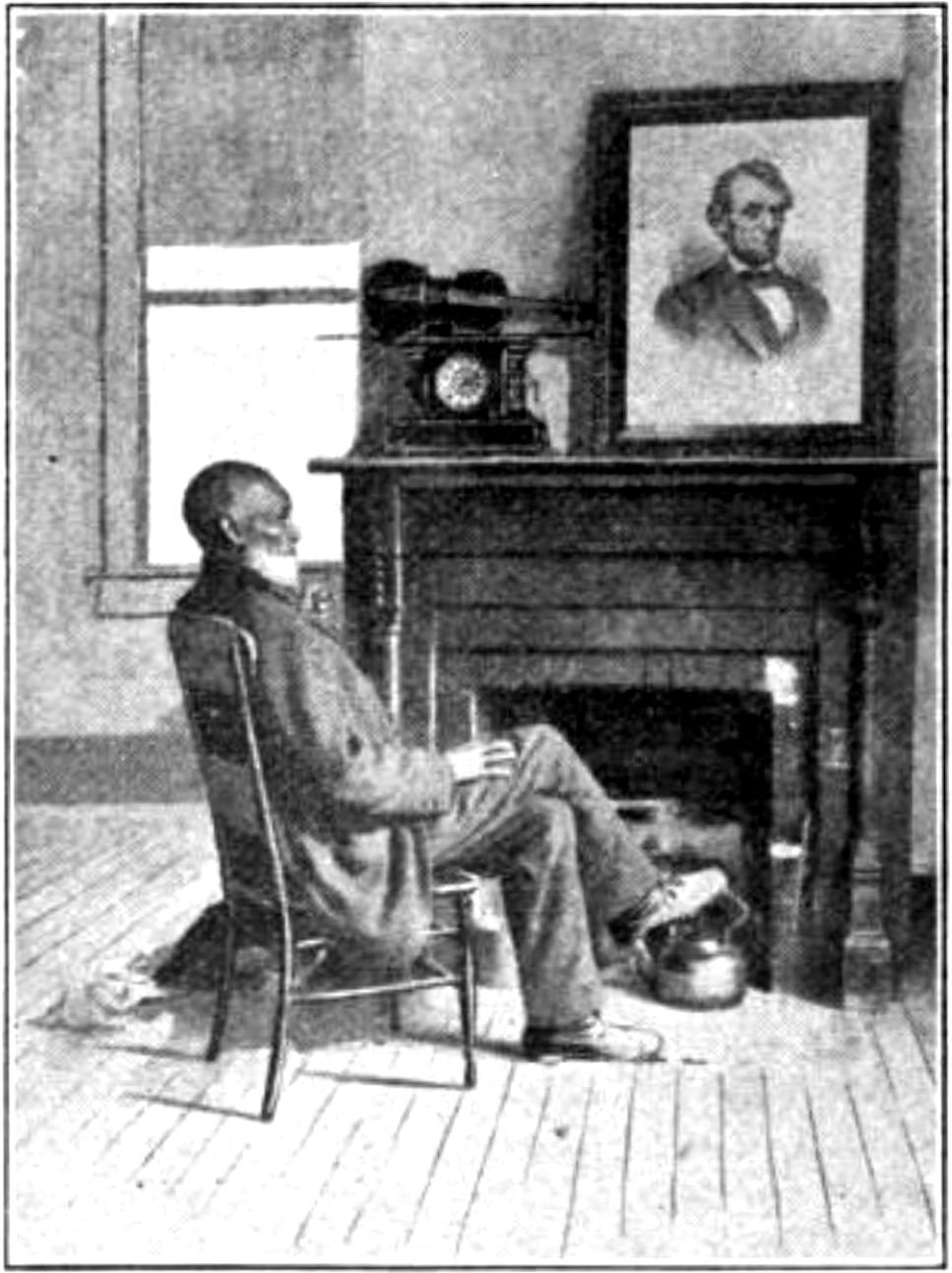
- Born: July 4, 1829; Tennessee
- Died: June 28, 1917; Corvallis, Oregon
- Resting place: Crystal Springs Cemetery in Corvallis
- Occupations: Enslaved, farmer, blacksmith, fiddler
- Known for: Oregon pioneer
- Spouse(s): Mary Cooper, Josephine Jackson
- Parent(s): Pauline and Louis Hunter

Lewis Southworth, also identified as Louis Southworth (July 4, 1830– June 28, 1917), was an American pioneer in Oregon who settled a donation land claim in 1880 near Waldport in the U.S. state of Oregon. Southworth was born into slavery in Tennessee and brought to the Oregon Territory by his enslaver, from whom he bought his freedom with cash, earned chiefly from his expertise with the fiddle or violin. Southworth lived or worked near Monroe, Jacksonville, and Buena Vista before settling along a small tributary of the Alsea River, where he farmed and engaged in other enterprises and civic undertakings. After his first wife died in 1901, Southworth bought a house in Corvallis, where he lived for the rest of his life and married his second wife.

Southworth was the first Black member of the Oregon militia. Southworth Creek, a small tributary of the Alsea River, is named in his honor.

== Move to the West ==
In 1853, James Southworth, a Tennessee enslaver, brought Southworth to the Oregon Territory as an enslaved man. Slavery was not legal in the territory, and Black people were prohibited from settling in the area. Efforts to discourage Black people and their descendants from moving to Oregon continued through at least 1926, when the Oregon Black exclusion laws were repealed.

In 1854 Lewis Southworth settled on an abandoned donation land claim near Monroe, in Lane County. According to an article in The Old Time Herald, James Southworth, thought to be cash-poor, lived with Lewis on the Richardson claim. Shortly thereafter, Lewis traveled to the gold fields near Jacksonville, where he earned $300 that he remitted to James in partial payment for his freedom.

While returning from Jacksonville to Monroe, Lewis encountered soldiers fighting in the Rogue River Wars who threatened to confiscate his rifle. To avoid proceeding unarmed, Southworth joined the militia, fought against the Native American tribes commonly grouped under the designation of Rogue River Indians, and was subsequently wounded in a skirmish in 1856. He was the first Black member of the Oregon militia.

Soon the James Southworth family moved again, this time to California to try gold mining, taking Lewis with them. While mining in Yreka, Lewis found fiddle playing was more lucrative than looking for gold, and he subsequently taught violin and played for dance schools in Yreka and in Virginia City, Nevada. In this way, Lewis earned enough to pay James Southworth another $700 to be manumitted sometime between 1855 and 1859, though the dates are not clear..

After manumitting Lewis Southworth, James Southworth circulated a petition in Lane Country, Oregon, to protect "slave property." The petition made its way to the state legislature, but was not adopted.

== Later life ==
Lewis Southworth returned to Oregon, and by 1870 he was running a livery stable in Buena Vista and working as a blacksmith. He married Mary Cooper in 1873 and helped raise her adopted son, Alvin McCleary. Under provisions of the Homestead Act of 1862, Southworth acquired a land grant near the Alsea River upstream of Waldport, where he farmed, fished, hunted, built a sawmill, became active in community affairs, and played the fiddle for dances. He donated land for a school near Waldport and served as a chairman of the school board.

After Cooper died in 1901, Southworth moved to Corvallis, where he bought and lived in a house at the corner of Southwest Fourth Street and Adams Avenue. In 1913 he married his second wife, Josephine Jackson. He died in 1917 and is buried in Corvallis' Crystal Springs Cemetery next to his first wife.

== Legacy ==
Southworth's home in Lincoln County was named Darkey Road, and the nearby creek, Darkey Creek after him. On the recommendation of the Oregon Geographic Names Board, it was changed by the U.S. Board on Geographic Names to Southworth Creek in 2000.

In 2021 it was announced that a 12-acre park in Waldport would be named in Southworth's honor. A bronze sculpture of Southworth will be at the entrance of the park.
