= Avery–Helm Historic District =

Historic district in Oregon, United States

- U.S. National Register of Historic Places
- U.S. Historic district
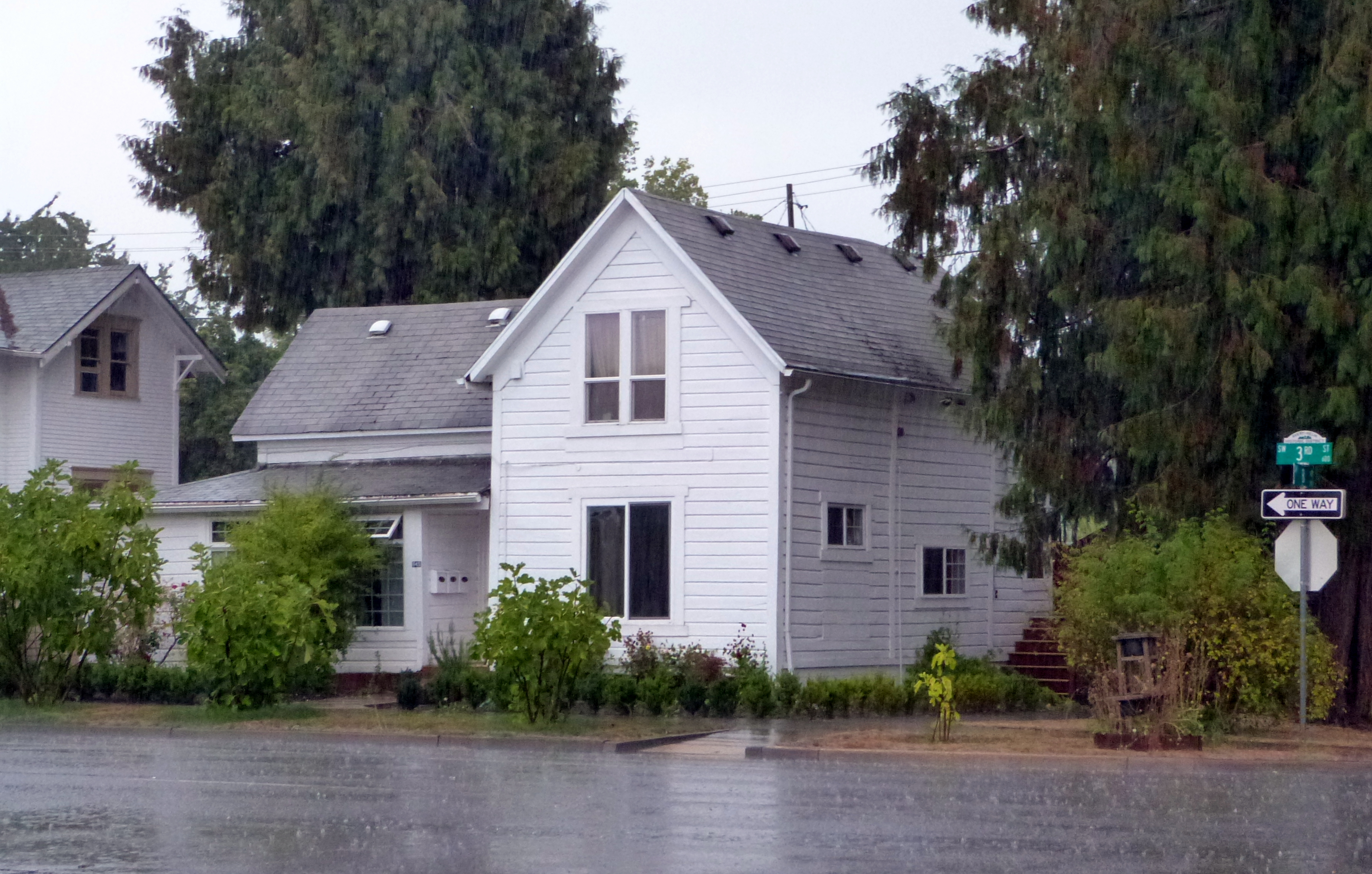
- The historic district's Mary G. Reed House (historic name, ca. 1905) in 2013.

- Location within Oregon Location within the United States

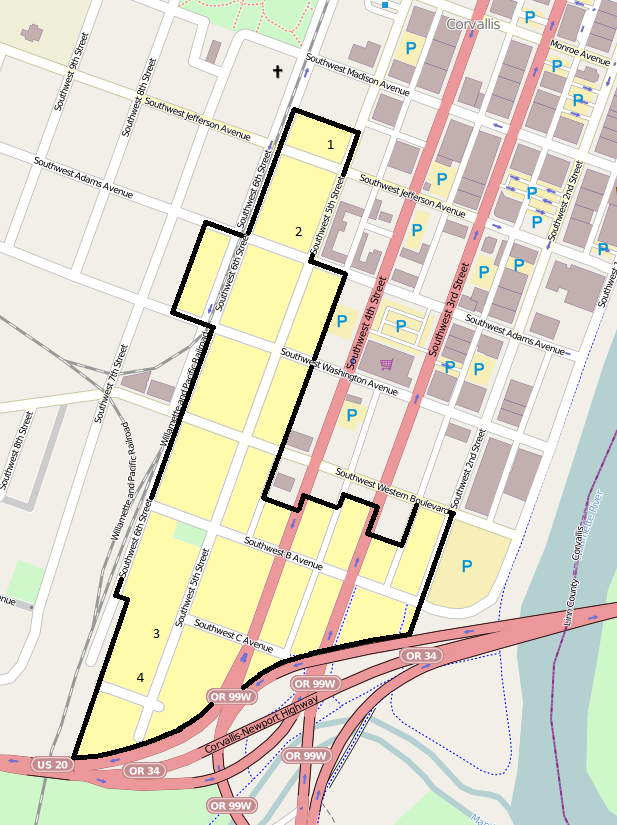
- The Avery–Helm Historic District boundaries in Corvallis.
- Location: Corvallis, Oregon, roughly bounded by SW 2nd, 6th, and Jefferson Streets, and the Highway 20/34 Bypass
- Coordinates: 44°33′32″N 123°15′58″W
- Area: 34 acres (14 ha)
- Built: ca. 1870 – 1949
- Architectural style: Bungalow, vernacular, Italianate, Gothic Revival, Queen Anne, Colonial Revival, American Foursquare, others
- NRHP reference No.: 99001716
- Added to NRHP: January 27, 2000

The Avery–Helm Historic District comprises a primarily residential portion of central Corvallis, Oregon, United States. Located on several of Corvallis's earliest plats, the 122 historic houses remaining in the district (as of 1999) present a window into the domestic aspects of the city's development from 1870 to 1949, providing a full industrial, socioeconomic, and architectural profile of that period. The district was added to the National Register of Historic Places in 2000.

== See also ==
- National Register of Historic Places listings in Benton County, Oregon
- Dr. Henry S. Pernot House
