= Thomas Benton Slate =

American inventor and businessman

Thomas Benton Slate (December 2, 1880 – November 26, 1980) was an American inventor and businessman.

Slate was born in Tangent, Oregon, to Nathaniel Porter Slate and Alice Slate. and raised in Alsea, Oregon. He showed an early aptitude for inventing and adapting materials and processes.

== Dry ice ==
Slate made his largest fortune as the developer of dry ice, working on the East Coast. In 1924, he applied for a US patent to sell dry ice commercially. He became the first to make dry ice successful as an industry. In 1925, this solid form of CO_{2} was trademarked by the DryIce Corporation of America as "Dry ice", thus leading to its common name. The DryIce Company began marketing "dry ice" in 1925, for use in deep refrigeration.

== Lighter-than-airships ==
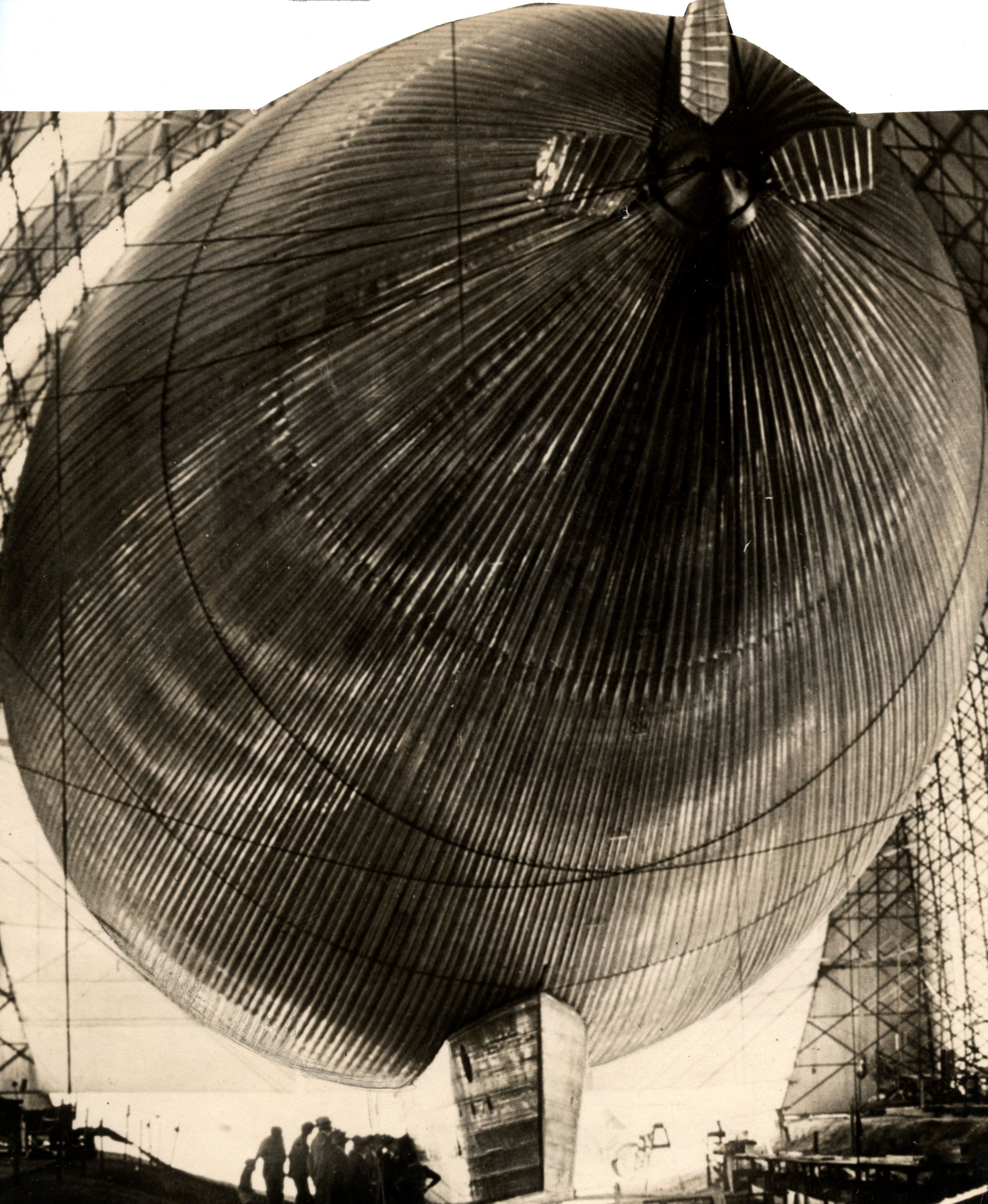
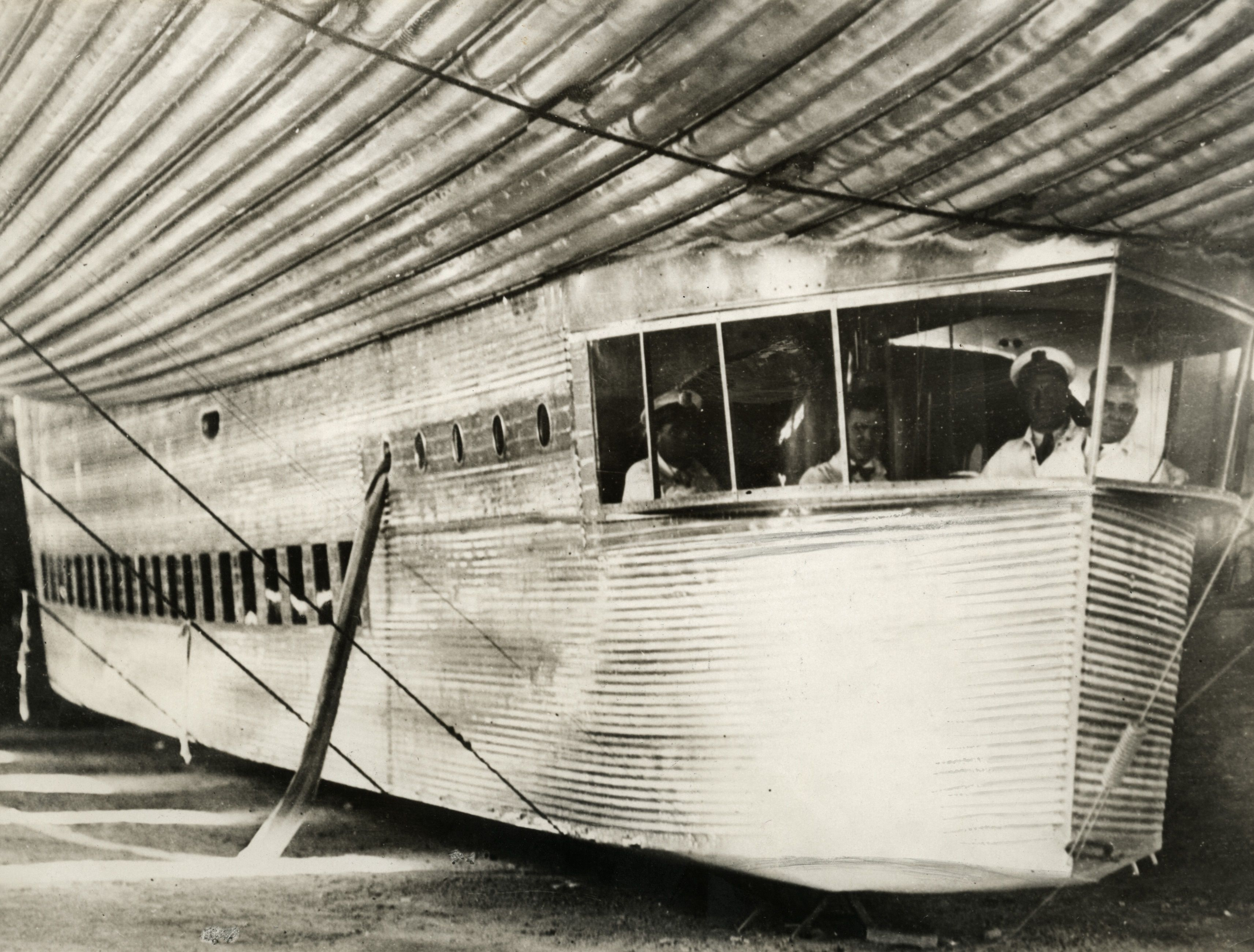
The City of Glendale (1928)

In 1925, Slate sold his business and relocated to Glendale, California, where he began touting a revolutionary concept. Lighter-than-air transport was in vogue, but airships were hampered by the inherent weakness of fabric-skin construction and leaky gasbags. Slate proposed fabricating the hull of 0.011-inch thick duralumin, which would be light enough to be viable, but strong enough and fireproof in order to use the more-readily-available hydrogen gas rather than helium.

Slate secured a section of land adjacent to Glendale's Grand Central Airport, large enough to construct a colossal hangar. He sold shares of stock in his new company, and as thanks for the support he received, he christened his airship City of Glendale.

Not content with merely revolutionizing the art of dirigible fabrication, Slate also proposed a non-traditional motive force. Steam from a flash boiler in the cabin would drive a nose-mounted blower at 6,000 revolutions/minute; the paddle-shaped blades would throw the air (ahead of the bow) outward, creating a low-pressure area into which the large dirigible body would be pushed (by the ambient atmospheric pressure on its rear surfaces). His "air displacement system" was predicted to propel the airship at 100 miles/hour (160 km/h). To boost thrust, he added an engine-driven pusher propeller at the rear.

Still more innovation was proposed: Slate's concept of "sustained flight" meant the airship would not need large mooring stations at its proposed destinations and enroute stops. Instead, passengers would be raised or lowered via a combination of anchor and elevator. A fuel tank, lowered by cable, served as the anchor; a capsule-like elevator would descend along the cable while the airship idled overhead. Slate portrayed his airship as being able to pluck patrons from decks of ocean liners, and roofs of luxury hotels, bypassing the need to travel to airports or other depots.

The airship was constructed at Glendale, and first brought outside on January 6, 1929. With a crowd watching, Slate's handlers released its restraining cables until the shiny unit rose to thirty feet above the concrete. The initial public appearance was an unmitigated success. However, problems with the steam-production equipment delayed flight testing until December, when Slate gave up on that system and installed an internal-combustion engine (a Wright Whirlwind) driving a conventional propeller to move the craft.

On December 17, the airship was moved outdoors, into an unseasonably hot sunny afternoon. Soon, the expanding hydrogen within the metal body raised the internal pressure to the point that it popped the emergency relief valves. The unit was moved back inside.

On December 19, the airship was moved outdoors again, with its engines running and propellers spinning as it was guided through the doors. Handlers positioned themselves and the unit for launching, but within five minutes the sun had again heated the internal gas. A staccato pop of rivets was followed by a metallic-sounding explosion and a vapor cloud as the gas escaped. The port side had failed; the side was distended, the duralumin ribs bulging and honeycombed with gaps.

The unit was dragged into the hangar, where an engineering assessment determined it was not repairable. Since the country was slipping into The Great Depression, no financing could be found to fund repairs, so the structure was sold for scrap ($0.60 per pound), the employees were discharged, and the Slate Dirigible Corporation was dissolved.

== Other ventures ==
In the mid-1950s, Slate was again in the California news, with a proposal to clear vital valley areas of the then-pervasive smog. His proposal to install "cyclone-producing devices" atop the mountains surrounding the valleys attracted some interest in the press, but no firm offers were received, and he dropped the idea.

Slate eventually returned to Oregon, where he lived a long life, a few days short of a century. He died in Corvallis, Oregon, on November 26, 1980.
