= Paris, Oregon =

Unincorporated community in the state of Oregon, United States

Coordinates: 44°15′09″N 123°46′14″W

Paris is an unincorporated community in Lane County, in the U.S. state of Oregon. It is a rural locale in the Central Oregon Coast Range north of the Siuslaw River and south of the Alsea River along one of its tributaries, Five Rivers.

== History ==
A post office called Paris was established in 1909, and remained in operation until it was discontinued in 1933. G. E. Parris, the first postmaster, gave the community its name.
