= Five Rivers =

Five Rivers may refer to:

- Five Rivers, New Brunswick, a Canadian village
- Five Rivers (Oregon), a river in the United States
- Punjab, a region in South Asia known as the Land of Five Rivers

== See also ==
- Five Rivers MetroParks, a parks district in the United States
