= South Fork Alsea River =

- Location of the mouth of South Fork Alsea River in Oregon
- Etymology: Alsi, said to be a corruption of Alsea for native people who lived near the mouth of the river

Location
- Country: United States
- State: Oregon
- County: Lane and Benton

Physical characteristics
- Source: Central Oregon Coast Range
  - location: northeast of Horton, Lane County
  - coordinates: 44°14′49″N 123°25′44″W
  - elevation: 1,721 ft (525 m)
- Mouth: Alsea River
  - location: near Alsea, Benton County
  - coordinates: 44°22′34″N 123°36′09″W
  - elevation: 282 ft (86 m)

The South Fork Alsea River is a tributary of the Alsea River in the U.S. state of Oregon. It begins at northeast of Horton on the east side of the Central Oregon Coast Range and flows generally northwest to near Alsea. There it joins the North Fork Alsea River to form the main stem.

Fishing in Oregon describes the South Fork as "fair-sized" stream with an average width of 40 feet (12 m). Fishing for wild cutthroat trout is "excellent", and the stream also supports a population of steelhead. The Bureau of Land Management (BLM) oversees much of the territory through which the river flows.

Alsea Falls Recreation Area, managed by the BLM, is along the river. Open from May 1 through October 31, it has campsites and day-use sites with tent pads, fire rings, picnic tables, toilets, and drinking water. Hiking trails from the recreation area through the forest lead to several waterfalls. The nearby Fall Creek Trail system for mountain bikes has 6.5 miles (10.5 km) of forested routes for all skill levels.

== Tributaries ==
Listed from source to mouth, the named tributaries are Williams, Coleman, and Fall creeks, which enter from the left; Peak Creek, right; Blackberry and Rock creeks, left; Dubuque Creek, right; Table Creek, left; Cedar and Headrick creeks, right, and Bummer Creek, left.

== See also ==
- List of rivers of Oregon
