= W. B. Nelson State Recreation Site =

State park in Oregon, United States

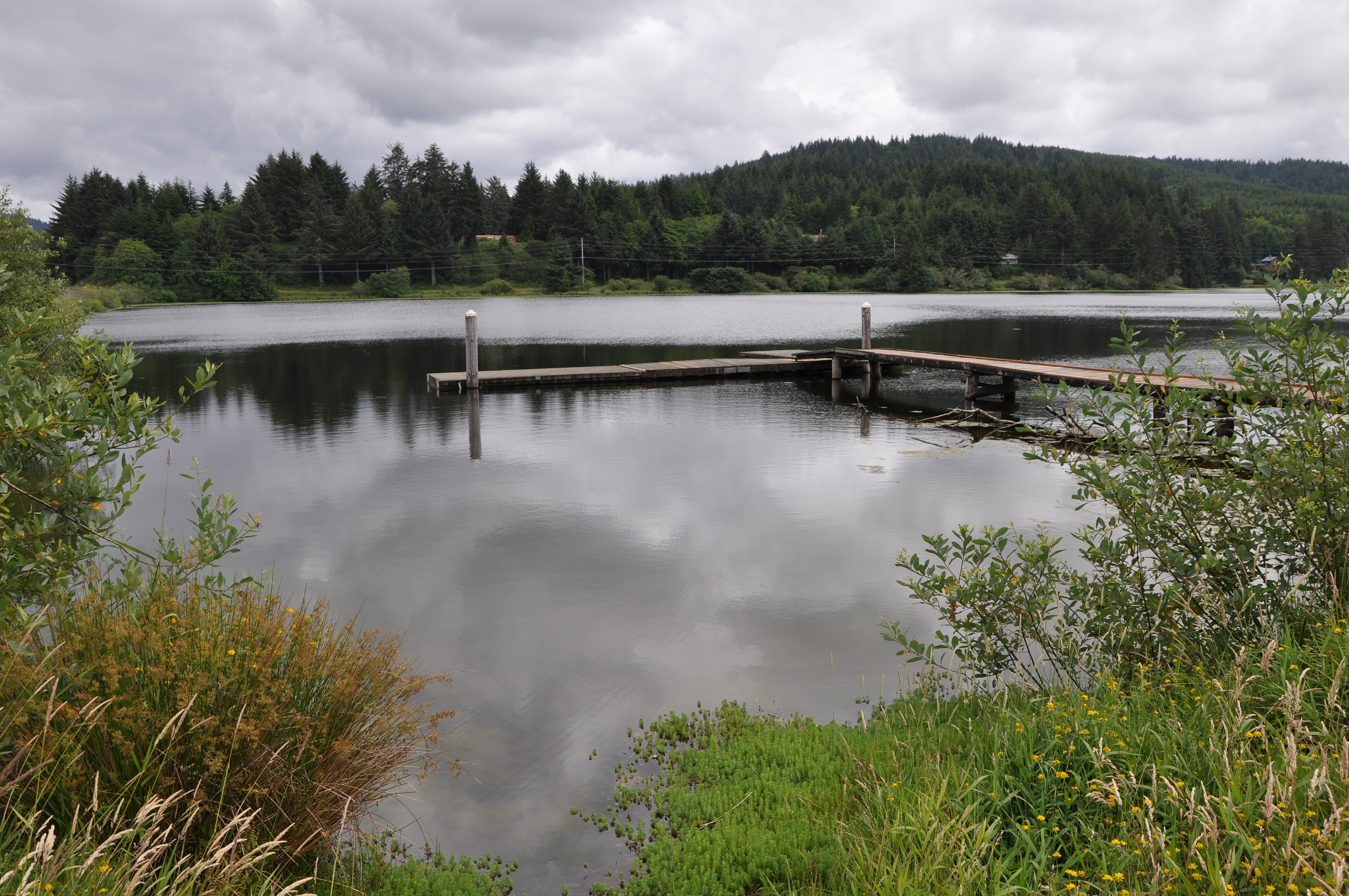
- Lake and dock at the park

- Location within Oregon Location within the United States
- Type: Public, state
- Location: Lincoln County, Oregon
- Nearest city: Waldport
- Coordinates: 44°24′54″N 124°02′08″W
- Operator: Oregon Parks and Recreation Department

W. B. Nelson State Recreation Site is a state park in Lincoln County, western Oregon.

It is on the lower Alsea River, near the coastal city of Waldport.

The park is administered by the Oregon Parks and Recreation Department.

== See also ==
- List of Oregon state parks
