= Southworth Creek =

- Location of the mouth of Southworth Creek in Oregon
- Etymology: For Lewis Southworth, an early settler

Location
- Country: United States
- State: Oregon
- County: Lincoln

Physical characteristics
- Source: Burnt Timber Mountain
  - location: Siuslaw National Forest
  - coordinates: 44°22′16″N 123°59′32″W
  - elevation: 1,231 ft (375 m)
- Mouth: Alsea River
  - location: near Waldport
  - coordinates: 44°24′45″N 123°59′15″W
  - elevation: 7 ft (2.1 m)
- Length: 3 mi (4.8 km)

Southworth Creek is a stream, about 5 miles (8 km) long, in Lincoln County, in the U.S. state of Oregon. It is a tributary of the Alsea River, which it enters upstream of Waldport and the Pacific Ocean. It flows north from the slopes of Burnt Timber Mountain to join the larger stream at an elevation of just 7 feet (2.1 m) above sea level.

Southworth Creek was named for Lewis Southworth, a former slave who settled there in the 1880s. It was originally called Darkey Creek until the Oregon Geographic Names Board was asked to officially change the name.

== See also ==
- List of rivers of Oregon
