= Tidewater, Oregon =

Unincorporated community in the state of Oregon, United States

- Unincorporated community
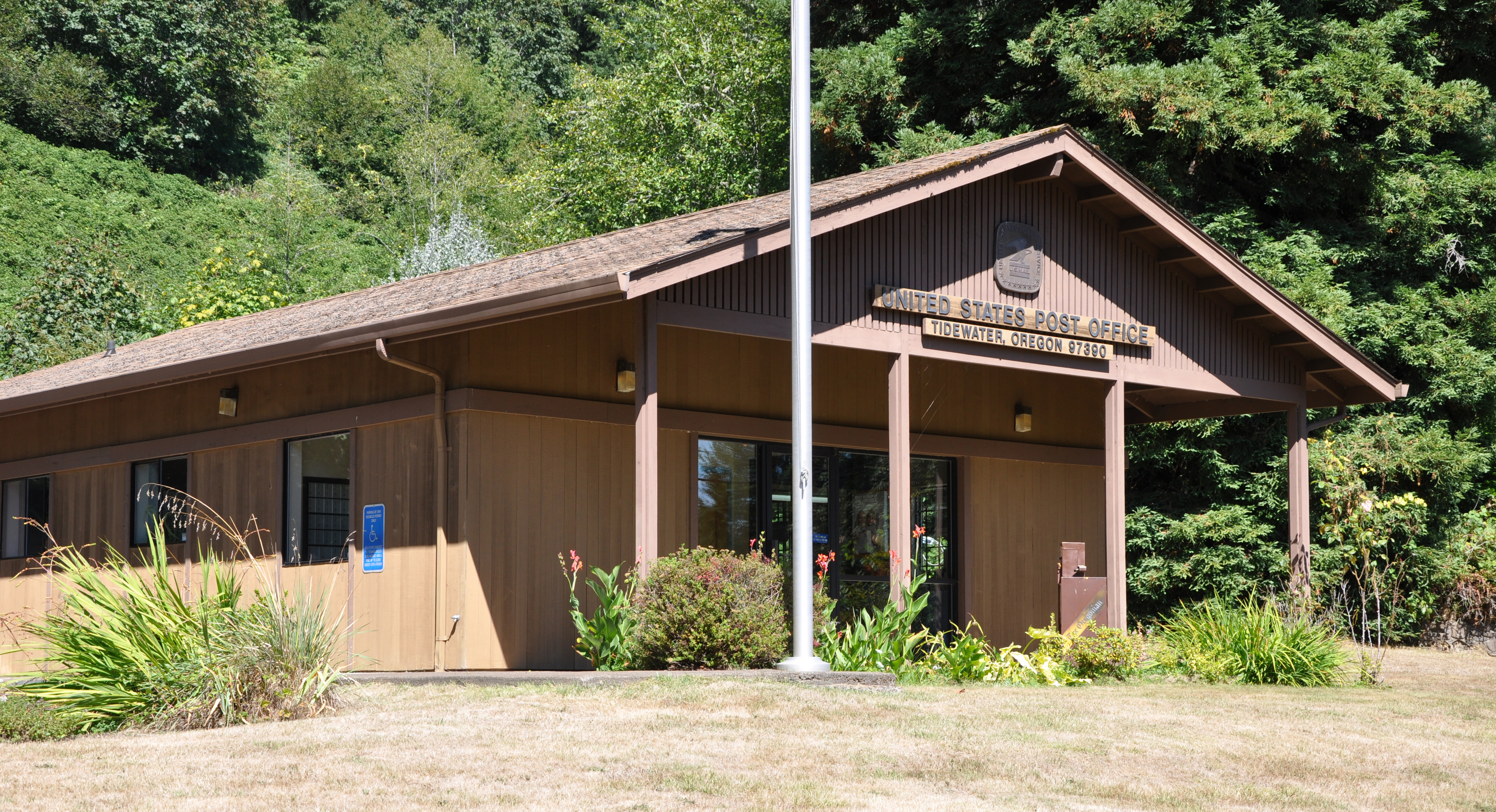
- Post office in Tidewater

- Location within Oregon Location within the United States
- Coordinates: 44°24′40″N 123°54′01″W
- Country: United States
- State: Oregon
- County: Lincoln
- Elevation: 75 ft (23 m)
- Time zone: UTC-8 (PST)
  - Summer (DST): UTC-7 (PDT)
- ZIP codes: 97390
- GNIS feature ID: 1151211

Tidewater is an unincorporated community in Lincoln County, Oregon, United States located on the Alsea River east of Waldport on Oregon Route 34.

Tidewater was named because it is near the head of the tide of the Alsea River. Tidewater post office was established in 1878.

Tidewater is the home of White Wolf Sanctuary, a rescue facility for Arctic wolves.

== Climate ==
This region experiences warm (but not hot) and dry summers, with no average monthly high temperatures in Tidewater above 76 °F (24 °C). According to the Köppen Climate Classification system, Tidewater has a warm-summer Mediterranean climate, abbreviated "Csb" on climate maps.

Climate data for Tidewater
Month	Jan	Feb	Mar	Apr	May	Jun	Jul	Aug	Sep	Oct	Nov	Dec	Year
Record high °F (°C)	68 (20)	80 (27)	81 (27)	92 (33)	95 (35)	100 (38)	106 (41)	106 (41)	100 (38)	93 (34)	80 (27)	67 (19)	106 (41)
Mean daily maximum °F (°C)	49.5 (9.7)	54.3 (12.4)	57 (14)	61 (16)	66.1 (18.9)	70 (21)	74.6 (23.7)	75.8 (24.3)	74.5 (23.6)	66.2 (19.0)	55.5 (13.1)	49.8 (9.9)	62.9 (17.2)
Mean daily minimum °F (°C)	36 (2)	38 (3)	38.5 (3.6)	40.6 (4.8)	44.4 (6.9)	48.6 (9.2)	51.8 (11.0)	52.1 (11.2)	49.7 (9.8)	45.7 (7.6)	40.6 (4.8)	37.4 (3.0)	43.6 (6.4)
Record low °F (°C)	8 (−13)	10 (−12)	23 (−5)	26 (−3)	30 (−1)	35 (2)	38 (3)	40 (4)	29 (−2)	25 (−4)	17 (−8)	5 (−15)	5 (−15)
Average precipitation inches (mm)	14.45 (367)	12.07 (307)	11 (280)	6.58 (167)	4.12 (105)	2.46 (62)	0.81 (21)	1.12 (28)	2.88 (73)	6.84 (174)	13.48 (342)	15.32 (389)	91.15 (2,315)
Average snowfall inches (cm)	1.3 (3.3)	0.7 (1.8)	0.1 (0.25)	0 (0)	0 (0)	0 (0)	0 (0)	0 (0)	0 (0)	0 (0)	0.1 (0.25)	0.4 (1.0)	2.5 (6.4)
Average precipitation days	20	18	19	16	13	9	4	4	8	13	20	21	165
