= Dr. Henry S. Pernot House =

Historic house in Oregon, United States

- U.S. National Register of Historic Places
- U.S. Historic district – Contributing property
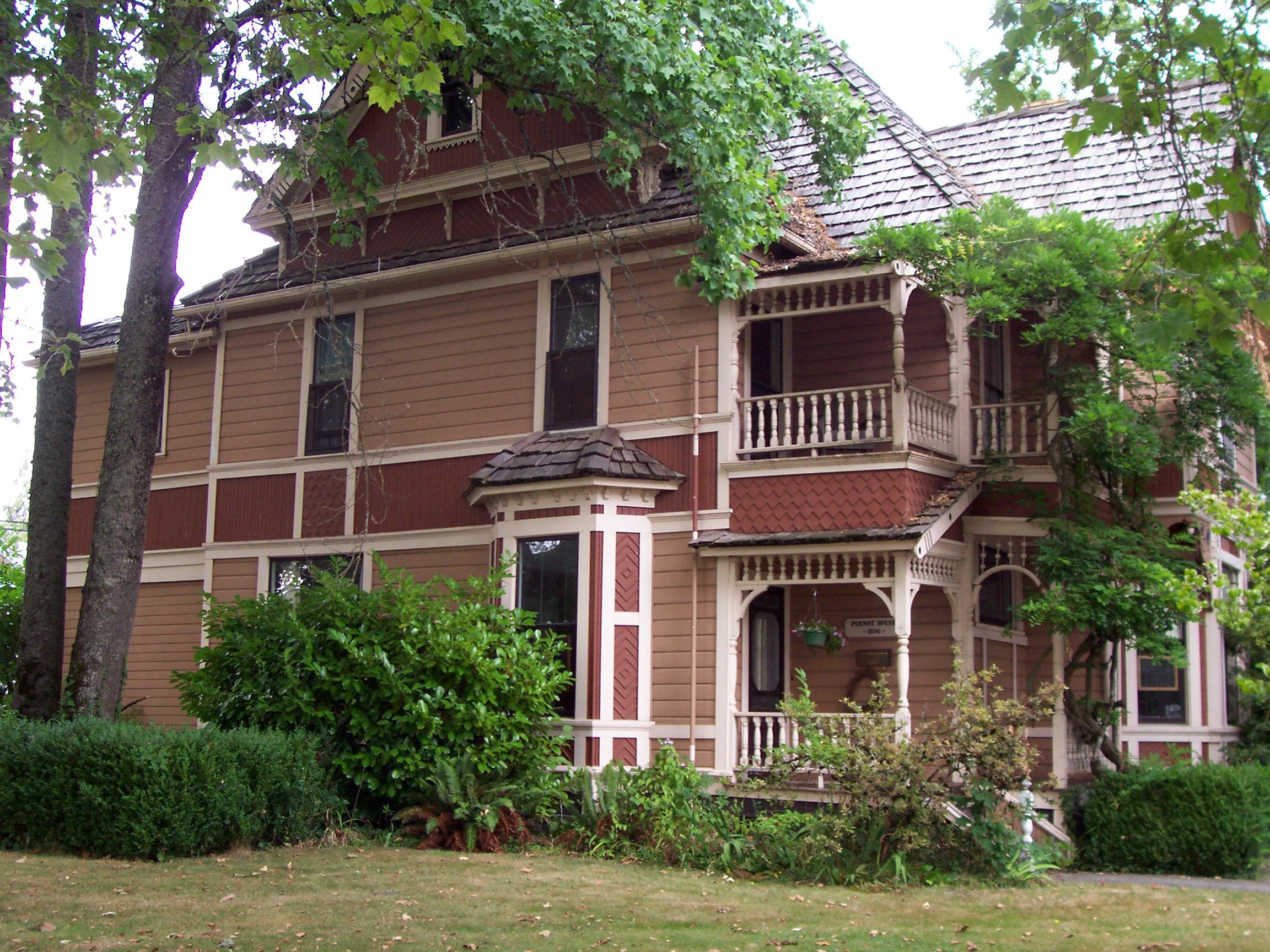
- The Pernot House in 2009

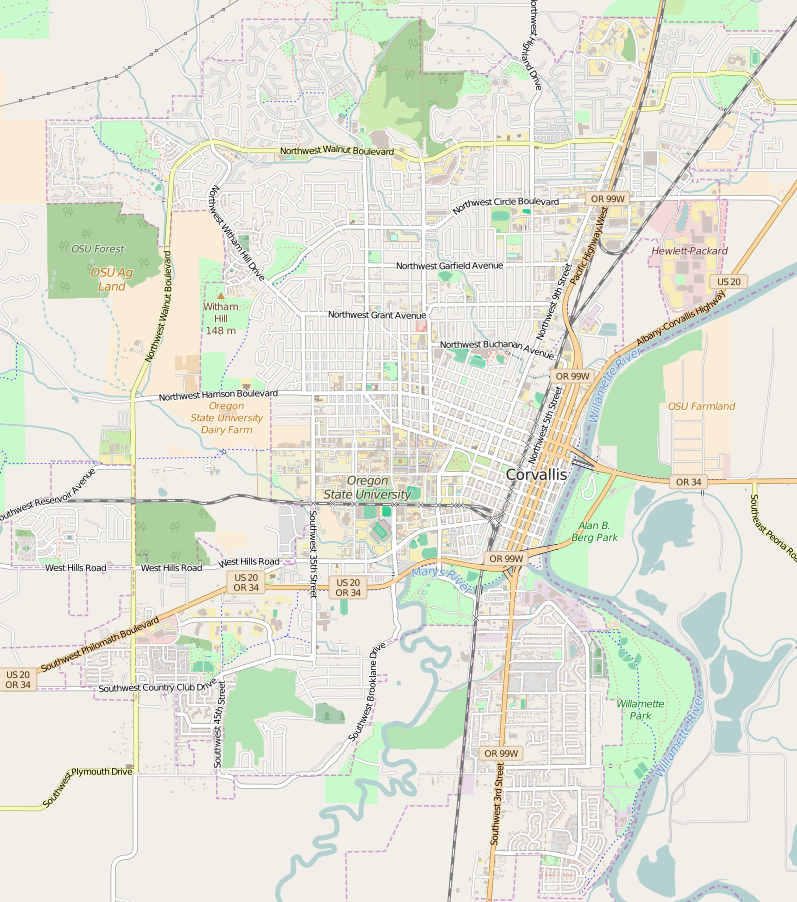
- Location within Corvallis OR Location within Oregon
- Location: 242 SW 5th Street; Corvallis, Oregon
- Coordinates: 44°33′48″N 123°15′51″W
- Area: Lot: 10,000 square feet (930 m^{2})
- Built: 1896
- Architectural style: Queen Anne, with Stick and Eastlake influences
- Part of: Avery–Helm Historic District (ID99001716)
- NRHP reference No.: 82003720
- Added to NRHP: April 29, 1982

The Dr. Henry S. Pernot House is a historic residence in Corvallis, Oregon, United States that is built in the Queen Anne style.

A one-car garage built in 1926 sits on the former site of the carriage house.

The house was listed on the National Register of Historic Places in 1982.

== See also ==
- National Register of Historic Places listings in Benton County, Oregon
- Avery-Helm Historic District
