= Cascade Falls (Lincoln County, Oregon) =

- Interactive map of Cascade Falls
- Location: Siuslaw National Forest
- Coordinates: 44.32056°N 123.84917°W
- Elevation: 171 ft (52 m)
- Total height: Unrated

Cascade Falls is a waterfall from the Cascade Creek, shortly before it empties in Alsea River, in Lincoln County, Oregon. Cascade Creek is known for being a point for fishing chinook salmon, bull trout, and steelhead trout.

== See also ==
- List of waterfalls
- List of waterfalls in Oregon
