= Fisher School Bridge =

Covered bridge in Oregon, US

- U.S. National Register of Historic Places
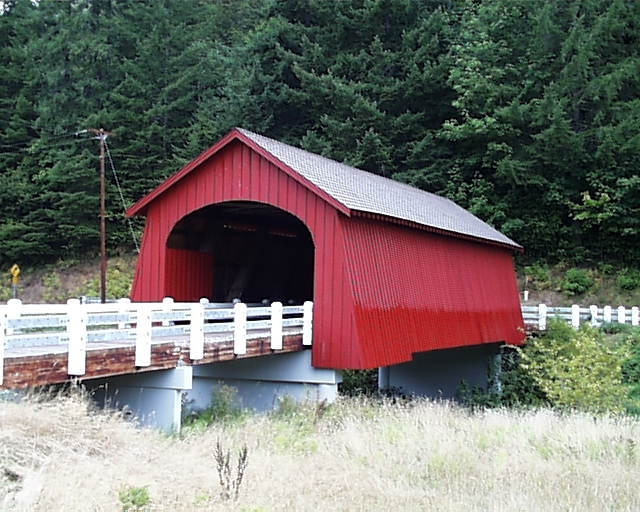
- Fisher School Bridge over Five Rivers

- Location within Oregon Location within the United States
- Coordinates: 44°17′29.8″N 123°50′28.3″W
- Built: 1919 (1927)
- Built by: Otis Hamer
- Architectural style: Howe truss
- MPS: Oregon Covered Bridges TR
- NRHP reference No.: 79002105
- Listed: November 29, 1979

The Fisher School Bridge is a covered bridge in Lincoln County in the U.S. state of Oregon. The 72-foot (22 m) Howe truss structure crosses a stream called Five Rivers near the rural community of Fisher in the Central Oregon Coast Range. Previously closed to vehicles, the bridge was renovated on a new foundation adjacent to the original position.

The bridge takes its name from Fisher Elementary School, now a private property just across Crab Creek Road. Alternatively, the bridge is sometimes called Five Rivers Bridge. It is the only remaining covered bridge in the Five Rivers basin. Former covered bridges within 2 miles (3 km) of Fisher were the Buck Creek Bridge (1924) and the Cascade Creek Bridge (1927), both 36 feet (11 m) long.

Conflicting county records give the date of construction as either 1919 or 1927, but the county's official date is 1919. Features include semi-elliptical portal arches, ribbon windows under the eaves, and flared side walls. The structure was added to the National Register of Historic Places in 1979.

Scheduled for demolition in the 1970s after replacement by a concrete bridge, the Fisher School Bridge was preserved by the local community with the aid of Lincoln County. In 1998, an inspection showed that the bridge had become unsafe and would need to be demolished or renovated. A federal grant obtained in 2001 with help from the Oregon Department of Transportation paid for most of the renovation, including new floor beams, deck, siding, roof, and other components, as well as red paint. More recently, cedar shingles and siding were restored to match the historic materials.

== See also ==
- List of bridges documented by the Historic American Engineering Record in Oregon
- List of bridges on the National Register of Historic Places in Oregon
- List of Oregon covered bridges
