= Van Buren Street Bridge =

Van Buren Street bridge
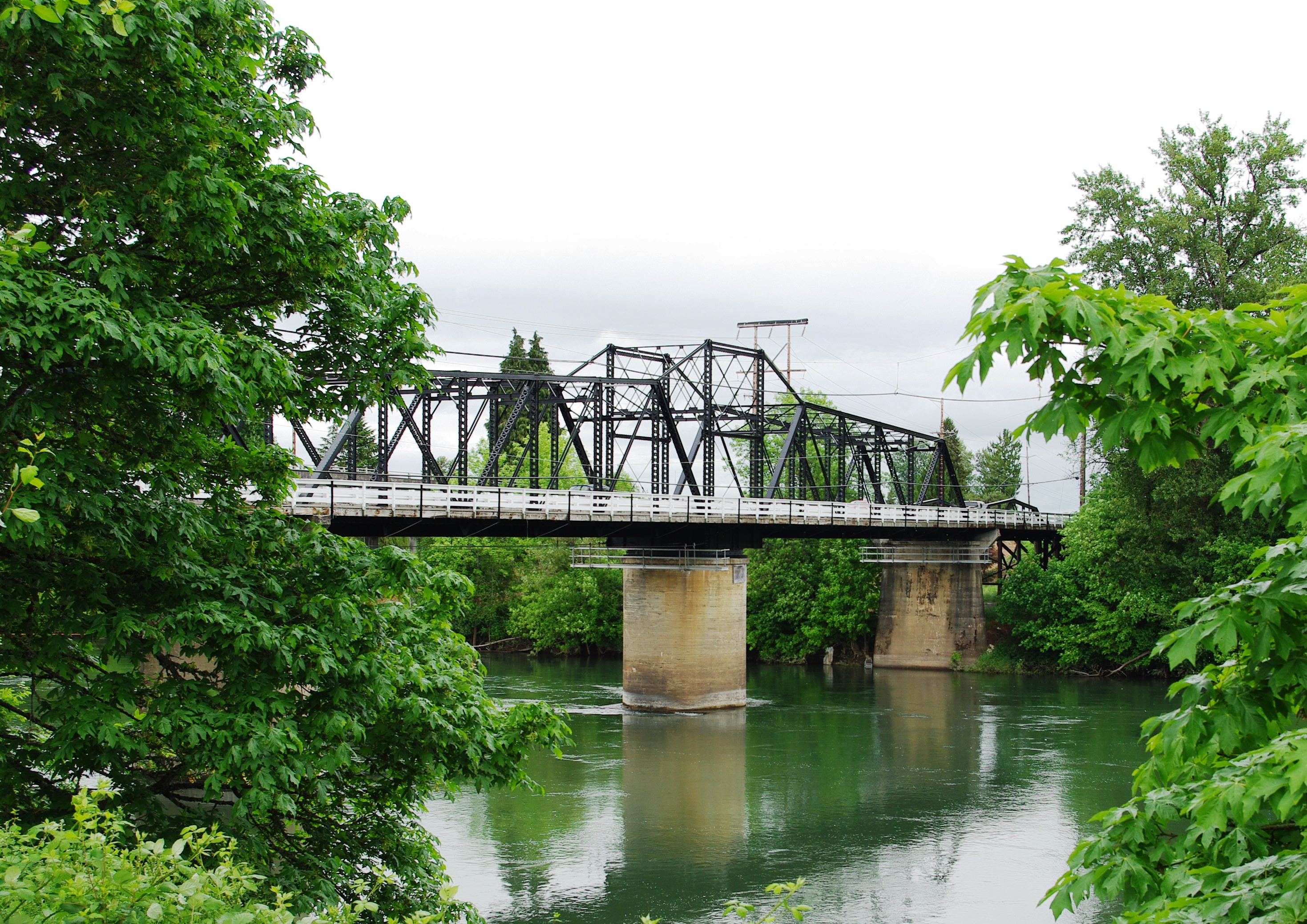
- Coordinates: 44.5654813°N 123.2565862°W
- Carries: OR 34 (Van Buren Street) eastbound
- Crosses: Willamette River
- Locale: Corvallis, Oregon
- Maintained by: Oregon Department of Transportation

Characteristics
- Design: Swing span
- Total length: 708 feet (216 m)
- Longest span: 249 feet (76 m)

History
- Opened: 1913

Location
- Interactive map of Van Buren Street bridge

The Van Buren Street Bridge was a swing span, steel motor vehicle bridge spanning the Willamette River at Corvallis in the U.S. state of Oregon. Opened in 1913, the black colored bridge was the first bridge across the river at Corvallis. Owned by the state and maintained by the Oregon Department of Transportation (ODOT), the 708-foot (216 m) long span was of a through truss design and carried one lane of traffic of Oregon Route 34 eastbound from Corvallis into neighboring Linn County.

A project to replace the bridge is underway and is scheduled to be completed in 2026. On January 26, 2024, ODOT announced the bridge had been removed.

== History ==
About 1860 a ferry started crossing the Willamette River at Corvallis. Benton County legislators were able to secure approval to build a bridge at the site as early as 1889. Meanwhile, the county bought the ferry in 1902 and removed the crossing fee. Plans for the bridge across the river were created by Benton County in 1910, and in February 1911 the Oregon Legislature passed a bill that approved the plan to build the bridge. The county signed a contract with the Coast Bridge Company for the steel for a bridge in January 1912.

Work began about June 1912 after a legal delay over funding was resolved, with Corvallis agreeing to pay a larger portion of the project. In November 1912, Corvallis residents passed a bond measure to allow for the city's portion of funding of the bridge. This vote was the first time women were allowed to vote in a Corvallis election. Construction was completed by the Coast Bridge Company on the project that would cost $70,000 to build. Andrew J. Porter was the designer of the span. Funds came from the city, Linn County, private donations, and the largest portion from Benton County. The span was completed in February 1913, with a dedication ceremony on March 11 attended by the mayors of Corvallis and Philomath, as well as the judges for Linn and Benton counties. Built as a vehicle crossing, the Oregon Electric Railway had tracks leading to the east side of the bridge shortly after the bridge opened.

The road across the span was originally two-way, plus there was a sidewalk along the south side. On January 25, 1914, the span unexpectedly opened during a windstorm, and trapped a young man on the open swing span section until the bridge operators could row out to the center span and use the turn-key to put the span back into proper position. The state took over ownership of the span in 1938. In June 1952, the span was opened for the first time in 25 years to allow an Army Corps of Engineers vessel to pass, and the span opened for the final time in October 1960. In the 1980s the swivel became inoperable. The bridge was nominated for listing on the National Register of Historic Places about 2006. In March 2007, planned maintenance and re-painting began on the bridge, closing the bridge to traffic at times. The $2.5 million project was completed in October 2007.

=== Replacement plans ===
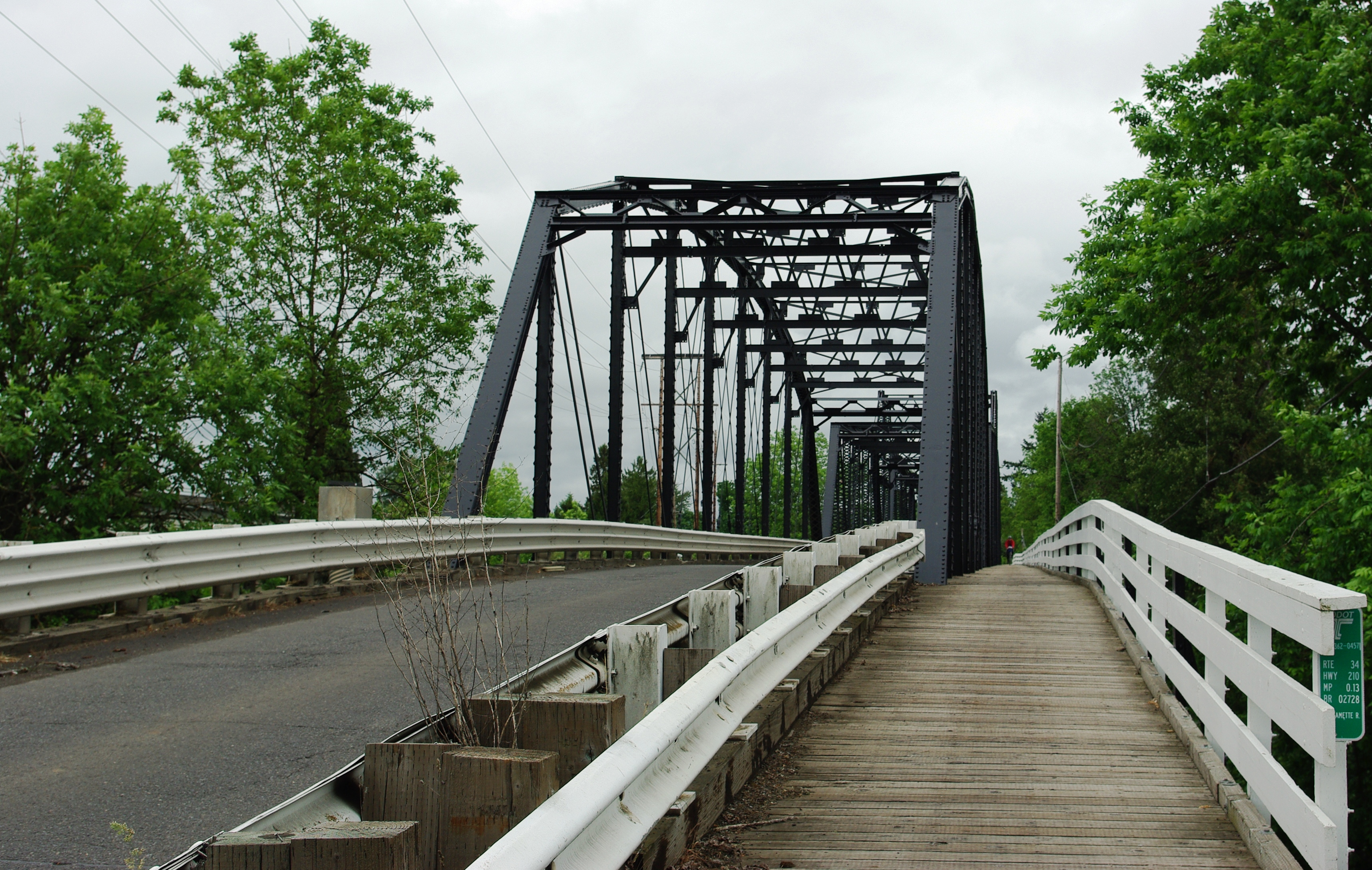
Entrance to the bridge from the west

In the 1990s the Oregon Department of Transportation proposed options for replacing the bridge in order to alleviate traffic problems in downtown Corvallis. Funding was never secured and the project was dropped in 1993, but the plans were revived in 2004. Plans included options to move the existing structure to a park, leave it in place, and build a new span that could be located in a variety of locations along the river in downtown. These options were narrowed to two in 2006, one adding a bridge parallel to the existing bridge and the other building a curved bridge between the old span and the Harrison Street Bridge. The existing structure would have remained in-place under both options, and costs were estimated at $18 million.

If a new bridge were built, the state originally said they would no longer own and maintain the old bridge, which was proposed to be used for pedestrians and bicycles. Linn County's Board of Commissioners supported tearing down the old bridge and simply replace it with a new wider span. In June 2006, ODOT decided to keep the existing span in addition to the new bridge. Additional studies began in 2007 to determine which of the options for replacement would work best for fixing traffic issues across the river. Options now included adding a bypass north to connect with Oregon Route 99W. By May 2009, ODOT had two proposals, one of which would not build a new bridge near the existing span. Both options included adding a northern bypass that would connect to U.S. Route 20 and Oregon 99W.

As of 2015 the plans for a new bridge had been set aside, with improvements to the south bypass and downtown exits for OR 34, OR 20, and 99 W intended to ease congestion instead. The future northern bypass is considered by planners to be a long-term goal, as there is no schedule and none of the estimated $250 million cost has been budgeted.

In 2017, plans to replace the bridge resumed with the passage of House Bill 2017. Construction began in May 2023 and the replacement bridge is scheduled to be completed in 2026.

== Details ==
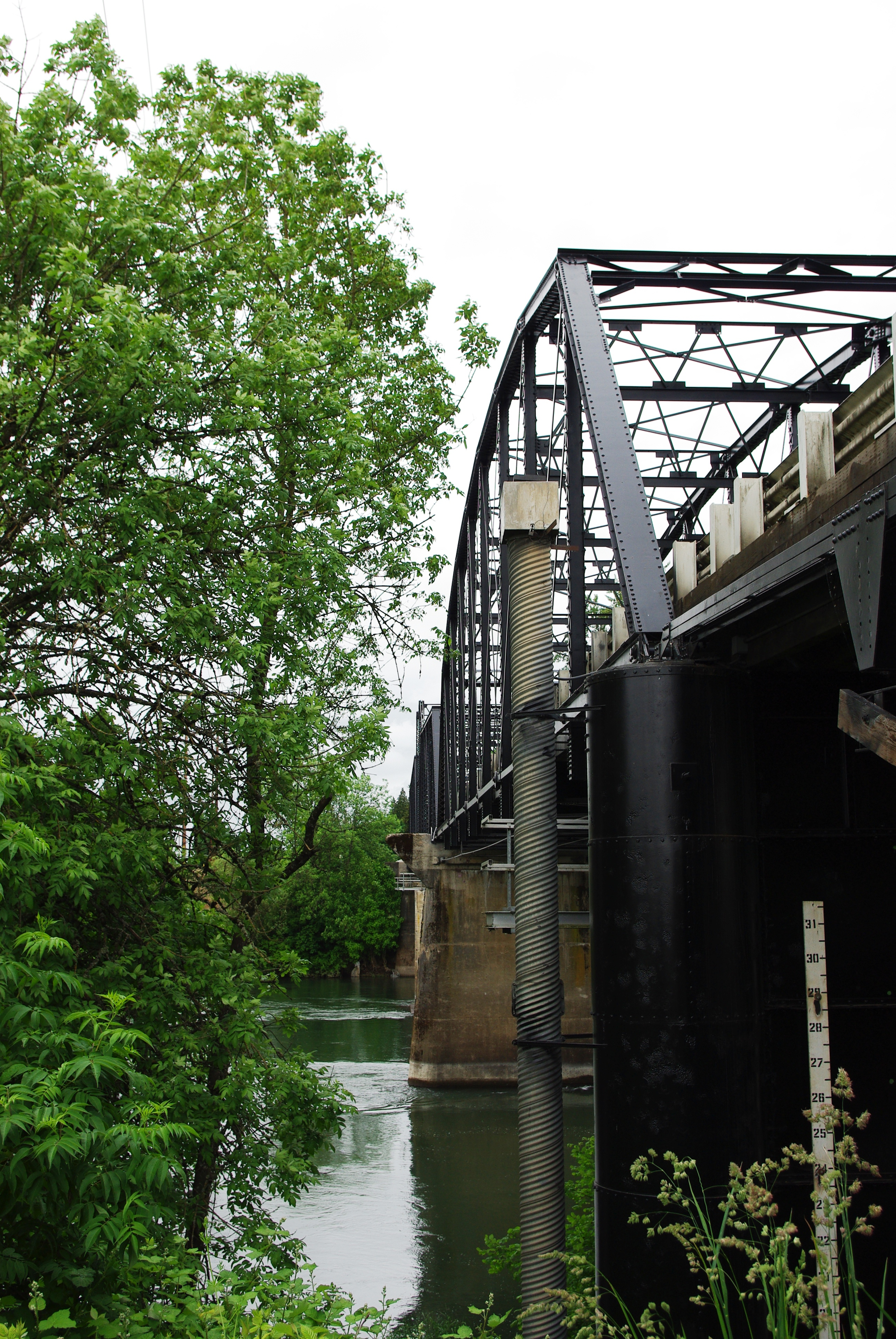
Western side of the bridge

The bridge was the first bridge across the Willamette River at Corvallis. Carrying one lane of traffic eastbound, it connected Benton County on the west to Linn County on the east side of the Willamette. It carried Oregon Route 34 out of downtown Corvallis, with the Harrison Street Bridge to the north carrying OR 34 into downtown. The single lane created traffic problems at the evening rush hour with three lanes of the highway narrowing to one lane to cross the bridge.

A swing bridge, its main 249-foot (76 m)-span could swivel on its axis and open to allow river traffic to pass. This was accomplished by using a turn key placed into the turning bolt and rotating the bolt. Six people would rotate the key using a 17-foot (5.2 m) long wood rod that combined resemble a corkscrew. This would turn the 24-foot (7.3 m) wide gear that had 300 teeth along its circumference and the span would spin along 42 rollers constructed of steel. The operators could use two gears, one opened the span in 150 revolutions, while the other completed the job in 50 revolutions. When opened it provided 102 feet (31 m) of clearance on either side of the bridge.

Van Buren Street Bridge was the last movable-span truss bridge constructed by the pin connection method located on the West Coast. Pins were used to connect the trusses, but the technique was abandoned after rivets came into usage. The bridge was also one of only two swing style bridges left in Oregon used for vehicle traffic, and was the third oldest bridge across the Willamette after the Steel and Hawthorne bridges in Portland.

Overall, the bridge was 708 feet (216 m) long and was composed of three separate steel spans that rested on concrete piers. The swing span was a Pratt through truss, and the next longest part a 171-foot (52 m) long Parker through truss span on the western end. The eastern approach was a Warren pony truss that measured 57 feet (17 m) in length. There was also a 19-foot (5.8 m) long part on the far west end built of timber, which was originally a 57-foot (17 m) long steel pony truss. The bridge had 15 feet (4.6 m) of vertical clearance and was 29 feet (8.8 m) wide, which included a 7-foot (2.1 m) sidewalk and a 18.5-foot (5.6 m) roadway.

== See also ==
- List of crossings of the Willamette River
