= Five Rivers (Oregon) =

River in Oregon, United States

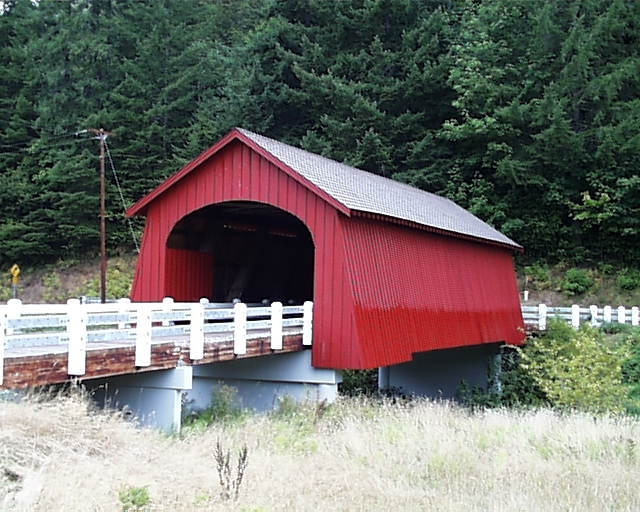
- Fisher School Bridge crosses Five Rivers at Fisher

- Location of the mouth of Five Rivers in Oregon
- Etymology: For five of the stream's tributaries

Location
- Country: United States
- State: Oregon
- Counties: Lincoln, Benton, Lane

Physical characteristics
- Source: Central Oregon Coast Range
  - location: Siuslaw National Forest
  - coordinates: 44°11′55″N 123°48′33″W
  - elevation: 1,510 ft (460 m)
- Mouth: Alsea River
  - location: near Stoney Mountain
  - coordinates: 44°21′30″N 123°49′37″W
  - elevation: 85 ft (26 m)
- Basin size: 119 sq mi (310 km^{2})

Five Rivers is a tributary of the Alsea River in the U.S. state of Oregon, in Lane, Lincoln, Benton counties. The name Five Rivers refers to the relative importance to the stream of five of its tributaries: Alder, Cougar, Buck, Crab, and Cherry creeks.

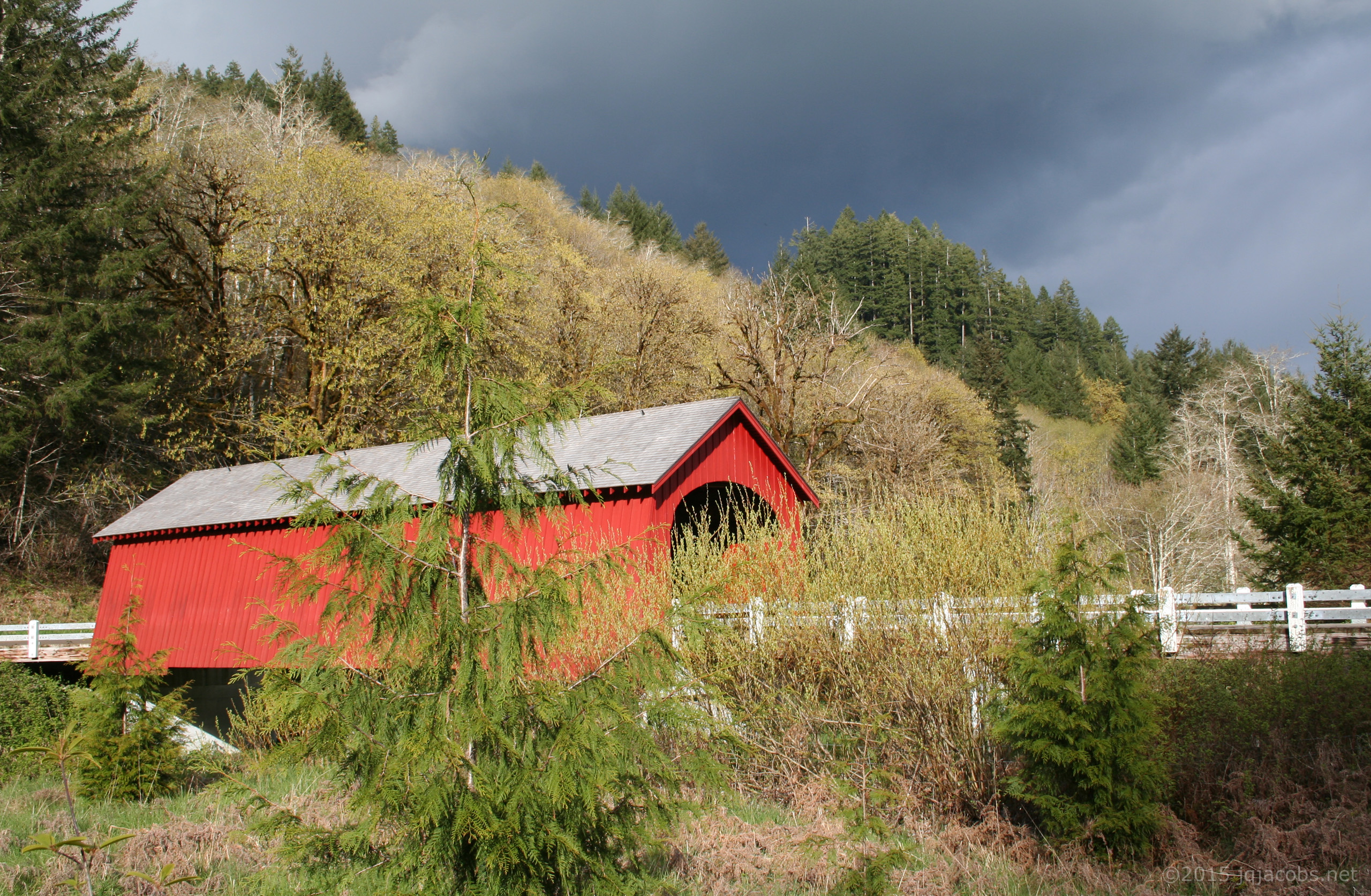
Fisher Covered Bridge spans Five Rivers in southern Lincoln county, Oregon.

== Geography ==
Five Rivers meanders generally north through the Siuslaw National Forest from its headwaters in the Central Oregon Coast Range west of Blachly in Lane County. It enters the Alsea River near Stoney Mountain, 25 miles (40 km) from the Alsea's mouth on the Pacific Ocean at Waldport.

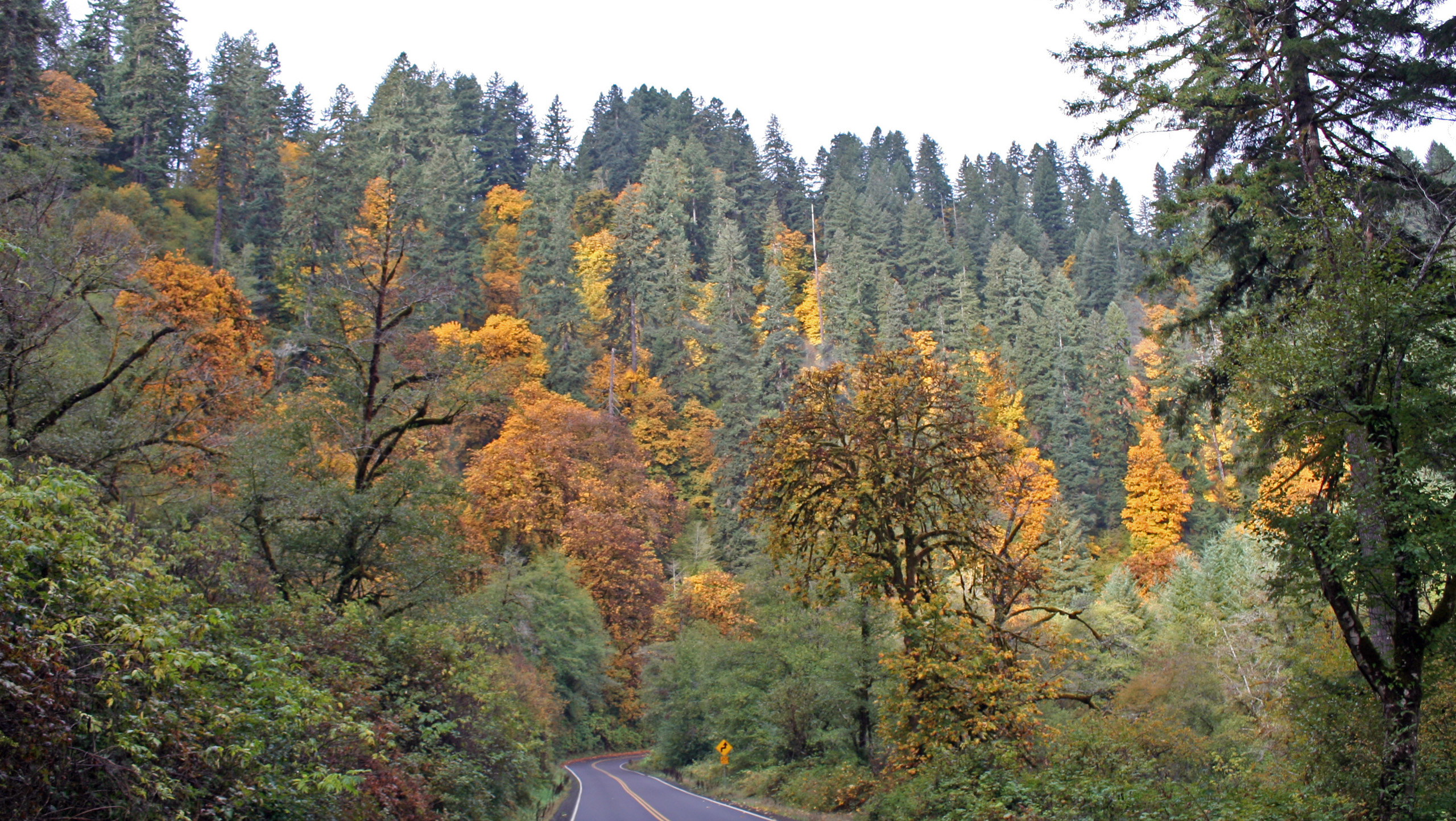
View of Siuslaw National Forest from Five Rivers Road.

The rural community of Paris lies 17 miles (27 km) by river from the mouth of Five Rivers. About 7 miles (11 km) further downstream is another rural community, Fisher, near the confluence of Five Rivers with Crab Creek. Fisher School Bridge, a one-way covered bridge, crosses Five Rivers at Fisher.

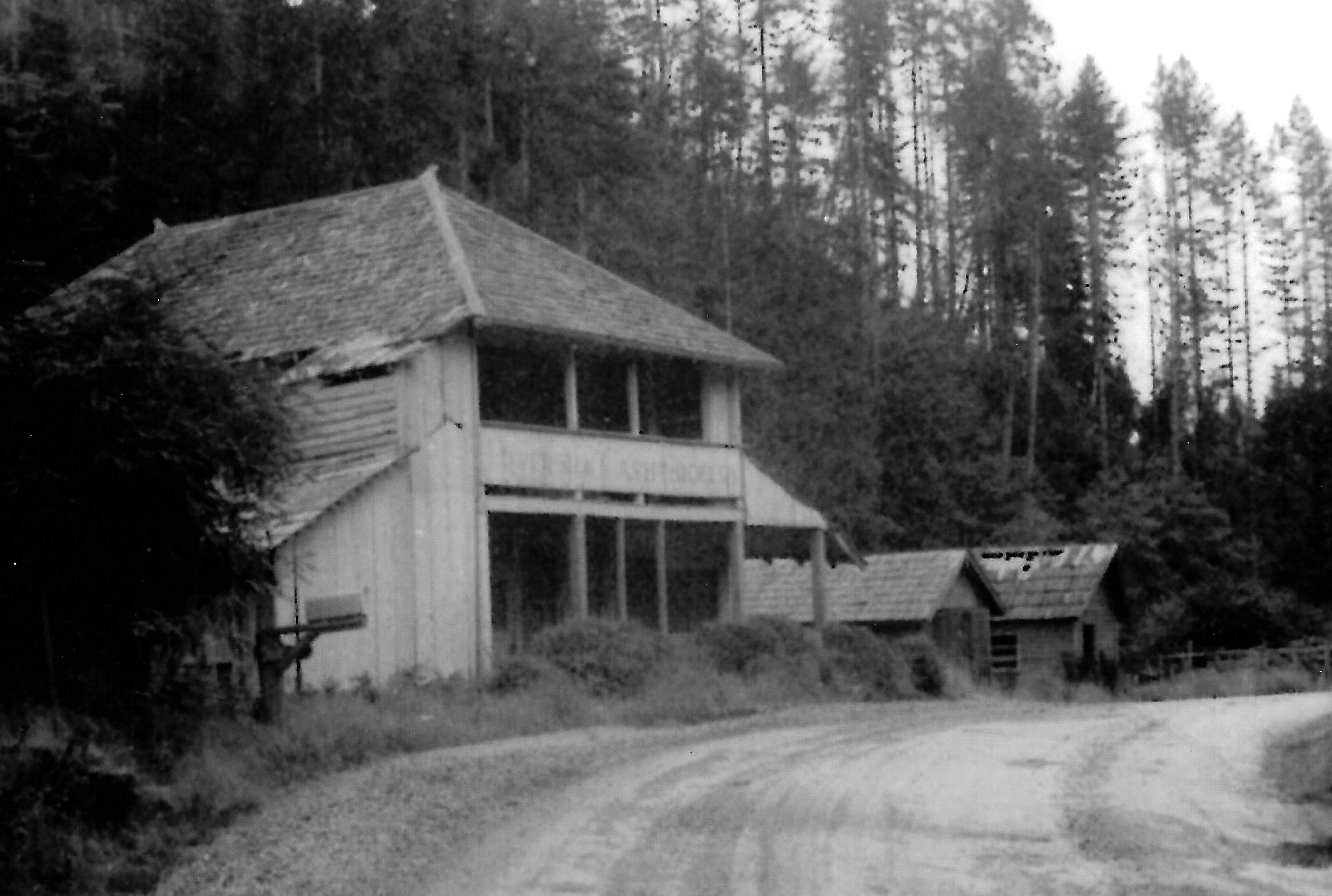
Historic mercantile building in Fisher contained the post office.

== Recreation ==
Five Rivers Launch is a day-use area near the Five Rivers – Alsea confluence and the intersection of Five Rivers Road with Oregon Route 34, which runs along the Alsea. Managed by Lincoln County, the launch includes a gravel boat ramp and a parking area. The launch is only for drift boats such as canoes and kayaks.

== Tributaries ==
Named tributaries of Five Rivers from source to mouth are Prindel, Lord, Summers, Cedar, and Fendall creeks followed by Green River. Then come Crazy, Alder, Cougar, Crab, Buck, and Cherry creeks. Below that are Cascade, Swamp, Lobster, Elk, and Bear creeks.

== See also ==
- List of rivers of Oregon
