= Alsea Falls =

Waterfall in Benton County, Oregon, U.S.

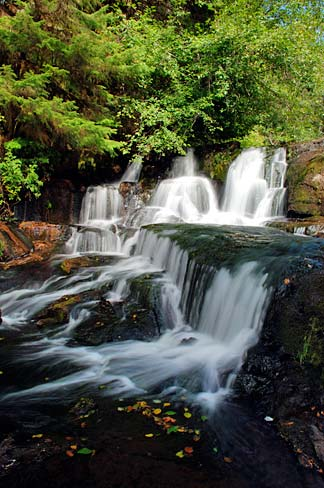
- Interactive map of Alsea Falls
- Location: South Fork Alsea River
- Coordinates: 44.3264157°N 123.4918481°W
- Type: Staircase
- Elevation: 781 ft (238 m)
- Total height: 30 ft (9.1 m)
- Average flow rate: 25 cu ft/s (0.71 m^{3}/s)

Alsea Falls is a waterfall located in the Central Oregon Coast Range, 13 miles west of Monroe, in Benton County, in the U.S. state of Oregon. It is 30 feet fall and is part of the Alsea Falls trailhead and Recreation Site.

== Location ==
Alsea Falls is located along a Bureau of Land Management Back Country Byway surrounded by Oldgrowth Douglas fir and western redcedar forests. The waters of the Alsea Falls are located downstream of the South Fork Alsea River.

== History ==
The name of the waterfall and the river the forms it may have stemmed from Alsi, said to be a corruption of Alsea for native people who lived near the mouth of the river.

== See also ==
- List of waterfalls
- List of waterfalls in Oregon
