= Tangent, Oregon =

- City
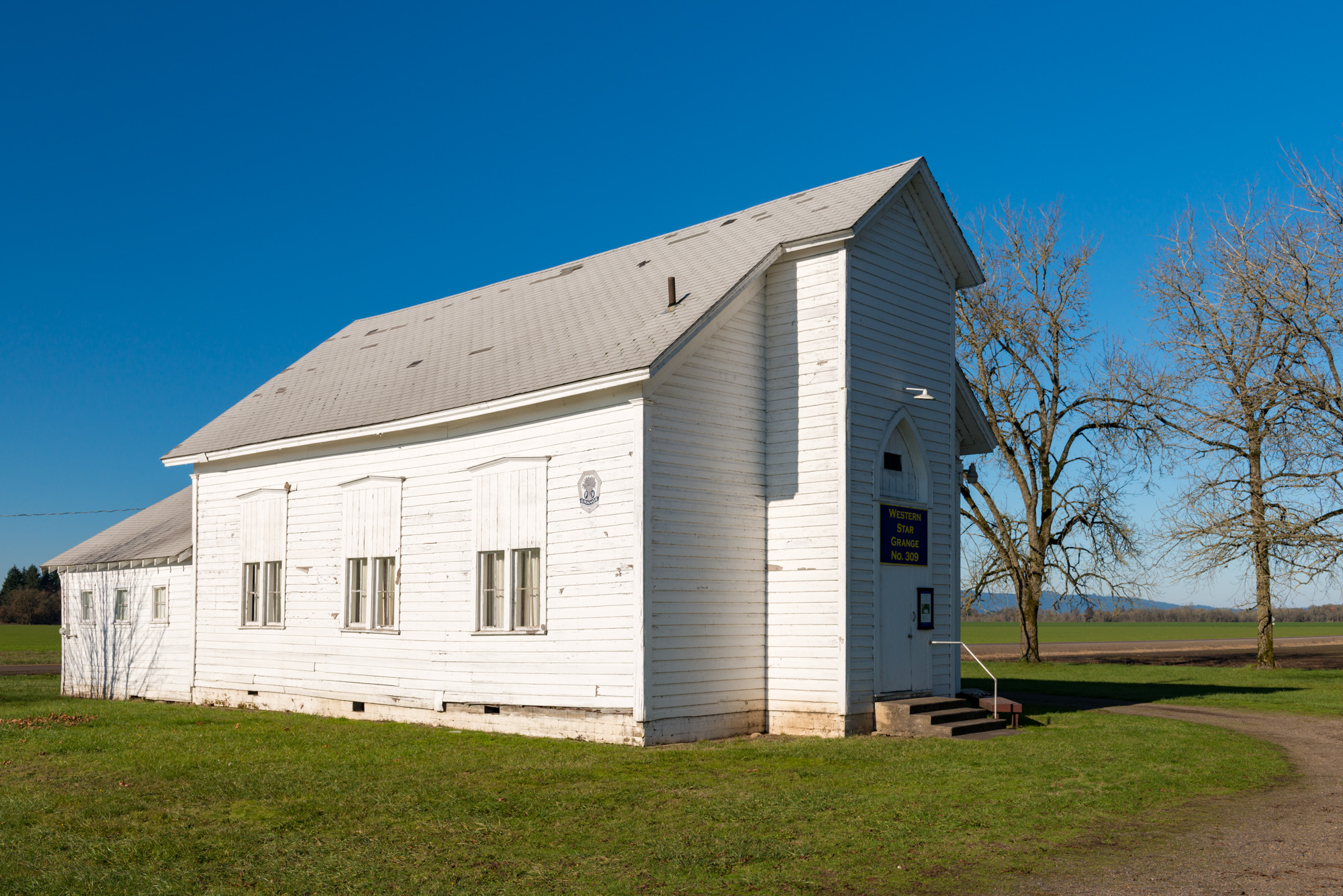
- Western Star Grange #309 on Tangent Drive.
- Nickname: Grass Seed Capital of the World
- Location in Oregon
- Coordinates: 44°32′53″N 123°06′40″W
- Country: United States
- State: Oregon
- County: Linn
- Incorporated: 1893

Government
  - Mayor: Loel Trulove Jr.

Area
  - Total: 3.79 sq mi (9.82 km^{2})
  - Land: 3.79 sq mi (9.82 km^{2})
  - Water: 0 sq mi (0.00 km^{2})
- Elevation: 246 ft (75 m)

Population (2020)
  - Total: 1,231
  - Density: 324.8/sq mi (125.41/km^{2})
- Time zone: UTC-8 (Pacific)
  - Summer (DST): UTC-7 (Pacific)
- ZIP code: 97389
- Area code: 541
- FIPS code: 41-72600
- GNIS feature ID: 2412033
- Website: www.tangentor.gov

Tangent is a city in Linn County, Oregon, United States. The population was 1,231 at the 2020 census.

Tangent was the site of a railway station on the Southern Pacific line south of Albany. Its name referred to a straight stretch of the line with no curves for more than 20 miles (32 km). The federal government established a post office in Tangent on September 17, 1872.

== Geography ==
According to the United States Census Bureau, the city has a total area of 3.78 square miles (9.79 km^{2}), all land.

=== Climate ===
This region experiences warm (but not hot) and dry summers, with no average monthly temperatures above 71.6 °F (22.0 °C). According to the Köppen Climate Classification system, Tangent has a warm-summer Mediterranean climate, abbreviated "Csb" on climate maps.

== Demographics ==
Historical population
Census	Pop.	Note	%±
1880	38		—
1900	84		—
1980	478		—
1990	556		16.3%
2000	933		67.8%
2010	1,164		24.8%
2020	1,231		5.8%
U.S. Decennial Census

=== 2020 census ===
As of the 2020 census, Tangent had a population of 1,231 people and 446 households. The median age was 40.0 years overall, 38.3 for males and 42.7 for females; 21.5% of residents were under the age of 18, and 15.8% were 65 years of age or older. For every 100 females there were 105.5 males, and for every 100 females age 18 and over there were 100.8 males age 18 and over.

92.7% of residents lived in urban areas, while 7.3% lived in rural areas.

There were 446 households, of which 30.5% had children under the age of 18 living in them. Of all households, 52.7% were married-couple households, 17.5% were households with a male householder and no spouse or partner present, 21.7% were households with a female householder and no spouse or partner present, 20.8% were made up of individuals, and 8.3% had someone living alone who was 65 years of age or older.

There were 463 housing units, of which 3.7% were vacant. Among occupied housing units, 74.7% were owner-occupied and 25.3% were renter-occupied. The homeowner vacancy rate was 1.2% and the rental vacancy rate was 4.2%.

Racial composition as of the 2020 census
Race	Number	Percent
White	1,057	85.9%
Black or African American	5	0.4%
American Indian and Alaska Native	14	1.1%
Asian	7	0.6%
Native Hawaiian and Other Pacific Islander	0	0%
Some other race	33	2.7%
Two or more races	115	9.3%
Hispanic or Latino (of any race)	142	11.5%

=== 2010 census ===
As of the census of 2010, there were 1,164 people, 410 households, and 315 families living in the city. The population density was 307.9 inhabitants per square mile (118.9/km^{2}). There were 433 housing units at an average density of 114.6 per square mile (44.2/km^{2}). The racial makeup of the city was 89.4% White, 0.2% African American, 0.8% Native American, 0.3% Asian, 0.2% Pacific Islander, 4.6% from other races, and 4.5% from two or more races. Hispanic or Latino of any race were 8.4% of the population.

There were 410 households, of which 39.0% had children under the age of 18 living with them, 58.3% were married couples living together, 13.4% had a female householder with no husband present, 5.1% had a male householder with no wife present, and 23.2% were non-families. 16.8% of all households were made up of individuals, and 5.2% had someone living alone who was 65 years of age or older. The average household size was 2.83 and the average family size was 3.17.

The median age in the city was 36.7 years. 29.2% of residents were under the age of 18; 7.4% were between the ages of 18 and 24; 24.5% were from 25 to 44; 26% were from 45 to 64; and 12.8% were 65 years of age or older. The gender makeup of the city was 49.4% male and 50.6% female.

=== 2000 census ===
As of the census of 2000, there were 933 people, 339 households, and 262 families living in the city. The population density was 246.9 inhabitants per square mile (95.3/km^{2}). There were 366 housing units at an average density of 96.9 per square mile (37.4/km^{2}). The racial makeup of the city was 95.71% White, 1.07% Native American, 0.32% Pacific Islander, 1.29% from other races, and 1.61% from two or more races. Hispanic or Latino of any race were 2.79% of the population.

There were 339 households, out of which 35.4% had children under the age of 18 living with them, 66.1% were married couples living together, 7.4% had a female householder with no husband present, and 22.7% were non-families. 17.1% of all households were made up of individuals, and 6.8% had someone living alone who was 65 years of age or older. The average household size was 2.75 and the average family size was 3.08.

In the city, the population was spread out, with 27.9% under the age of 18, 5.9% from 18 to 24, 32.7% from 25 to 44, 22.8% from 45 to 64, and 10.7% who were 65 years of age or older. The median age was 37 years. For every 100 females, there were 97.3 males. For every 100 females age 18 and over, there were 96.8 males.

The median income for a household in the city was $44,231, and the median income for a family was $50,450. Males had a median income of $36,458 versus $21,250 for females. The per capita income for the city was $17,012. About 5.2% of families and 6.4% of the population were below the poverty line, including 9.0% of those under age 18 and 2.0% of those age 65 or over.
