= Oregon Route 34 =

State highway in western Oregon, US

Oregon Route 34
- Route 34 highlighted in red

Route information
- Maintained by ODOT
- Length: 81.40 mi (131.00 km)
- Component highways: Alsea Highway No. 27; Corvallis–Newport Highway No. 33; Corvallis–Lebanon Highway No. 210
- Tourist routes: Marys Peak to Pacific Scenic Byway

Major junctions
- West end: US 101 in Waldport
- US 20 in Flynn; US 20 / OR 99W in Corvallis; OR 99E in Tangent; I-5 near Tangent
- East end: US 20 in Lebanon

Location
- Country: United States
- State: Oregon
- Counties: Lincoln, Benton, Linn

Highway system
- Oregon Highways; Interstate; US; State; Named; Scenic
← OR 31	→ OR 35

Oregon Route 34 is a state highway in the U.S. state of Oregon that runs between the city of Waldport on the Oregon Coast and the city of Lebanon in the western part of the state. OR 34 traverses the Alsea Highway No. 27 from Waldport to Flynn, part of the Corvallis–Newport Highway No. 33 from Flynn to east of Corvallis, and the Corvallis–Lebanon Highway No. 210 from east of Corvallis to Lebanon, of the Oregon state highway system. In Corvallis, OR 34 includes a brief concurrency with U.S. Route 20 and OR 99W over the Pacific Highway West No. 1W. Marys Peak to Pacific Scenic Byway follows OR 34.

== Route description ==
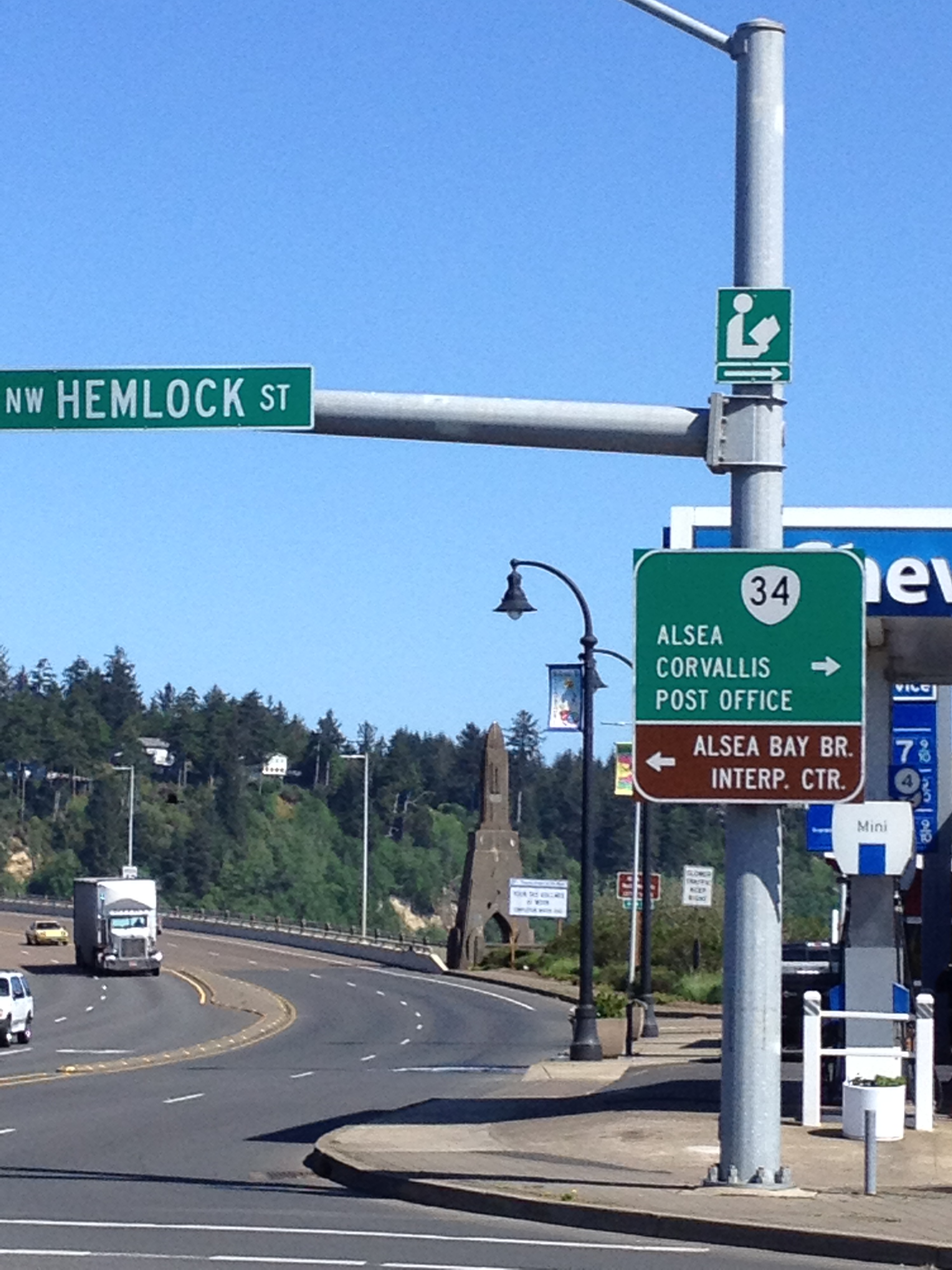
Western terminus of OR 34 in Waldport.

Oregon Route 34 begins (at its western terminus) at its junction with U.S. Route 101 in Waldport. It follows the Alsea River through Tidewater to the community of Alsea, where it heads northeast to its junction with U.S. Route 20 near Philomath. OR 34 and US 20 share the same roadway between Philomath and the college town of Corvallis. At a grade-separated interchange in eastern Corvallis, OR 34 leaves U.S. 20 (which heads north with Oregon Route 99W) and crosses the Willamette River into Linn County. From Corvallis to its junction with Interstate 5 east of Tangent, OR 34 is a four-lane undivided highway, with an interchange at its junction with Oregon Route 99E in Tangent. OR 34 continues east to its eastern terminus at U.S. 20 in Lebanon.

== Major intersections ==
Milepoints are as reported by ODOT and do not necessarily reflect current mileage. Z indicates overlapping mileage due to construction longer than established route, and – indicates negative mileage behind established beginning point. Segments that are locally maintained may be omitted. For routes traversing multiple named state highways, each milepoint is preceded by the corresponding state highway number.

County	Location	Milepoint	Destinations	Notes
Lincoln	Waldport	27 0.00	US 101 – Yachats, Florence, Seal Rock, Newport	
Lincoln		27 7.06	Alsea River	
Benton	Alsea	27 39.81	Alsea–Deadwood Highway (OR 501) – Alsea Falls, Lobster Valley, Grange Hall	
Benton		27 43.03	North Fork Alsea River	
Benton		27 47.77	Summit, elevation 1,230 feet (370 m)	
Benton	Flynn	27 58.56 33 49.73	US 20 west – Toledo, Newport	Western end of concurrency with US 20
Benton	Corvallis	33 55.65– 33 55.67	US 20 east / OR 99W north – Downtown Corvallis	Interchange; eastern end of concurrency with US 20; eastbound exit and westbound entrance
Benton	Corvallis	33 56.14– 33 56.15	OR 99W south – Junction City, Eugene, South Corvallis	Interchange; westbound exit and eastbound entrance
Willamette River		33 56.15	Benton–Linn county line	
Linn		33 56.80 210 0.34	To US 20 east / OR 99W south – Corvallis City Center	
Linn		210 5.51	Calapooia River	
Linn	Tangent	210 7.65	OR 99E – Albany, Junction City	Interchange
Linn		210 9.94– 210 10.12	I-5 – Eugene, Salem	Exit 228 on I-5
Linn	Lebanon	210 18.13	US 20 – Albany, Sweet Home	
1.000 mi = 1.609 km; 1.000 km = 0.621 mi: Concurrency terminus; Incomplete access

== See also ==
- Van Buren Street Bridge
