= Alsea, Oregon =

Unincorporated community in the state of Oregon, United States

- Unincorporated community & census-designated place
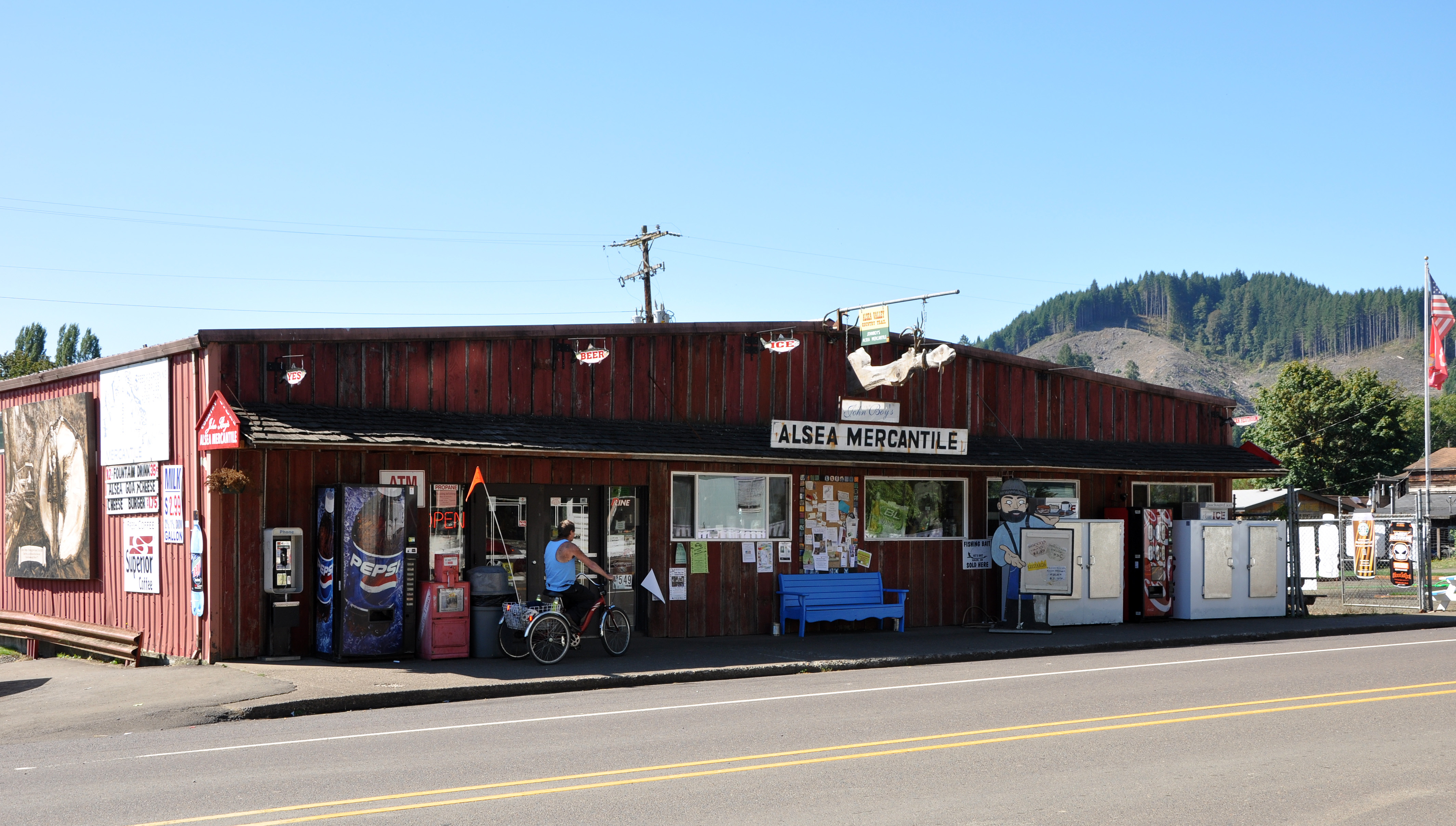
- Alsea Mercantile

- Location within the state of Oregon Alsea, Oregon (the United States)
- Coordinates: 44°22′53″N 123°35′47″W
- Country: United States
- State: Oregon
- County: Benton
- Named for: Alsea River

Area
  - Total: 0.15 sq mi (0.40 km^{2})
  - Land: 0.15 sq mi (0.40 km^{2})
  - Water: 0 sq mi (0.00 km^{2})
- Elevation: 295 ft (90 m)

Population (2020)
  - Total: 220
  - Estimate (2023): 220
  - Density: 1,056.6/sq mi (407.95/km^{2})
- Time zone: UTC-8 (PST)
  - Summer (DST): UTC-7 (PDT)
- ZIP codes: 97324
- Area code: 541
- FIPS code: 41-01800
- GNIS feature ID: 1137169

Alsea (/ˈælsi/ AL-see) is an unincorporated community in Benton County, in the U.S. state of Oregon. It is on Oregon Route 34 and the Alsea River. For statistical purposes, the United States Census Bureau has defined Alsea as a census-designated place (CDP). The census definition of the area may not precisely correspond to the local understanding of the area with the same name. As of the 2023 Census population estimates, the population was 220.

== History ==
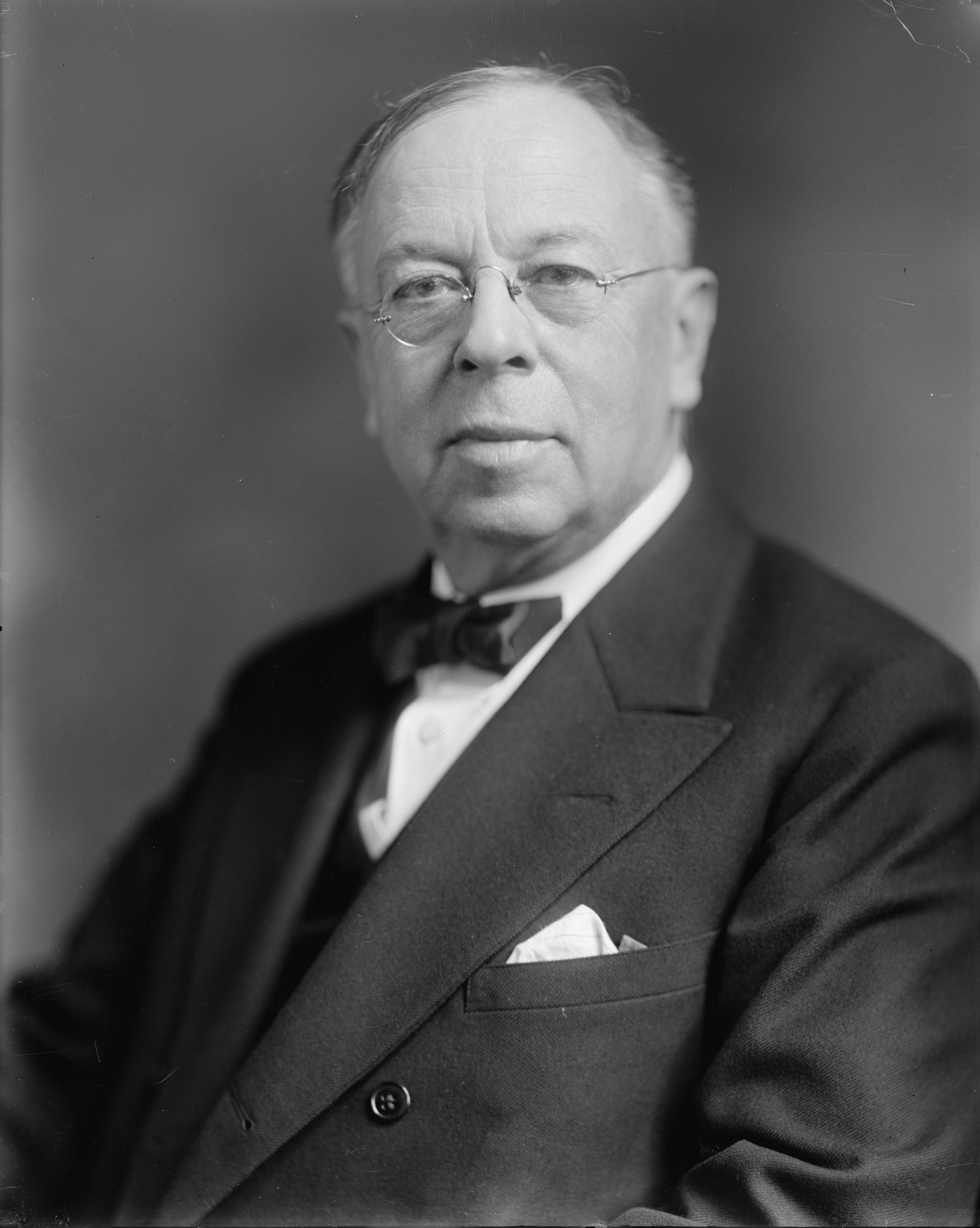
George Chamberlain, the 11th Governor of Oregon

Alsea was named for the Alsea River, whose name was a corruption of "Alsi" (also spelled "Ulseah" and "Alsiias") the name of a Native American tribe, now known as the Alsea, that lived at the mouth of the river. The Alsea area was settled by Europeans early as 1855, when the name "Alseya Settlement" appeared on the Surveyor general's map. Alsea post office was established in 1871.

In the early 1850s settlers moved from the Willamette Valley into the Alsea area to take up donation land claims. While logging was once the primary industry in Alsea, it is now known as a place for fishing on the Alsea River, particularly for steelhead, and a favorite stopping point on a well-traveled cycling loop.

== Climate ==
This region experiences warm (but not hot) and dry summers, with no average monthly temperatures above 71.6 °F (22.0 °C). According to the Köppen Climate Classification system, Alsea has a warm-summer Mediterranean climate, abbreviated "Csb" on climate maps.

Climate data for Alsea Fish Hatchery
| Month | Jan | Feb | Mar | Apr | May | Jun | Jul | Aug | Sep | Oct | Nov | Dec | Year |
|---|---|---|---|---|---|---|---|---|---|---|---|---|---|
| Record high °F (°C) | 55 (13) | 61 (16) | 65 (18) | 82 (28) | 94 (34) | 92 (33) | 95 (35) | 90 (32) | 83 (28) | 68 (20) | 62 (17) | 55 (13) | 95 (35) |
| Mean daily maximum °F (°C) | 46.2 (7.9) | 48.2 (9.0) | 50.2 (10.1) | 55 (13) | 61.7 (16.5) | 66.1 (18.9) | 74.5 (23.6) | 73.9 (23.3) | 69.2 (20.7) | 57.3 (14.1) | 49.2 (9.6) | 42.2 (5.7) | 57.8 (14.3) |
| Mean daily minimum °F (°C) | 36.3 (2.4) | 35.8 (2.1) | 36.5 (2.5) | 38.2 (3.4) | 42.4 (5.8) | 47.4 (8.6) | 49.8 (9.9) | 50.5 (10.3) | 47.9 (8.8) | 43.2 (6.2) | 39.6 (4.2) | 33.1 (0.6) | 41.7 (5.4) |
| Record low °F (°C) | 25 (−4) | 17 (−8) | 26 (−3) | 27 (−3) | 30 (−1) | 38 (3) | 40 (4) | 39 (4) | 39 (4) | 30 (−1) | 28 (−2) | 11 (−12) | 11 (−12) |
| Average precipitation inches (mm) | 14.85 (377) | 11.17 (284) | 11.15 (283) | 6.9 (180) | 4.05 (103) | 2.38 (60) | 0.65 (17) | 1.12 (28) | 2.85 (72) | 6.52 (166) | 13.94 (354) | 16.3 (410) | 91.89 (2,334) |
| Average snowfall inches (cm) | 1.7 (4.3) | 1.4 (3.6) | 0.5 (1.3) | 0 (0) | 0 (0) | 0 (0) | 0 (0) | 0 (0) | 0 (0) | 0 (0) | 0.1 (0.25) | 1.2 (3.0) | 4.9 (12) |
| Average precipitation days | 20 | 17 | 20 | 17 | 12 | 9 | 4 | 5 | 8 | 13 | 19 | 20 | 164 |

== Demographics ==
Historical population
| Census | Pop. | Note | %± |
|---|---|---|---|
| 2010 | 164 | | — |
| 2020 | 165 | | 0.6% |
U.S. Decennial Census

== School ==
Alsea Charter School, including Alsea High School, is a charter school that serves K-12 and has an enrollment of 321 students as of 2024.

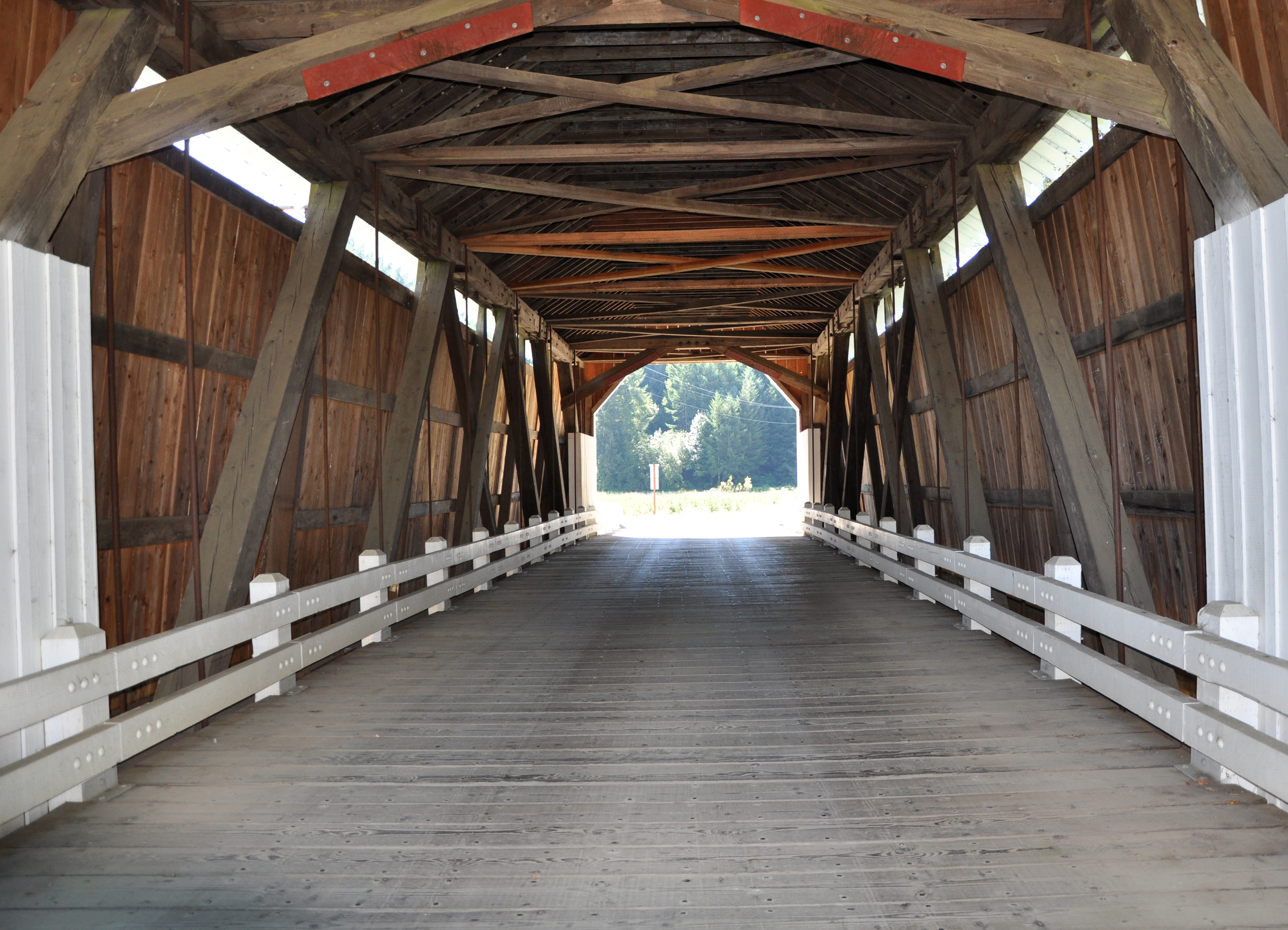
Interior of the Hayden Bridge over the Alsea River. View is to the south along Hayden Road west of Alsea, Oregon.

== Covered bridge ==
Near Alsea is Hayden Bridge, a historic covered bridge listed on the National Register of Historic Places in 1979. The bridge carries Hayden Road over the river from an intersection with Route 34 about 2 miles (3 km) west of Alsea.

== Notable people ==
- Thomas Benton Slate (December 2, 1880 – November 26, 1980) was raised in Alsea. He invented the first commercially viable method of producing dry ice, and later financed the construction of an all-aluminum hulled airship, The City of Glendale, completed in 1929 but never flown.
