= Alsea River =

River in Oregon, United States of America

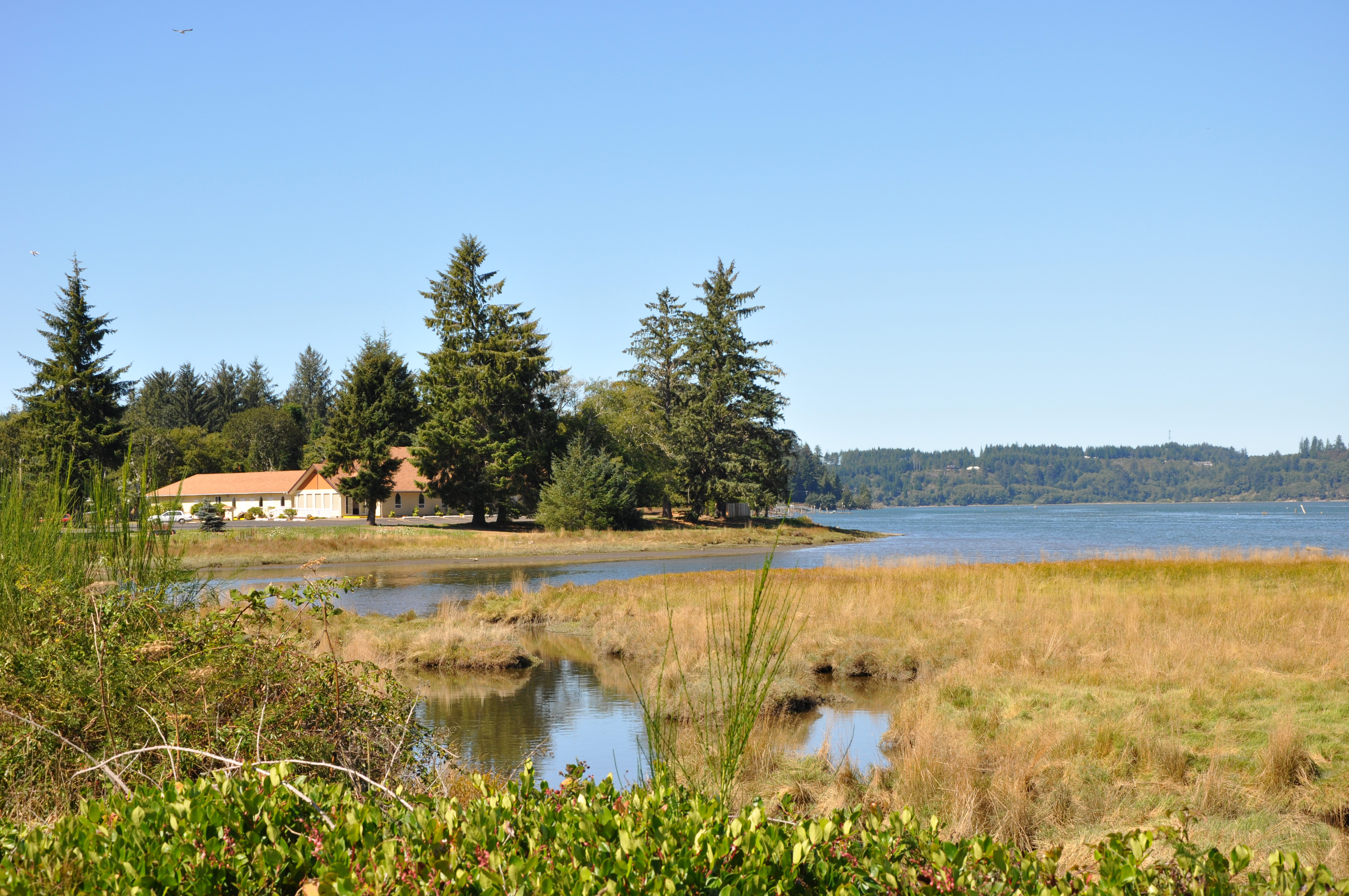
- Upper Alsea Bay

- Location of the mouth of the Alsea River in Oregon
- Etymology: Alsea tribe of Native Americans

Location
- Country: United States
- State: Oregon
- County: Benton County, Lincoln County

Physical characteristics
- Source
  - location: Lane County, Oregon
  - coordinates: 44°22′34″N 123°36′09″W
  - elevation: 278 ft (85 m)
- Mouth: Alsea Bay, Pacific Ocean
  - location: Waldport, Lincoln County, Oregon
  - coordinates: 44°25′21″N 124°04′51″W
  - elevation: 0 ft (0 m)
- Length: 48.5 mi (78.1 km)
- Basin size: 466 sq mi (1,210 km^{2})
- Discharge
  - location: near Tidewater, Oregon, 21 miles (34 km) from mouth
  - average: 1,459 cu ft/s (41.3 m^{3}/s)
  - minimum: 45 cu ft/s (1.3 m^{3}/s)
  - maximum: 41,800 cu ft/s (1,180 m^{3}/s)

The Alsea River flows 48.5 miles (78.1 km) from Alsea, an unincorporated community in the coastal mountains of the U.S. state of Oregon, to the Pacific Ocean near the city of Waldport. It begins at the confluence of the North Fork Alsea River and the South Fork Alsea River and ends in Alsea Bay, a wide estuary at Waldport. The river flows generally west-northwest in a winding course through the mountains of southern Benton and Lincoln counties, passing near the unincorporated community of Tidewater and through the Siuslaw National Forest. Its drainage basin extends into Lane County, along the headwaters of the South Fork Alsea River.

The Alsea River supports runs of chinook and coho salmon, as well as steelhead and coastal cutthroat trout. The Alsea River Fish Hatchery is along one of its tributaries, the North Fork Alsea River.

== Course ==
The Alsea River begins in the Central Oregon Coast Range near the unincorporated community of Alsea, and flows generally west about 48.5 miles (78.1 km) to the Pacific Ocean at Waldport, on the west coast of the United States. Formed by the confluence of the South Fork Alsea River and the North Fork Alsea River, the stream meanders through the Siuslaw National Forest for all but the last 6 miles (9.7 km) of its course. Oregon Route 34 and Marys Peak to Pacific Scenic Byway follows the river closely, crossing it once about 8 miles (13 km) from the mouth.

During its first 1 mile (1.6 km) or so, the river receives Cathcart Creek, Roberts Creek, and Mill Creek, all from the right, and passes Mill Creek Boat Landing on the right. Oregon Route 34 parallels the river on the north; that is, on the right facing downstream. Here the river begins a long, roughly U-shaped loop around the south end of Digger Mountain, which rises to 1,220 feet (370 m) above sea level at coordinates 44.3573430°N 123.7048297°W. Along this stretch, which is about 9 miles (14 km) long, the river passes under Hayden Covered Bridge; receives Schoolhouse Creek from the right, Birch Creek from the left, and Narrows Creek and Maltby Creek from the right, passes Campbell Boat Landing on the right and Salmonberry Boat Landing on the left, goes under Salmonberry Road, receives Salmonberry Creek from the left, passes Missouri Bend Recreation Site and Boat Ramp on the left, and receives Benner Creek from the left and Digger Creek from the right. Slightly west of the mountain, about 33.5 miles (53.9 km) from the mouth, the river leaves Benton County, and enters Lincoln County.

Passing Little Digger Mountain on the right, the river receives Fall Creek from the right, Cow Creek and Minotti Creek from the left, and Wolf Creek, Phillips Creek, Cedar Creek, and Butter Creek from the right as it passes Trenholm Saddle, a mountain gap at coordinates 44.3876206°N 123.7523311°W on the right about 31 miles (50 km) from the mouth. About 2 miles (3.2 km) later, the river begins another U-shaped loop of about 9 miles (14 km) around the south end of Stoney Mountain, which rises to 1,020 feet (310 m) above sea level.

Flowing around Stoney Mountain, the Alsea River receives Five Rivers and Lake Creek from the left, passes Blackberry Campground on the left, receives Grass Creek and Brush Creek from the left and Schoolhouse Creek from the right, passes Mike Bauer Picnic Grounds on the right and, shortly thereafter, a USGS gauging station on the right 21 miles (34 km) from the mouth. About 1 mile (1.6 km) further downstream, the river passes Slide Campground on the right before entering Hellion Rapids at coordinates 44.3923427°N 123.8334448°W. Downstream of the rapids, the river receives Scott Creek, Slide Creek, and Hatchery Creek, all from the right, and Line Creek from the left before reaching the unincorporated community of Tidewater, about 12 miles (19 km) from the mouth.

Between Tidewater and Alsea Bay, the river receives Mill Creek and Squaw Creek from the right, Canal Creek from the left, Risley Creek from the right, passes under Oregon Route 34, which then parallels the river on the south or left, and receives Arnold Creek from the left at about 8 miles (13 km) from the mouth. About 2 miles (3.2 km) later, it leaves the Siuslaw National Forest. Shortly thereafter, it receives Southworth Creek and Constantine Creek from the left and Drift Creek from the right. It receives Eckman Creek from the left, passes W. B. Nelson State Recreation Site on the left about 3 miles (4.8 km) from the mouth and enters Alsea Bay. As part of the bay, it receives Lint Creek from the left, passes Waldport on the left, flows under U.S. Route 101 over the Alsea Bay Bridge, and enters the Pacific Ocean at the mouth of the bay.

== See also ==
- List of rivers of Oregon
- Cascade Falls (Lincoln County, Oregon)
