= Corvallis, Oregon =

City in Benton County, Oregon, United States

- City
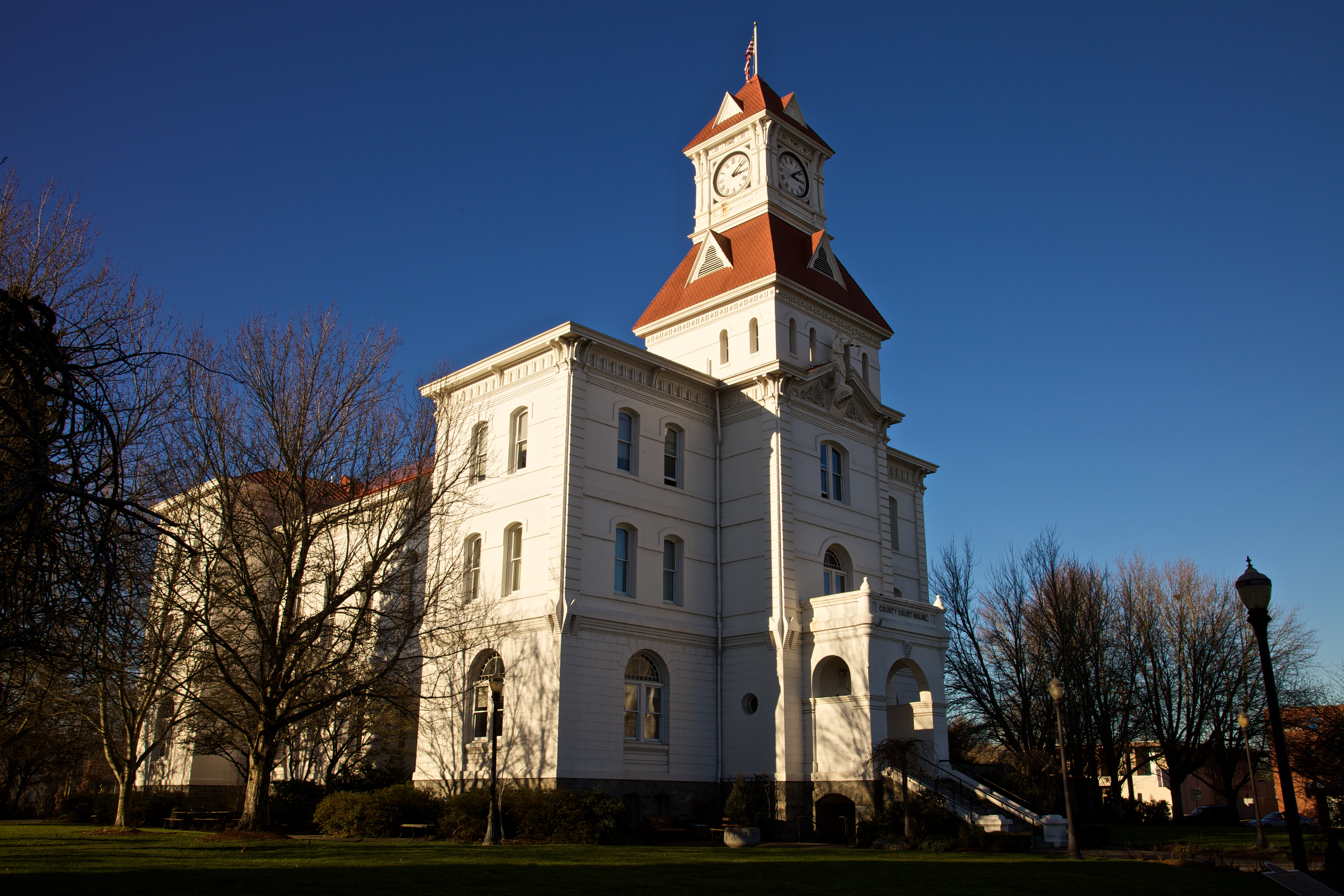
- Benton County Courthouse

- Flag
- Motto: Enhancing Community Livability
- Location of Corvallis within Benton County (left) and Benton County within Oregon (right)

- Location in Oregon Location in the United States
- Coordinates: 44°34′11″N 123°16′42″W
- Country: United States
- State: Oregon
- County: Benton
- Founded / Incorporated: 1845 / 1857

Government
  - Mayor: Charles Maughan

Area
  - City: 14.59 sq mi (37.79 km^{2})
  - Land: 14.46 sq mi (37.46 km^{2})
  - Water: 0.13 sq mi (0.33 km^{2})
- Elevation: 256 ft (78 m)

Population (2020)
  - City: 59,922
  - Density: 4,143.0/sq mi (1,599.64/km^{2})
  - Urban: 69,583 (US: 436th)
  - Metro: 97,713 (US: 365th)
- Demonym: Corvallisian

GDP
  - Metro: $6.035 billion (2023)
- Time zone: UTC−8 (PST)
  - Summer (DST): UTC−7 (PDT)
- ZIP codes: 97330-97331, 97333, 97339
- Area codes: 541, 458
- FIPS code: 41-15800
- GNIS feature ID: 2410237
- Website: www.corvallisoregon.gov

Corvallis (/kɔːrˈvælɪs/ kor-VAL-iss) is a city in and the county seat of Benton County in central western Oregon, United States. It is the principal city of the Corvallis, Oregon Metropolitan Statistical Area, which encompasses all of Benton County. As of the 2023 Census Population Estimates, the population was 61,087, making it the 9th most populous city in Oregon. This includes the 24,900 Oregon State University students at the main campus in Corvallis, over 5,250 of whom live in one of 16 residence halls on the main campus. Corvallis is the location of Oregon State University's 420-acre (170 ha) main campus, Samaritan Health Services, a top 10 largest non-profit employer in the state, an 84-acre (34 ha) Good Samaritan Regional Medical Center campus, and a 2,200,000-square-foot (200,000 m^{2}), 197-acre (80 ha) Hewlett Packard research and development campus. Corvallis is a part of the Silicon Forest. Corvallis is the westernmost city in the contiguous 48 states with a population larger than 50,000.

Corvallis is the largest principal city of the Albany–Corvallis–Lebanon CSA, a Combined Statistical Area that includes the Corvallis metropolitan area (Benton County) and the Albany–Lebanon micropolitan area (Linn County), which had a combined population of 229,209 at the 2023 U.S. Census Estimates.

== History ==
=== Establishment ===
In October 1845, Pennsylvanian Joseph C. Avery arrived in Oregon. Avery took out a land claim at the mouth of Marys River, where it flows into the Willamette River, and in June 1846 took up residence there in a log cabin hastily constructed to hold what seemed a potentially lucrative claim. Avery's primitive 1846 dwelling was the first home within the boundaries of today's city limits and his land claim included the southern section of the contemporary city.

Avery was quickly joined by other settlers along the banks of the Willamette River, including a 640-acre (260 ha) claim directly to his north taken in September 1846 by William F. Dixon. The discovery of gold in California in 1848 temporarily stalled the township development. Like many of his neighbors, Avery left his Oregon home to try his hand at gold mining in the fall of that year. His stay proved to be brief yet profitable. In January 1849, Avery returned to Oregon with a small stock of provisions with plans to open a store on his land.

During 1849, Avery opened his store at the site, platted the land, and surveyed a town site on his own claim, naming the community Marysville. The early town quickly became a profitable re-supply center/mercantile as one of the leading stop-overs for miners traveling the Willamette River to the California Gold Rush mines. The city was thought to have been originally named after early settler Mary Lloyd, but now the name is credited to early French fur trappers who camped near Marys Peak. The reference to "Mary" is, instead, believed to be named after the Virgin Mary.

In the summer of 1851, Joseph Avery and William Dixon each granted back-to-back 40-acre (16 ha) land parcels from their land holdings for the establishment of a county seat. Avery's holding lay to the south and Dixon's to the north, with the Benton County Courthouse marking the approximate line of demarcation between these two land parcels.

=== Name change ===
In December 1853 the 5th Oregon Territorial Legislature met in Salem, where a petition was presented seeking to change the name of that city to either "Thurston" or "Valena". At the same time, another petition was presented seeking to change the name of Salem to Corvallis, from the Latin meaning "heart of the valley", while a third resolution was presented to the upper house seeking to change the name of Marysville to Corvallis.

A heated debate followed, with the name ultimately awarded to Corvallis in an act passed on December 20 of that same year. By way of rationale, the name "Marysville" was successfully argued to duplicate the moniker of a town in California, located on the same stagecoach route and that a name change was thus necessary to avoid confusion.

=== Territorial Capitol ===
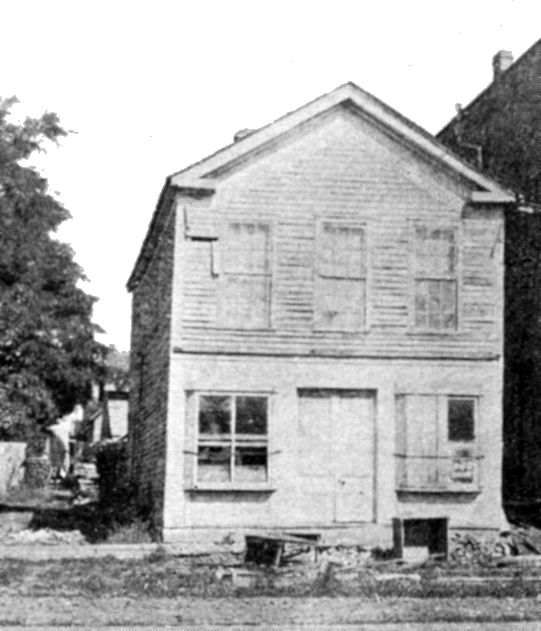
The building used as the Oregon state capitol in 1855, when the territorial capital was briefly located in Corvallis

A faction within the deeply divided legislature elected to make Corvallis the capital of the Oregon Territory in December 1855. After the 6th Territorial Legislature convened there, the capital was returned to Salem, which would eventually be selected as the permanent seat of state government. A plaque commemorates the former capital.

Corvallis was incorporated as a city on January 29, 1857.

=== 19th-century growth ===
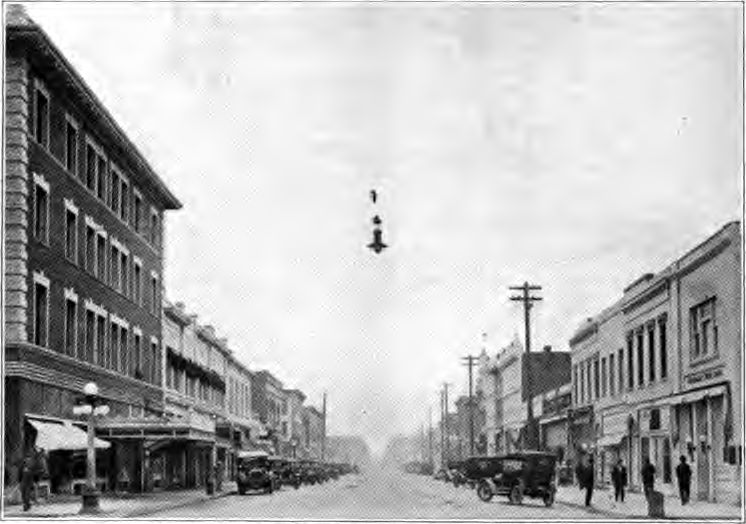
Downtown c. 1920

Corvallis had a three-year boom beginning in 1889, which began with the establishment of a privately owned electrical plant by L.L. Hurd. A flurry of publicity and public and private investment followed, including construction of a grand county courthouse, planning and first construction of a new street railway, construction of a new flour mill along the river between Monroe and Jackson Avenues, and construction of the Hotel Corvallis, today known as the Julian Hotel.

In addition, a carriage factory was launched in the city and the town's streets were improved, while the size of the city was twice enlarged through annexation. Bonds were issued for a city-owned water works, a sewer system, and for public ownership of the electric plant. A publicity campaign was launched to attempt to expand the tax base through new construction for new arrivals. This effort proved mostly unsuccessful, however, and in 1892, normality returned, with the city saddled with about $150,000 in bonded debt.

=== The early 20th century ===
In the first half of the 1900s, before WWII ended, Corvallis mostly grew westward, close to OSU in what is mostly now College Hill West Historic District.

== Geography ==
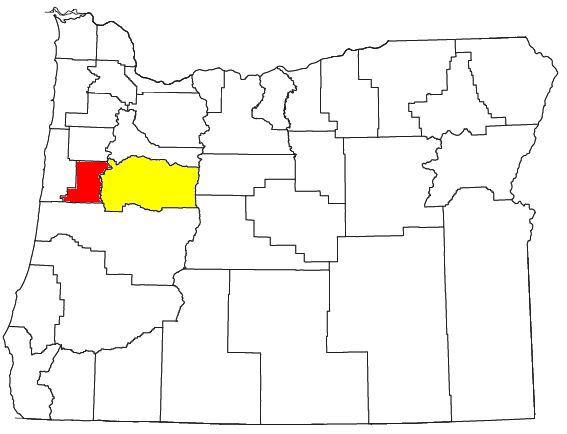
Location of the Albany-Corvallis-Lebanon CSA and its components: Corvallis Metropolitan Statistical Area Albany-Lebanon Micropolitan Statistical Area

Corvallis is at river mile 131–32 of the Willamette River. Corvallis is bordered on the northwest by the foothills of the Oregon Coast Range, with Bald Hill providing a view of the town.

According to the United States Census Bureau, the city has a total area of 14.30 square miles (37.04 km^{2}), of which 14.13 square miles (36.60 km^{2}) are land and 0.17 sq mi (0.44 km^{2}) is covered by water.

=== Climate ===
Corvallis

Climate chart (precipitation, max. and min. temperature)
J	F	M	A	M	J	J	A	S	O	N	D
6.5 47 34	4.8 51 35	5 56 37	3.3 61 40	2.3 68 45	1.3 74 49	0.3 83 52	0.4 84 51	1.5 78 48	3.5 65 42	6.5 53 38	7.7 47 34
- █ Average max. and min. temperatures in °F
- █ Precipitation totals in inches
Metric conversion
J	F	M	A	M	J	J	A	S	O	N	D
164 9 1	122 11 2	126 13 3	84 16 4	59 20 7	34 23 9	8.6 28 11	9.9 29 11	38 25 9	89 18 6	164 12 3	196 8 1
- █ Average max. and min. temperatures in °C
- █ Precipitation totals in mm

Like the rest of the Willamette Valley, Corvallis lies in the Marine West Coast climate zone, with Mediterranean characteristics. Under the Köppen climate classification scheme, Corvallis has a warm-summer Mediterranean climate (Köppen: Csb). Temperatures are mild year round, with warm, dry, sunny summers and mild, wet winters with persistently overcast skies. Spring and fall are also moist seasons with varied cloudiness, and light rain falling for extended periods.

Winter snow is rare, but occasionally does fall, and amounts can range between a dusting and a few inches that do not persist on the ground for more than a day. The northwest hills will often experience more snow. During the midwinter months after extended periods of rain, thick, persistent fogs can form, sometimes lasting the entire day. This can severely reduce visibility to as low as 20 feet (6.1 m). The fog often persists until a new storm system enters the area. This fog could be seen as a type of tule fog.

Rainfall totals within the town itself are surprisingly variable, due to Corvallis lying right on the eastern edge of the Oregon Coast Range, with a small portion of the town inside of the range. Rainfall amounts can range from an average of 66.40 inches (1,687 mm) per year in the far northwest hills, compared to 43.66 inches (1,109 mm) per year at Oregon State University, which is located in the center of Corvallis.

Because of its close proximity to the coastal range, Corvallis can experience slightly cooler temperatures, particularly in the hills, than the rest of the Willamette Valley. The average annual low temperature is 42 °F or 5.6 °C, 4.2 °F (2.3 °C) less than that of Portland just 85 miles (137 km) to the north. Despite this, temperatures dropping far below freezing are still a rare event.

Climate data for Corvallis, Oregon (Oregon State University), 1991–2020 normals, extremes 1893–present
Month	Jan	Feb	Mar	Apr	May	Jun	Jul	Aug	Sep	Oct	Nov	Dec	Year
Record high °F (°C)	66 (19)	69 (21)	82 (28)	91 (33)	96 (36)	110 (43)	109 (43)	108 (42)	103 (39)	92 (33)	73 (23)	66 (19)	110 (43)
Mean maximum °F (°C)	58.8 (14.9)	61.0 (16.1)	68.7 (20.4)	76.2 (24.6)	84.9 (29.4)	89.8 (32.1)	96.9 (36.1)	97.3 (36.3)	92.1 (33.4)	78.5 (25.8)	64.1 (17.8)	57.9 (14.4)	100.1 (37.8)
Mean daily maximum °F (°C)	47.4 (8.6)	51.3 (10.7)	56.1 (13.4)	60.9 (16.1)	68.1 (20.1)	73.8 (23.2)	82.9 (28.3)	83.7 (28.7)	77.6 (25.3)	65.0 (18.3)	53.2 (11.8)	46.7 (8.2)	63.9 (17.7)
Daily mean °F (°C)	40.9 (4.9)	43.0 (6.1)	46.5 (8.1)	50.2 (10.1)	56.3 (13.5)	61.2 (16.2)	67.5 (19.7)	67.6 (19.8)	62.9 (17.2)	53.5 (11.9)	45.4 (7.4)	40.3 (4.6)	52.9 (11.6)
Mean daily minimum °F (°C)	34.3 (1.3)	34.8 (1.6)	37.0 (2.8)	39.5 (4.2)	44.5 (6.9)	48.6 (9.2)	52.1 (11.2)	51.4 (10.8)	48.2 (9.0)	42.0 (5.6)	37.6 (3.1)	33.9 (1.1)	42.0 (5.6)
Mean minimum °F (°C)	23.6 (−4.7)	24.8 (−4.0)	28.8 (−1.8)	30.8 (−0.7)	34.7 (1.5)	39.6 (4.2)	44.9 (7.2)	43.8 (6.6)	38.7 (3.7)	31.2 (−0.4)	26.2 (−3.2)	22.3 (−5.4)	17.7 (−7.9)
Record low °F (°C)	−1 (−18)	−5 (−21)	12 (−11)	22 (−6)	28 (−2)	30 (−1)	36 (2)	37 (3)	27 (−3)	20 (−7)	10 (−12)	−8 (−22)	−8 (−22)
Average precipitation inches (mm)	6.46 (164)	4.80 (122)	4.95 (126)	3.29 (84)	2.31 (59)	1.34 (34)	0.34 (8.6)	0.39 (9.9)	1.49 (38)	3.50 (89)	6.46 (164)	7.71 (196)	43.04 (1,094.5)
Average snowfall inches (cm)	0.5 (1.3)	1.6 (4.1)	0.1 (0.25)	0.0 (0.0)	0.0 (0.0)	0.0 (0.0)	0.0 (0.0)	0.0 (0.0)	0.0 (0.0)	0.0 (0.0)	0.0 (0.0)	0.7 (1.8)	2.9 (7.45)
Average precipitation days (≥ 0.01 in)	21.1	17.7	19.8	17.7	12.9	8.2	2.6	3.2	7.0	14.8	20.6	21.9	167.5
Average snowy days (≥ 0.1 in)	0.5	0.6	0.3	0.0	0.0	0.0	0.0	0.0	0.0	0.0	0.0	0.4	1.8
Source 1: NOAA
Source 2: National Weather Service

== Demographics ==
Historical population
Census	Pop.	Note	%±
1880	1,128		—
1890	1,527		35.4%
1900	1,819		19.1%
1910	4,552		150.2%
1920	5,752		26.4%
1930	7,585		31.9%
1940	8,392		10.6%
1950	16,207		93.1%
1960	20,669		27.5%
1970	35,056		69.6%
1980	40,960		16.8%
1990	44,757		9.3%
2000	49,322		10.2%
2010	54,462		10.4%
2020	59,922		10.0%

Corvallis is the largest principal city of the Albany-Corvallis-Lebanon CSA, a Combined Statistical Area that includes the Corvallis metropolitan area (Benton County) and the Albany-Lebanon micropolitan area (Linn County), which had a combined population of 229,209 at the 2023 U.S. Census Estimates.

=== 2020 census ===
As of the 2020 census, there were 59,922 people living in Corvallis, which translated to a population density of 4,200.3 people per square mile (1,621.7 people/km^{2}). The median age was 27.5 years; 13.6% of residents were under the age of 18 and 13.9% of residents were 65 years of age or older. For every 100 females there were 100.9 males, and for every 100 females age 18 and over there were 100.3 males age 18 and over.

There were 23,876 households, of which 19.5% had children under the age of 18 living in them. Of all households, 33.8% were married-couple households, 26.6% were households with a male householder and no spouse or partner present, and 30.7% were households with a female householder and no spouse or partner present. About 33.3% of all households were made up of individuals and 10.6% had someone living alone who was 65 years of age or older.

There were 25,732 housing units, of which 7.2% were vacant. Among occupied housing units, 40.1% were owner-occupied and 59.9% were renter-occupied. The homeowner vacancy rate was 1.2% and the rental vacancy rate was 7.2%.

99.9% of residents lived in urban areas, while 0.1% lived in rural areas.

Racial composition as of the 2020 census
Race	Number	Percent
White	44,518	74.3%
Black or African American	778	1.3%
American Indian and Alaska Native	525	0.9%
Asian	5,786	9.7%
Native Hawaiian and Other Pacific Islander	222	0.4%
Some other race	2,320	3.9%
Two or more races	5,773	9.6%
Hispanic or Latino (of any race)	6,061	10.1%

=== 2010 census ===
As of the 2010 U.S. Census, there were 54,462 people, 22,283 households, and 10,240 families residing in the city. The population density was 4,004.5 people per square mile (1,546.1 people/km^{2}). There were 23,423 housing units at an average density of 1,722.3 per square mile (665.0/km^{2}). The racial makeup of the city was 83.8% White, 7.3% Asian, 1.1% Black or African American, 0.7% Native American, 0.3% Hawaiian or Pacific Islander, 2.8% from other races, and 4.0% from two or more races. 7.4% of the population were Hispanic or Latino of any race.

There were 22,283 households, of which 20.7% had children under the age of 18 living with them, 35.3% were married couples living together, 7.0% had a female householder with no husband present, and 54.0% were non-families. 33.2% of all households were made up of individuals, and 8.9% had someone living alone who was 65 years of age or older. The average household size was 2.22 and the average family size was 2.82.

In the city, 14.9% of the population was under the age of 18, 32.4% was from 18 to 24, 22.9% from 25 to 44, 19.3% from 45 to 64, and 10.5% was 65 years of age or older. The median age was 26.4 years. For every 100 males there were 98.7 females.

=== 2000 census ===
As of the 2000 U.S. Census the median income for a household in the city was $35,437, and the median income for a family was $53,208. Males had a median income of $40,770 versus $29,390 for females. The per capita income for the city was $19,317. About 9.7% of families and 20.6% of the population were below the poverty line, including 15.2% of those under age 18 and 6.0% of those age 65 or over.

=== Religion ===
In 1903, Franz Edmund Creffield, commonly known as Edmund Creffield (circa 1870–1906), a German-American religious leader who called himself Joshua, founded a movement in Corvallis called, "The Brides of Christ," which became known locally as the "Holy Rollers." He referred to himself as the second coming of Jesus.

Corvallis lies in the middle of the Unchurched Belt. A 2003 study, released once every 10 years, listed Benton County (of which Corvallis makes up the majority of the population) as the least religious county per capita in the United States. Only one in four people indicated that they were affiliated with one of the 149 religious groups the study identified. The study indicated that some of the disparity, however, may be attributed to the popularity of less common religions (ones not included as an option in the study) in the Pacific Northwest.

== Economy ==
The campus of Oregon State University, which is the major local employer, is located near the edge of the main downtown area.

Other major employers include Samaritan Health Services, SIGA Technologies, Evanite Fiber, ONAMI, and HP Inc., which has a large printing research and development operation in the northeast area of town. Because of this relative concentration of employment and the need for diversity, the city launched a website to attract creative industry to the region by branding it with the slogan "Yes Corvallis".

The National Clonal Germplasm Repository at Corvallis is a gene bank of the United States Department of Agriculture Agricultural Research Service. The gene bank preserves temperate fruit, nut, and agronomic crops from around the world.

Corvallis was ranked number 48 on the 100 best places in the US to live and launch a business by Fortune Small Business 2008. This places Corvallis as the second-best place in Oregon to launch a business, after Portland (number 6). Bend (number 87) and Eugene (number 96) were other Oregon localities ranked in the top 100.

== Arts and culture ==
=== Annual cultural events ===
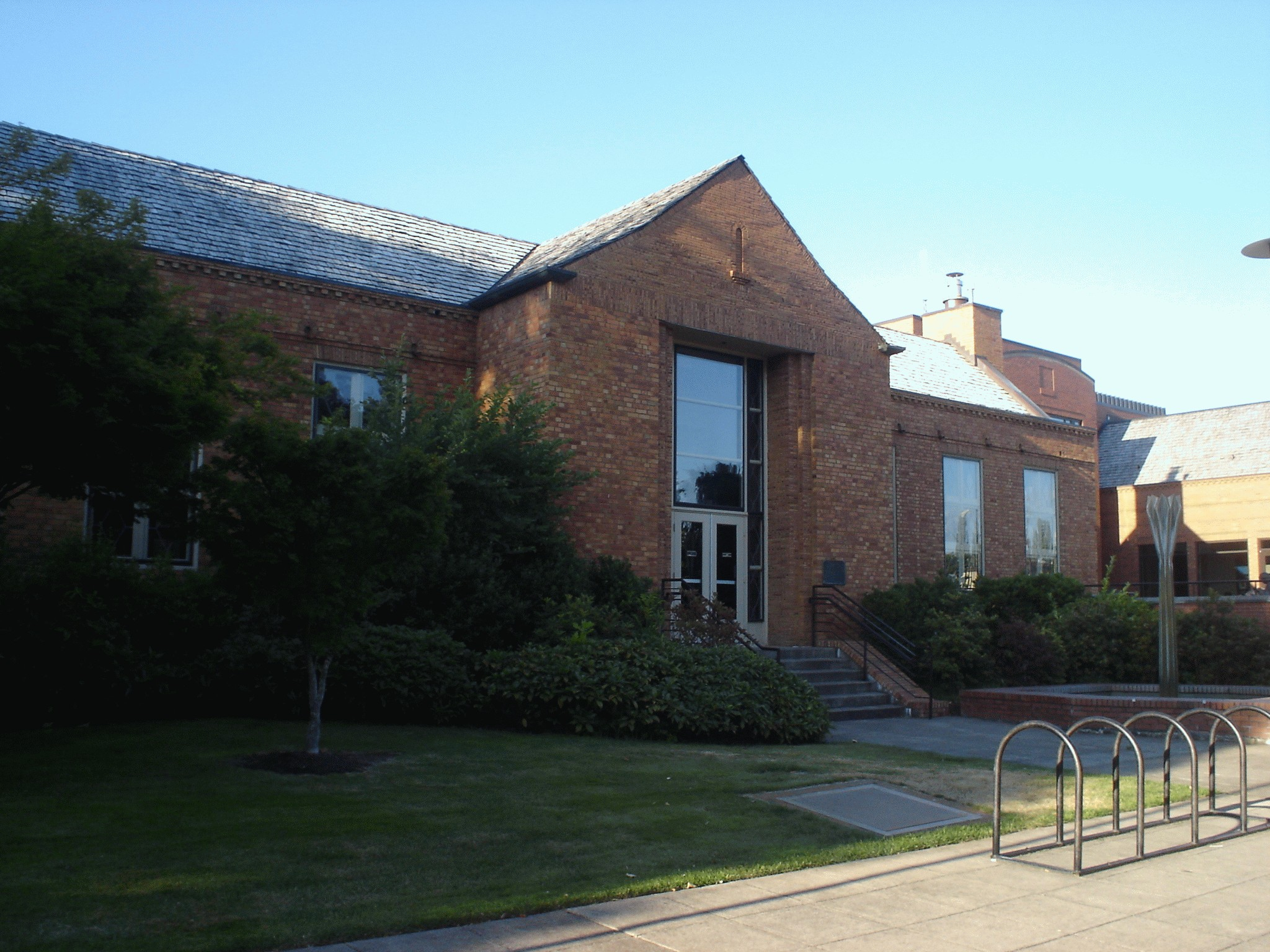
Corvallis-Benton County Public Library

- Downtown Corvallis Wine Walk, previously known as 'Rhapsody in the Vineyard' is an annual, sometimes biannual, hosted by the Corvallis Area Chamber of Commerce and is held in downtown Corvallis since 2012. It pairs local wineries up with, and inside of, downtown local retailers. Attendees get to sample wine and shop local. Anywhere between 15 and nearly 40 wineries and retailers participate annually. It typically takes place in late Spring or early Fall, with the 21st Wine Walk occurring in May 2024.
- Da Vinci Days Festival and Kinetic Sculpture Race is an annual festival held in Corvallis since 1988. The science, technology, and art based festival includes live music, a kinetic sculpture race during the summer event, and lecture series in the spring. The festival is named after Italian inventor, artist, and writer, Leonardo da Vinci. The festival celebrates its 31th anniversary in 2024.
- Red White and Blue Riverfront Festival occurs ever July 4 on the downtown Riverfront Park banks of the Willamette River with food, vendors and a main stage with live bands. The day begins with a parade through downtown Corvallis and ends at the Commemorative Riverfront Park. The parade began in 1985. A fireworks display is presented by the Corvallis Jaycees along the riverfront.
- Philomath Frolic & Rodeo is a family-oriented festival and rodeo focused on the traditions of the Philomath community was founded, namely American Western heritage and traditions and the history of the logging industry. It typically is held in mid-July. Originating in 1953 as the 'Philomath Western Frolic', it was later renamed 'Philomath Buckaroo and Loggers' Frolic'. In 1983 land was donated and an arena was contracted at Skirvin Park, creating what has since been known as the Philomath Frolic & Rodeo. The rodeo attracts over 5,000 spectators each year and has been distinguished as the Northwest Professional Rodeo Association "Rodeo of the Year" eight times (1994, 1995, 2000, 2001, 2005, 2006 and 2007).
- Corvallis Celtic Festival is a newer summertime celebration held in late July, in and around Central Park in Corvallis. It celebrates Celtic culture through lively music performances, participatory sessions, spirited dancing, and engaging workshops that showcase Celtic traditions. The 3rd annual Corvallis Celtic Festival was held July 24–27, 2025.
- Benton County Fair & Rodeo was first held in 1859 with it typically held annually since 1913 and has been at its current location at the Benton County Fairgrounds in West Corvallis, since 1956. The Benton County Fair & Rodeo celebrated "100 years of Rides, Ribbons & Rodeos" in 2013. The Fair & Rodeo includes carnival games, rides, animals, food, live music and the rodeo. The Benton County Fair is usually scheduled for the first weekend in August.
- SeptemBeerFest (September Beer Festival) is held annually since 2007 in September, "amongst the trees" in Avery Park in Corvallis. Septembeerfest is a family and pet friendly fun-filled community celebration of the local homebrewers and dozens of local breweries from the craft beer industry as well as a successful fundraiser for the "'Heart of the Valley Homebrewers"', a non-profit organization. The 17th annual Corvallis Septembeerfest will be held September 7, 2024.
- Corvallis Fall Festival is an Annual Arts Party in Central Park and was founded in 1972, with the 50th occurrence in 2022.
- BlockTober Fest, an annual event since 2008, coincides with Oktoberfest in downtown Corvallis and is hosted by local craft brew Block 15 Brewing. The Oktoberfest celebration takes place under the traditional big tent occupying one whole city block by their downtown Block 15 brew pub. The celebrations typically feature live German music, German-inspired beer and food, face painting, a Stein Holding Competition, German Spelling Bee, and College Football on the big screen.
- St. Anne Greek Fest, held annually since 2003, is typically in mid-October in the nearby unincorporated community of Lewisburg. The Saint Anne Greek Fest is held at the St. Anne Greek Orthodox Church grounds with live traditional Greek music, traditional Greek dances, face-painting, games and traditional Greek food. All the money raised by the festival goes to maintain the Lewisburg Grange Hall just north of the Corvallis city limits. The grange has been one of Benton County's most prominent historic landmarks. Built by executives of the O&C Railroad as a depot in 1911, trains stopped there for just 14 years until it became the grange hall for the unincorporated community of Lewisburg in 1925. The building faced significant peril by the early 1990s.
- 2 Town's Harvest Party, held annually since 2010 mid- to late October but before Halloween, is hosted by 2 Towns Ciderhouse, a national leader in hard ciders at their main facility. There are usually over 55 craft beverages on tap, a "pumpkin bar", hot cider bar, cidery tours, photo-booth, raffle, live music and food trucks to celebrate the harvest of locally grown apples for their award-winning ciders, with proceeds going towards a local non-profit or charity. In 2023 over 3,400 people attended the Harvest Party.
- Pastega Christmas Light Display begins just after Thanksgiving and lasts until just after New Years Day. The Pastega Drive-thru Christmas Light Display began in 1981 at a Pepsi Bottling Plant in North Corvallis. It was hosted there for 31 years, until 2013 when the display was moved across town to the Benton County Fairgrounds. The Display features over 200 figures and mechanized scenes. The radiant display of festive lights and mechanized decorations transforms the area into a holiday wonderland enjoyed by thousands. Between 400 and 700 cars visit the display each day it's open. In 2022 over 30,000 people drove through the display. It has been a Corvallis holiday tradition for over 40 years.

=== Museums and other points of interest ===
- Benton County Courthouse
- Corvallis Museum (Benton County Historical Society)
- Corvallis Arts Center
- Hesthaven Nature Center of the Mid-Willamette Bird Alliance
- McDonald State Forest
- Peavy Arboretum
- William L. Finley National Wildlife Refuge
- Alsea Falls
- Corvallis-Benton County Public Library
- Osborn Aquatic Center
- Corvallis Farmers' Market
- Corvallis Arts Walk
- Vineyard Mountain
- The Majestic Theatre
- Whiteside Theatre
- PRAx (Patricia Valian Reser Center for the Performing Arts)

=== Art galleries ===
- The Arts Center
- Giustina and Murdock Galleries
- Fairbanks Gallery
- Art in the Valley
- Pegasus Art Gallery
- Corvallis Art Guild
- Corvallis Mural Project

There are over 50 murals in and near town, and most within walking distance of each other in downtown Corvallis.

=== Music ===
==== Corvallis ====
Corvallis is home to the Corvallis-OSU Symphony, which celebrated its centennial in 2005. According to the OSU College of Liberal Arts website (as of 2022) the symphony is the oldest continuously operating orchestra in the state of Oregon.

Other musical organizations include:

- Corvallis Youth Symphony Association
- Chintimini Chamber Music Festival
- Chamber Music Corvallis
- Corvallis-OSU Piano International
- Corvallis Guitar Society
- Corvallis Community Band (Host annual "Summer Concerts in the Park" series at Central Park)
- Willamette Valley Symphony
- Heart of the Valley Children's Choir
- Hilltop Big Band

Along with these the Corvallis Environmental Center offers the "SAGE Live Music Concert Series" every summer at Bruce Starker Arts Park in Southwest Corvallis. In the Corvallis metro area, Philomath also hosts a "Music in the Park" summer concert series held at City Park.

==== Within the Albany–Corvallis–Lebanon Combine Statistical Area ====
- Albany Youth Orchestra
- Albany "River Rhythms" concert series

Named Oregon's best festival of its size in 2014, for over 30 years the River Rhythms concert series draws in acts with a wide variety of musical styles at Albany's Monteith Riverfront Park.

- Albany "Summer Sounds"

Live music in a relaxed outdoor atmosphere, the Summer Sounds concert series is a Monday night concert series at Albany's Monteith Riverpark each summer since 1997.

- Lebanon Community Chorus
- Lebanon Summer "Concerts in the Park" Series At Academy Square in downtown Lebanon.
- Lebanon "Summer Bands & Brews" Series At Strawberry Plaza in South Lebanon.
- Independence "Rivers Edge Summer Concert Series" At Independence's Riverview Riverfront Park.
- Monmouth "Music in the Park Series" At Monmouth's Main Street Park Amphitheater.
- WOU Chambers Singers
- Western Oregon Voices
- WOU Jazz Orchestra

==== Within the Willamette Valley ====
- Salem Pops Orchestra
- Willamette Master Chorus
- Oregon Symphany Orchestra
- Salem Youth Symphony
- Eugene Symphony
- Eugene Concert Choir
- Eugene-Springfield Youth Orchestra
- U of O Chamber Choir
- Organ Symphony

== Sports ==
As the home of Oregon State University, Corvallis is the home for 17 NCAA Division I OSU teams (7 men's, 10 women's). Corvallis is also the home of the Corvallis Knights baseball team, who play in the summer at OSU's Goss Stadium. The Knights play in the West Coast League, an independent collegiate summer baseball league with teams from Washington, Oregon, British Columbia and Alberta.

== Parks and recreation ==
Corvallis is recognized as a Tree City USA. The city has at least 47 public parks within and adjacent to the city limits. One such park is Avery Park and Natural Area, which is one of Corvallis' most popular parks. The Avery Park Cross Country Course is located in the park. It is the home course for the Oregon State Beavers cross-country teams. Beazell Memorial Forest, the largest park maintained by Benton County, is located 10 mi (16 km) from the town.

=== Parks in Corvallis ===
Corvallis and the greater Willamette Valley is known for its extensive trails, natural areas and parks system. There are over 40 parks and natural areas with miles of trails within the city limits and urban growth boundary.

Corvallis Parks & Natural Areas:

- Allen Berg Natural Area
- Arnold Park & Natural Area
- Avery Park
- Bald Hill Natural Area
- Brandis Natural Area
- Bruce Starker Arts Park
- Caldwell Natural Area
- Central Park
- Chepenafa Springs Park
- Chintimini Park
- Chip Ross Park & Natural Area
- Cloverland City Park
- Crystal Lake Sports Fields & Park
- Dr. Martin Luther King Jr. Park
- Eric Scott McKinley Skate Park
- Forest Dell Natural Area
- Garfield Park
- Grand Oaks Park
- Jackson-Frazier Wetlands
- Mary's River Natural Area
- Noyes Natural Area
- Lilly City Park
- Orleans Natural Area
- Owens Farm Natural Area
- Peavy Arboretum
- Pioneer Park
- Porter Park
- Riverbend Park
- Riverfront Commemorative Park
- Shawala Point Natural Area
- Sunset Park
- Timberhill Natural Area
- Tunison City Park
- Village Green Sports Fields & Park
- Vineyard Mountain
- Washington City Park
- Wildcat Park
- Willamette Park
- Witham Hill Natural Area
- Woodland Meadow Park

=== Parks in Albany–Corvallis–Lebanon CSA ===
There are over 67 Benton and Linn County Parks in the Albany–Corvallis–Lebanon CSA, 78 city parks, 2 national forest, 1 national wildlife refuge, 2 state forest and multiple rivers and lakes in the region.

Albany–Corvallis–Lebanon Forest, Parks and Natural Areas:

- Alsea Falls Recreation Site
- Cummins Creek Wilderness
- Drift Creek Wilderness
- Green Peter Reservoir
- Foster Reservoir
- Marys Peak
- McDonald-Dunn Research Forest
- McDowell Creek Falls
- Middle Santiam Wilderness
- Raninbow Falls
- Rock Creek Wilderness
- Sahalie Falls
- Santiam State Forest
- Siuslaw National Forest
- Thompson's Mills State Heritage Site
- Waterloo Falls
- Willamette National Forest
- William L. Finley National Wildlife Refuge

== Government ==
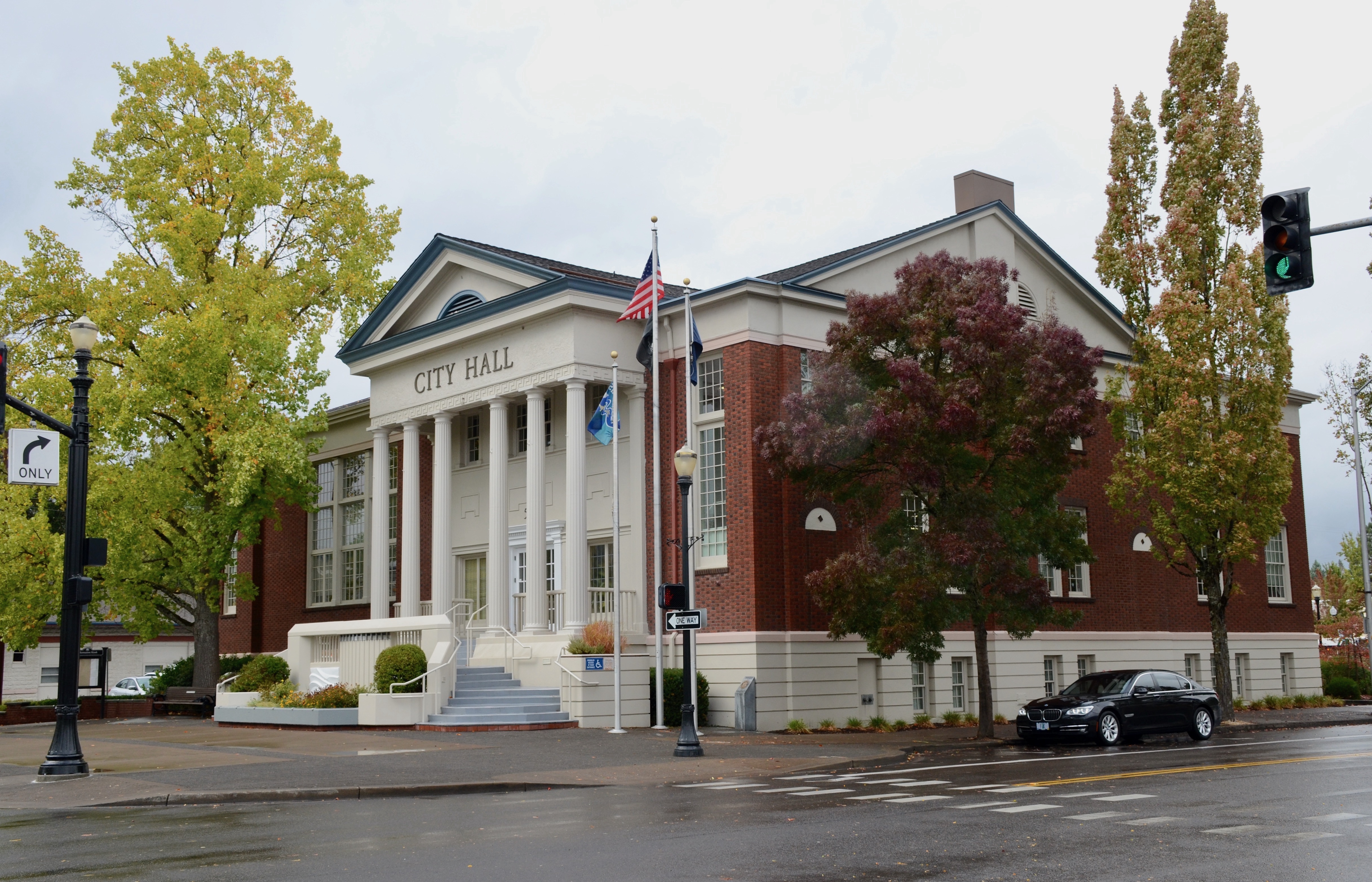
Corvallis City Hall

Helen Berg served as mayor of Corvallis for three terms from 1994 until 2006. Berg was the first female mayor of Corvallis, and the longest-serving mayor of the city to date. The current mayor is Charles Maughan, elected in 2022.

The City of Corvallis uses the City Council/City Manager form of government with a weak mayor. The City Council is made of nine city councilors who represent their representative wards and are elected to two-year terms. The City Manager is appointed by the City Council and serves at the pleasure of the City Council. The City Manager primary job is to run the administrative day-to-day operations of the city.

Corvallis current elected officials
Position	Name	Ward/at-large	Term expires
Mayor	Charles Maughan	City (at-large)	December 31, 2026
City Councilor	Jan Napack	Ward 1	December 31, 2026
City Councilor	Briae Lewis	Ward 2	December 31, 2026
City Councilor	Jim Moorfield	Ward 3	December 31, 2026
City Councilor	Ava Olson	Ward 4	December 31, 2026
City Councilor/Council Vice-president	Charlyn Ellis	Ward 5	December 31, 2026
City Councilor	Alison Bowden	Ward 6	December 31, 2026
City Councilor/Council President	Paul Shaffer	Ward 7	December 31, 2026
City Councilor	Carolyn Mayers	Ward 8	December 31, 2026
City Councilor	Tony Cadena	Ward 9	December 31, 2027

The Corvallis Police Department provides law enforcement services to the city.

== Education ==
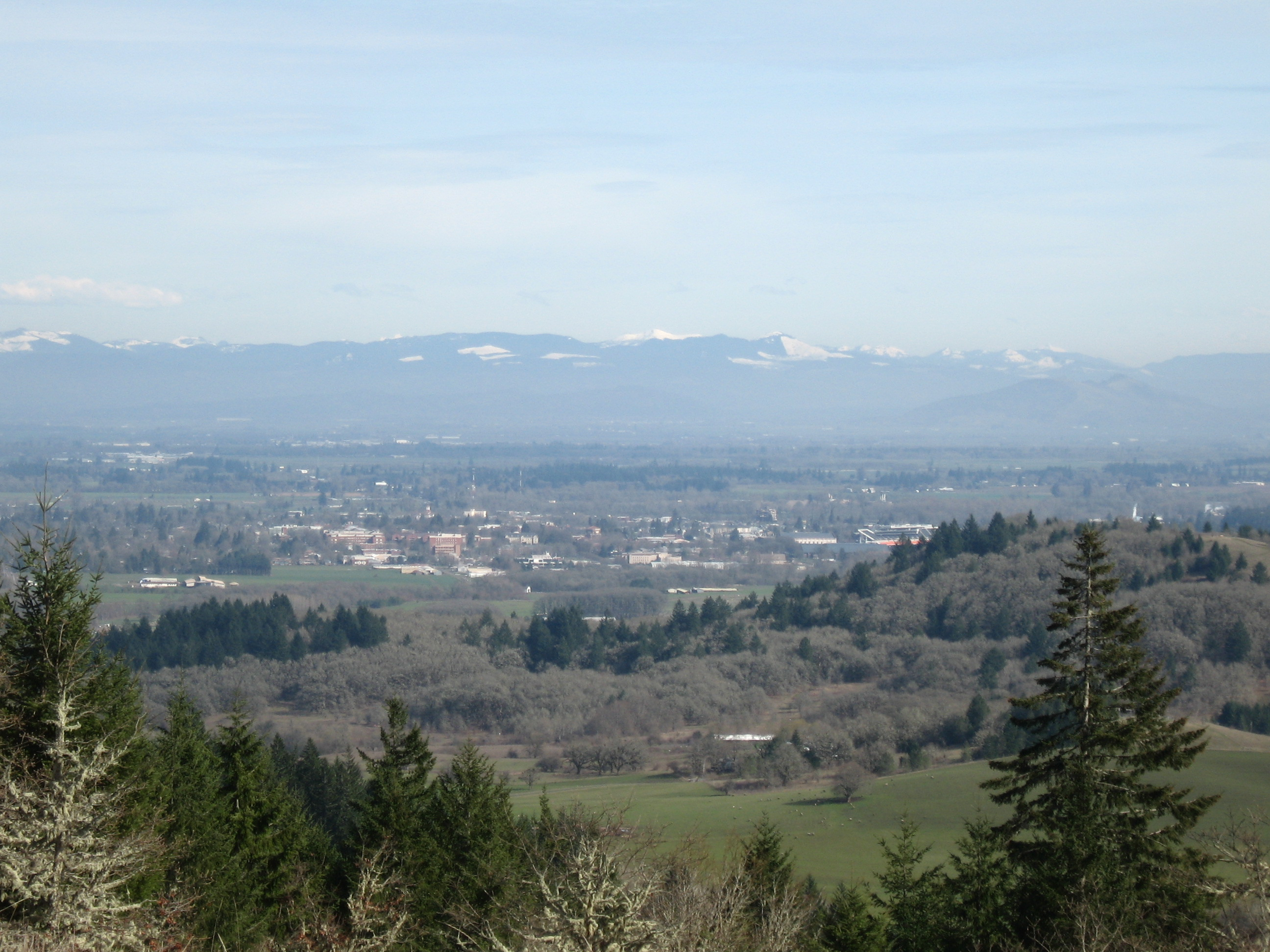
The OSU campus and Cascade Range from Fitton Green Natural Area

Education has had a place in Corvallis since the earliest days of the town, with the first school building constructed in 1848 and put to use in 1850.

During the first decade of the 21st century, local boosters claimed that Corvallis had the highest education rate per capita of any city in the state of Oregon.

Public schools in the city are administered by the Corvallis School District, with two acting high schools, Corvallis High School and Crescent Valley High School. Both high schools' attendance boundaries cover portions of the city limits, and the former is in the city limits. Corvallis is also the home of Oregon State University and the Benton Center campus of Linn-Benton Community College.

== Media ==
=== Print ===
- Willamette Living Magazine – lifestyle publication based in Corvallis.
- Corvallis Gazette-Times – a daily newspaper. The paper was created in 1909 as the result of the merger of two competing weekly newspapers, The Corvallis Gazette (established 1862), and The Corvallis Times (established 1888).
- The Corvallis Advocate – a free alternative newsweekly.

=== Radio ===
Local radio stations serving the Corvallis area:

Channel	Name
88.7 FM	KBVR
90.3 FM	KAKK
92.9 FM	KWAX (repeater)
95.7 FM	KBPK
101.5 FM	KFLY
103.1 FM	KOPB
104.3 FM	KBOO
105.9 FM	KORC
106.3 FM	KLOO
550 AM	KOAC
1240 AM	KEJO
1340 AM	KLOO

=== Television ===
- Corvallis:

Corvallis has 1 television station within the city and 3 Translator stations. KAOC-TV is an Oregon Public Broadcasting/ PBS station. KLSR-TV (FOX 34 Eugene), KGW (NBC 8 Portland) and KATU (TV) (ABC 2 Portland) have translators within the city.

-KAOC-TV

Channel	Name
7.1	PBS TV
7.2	OBP Kids
7.3	OBP World
7.4	OPB-FM Jazz Radio

Translator stations for:

-KLSR-TV (FOX 34 Oregon) at K14GW-D

Channel	Name
34.1	Fox 34 Oregon News
34.2	MyNet
23.1	KEVU-CD

-KGW (NBC 8 Portland) at K16ML-D

Channel	Name
8.1	KGW News
8.2	True Crime Network
8.3	Quest (American TV network)
8.4	Nosey TV
8.5	This TV
8.6	TheGrio

-KATU (TV) (ABC 2 Portland) at K08PZ-D

Channel	Name
2.1	KATU (TV)
2.2	Charge! (TV network)
2.3	Comet (TV network)
2.4	TBD (TV network)

- Within the Albany-Corvallis-Lebanon Combine Statistical Area:

There is 1 additional television station within the Albany-Corvallis-Lebanon combine statistical area and 1 additional Translator station in the Albany-Corvallis-Lebanon combine statistical area. KSLM-LD is based in Dallas, Oregon. KPDX (FOX 12 Portland) has a translator in neighboring Albany.

-KSLM-LD (Dallas, Oregon) at KVDO-LD in Albany

Channel	Name
3.1	QVC
17.1	YTA TV
27.1	Retro TV
37.1	Azteca América

-KPDX (FOX 12 Portland) at K20DD-D in Albany

Channel	Name
49.1	MyNet TV
49.2	Ion Mystery
49.3	Outlaw TV
49.4	Court TV

- Within the Willamette Valley:

Corvallis is a part of the Eugene radio and television market with stations such as KVAL, KEZI and KMTR. Corvallis also is within the Salem and Portland area TV market worth stations such as Portland-Salem's CW, KATU, KOIN and KGW are also available on select cable providers.

== Infrastructure ==
=== Transportation ===
In 2009, the Corvallis metropolitan statistical area (MSA) ranked as the highest in the United States for percentage of commuters who biked to work (9.3%), and the second-highest percentage of commuters who walked to work (11.2%). More than one of five Corvallis commuters traveled to work via some form of active transportation. In 2013, the Corvallis MSA represented the fifth-lowest mode share for commuting by private automobile (72.6%). During the same period, 8.8% of Corvallis-area commuters biked, another 7.9% walked, and 7.7% worked from home.

==== Air ====
Corvallis Municipal Airport (CVO) serves private and corporate aircraft. Many well known celebrities have flown in and out of the Corvallis Municipal Airport over the years including John F. Kennedy in 1960, Oprah Winfrey and Michelle Obama.

The closest commercial air service is available at Eugene Airport (EUG), 35 miles (56 km), Salem Airport (SLE), 40 miles (64 km) or Portland International Airport (PDX), 95 miles (153 km).

The Groome Transportation Company provides multiple shuttles daily between Corvallis and the Portland Airport (PDX) with stops in Albany, Salem and Woodburn.

==== Train ====
Historically Corvallis had a very busy passenger train station and depot that was located downtown. They are no longer in use, but have been moved to other areas in the city, preserved, and repurposed. The Corvallis passenger train station is currently the Corvallis Old Spaghetti Factory restaurant. Passenger service is currently provided by the Amtrak Cascades line at the nearby Albany Amtrak Station (ALY).

There are 2 freight lines that run through the city regularly.

==== Bus ====
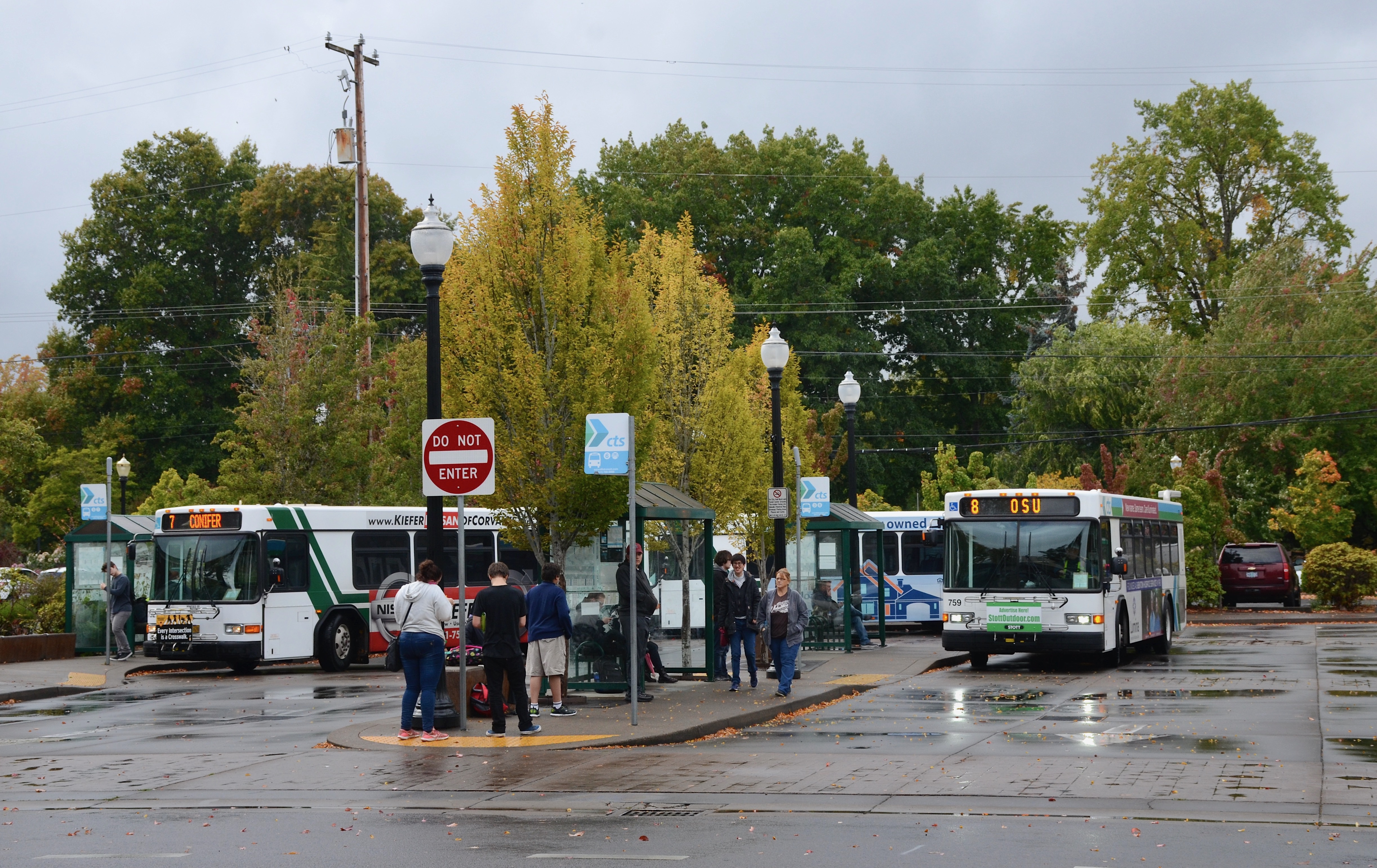
Corvallis Transit's Downtown Transit Center

Long-distance bus service is provided in Corvallis by Greyhound. It stops at the Downtown Transit Center and at OSU campus Transit stop (station ID: CVI and CVO).

FlixBus provides Regional service from the Downtown Transit Center and OSU campus Transit Center. There are 4 daily trips southbound to Eugene and the U of O campus, and 4 daily northbound trips to Albany, Salem, and Portland.

Local bus service is provided by 3 different transit systems, the Corvallis Transit System (CTS), the Benton Area Transit System (BAT) and the OSU Transit System "Beaver Bus". The Corvallis City Council approved an additional fee on monthly water utility bills in January 2011, allowing all CTS bus service to become fareless.

The CTS system runs a total of 9 routes within the city limits, Monday through Saturday with routes 1 through 6 having Sunday service at reduced frequency, covering most of the city and converging at the Downtown Transit Center. Additional commuter trips run in the early morning and late afternoon on weekdays, and midmorning and midafternoon on Saturdays.

One short-distance intercity route, the "Philomath Connection", is also run by CTS with multiple daily trips from the Downtown Transit Center to downtown Philomath with stops on the OSU campus. The "Linn-Benton Loop", operated by the Albany Transit System, runs multiple trips daily to the Albany Transit Center/ Albany Amtrak Station (ALY) and Linn-Benton Community College with three weekday routes and one Saturday route.

Two other intercity routes are run by the Benton Area Transit System (BAT) from the Downtown Transit Center and OSU campus Transit Center. The "99 Express" runs multiple trips daily to Lewisburg and Adair Village. The "Coast to Valley Express" runs multiple trips daily between the Albany Amtrak station (ALY) and the Newport Transit Center with stops in Philomath, Blodgett, Eddyville and Toledo.

One intercity route is run by Pacific Crest Bus Lines with stops at the Downtown Transit Center and on the OSU campus. The "99 Vine" runs four trips in each direction between McMinnville and Eugene. The "99 Vine" is fareless until June 30, 2026 due to a funding grant.

The Beaver Bus is run by Oregon State University Transportation Services for transportation across the main campus. The Beaver Bus has 3 routes from the Reser Stadium Transit Center and has multiple stops throughout campus. Buses arrive at every stop every 15–20 minutes from 7am-7pm.

From 2010 to 2011, CTS has seen a 37.9% increase in ridership, partially as a result of going fareless and "the rising cost of fuel for individual vehicles and the desire for residents to choose more sustainable options for commuting to work, school and other activities" According to Tim Bates, the Corvallis Transit System and Philomath Connection had 3,621,387 passenger miles traveled and 85,647 gallons of fuel consumed in fiscal year 2011, a period that covers July 1, 2010 – June 30, 2011. In 2019, the local bus system expanded to several more lines throughout the city, and the addition of a minimal Sunday service.

==== Highways ====
- Highway 34

Oregon State Route 34 is the main connector from Corvallis to I-5, the main arterial north–south route though the state of Oregon, which lies 10–12 miles to the east of the city. Continuing on OR 34 another 9–10 miles east of I-5 is the city of Lebanon, Oregon the 3rd largest city of the Albany-Corvallis-Lebanon CSA. Westward on OR 34 connects Corvallis to Philomath, Marys Peak, Alsea and Waldport on the Oregon Coast.

- Highway 20

US Route 20 is the main connector between the cities of Corvallis and Albany, Oregon, which is the 2nd largest city of the Albany-Corvallis-Lebanon CSA. US 20 runs approximately parallel to the Willamette River for 11 miles Northeast of Corvallis until it reaches North Albany and crosses the Willamette River into Downtown Albany. Westward US 20 connects Corvallis to Philomath, Blodgett, Eddyville, Toledo and Newport and the Oregon Coast.

- Highway 99W

Oregon State Route 99W runs a north–south route and is the main connector between Corvallis and Eugene, Oregon, 44 miles to the South. On Highway 99w in between the cities of Corvallis and Eugene are the cities of Monroe, Oregon and Junction City. To the north on OR 99W from Corvallis are the cities of Adair Village, Monmouth, Independence, Rickreall, Amity and McMinnville.

==== Bridges ====
There are eight major bridges in the city, all but two traverse the Mary's River or the Willamette River.

- Harrison Street Bridge
- Van Buren Street Bridge
- Willamette River Bridge (Highway 34)
- Mary's River Bridge (Highway 99W)
- 4th Street Bridge (Highway 99W over Mary's River)
- Pacific Highway Bridge (Highway 99W over Railroad in North Corvallis)
- 15th Street Bridge (Over Mary's River to Avery Park)
- Irish Bend Covered Bridge

There are over 100 street and pedestrian crossings that traverse over the tributaries throughout the city. There are 13 creeks and 2 rivers that run through the city.

Creek	Neighborhoods/ Location	Street/ Pedestrian crossings	Tributary
Dixon Creek	Glenridge, Timberhill, Northwest & Central Corvallis	34	Willamette River
Oak Creek	Cardwell Hill, Bald Hill, OSU campus & Southwest Corvallis	18	Mary's River
Dunawi Creek	Sunset, County Club & Southwest Corvallis	15	Mary's River
Sequoia Creek	9th Street & Northeast Corvallis	10	
Ryon Creek	Crystal Lake, South Town & South Corvallis	3	Willamette River
Muddy Creek	Country Club & Southwest Corvallis	2	Mary's River
Mulkey Creek	Bald Hill & West Corvallis	4	Oak Creek
Alder Creek	Bald Hill & West Corvallis	2	Oak Creek
Skunk Creek	Bald Hill & West Corvallis	2	Oak Creek
Village Green Creek	Village Green, Conifer & Northeast Corvallis	5	Jackson-Frazier wetlands
Jackson Creek	Crescent Valley & Northeast Corvallis	3	Jackson-Frazier wetlands
Frazier Creek	Crescent Valley & Northeast Corvallis	3	Jackson-Frazier wetlands
Owl Creek	Colardo Lake, Eastgate, Peoria & East Corvallis	3	Colorado Lake

==== Bicycle ====
The League of American Bicyclists gave Corvallis a gold rating as a Bicycle-Friendly Community in 2011. Also, according to the United States Census Bureau's 2008–12 American Community Survey, 11.2% of workers in Corvallis bicycle to work. The city of Corvallis is ranked third-highest among 'small' U.S. cities (with populations under 200,000) for bicycle commuters, behind Key West, Florida (17.4%) and Davis, California (18.6%).

=== Utilities ===
==== Water ====
The city's water system has two water treatment plants, nine processed water reservoirs, one raw water reservoir, and some 210 miles (340 km) of pipe. The system can process up to about 19 million US gallons (72,000 m^{3}) of water per day.

The Rock Creek treatment plant processes water from sources in the 10,000-acre (40 km^{2}) Rock Creek Municipal Watershed near Marys Peak. The three sources are surface streams, which are all tributaries of the Marys River. Rock Creek has a processing capacity of 7 million US gallons (26,000 m^{3}) of water per day (gpd), though operational characteristics of the 9-mile (14 km), 20-inch (51 cm) pipeline to the city limits capacity to half that. The Rock Creek Plant output remains steady year round at about 3 million US gallons (11,000 m^{3}).

The H.D. Taylor treatment plant obtains water from the Willamette River, and has been expanded at least four times since it was first constructed in 1949. Its output varies seasonally according to demand, producing from 2 to 16 million US gallons (7,600 to 60,600 m^{3}) per day, though it has a capacity of 21 million US gallons (79,000 m^{3}) per day.

The total reservoir capacity is 21 million US gallons (79,000 m^{3}), though measures to voluntarily reduce water usage begin when reservoir levels fall below 90% of capacity, and become mandatory at 80% or below. As part of its ongoing water-conservation program, the water department jointly publishes a guide to water-efficient garden plants.

==== Green power ====
According to the federal Environmental Protection Agency report on its "green power communities", Corvallis is among the top cities in the nation in terms of buying electricity produced from renewable resources. Corvallis purchases more than 126 million kilowatt-hours of green power annually, which amounts to 21% of the city's total purchased electricity.

=== Fire department ===
The Corvallis Fire Department is headed by Fire Chief Ben Janes as of February 14, 2022, and currently has four stations in the City and 1 station located in the Corvallis Rural Fire Protection District which is staffed by 1 paid Lieutenant and several Interns. A sixth fire station was shuttered several years ago due to budgeting shortfalls and remains closed to date. Corvallis Fire provides ALS ambulance service for all of Benton County with 6 frontline ambulances. In 2024 CFD ran around 12,000 calls for service. The Corvallis Professional Firefighters IAFF Local 2240 represents all line personnel and prevention staff.

== Notable people ==
This list excludes persons whose only connection to Corvallis is attendance or employment at Oregon State University.

- Lucia H. Faxon Additon (1847–1919), writer, teacher, social reformer
- Edward Allworth (1895–1966), Medal of Honor recipient
- Debra Arlyn (born 1986), singer-songwriter
- Daniel Atkinson (1921–2024), biochemist at UCLA who spent his retirement years in Corvallis
- Joseph C. Avery (1817–1876), Marysville town founder and politician
- Brad Badger (born 1975), NFL player
- Brad Bird (born 1957), Academy Award-winning animator, writer, and director (The Incredibles, The Iron Giant, Ratatouille)
- Kevin Boss (born 1984), NFL tight end, Super Bowl XLII champion with the New York Giants
- Chris Botti (born 1962), jazz trumpet musician
- Meredith Brooks (born 1958), singer, songwriter, producer
- James Cassidy, member of band Information Society
- Meghna Chakrabarti, journalist, radio producer, NPR
- Randy Couture, mixed martial artist and UFC Hall of Fame member
- Edmund Creffield, founder of "Bride of Christ Church", also known as "Holy Rollers"
- Meghann Cuniff (born 1983), legal journalist
- Morgan Eckroth (born 1998), barista, winner of the 2022 United States Barista Championship and online content creator
- Christopher L. Eisgruber, Rhodes Scholar and 20th president of Princeton University
- Atta Elayyan (1985–2019), New Zealand futsal player, murdered in the Christchurch mosque shootings
- Dick Fosbury (1947–2023), 1968 Olympics gold medalist and innovator of modern back-first method of high jumping
- Bob Gilder (1950–), professional golfer, member of Champions Tour
- Gordon Gilkey (1912–2000), artist and educator
- Kevin Gregg (1978–), MLB player
- Les Gutches (1973–), Olympic wrestler, world champion
- Elizabeth Hoffman, actress
- Talanoa Hufanga, NFL player
- Nick Hundley (1983–), MLB player
- Eyvind Kang, violinist and composer
- Paul Kocher, cryptographer
- Jon Krakauer, author (Into Thin Air, Under the Banner of Heaven, etc.) and mountaineer
- Wayne Krantz, guitarist
- Jane Lubchenco, marine biologist, named in 2009 to head National Oceanic and Atmospheric Administration
- Bernard Malamud, author, writer of The Natural; his book A New Life was based on Corvallis
- Ben Masters (1947–), actor, notable for soap opera Passions, stage and film works
- Ralph Miller (1919–2001), basketball coach, enshrined in Naismith Memorial Basketball Hall of Fame
- Barbara Minty, (also known as Barbara Minty McQueen) Vogue model and wife of late actor Steve McQueen
- Rebecca Morris, broadcast, radio, and print journalist, The New York Times bestselling nonfiction author
- Sara Nelson (1973–), an American union leader who serves as the international president of the Association of Flight Attendants-CWA, AFL–CIO
- Mario Pastega (1916–2012), businessman and philanthropist
- Linus Pauling (1901–1994), 1954 Nobel Prize in Chemistry and 1962 Nobel Peace Prize (graduate of Oregon Agricultural College, now Oregon State)
- Naomi Pomeroy (1974–2024), chef and restaurateur
- Putsata Reang, journalist, writer
- Jason Reed, actor, musician
- Harold Reynolds (1960–), MLB player and broadcaster
- Doug Riesenberg (1965–), former NFL offensive tackle
- Mike Riley (1953–), former head coach of Nebraska Cornhuskers, former coach of NFL's San Diego Chargers
- Nathan Sexton, professional disc golfer and winner of the 2017 United States Disc Golf Championship
- Jordan Smotherman, pro hockey player
- Robb Thomas, former NFL player
- Thomas Jones Thorp, Union Army officer
- Ernest H. Wiegand, professor of horticulture and developer of modern method of manufacture of the maraschino cherry
- Carl Wieman, 2001 Nobel Prize in Physics recipient for creation of Bose–Einstein condensate
- Bushrod Washington Wilson (1828–1900), pioneer, railroad executive, and county functionary
- Mike Zandofsky, former NFL player

== Sister cities ==
Corvallis has two sister cities, as designated by Sister Cities International:

- Gondar, Ethiopia
- Uzhhorod, Zakarpattia Oblast, Ukraine
