= Bald Hill (Oregon) =

Hill in Oregon, United States

- Location within Oregon

Highest point
- Elevation: 755 ft (230 m)
- Prominence: 440 ft (130 m)
- Coordinates: 44.5656765°N 123.3348229°W

Geography
- Location: Corvallis, Oregon, United States
- Parent range: Oregon Coast Range

Bald Hill is a hill in the Willamette Valley west of Corvallis, Oregon. With an elevation of 755 feet (230 m) and a top clear of tree cover, Bald Hill is a popular local hiking destination and lookout, with Corvallis, Mary's Peak, the Coastal Range, and the Cascade Range foothills all visible from atop the hill.

Bald Hill is part of the Bald Hill Natural Area, a 284-acre (115 ha) park that contains 10 miles (16 km) of trails through oak savanna remnants and denser forest which are managed to provide habitat for endemic plant species and wildlife.

== Geography ==
Bald Hill is located at the western edge of the Willamette Valley, where it meets the Oregon Coast Range. South of the Cardwell Hills, Bald Hill is separated from the foothills of the Coastal Range by Oak Creek and Mulkey Creek.

== History ==
The Bald Hill Natural Area was purchased by the Greenbelt Land Trust in 1990 and turned over to the City of Corvallis in 1993. In 2013, the land trust bought the neighboring Bald Hill Farm, and additional trail connections were added between Bald Hill and nearby parks.
