= Oak Creek (Marys River tributary) =

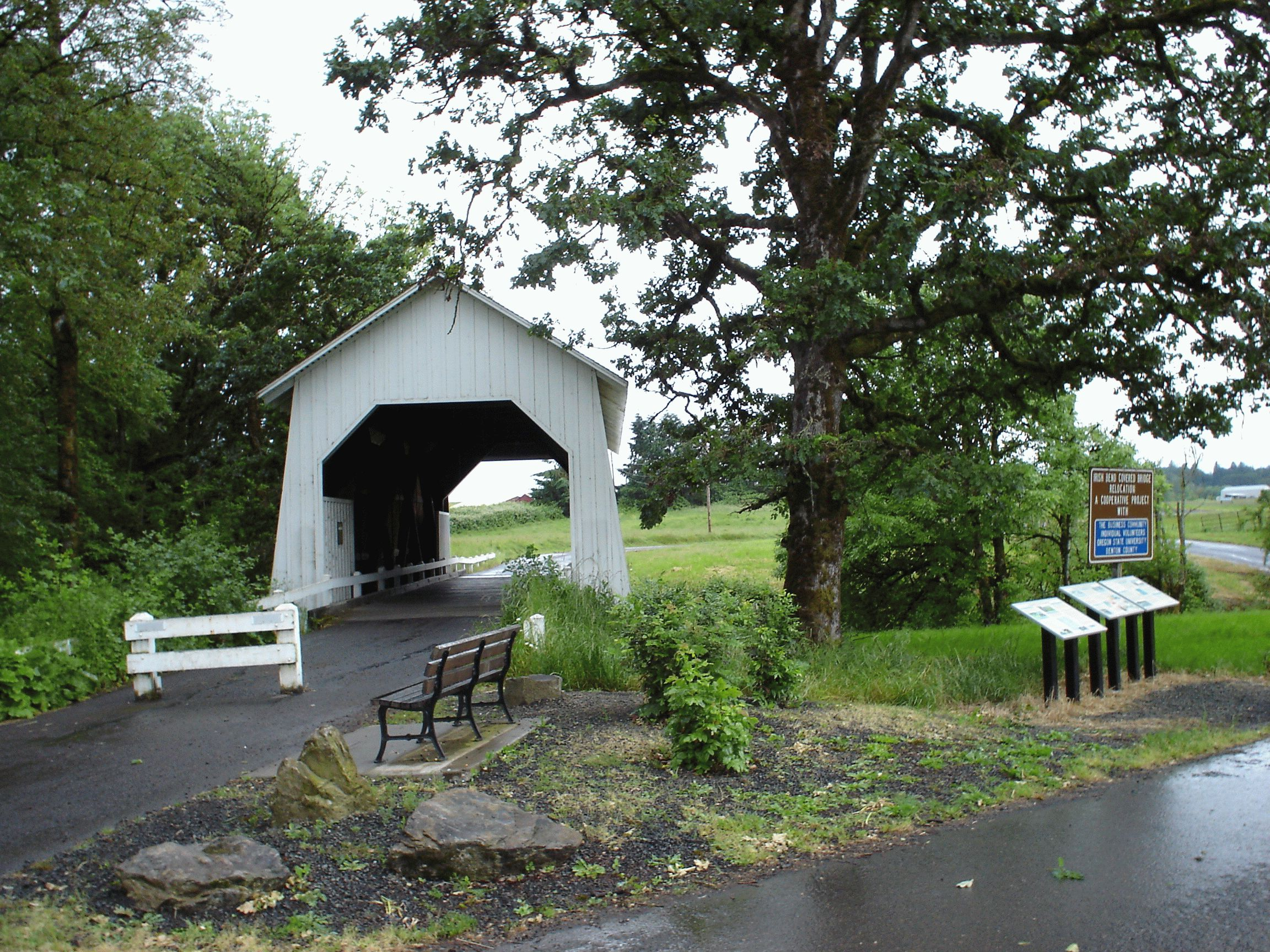
- Irish Bend Covered Bridge at Oregon State University

- Location of the mouth of Oak Creek in Oregon
- Etymology: For the Oregon white oak, a common local species

Location
- Country: United States
- State: Oregon
- County: Benton

Physical characteristics
- Source: Cardwell Hills
  - coordinates: 44°37′59″N 123°20′30″W
  - elevation: 1,715 ft (523 m)
- Mouth: Marys River
  - location: Corvallis
  - coordinates: 44°33′17″N 123°16′41″W
  - elevation: 203 ft (62 m)
- Length: 3.5 mi (5.6 km)
- Basin size: 13 sq mi (34 km^{2})

Oak Creek is a tributary, about 3.5 miles (5.6 km) long, of Marys River in Benton County in the U.S. state of Oregon. The stream descends from forested hills north of Corvallis through the northwest part of the city and across the campus of Oregon State University.

== Course ==
Beginning in the Cardwell Hills northwest of Corvallis, the creek flows generally south through the McDonald State Forest to near Bald Hill. It then flows southeast through the west side of the city and the Oregon State University campus to enter the river near Reser Stadium and Avery Park. It passes under U.S. Route 20, concurrent here with Oregon Route 34, between the stadium and Marys River, about 1 mile (1.6 km) from its confluence with the Willamette River.

The creek is about 3.5 miles (5.6 km) long. Its flow is altered by two dams, one in the forest and one on the university campus. Named tributaries of Oak Creek from source to mouth are Alder, Skunk, and Mulkey creeks and a more recent addition, Lamprey Creek, closest to the mouth. The total length of the main stem plus tributaries is about 8 miles (13 km).

== Watershed ==
The Oak Creek watershed covers about 13 square miles (34 km^{2}) of which about 450 acres (180 ha), or 5.5 percent is paved. The university manages about 40 percent of the basin, some of it on campus near the mouth and some in the forest along the upper reaches.

== History ==
Patricia Benner of the Department of Fisheries and Wildlife at Oregon State University, in a 1984 study of historic changes to Oak Creek, cited evidence of the one-time existence of three lumber mills on the upper reaches of the main stem and its tributaries and a carding mill along the lower main stem. The mills likely involved artificial dams, which blocked fish passage, and holding ponds and at least one flume, and these altered the stream flow and temperature. Along the lower reaches, there is evidence of channelization and in-fill of marshy areas. Although the stream course remains essentially the same as in the 19th century, the stream is less braided and its riparian zones less vegetated and more paved, all of which affect the fish and other organisms in the Oak Creek watershed.

== Flora and fauna ==
Second-growth forest dominates the land near the headwaters. Species include shrubs, red alder, and big leaf maple near the creek and its tributaries. Douglas fir and grand fir as well as oak, madrone, and Pacific yew grow on the ridge tops and hill slopes.

Bald Hill Natural Area, 588-acre (238 ha) along Mulkey Creek, was maintained as savanna by the Kalapuya people before early settlers, the Mulkey brothers, homesteaded here in 1845 and began farming. In 2013, the Greenbelt Land Trust bought the property, which consists of forest—including Oregon white oak on the higher ground—marshy savanna, braided stream channels and beaver ponds. The Trust, a conservation group concerned with the mid-Willamette Valley, is restoring damaged wildlife habitat while using the property for food production, hiking trails, and education.

In the 21st century, the stream supports populations of cutthroat trout. It also provides overwintering habitat for young Chinook salmon that ascend Marys River. Deer, beaver, and an occasional bear or cougar frequent the forested headwaters.

== Recreation ==
Irish Bend Covered Bridge is a pedestrian bridge that spans Oak Creek on university property. Originally a bridge over Willamette Slough near Monroe, it was moved to Oak Creek in 1989. The bridge is listed on the National Register of Historic Places.

Oak Creek Trail, part of the Bald Hill Farm and Bald Hill Natural Area Trail System, runs along the creek for about 0.5 miles (0.8 km) in northwest Corvallis. The trailhead is along Northwest Oak Creek Drive.

== See also ==
- List of rivers of Oregon
