= Lewisburg Hall and Warehouse Company Building =

- U.S. National Register of Historic Places
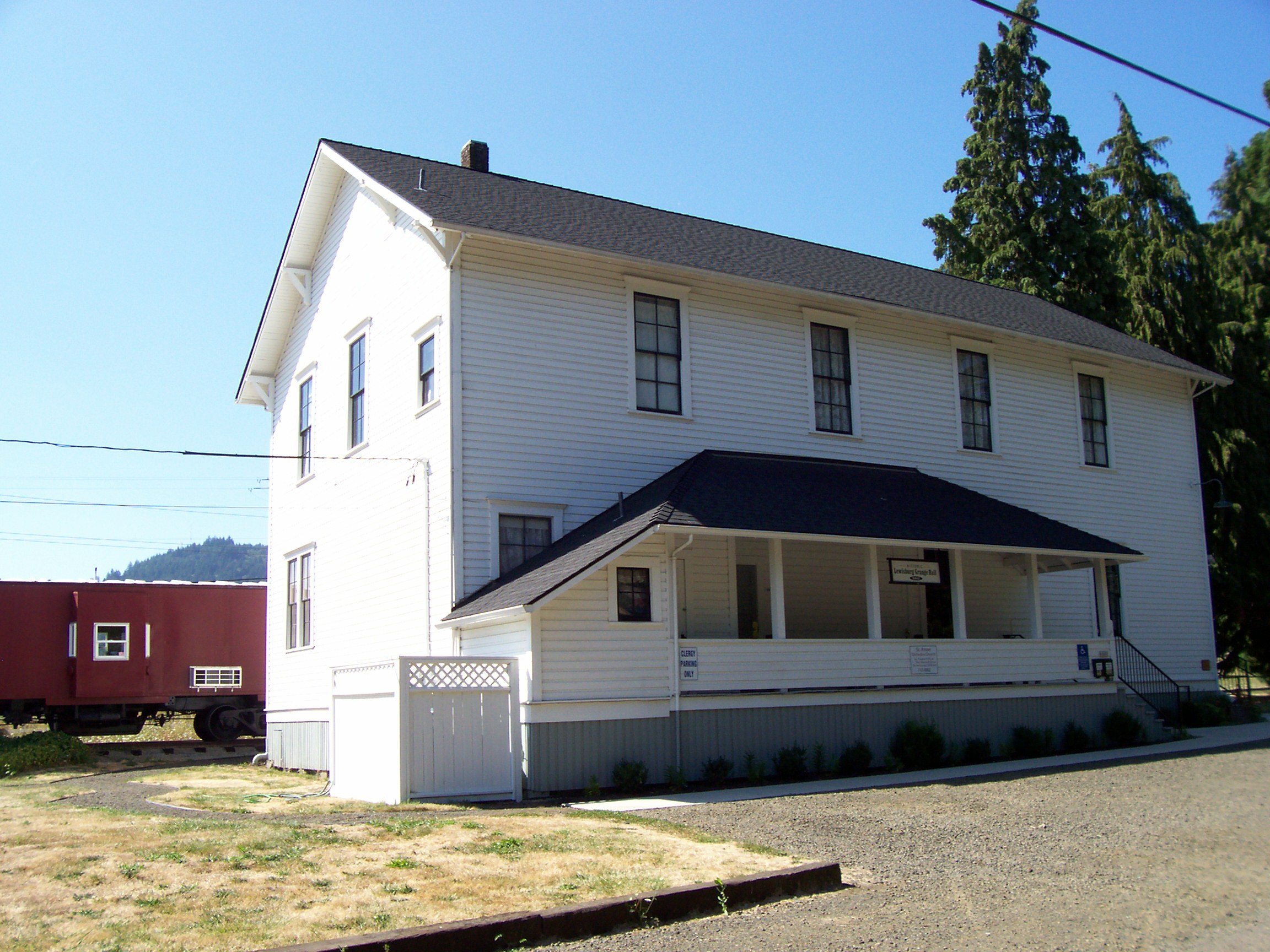
- The building's exterior in 2009

- Location within Oregon Location within the United States
- Location: 6000 NE. Elliott Cir., Corvallis, Oregon
- Coordinates: 44°37′54″N 123°14′21″W
- Area: 0.4 acres (0.16 ha)
- Built: 1911
- Built by: Robert Wiley, John Dodge, Thomas Logsdon, George Mitchell
- NRHP reference No.: 91000804
- Added to NRHP: June 19, 1991

The Lewisburg Hall and Warehouse Company Building is a building located in Lewisburg, Oregon listed on the National Register of Historic Places.

== See also ==
- National Register of Historic Places listings in Benton County, Oregon
