= Albany–Corvallis–Lebanon combined statistical area =

Statistical area in Oregon, US

Coordinates: 44°33′N 123°6′W

The Albany–Corvallis–Lebanon, Oregon Combined Statistical Area (CSA) is a combined statistical area consisting of Oregon's Benton and Linn counties. Benton County is designated as the Corvallis metropolitan statistical area and Linn County is designated as the Albany–Lebanon micropolitan statistical area.

== See also ==
- Oregon statistical areas
