= Meghann Cuniff =

American journalist

Meghann Cuniff (born 1983) is an American legal affairs journalist. She has written for publications including Law.com, and gained prominence for her coverage of Tory Lanez' conviction, for which she received an award from the Los Angeles Press Club. As an independent journalist she publishes work on her website Legal Affairs and Trials.

== Career ==
Cuniff's first professional journalism job was as an education reporter in Coeur d’Alene, Idaho for the Spokesman-Review before moving on to be a crime reporter for the outlet in Spokane, Washington. In 2013 Cuniff took a position at the Orange County Register. After being laid off, she began to work in legal journalism, first for the Los Angeles Daily Journal, and then at Law.com. Next, she was the Senior West Coast Correspondent for Law & Crime.

She gained prominence while reporting on the trial of Tory Lanez, who was convicted for shooting Megan Thee Stallion, which was the most highly publicized case she had ever covered. Her Twitter threads about the case regularly went viral and grew her social media following. She claims that her goal with her social media threads is to help people understand complicated court cases.

Cuniff is a freelance journalist. She covers a variety of legal cases, and began covering those involving the entertainment industry while working for Law & Crime. She reported on cases such as Young Thug's RICO case, the Harvey Weinsten trial, and broke the news about Ashton Kutcher and Mila Kunis writing letters of support for convicted felon Danny Masterson. The majority of her legal coverage centers federal white-collar crime cases. She publishes coverage to her website Legal Affairs and Trials with Meghann Cuniff.

She has appeared as a commentator on Nancy Grace, 48 Hours, and Snapped.

== Personal life ==
Cuniff was raised in Corvallis, Oregon. Her father, David Cuniff, was a lawyer, who died when she was 20. Cuniff's entrance into journalism was as a writer for her high school's newspaper. She attended University of Oregon and there joined the student newspaper The Daily Emerald as a staff reporter.

She resides in southern California.

== Accolades ==
=== 2022 ===
- First place – Los Angeles Press Club, Southern California Journalism Award for Best Use of Social Media to Enhance and/or Cover a Story, Freelance (for "Live Twitter coverage of LA homeless lawsuit court hearings")
- First place – Orange County Press Club Award for Best Pandemic News Story, Los Angeles Times (for “Defending trial ban, federal judge says O.C. state courts aren’t tracking coronavirus infections”)

=== 2023 ===
- First place – Orange County Press Club Award for Best Use of Social Media, Law & Crime (for coverage of Cardi B’s federal civil trial in Orange County)
- First place – Los Angeles Press Club, Southern California Journalism Award for Best Use of Social Media to Enhance and/or Cover a Story by an Independent Journalist, Legal Affairs and Trials with Meghann Cuniff (for "Police and judges behaving badly”)

=== 2024 ===
- First place – Orange County Press Club Award for Best News Story, Dana Point Times (for “2 Trials, 2 Fates: Inside the Dana Point Harbor Murder Case“)
- First place – Los Angeles Press Club, Southern California Journalism Award for Best Use of Social Media to Enhance and/or Cover a Story by an Independent Journalist, LegalAffairsAndTrials.com (for “Twitter/X coverage of Tory Lanez's sentencing for shooting Megan Thee Stallion”)
