= Benton County Courthouse (Oregon) =

- U.S. National Register of Historic Places
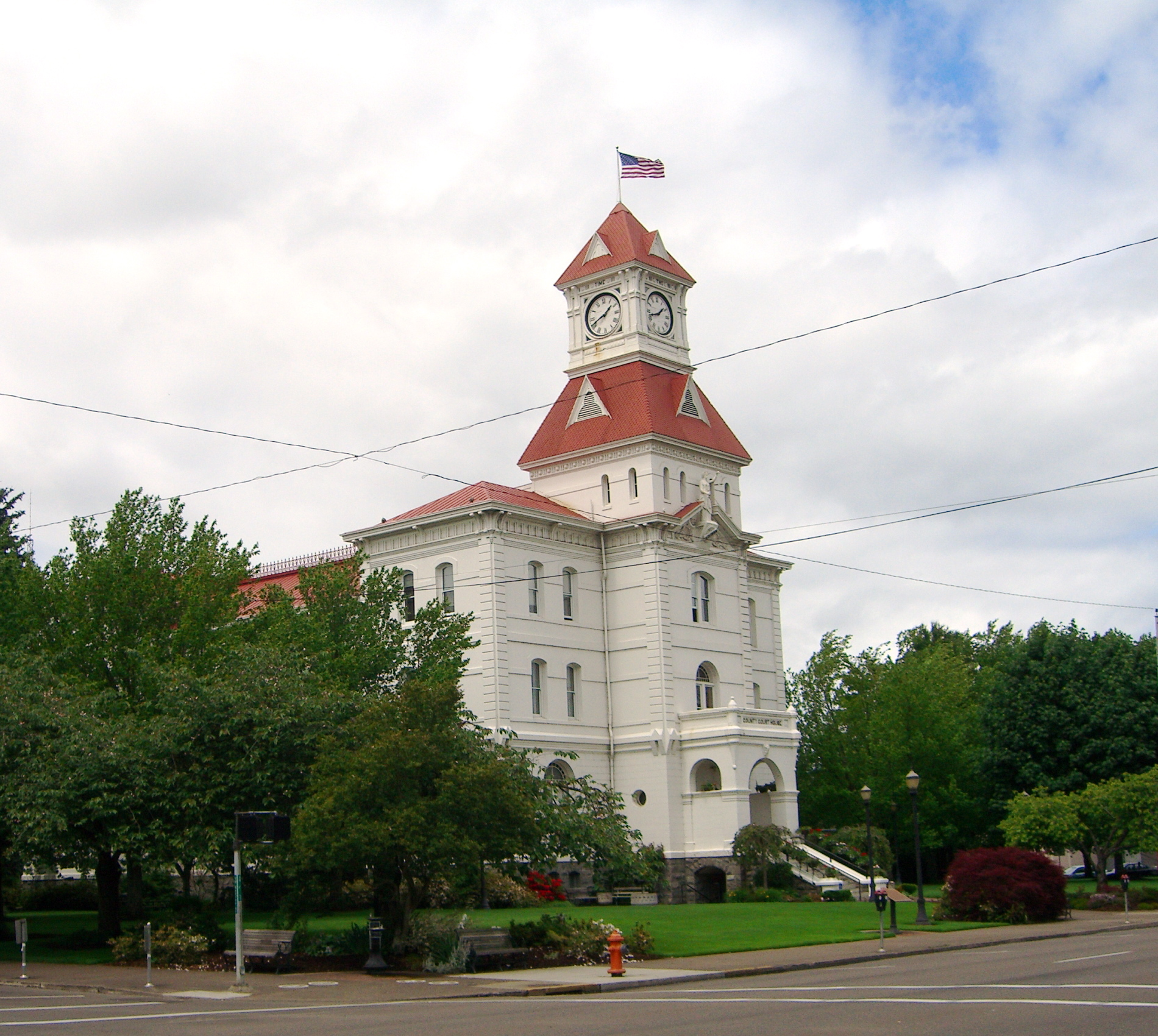
- The building's exterior in 2006

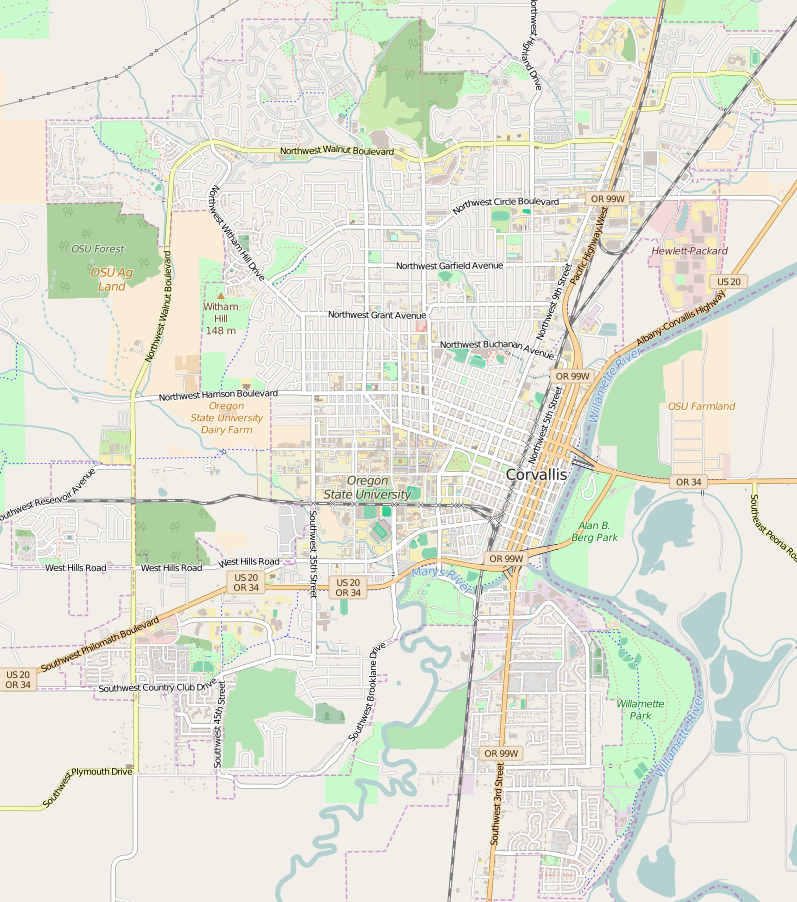
- Location within Corvallis OR Location within Oregon
- Location: NW 4th St. between Jackson and Monroe Sts., Corvallis, Oregon
- Coordinates: 44°33′55″N 123°15′44″W
- Area: 1.3 acres (0.53 ha)
- Built: 1888
- Architect: Delos D. Neer
- Architectural style: Italianate, High Victorian Italianate
- NRHP reference No.: 78002278
- Added to NRHP: January 30, 1978

The Benton County Courthouse is a courthouse building located in Corvallis, Benton County, in the U.S. state of Oregon. Built in 1888, the facility is regarded as the oldest county courthouse in Oregon still being used for its original purpose. It is listed on the National Register of Historic Places.

== History ==
=== Construction ===
The Benton Country Courthouse building includes a basement and four stories of functional rooms, housing county government offices and functioning court rooms.

From the time of its construction in 1888, the spire of the courthouse has housed a gigantic clock, visible from four sides. Until 1953 the clock had to be wound by hand twice a week by a building custodian who climbed into the tower to manually raise the 650 pounds of weights which kept the device in operation. This process was modernized in 1953, when a small electric motor was installed to automate the process of raising the clock weights.

=== Building purposes ===
The basement of the courthouse has long housed the Benton County Elections Department, which under state law retained and stored ballot boxes and original ballots between one local election and the next.

=== 1918 heating reconstruction ===
By 1918 the original steam heating system had begun to fail after 30 years of use. Bids were taken and in August 1918 a contract was signed with a local plumbing firm for the installation of a completely new hot water heating system was installed based on the what was then new Durham system of threaded pipe and cast iron fittings. Only the original boiler was retained as part of the heating modification, which was completed that same fall.

=== 1954 building remodel ===
In 1954 the courthouse underwent a major remodeling, in which the large circuit courtroom was split in half, to form a new district courtroom, a judges' office, and a 182-square foot conference room. The orientation of the circuit courtroom was changed from east and west to north and south in its remodeled form and the ceiling was lowered by one-third, to a height of 16 feet. The newly remodeled 35-by-50 foot room is said to have retained much of its large feel, making use of mahogany plywood and a light green color scheme.

The 1954 makeover was also used to eliminate some 20 brass spittoons which had adorned the courthouse's hallways and offices since its original construction. These were replaced with four modern sand urns for the disposal of cigarette butts.

== See also ==
- National Register of Historic Places listings in Benton County, Oregon
