= Irish Bend Covered Bridge =

Covered bridge in Oregon, US

- Irish Bend Covered Bridge No. 14169
- U.S. National Register of Historic Places
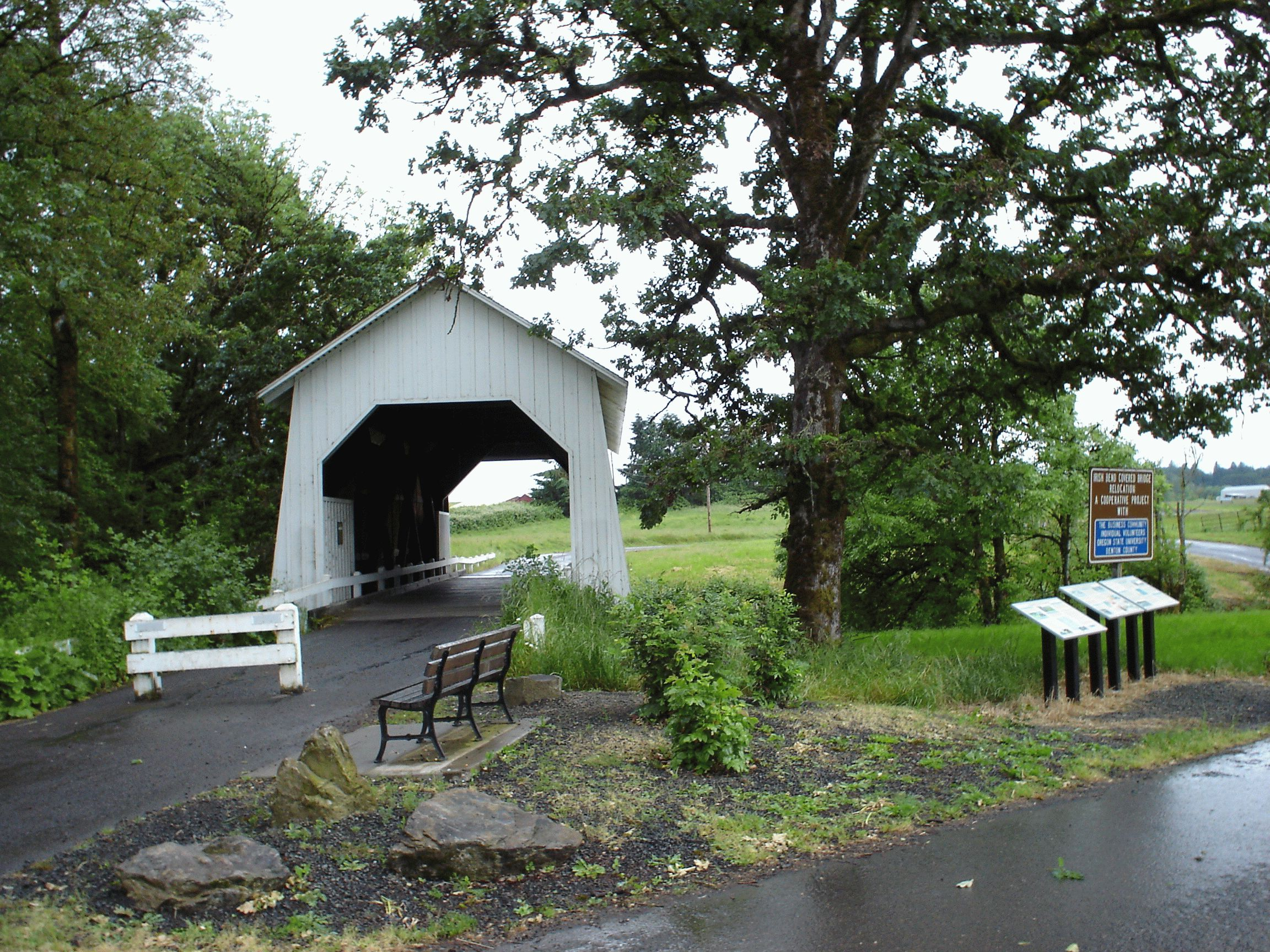
- The Irish Bend Covered Bridge in 2005
- Nearest city: Corvallis, Oregon
- Coordinates: 44°34′00″N 123°18′03″W
- Built: 1954
- Architectural style: Howe truss
- MPS: Oregon Covered Bridges TR
- NRHP reference No.: 13000117 (previously 79002039)

Significant dates
- First listed on NRHP: November 29, 1979
- First de-listed: May 15, 1989
- Re-listed: March 27, 2013

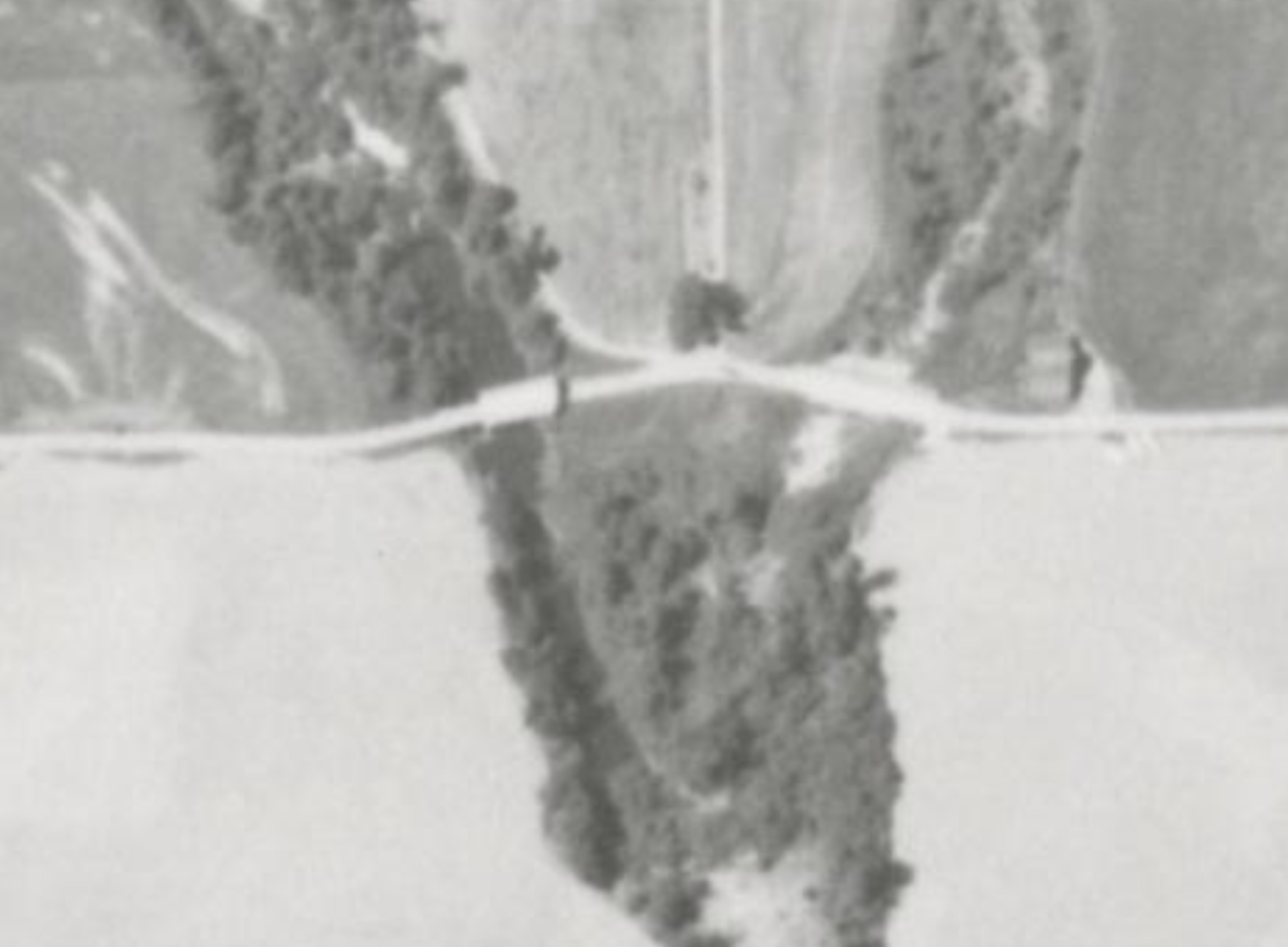
Irish Bend Covered Bridge at original location

Irish Bend Covered Bridge is a wooden covered bridge near Corvallis, Oregon, United States. It was constructed in 1954 and originally spanned a slough of the Willamette River on Irish Bend Road near Monroe. However, in 1975 Irish Bend Road was realigned and the bridge fell into a state of disrepair. The bridge was added to the National Register of Historic Places in 1979. It was eventually dismantled in 1988 to make way for a more modern concrete span. Through negotiations with Benton County and Oregon State University (OSU), an agreement was reached to reconstruct the bridge on university property. $30,000 was raised by the Irish Bend Advisory Committee, and Benton County provided an additional $30,000 to fund the project, which was completed in 1989. Due to the relocation, the bridge was removed from the National Register in 1989. It was relisted in 2013.

Today, the bridge is part of a path through the research farm between 35th and 53rd Streets on the west side of the OSU campus, spanning Oak Creek. Although the property is owned by the university, maintenance is carried out by the Benton County Parks Department.

== See also ==
- List of bridges on the National Register of Historic Places in Oregon
- List of Oregon covered bridges
