= Fitton Green Natural Area =

Park in Oregon, United States

Coordinates: 44°34′44″N 123°22′22″W

Fitton Green Natural Area is a 308-acre county park in Benton County, Oregon, United States near the Marys River about 4 miles north of Philomath. It opened in 2003.

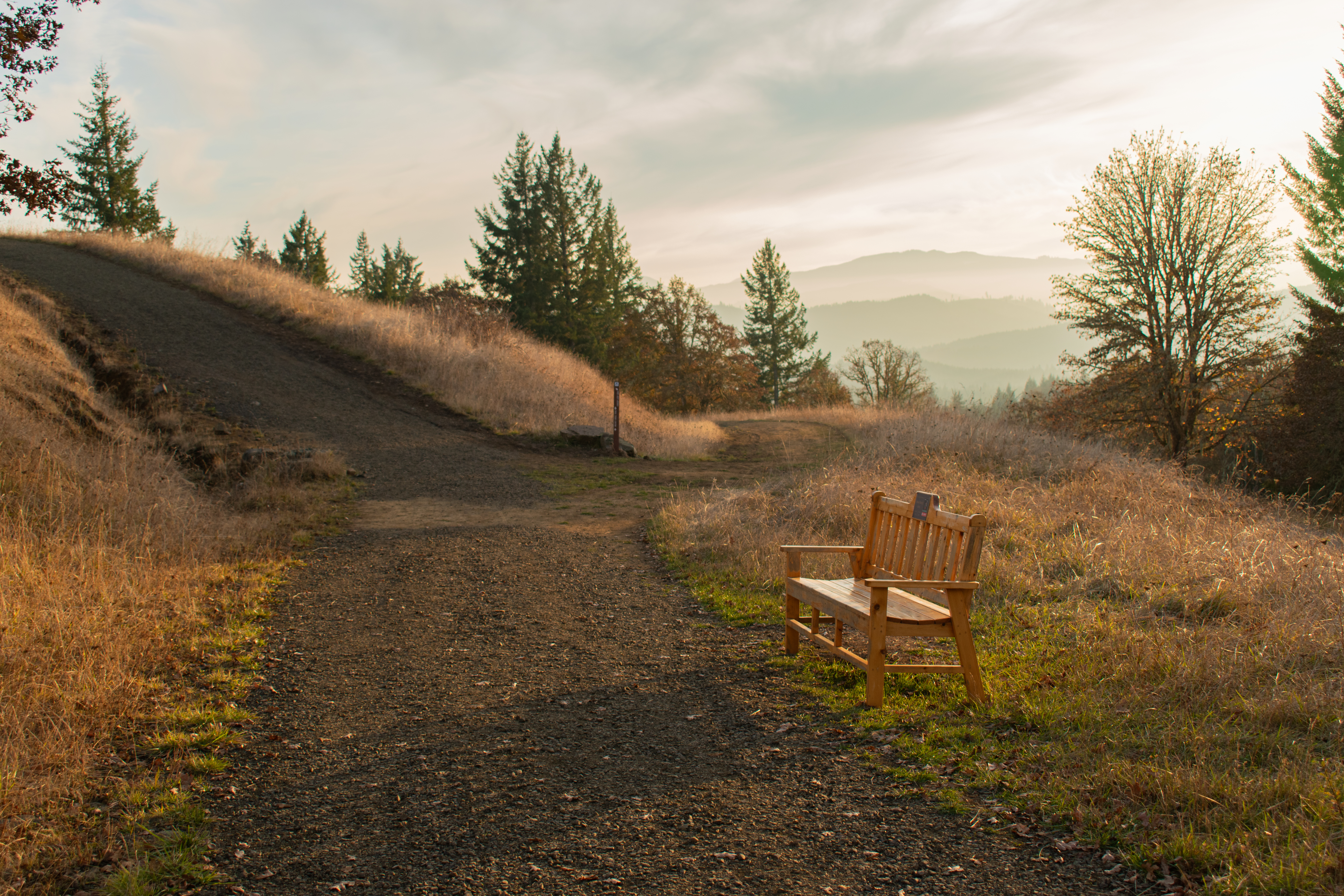
Bench along trail in Fitton Green Natural Area.

== History ==
The park was named after Elsie Fitton Ross, who helped fund the acquisition of the parkland along with her husband Charles Ross, in partnership with the Greenbelt Land Trust. The initial land was acquired in 1988 with funding assistance from the Rosses, who were the founders of the Greenbelt Land Trust. Over the next 10 years the park's landbase continued to grow to its current size. The land trust works in partnership with Benton County's Natural Areas and Parks division to manage the property, and retains a 143-acre conservation easement.

== Geography and vegetation ==
Fitton Green is located in the Central Oregon Coast Range foothills. The park comprises several forest types, including Douglas fir, mixed riparian forest, oak woodland, oak savanna, Bigleaf maple groves, old-growth forest remnants, managed conifers and tree plantations, and rare upland prairie, which supports a population of the endangered Taylor's checkerspot butterfly.

== See also ==
- Cardwell Hills
- Wren, Oregon
