= Lewisburg, Oregon =

Unincorporated community in the state of Oregon, United States

Coordinates: 44°37′44″N 123°14′29″W

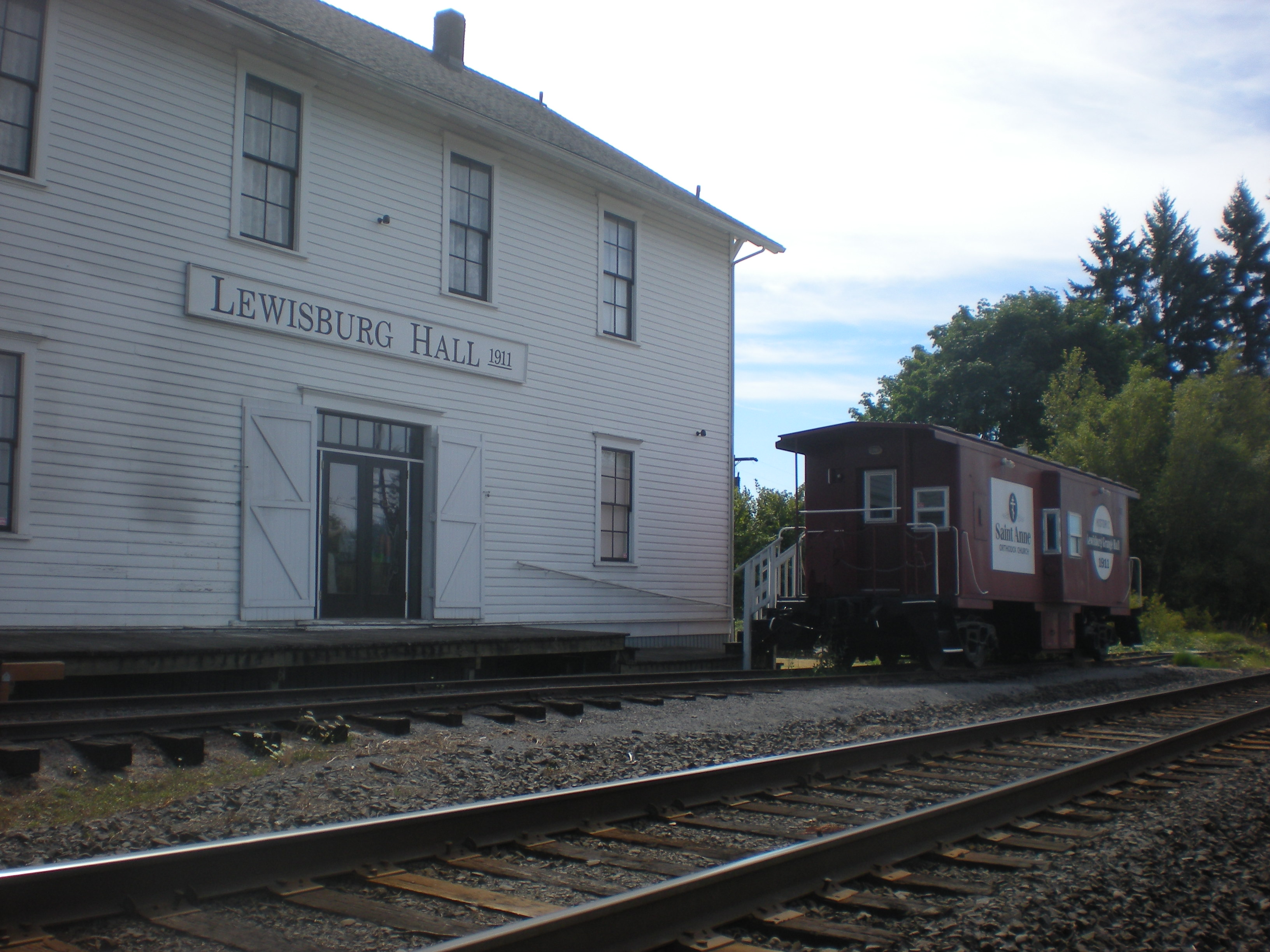
Historic Lewisburg Grange Hall, Built in 1911

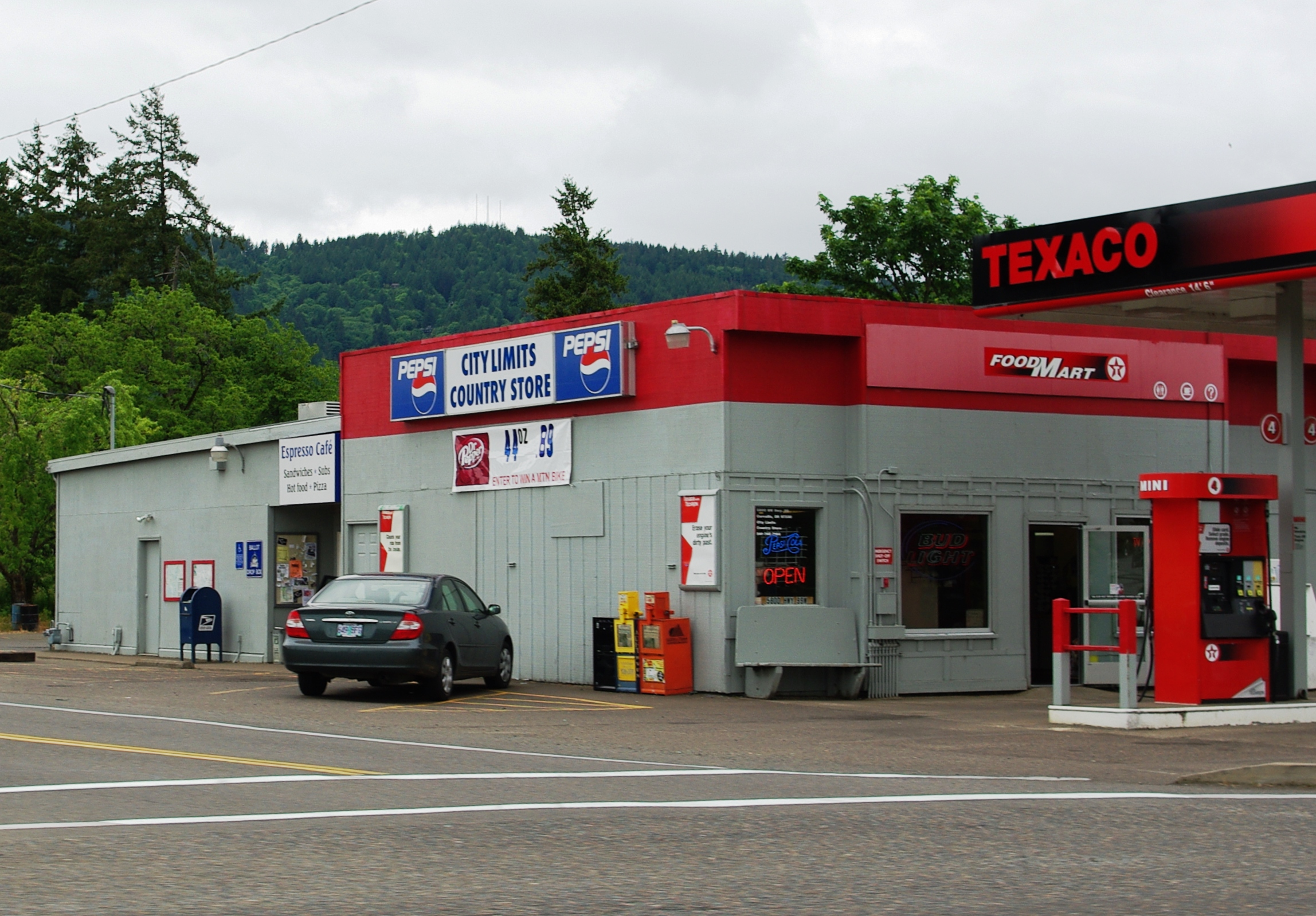
Gas station in the community along 99W

Lewisburg is an unincorporated community in Benton County, Oregon, United States. The center of Lewisburg lies at the intersection of Oregon Route 99W and Lewisburg Avenue at the northeastern corner of Corvallis. As of 2020 it has a population of 569. It is located south of Adair Village and west of Albany.

The 1911 Lewisburg Hall and Warehouse Company Building, listed on the National Register of Historic Places, is located in the community. The building is also known as "Mountain View Grange No. 429". It is currently used as an Eastern Orthodox church, and special events center.
