= Cardwell Hills =

Mountain range in Benton County, Oregon, United States

- Location within Oregon

Highest point
- Elevation: 595 m (1,952 ft)

Geography
- Country: United States
- State: Oregon
- District: Benton County
- Range coordinates: 44°38′34.432″N 123°22′24.366″W
- Topo map: USGS Airlie South

The Cardwell Hills are a mountain range in Benton County, Oregon.
