= Pilgrim (automobile) =

Defunct American motor vehicle manufacturer

Two brass era companies used the Pilgrim marque for their automobiles between 1913 and 1918.

== Pilgrim - 1913–1914, New Albany, Indiana ==
Ferdinand Kahler was the owner of the New Albany Woodworking and Furniture Company which had produced bodies for the Jonz automobile, and when the Jonz New Albany, Indiana factory closed, Kahler was stuck with a stockpile of bodies. To protect his investment, Kahler bought the Jonz equipment and moved into its factory. He organized the Ohio Falls Motor Car Company, and selected Pilgrim as the name for his car. He secured 44-50-hp four-cylinder engines from Continental, which he mounted in a 120-inch wheelbase chassis, and used his Jonz contracted bodies. He advertised "A $2,250 car for $1.800”, and "Buy your automobile direct from our factory”. Very few did.

After selling cars in 1913 and 1914, the Ohio Falls Motor Car Company went into receivership. Kahler sold out to the Crown Motor Car Company of Louisville, Kentucky which moved into the factory in 1914 and reorganized as Hercules.

== Pilgrim - 1915–1918, Detroit, Michigan ==
William Radford an engineer who had worked for Oldsmobile and Hudson, had previously tried the automobile business with the Oxford and Fostoria automobiles. The Pilgrim was an automobile built in Detroit, Michigan, by the Pilgrim Motor Car Company in 1915. The Pilgrim was known as a light car that weighed 1,450 pounds (660 kg). They produced a five-seat touring car, powered by a 2.3-liter, four-cylinder engine that was water-cooled and priced at $685 to $835. C. H. Leete, the company president, was arrested for fraud and William Radford departed the company. Attempts to reorganize the company were only partly successful and very few cars were built before it ceased operations in 1918.
