= Charles and Ibby Whiteside House =

Historic house in Oregon, United States

- U.S. National Register of Historic Places
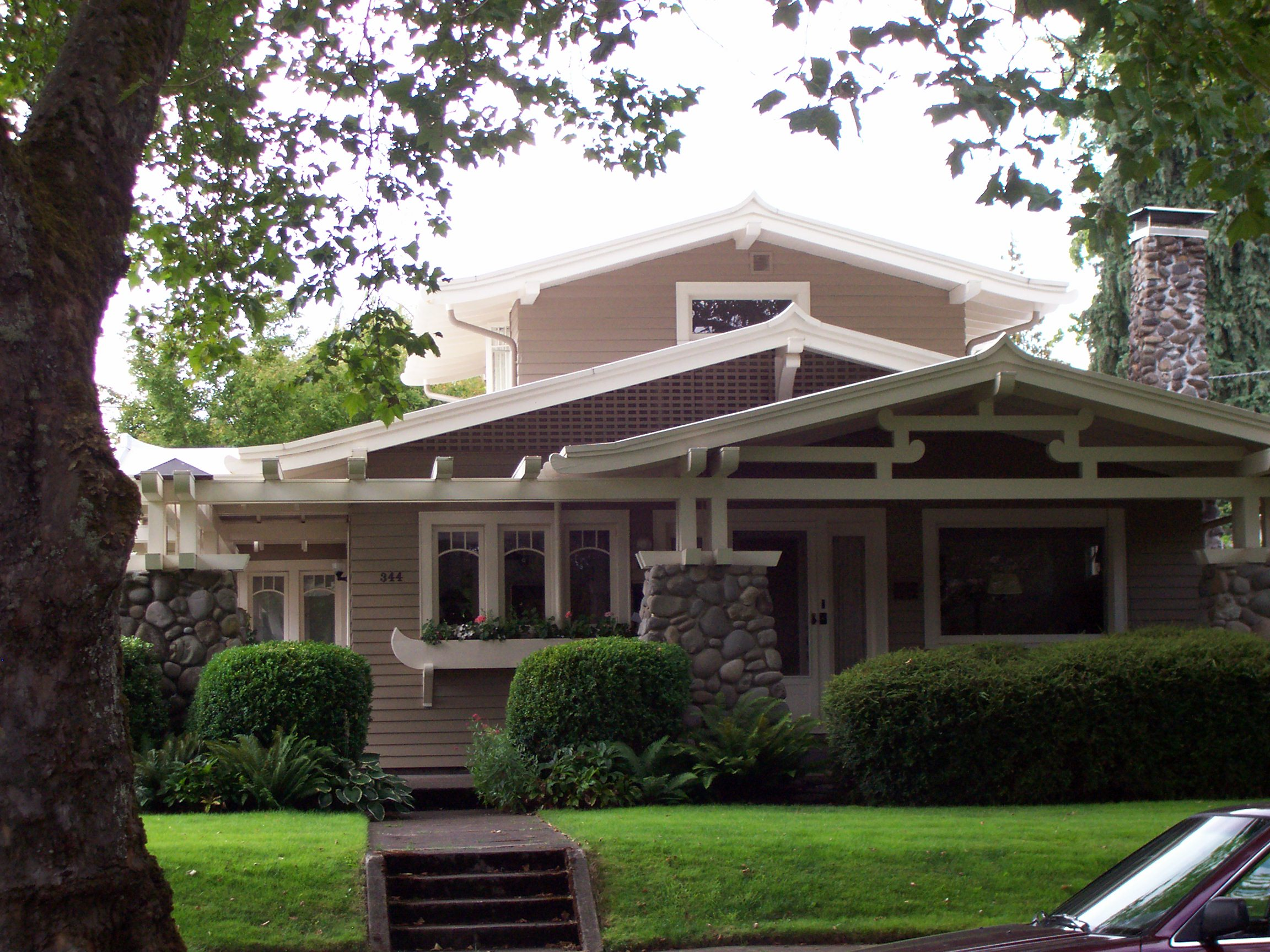
- The Whiteside House in 2009

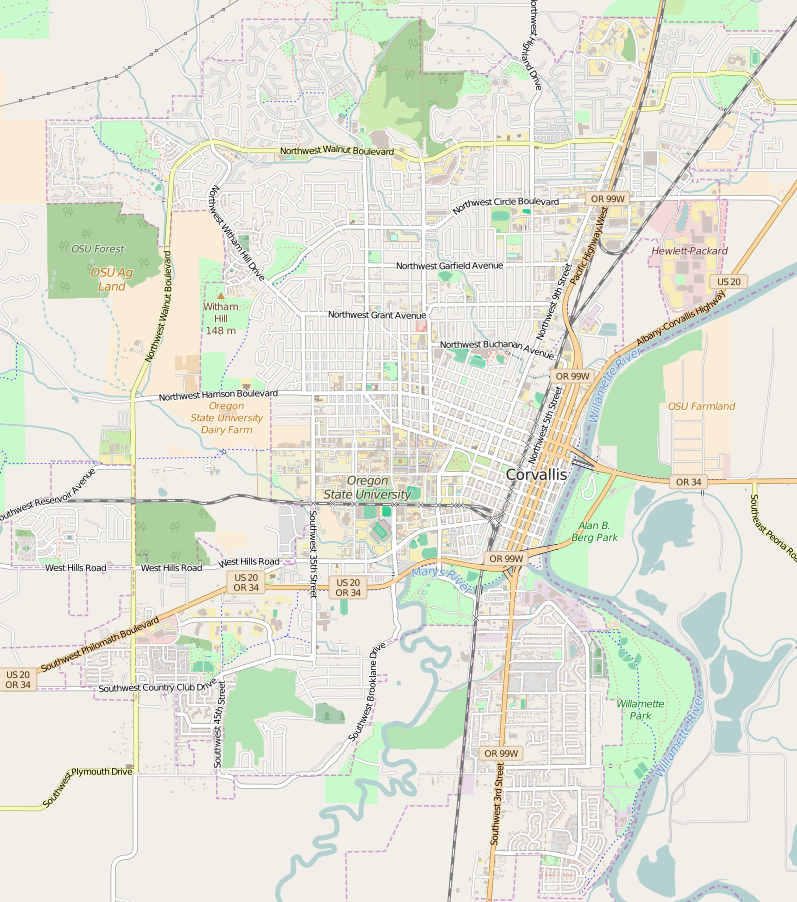
- Location within Corvallis OR Location within Oregon
- Location: 344 SW 7th Street, Corvallis, Oregon
- Coordinates: 44°33′46″N 123°16′01″W
- Area: Less than 1 acre (0.40 ha)
- Built: 1922
- Architectural style: Airplane Bungalow
- NRHP reference No.: 07000774
- Added to NRHP: August 2, 2007

The Charles and Ibby Whiteside House is a historic house in Corvallis, Oregon, United States. Built from plan books in 1922 during a period of rapid growth in Corvallis, it is an excellent example of an airplane bungalow, and probably the only house of that style ever constructed in the city. It was added to the National Register of Historic Places in 2007.

== See also ==
- National Register of Historic Places listings in Benton County, Oregon
- Whiteside Theatre
