= Melrose Heights–Oak Lawn–Fairview Historic District =

Historic district in South Carolina, United States

- U.S. National Register of Historic Places
- U.S. Historic district
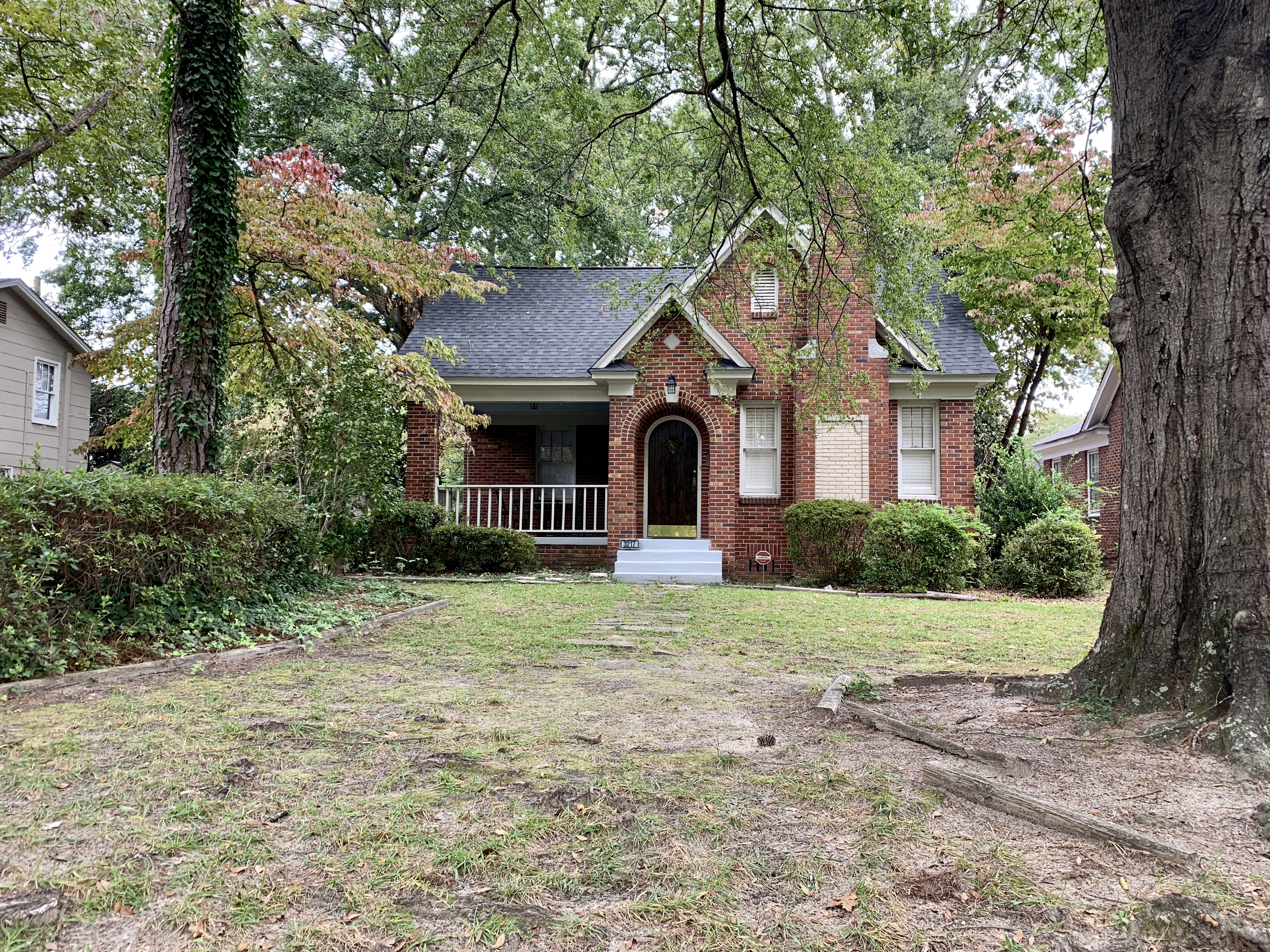

- Location within South Carolina Location within the United States
- Location: Bounded by Butler and Princeton Sts., Maiden Ln., Michigan St. and Millwood Ave., Woodrow and King Sts., Kirby St., Trenholm Rd., Columbia, South Carolina
- Coordinates: 34°0′19″N 80°59′48″W
- Area: 155 acres (63 ha)
- Built: 1900
- NRHP reference No.: 16000756
- Added to NRHP: November 2, 2016

The Melrose Heights–Oak Lawn–Fairview Historic District is a predominantly residential historic district in eastern Columbia, South Carolina. It encompasses much of the neighborhood of Melrose Heights, and is formed out of three separate subdivisions that were developed as a streetcar suburb originally outside the city boundary in the first half of the 20th century. The district is about 155 acres (63 ha) in size, and has 607 contributing buildings, in many architectural styles popular in the first half of the 20th century. It is bounded on the east by Woodrow Street, the north by Gervais Street and Trenholm Road, the south by Millwood Avenue and Michigan Street, and the east by Butler and Princeton Streets and Maiden Lane. The area was originally farmland owned by members of the locally prominent Powell family. Although it features modest houses in a wide variety of styles, it has a particular concentration of "airplane" bungalow cottages.

The district was added to the National Register of Historic Places in 2016.

== See also ==
- National Register of Historic Places listings in Columbia, South Carolina
