= Ferdinand N. Kahler =

American inventor (1864–1927)

Ferdinand N. "Ferd" Kahler, Sr.
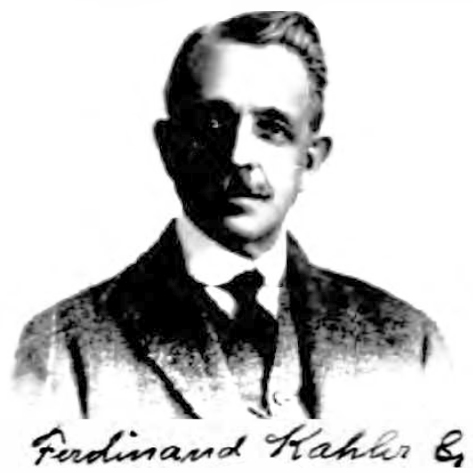
- Born: Ferdinand Kahler; November 20, 1864; Hermsdorf, Bohemia, Austrian Empire
- Died: November 14, 1927 (aged 62); New Albany, Indiana, United States
- Occupations: Inventor, entrepreneur

Ferdinand Nickolas Kahler Sr. (November 20, 1864 – November 14, 1927) was an American inventor, entrepreneur and automobile pioneer who founded the Kahler Co. in New Albany, Indiana.

He was a manufacturer of wood and lumber products, founded two early American automobile companies and was granted patents by the United States Patent and Trademark Office for his inventions.

== Biography ==
Ferdinand Nickolas 'Ferd' Kahler Sr. was born November 20, 1864, at Hermsdorf, Bohemia, Austrian Empire (now Heřmánkovice, Česko). The first of Anton and Genowefa “Genevieve” (née Scholz) Kahler's five children, Kahler was baptized Catholic the next day.

At age 17, he immigrated to New York City, arriving on September 10, 1881, on the passenger ship SS Elbe. He traveled to Reading, Pennsylvania, visited Louisville, Kentucky, and moved to nearby New Albany, Indiana in 1884. Kahler's family followed him to New Albany five years later. Kahler married Mary Mathilde (née Leist) in New Albany, Indiana at St. Mark's Evangelical Church in New Albany on May 11, 1868.

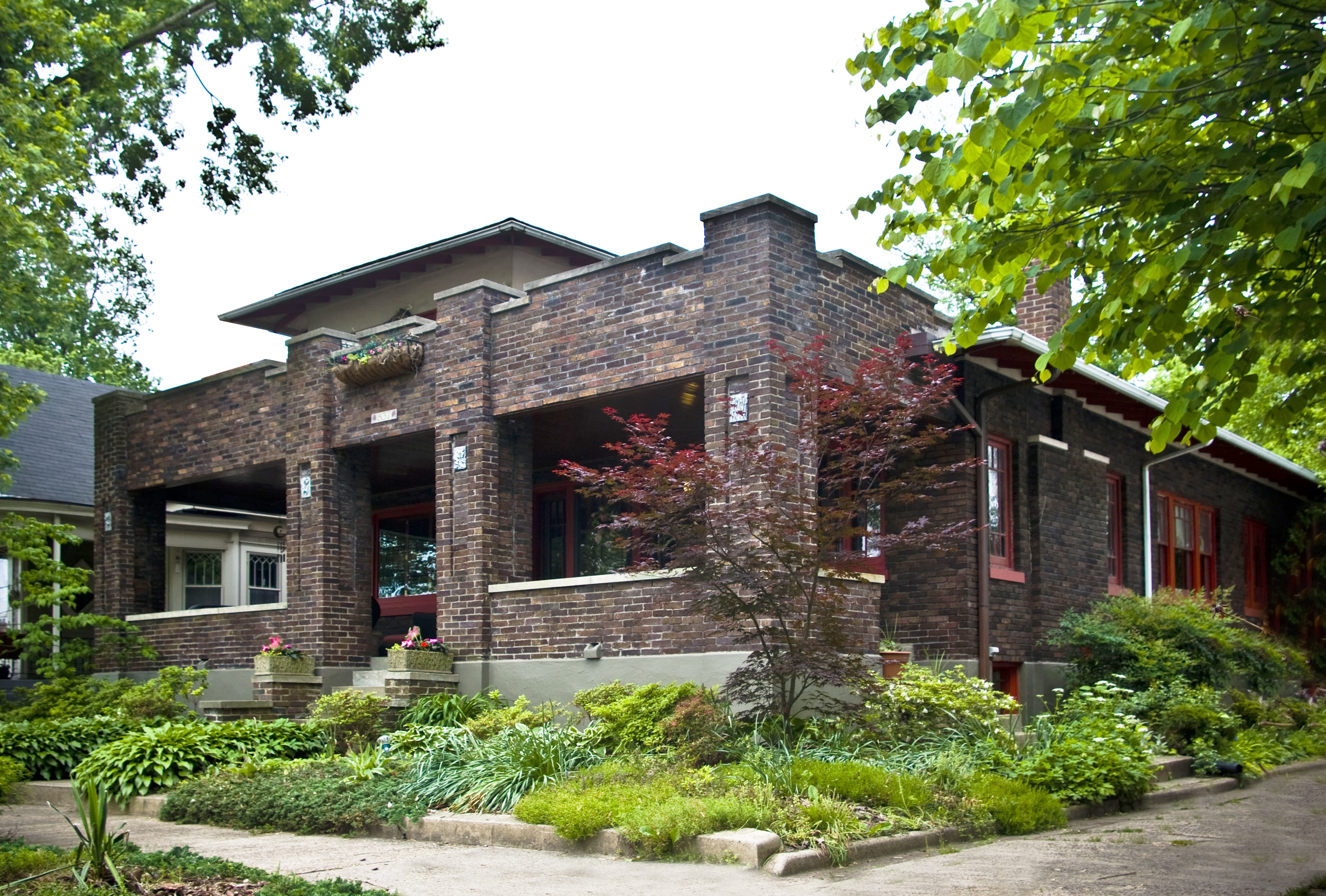
The Ferdinand N. Kahler home built in the Airplane Bungalow style on Cedar Bough Place, a private street in New Albany, Indiana

Kahler built the last home constructed on Cedar Bough Place, after purchasing the two lots in 1901. In October, 1919 he obtained a building permit for "a bungalow in Cedar Bough". His home was built in the Airplane Bungalow style of American Craftsman architecture. In 2008 the house was listed on the National Register of Historic Places (along with every house on the street). In 2011, the Kahler home earned a New Albany Historic Preservation Commission "Facelift Award" for "outstanding restoration and rehabilitation".

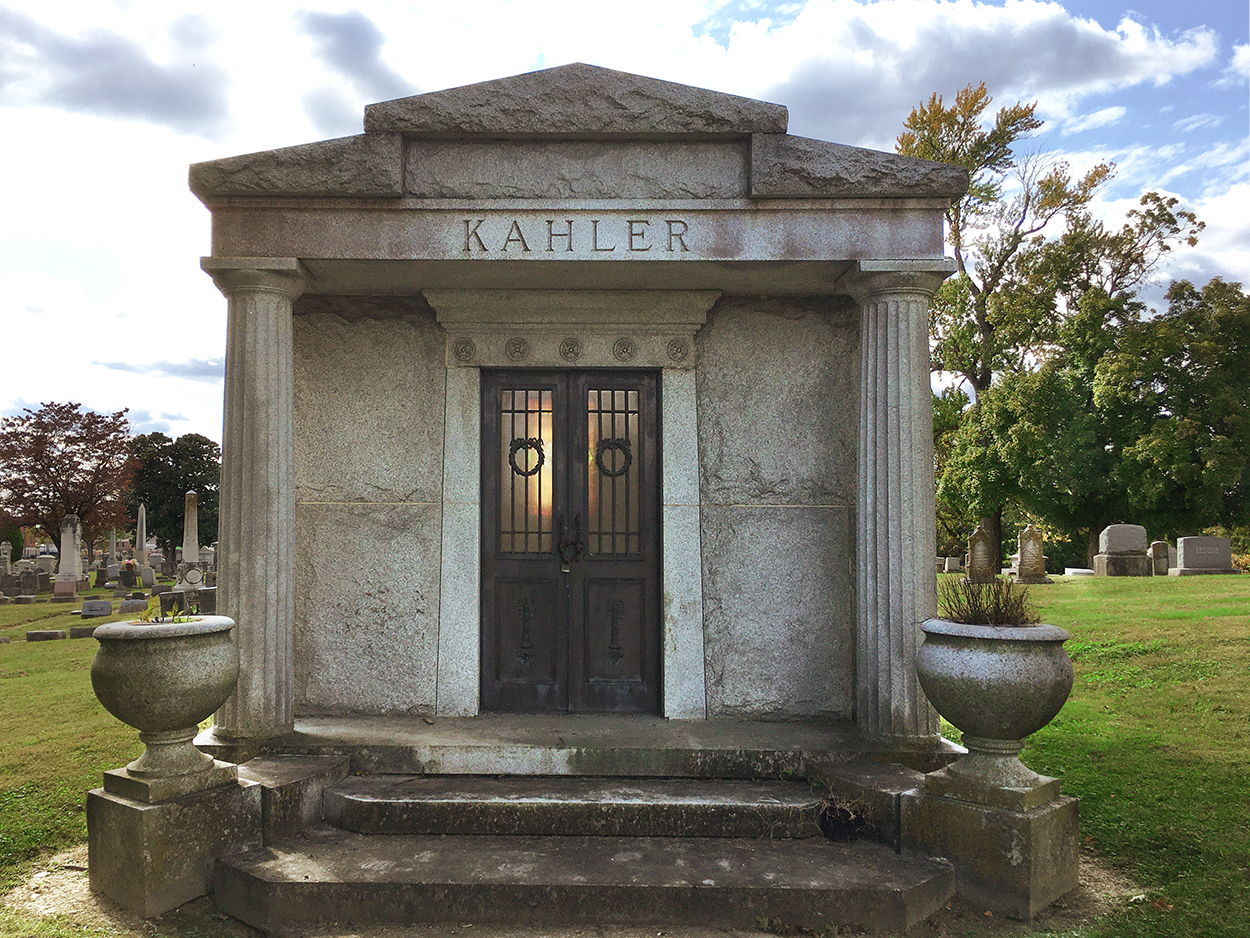
The Kahler family vault in Fairview Cemetery, New Albany, Indiana

Kahler was naturalized a U.S. citizen on June 23, 1921.

Kahler died on November 14, 1927, was buried in the City Vault on November 17, and was reinterred in the Kahler family vault in New Albany's Fairview Cemetery on April 23, 1929. The Kahler family vault was built by the Peter & Burghard Stone Company of Louisville, Kentucky at a cost of $15,000 (equivalent to $278,017 in 2025).

== Early career ==
Kahler began his career as a bench carpenter, building railcars, streetcars, double-deck cars and their interiors at the American Car and Foundry Co. in nearby Jeffersonville, Indiana. Originally the Ohio Falls Car Manufacturing Co., this plant was responsible for most of American Car and Foundry Co.'s considerable interurban car production.

In January 1903, Kahler was one of three founders of the New Albany Table Manufacturing Company, incorporated with a $20,000 (equivalent to $716,667 in 2025) capital investment. In 1904, Kahler was listed as manager and bookkeeper of the Henry Klerner Furniture Co. in the New Albany City Directory. By 1905, he was conducting business as "Ferdinand Kahler & Son", advertising "Woodworking Specialties".

He founded the Kahler Co. in New Albany, Indiana in August, 1907, incorporating with a $5,000 (equivalent to $172,768 in 2025) capitalization. The Articles of Incorporation mention "manufacturing table tops and for doing interior work in residences and offices". The company also manufactured custom wooden case goods, ice boxes, folding tables and other products. Early advertising mentions "store fixtures, saloon fixtures, special furniture and anything in the wood line that has to be made to order".

In 1908, Kahler personally oversaw the installation of laboratory furniture the Kahler Co. manufactured in its New Albany plant for use in the Pittsburgh, Pennsylvania, Omaha, Nebraska and Nashville, Tennessee USDA Bureau of Chemistry food purity testing laboratories. The contracts were awarded several months earlier.

Kahler's success allowed him to build a new factory in New Albany in 1910 on Grant Line Road. It had its own power plant to generate electricity. The plant featured highly efficient direct-geared electric motors at each work station instead of the then-common belt-driven tools powered by overhead shafts. The Kahler Co. plant had its own dry kiln and a long rail siding, allowing both inbound and outbound freight to be handled under cover. The siding was connected to a rail line that carried freight for four railroad companies, allowing Kahler great flexibility in shipping. One reason the factory was considered "one of the model wood working plants in the city" was its "concrete construction".

In 1915, it was reported that Kahler had broken ground at the factory on a two-story addition to double its capacity.

In 1918, the Kahler Co. was awarded a contract by the US Army Quartermaster for 50 wooden saddle stitching horses.

In 1919, Kahler procured a building permit allowing a $5,000 addition (equivalent to $125,649 in 2025) to the Grant Line Road factory.

== Automobile pioneer ==
=== Component manufacturer ===
Kahler's entry in automobile manufacturing started in 1908 with the Kahler Co. providing the wooden frames and wooden body components for many automobile companies. The company successfully filled an early order for 6,000 automobile bodies earning Kahler credibility within the automobile industry.

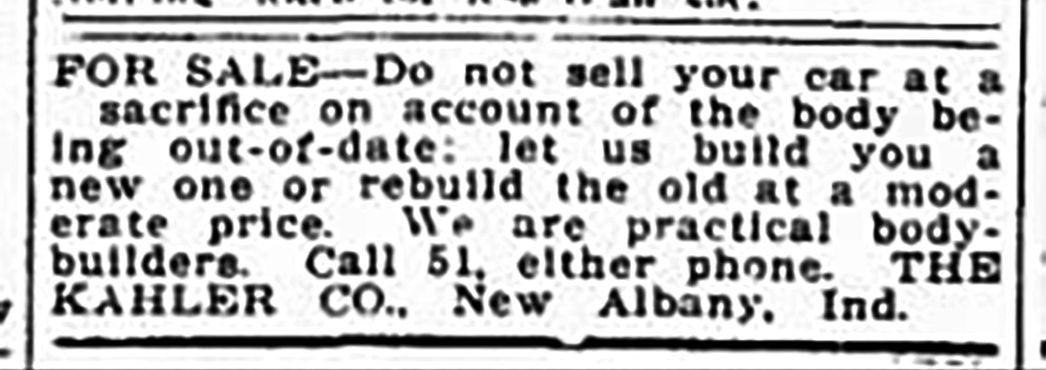
The Kahler Co. classified advertisement in The Courier Journal, Louisville, Kentucky, February 11, 1912

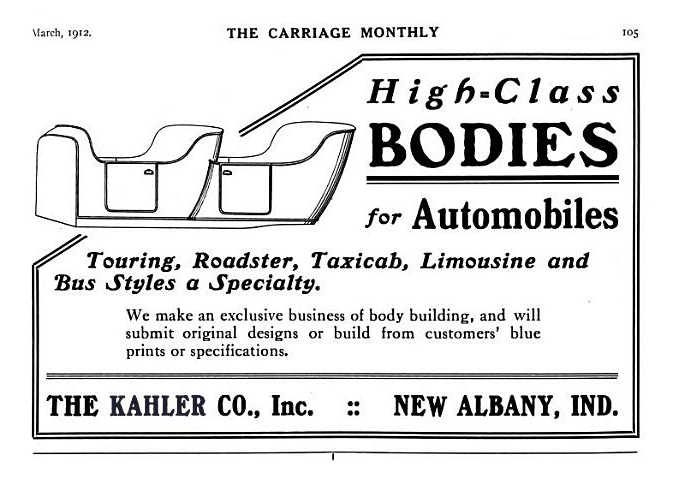
The Kahler Co. Inc. auto body advertisement in The Carriage Monthly, March, 1912

In 1909 it was reported that "The Kahler Co. at Pearl and Oak streets, New Albany, will be operated at its fullest capacity for the next eighteen months, having received a contract from an Eastern automobile factory for a large number of automobile beds". The article claimed thirty men were working 13-hour days to fill the order.

Kahler won a contract from the Clark Motor Car Company of Shelbyville, Indiana, in 1909 to build 125 "small car bodies at $42 each" and "150 large car bodies at $44 each". After delivering the small car bodies, Kahler sent a representative to take measurements for the larger bodies. After a few of the larger bodies had been finished and delivered, the Clark company rejected them and denied that a contract had been negotiated. Kahler became another plaintiff against the company, suing in December 1911 for $6,600 in damages. The case was dismissed in September 1912.

In 1913, Kahler was the largest of seven Indiana based claimants against the Maxwell-Briscoe Motor Co. asking a Federal Court in Indianapolis to judge the company bankrupt so the claimants could be paid by a court-appointed receiver.

=== Component supplier ===
In 1911, the Kahler Co. won a contract to build the frames and other wood components of the American Automobile Manufacturing Company automobile being assembled in New Albany, Indiana. Founded in Kansas CIty, Missouri, in 1908, the American Automobile Manufacturing Company acquired the Jonz Automobile Company of Beatrice, Nebraska. By August 1910, the company had moved its offices to Louisville, Kentucky, and its production across the Ohio River in Indiana, setting up its manufacturing equipment in the idle New Albany Woolen Mills factory. The factory buildings were two and three stories in height, located on a six-acre tract on Vincennes Street in New Albany. The factory was reported in 1914 to be "one of the very largest factories in the state of Indiana... and is equipped with machinery, tools, raw materials, parts and accessories for the manufacture of motor cars".

Promising huge potential profits, the company sold $900,000 (equivalent to $31,098,214 in 2025) worth of stock. and produced a limited number of cars which were marketed as "The Jonz," named after the patented "Jonz 'Tranquil Motor'" developed by the three Jones brothers in Kansas. The American Automobile Manufacturing Company built the two-stroke engine American from 1911 to 1912 in New Albany.

The American Automobile Manufacturing Company was reincorporated as The American Automobile Corp. in Arizona on March 13, 1912, with a capitalization of $500,000.

In September 1912, the company heard a proposal to merge with the Advance Power Company, a Chicago, Illinois, manufacturer of automobile motors and transmission gears. The plans for the merger included changing the company name to "The Advance Motor Car Company" and the production of a 1,000 pound truck with a double-friction drive that was to sell for $400.00. The stockholders voted to leave the decision up to the board of directors.

The company was instead reorganized the third time under the name "New Albany Automobile Corporation". That corporation went bankrupt, and Kahler purchased its assets.

=== American Automobile Manufacturing Company ===
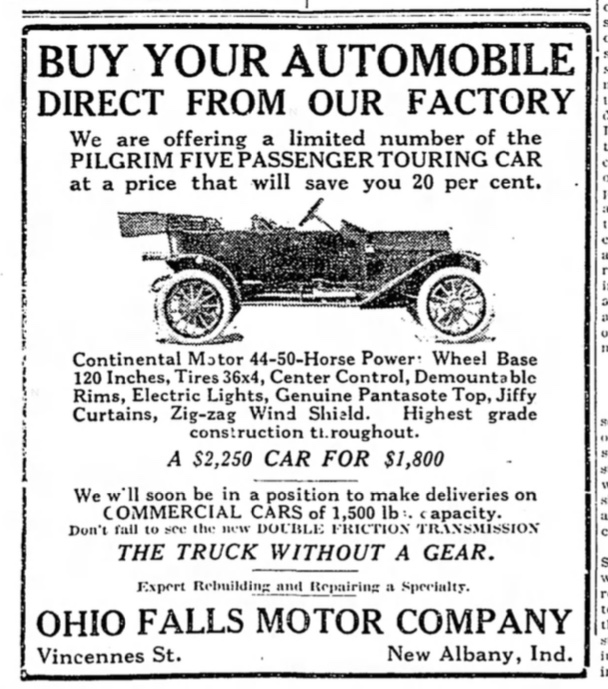
Ad for Ohio Falls Motor Company, New Albany, Indiana, in the Louisville Courier-Journal

In December 1912, Kahler reorganized the company with a capitalization of $450,000 (equivalent to $15,012,931 in 2025), changing the name to Ohio Falls Motor Company, largely to protect the assets of his woodworking business.

In June 1913, the company owed the Kahler Co. $3,102. Kahler petitioned the Floyd County Circuit Court to appoint a receiver while allowing the company to continue production during receivership. A month later the Ohio Falls Motor Company was dissolved and reincorporated by Kahler and three other local businessmen as the Falls City Motor Company. The new corporation was capitalized at $50,000.

Kahler purchased the company in November 1913, paying $1,500 in cash and assuming $25,000 (equivalent to $863,258 in 2025) in outstanding liens against the company. Kahler served as president of the new automobile company as well as president of the Kahler Co.

The Falls City Motor Company turned out two lines of hand-assembled "medium-priced gasoline runabout(s)", the Ohio Falls (1913–1914) and the Pilgrim (1913–1914), which retailed for $1,800 (equivalent to $58,636 in 2025). Total production of the Pilgrim was about 20 completed cars. The Pilgrim retained the unique hexagonal bonnet (hood) and radiator design from the Jonz automobile.

In 1914, the company was declared bankrupt. Kahler, named the receiver of the bankrupt automobile company, closed it and sold the plant for $50,000 (equivalent to $1,607,143 in 2025) to the Crown Motor Car Company (later renamed the Hercules Motor Car Company) headquartered in Louisville. The sale was not without controversy. Two lawsuits were filed, alleging the sale of the plant was "'irregular' because the sale was made without the knowledge or consent of other creditors or stockholders, and the property was sold at $ 11,000 less than fair cash value".

On March 29, 1914, Kahler offered for sale "at less than half of the original cost" the four remaining new Pilgrim "5-passenger touring cars with 44 h.p. Continental engines" and a new "1 1/2 ton panel truck with a 32 h.p. engine". Two new engines with transmissions were offered for sale as well. Kahler also sold the remaining wooden chassis frame material on hand to the Kentucky Wagon Manufacturing Company of Louisville.

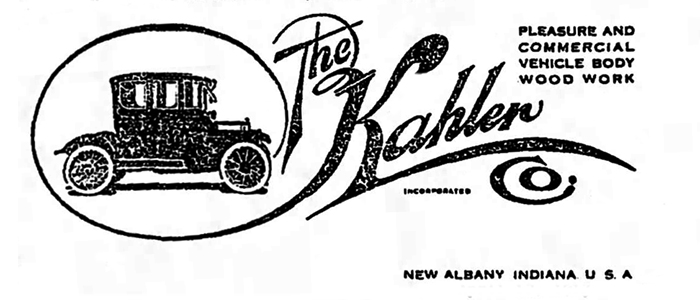
The Kahler Co. Inc. letterhead, The Courier Journal, April 22, 1917

=== Resumption of component production ===
A 1915 Chilton Automobile Directory lists the Kahler Co. as a component manufacturer in multiple categories, including "Dashes - wood, metal bound, veneered and solid, in the white (unfinished) and finished".

In 1922, it was reported that the Kahler Co. had been awarded a contract to produce car bodies for the Durant Star automobile. The Kahler Co. was still listed as a national source of automobile dashboards in 1925.

== Supplier to Ford ==
In 1915, Kahler used his experience gained from manufacturing and assembling automobiles to become one of eight prime wooden component suppliers to the Ford Motor Company of Detroit, Michigan. The Kahler Co. provided Ford with wooden Model T car frames, floor boards, battery boxes and other components. A serial number preceded by the lhe letters "KA" stamped on a Ford Model T's firewall or front frame member indicates the frame assembly was manufactured at the Kahler Co.'s New Albany factory. Regardless of the manufacturer, all Model T bodies were interchangeable, however the individual parts in a body would not necessarily fit a similar-looking body if it was made by a different manufacturer.

It was reported in 1917 that Kahler's contract to produce 200 car bodies a day for Ford was "reputed to be the largest manufacturing order ever received by a New Albany concern". Over $7,500 (equivalent to $502,597 in 2025) was reported to have been spent on new manufacturing equipment to meet the new contract's production.

In April 1920, the US rail system suffered a number of strikes. The resulting rail embargo forced the Kahler Co. to temporarily halt production due to the inability to receive raw materials and make shipments to Ford in Detroit. Kahler's 185 employees were furloughed. On March 30, 1921, Kahler announced his automobile body factory would "resume operations in full force", with an order from the Ford Motor Company for 280 automobile bodies per day.

By 1921, the Kahler Co. was exclusively manufacturing wooden "open body" (without doors) automobile frames and components for the Ford Motor Company, and had an annual production capacity of 93,000 car frames, many shipped directly from the New Albany factory to the Louisville, Kentucky Ford Assembly Plant (then located at Third Street and Eastern Parkway) for use in Model T production.

By 1924, the Kahler Co. was exclusively producing 327,600 Ford roadster car bodies annually at the New Albany factory.

== Factory destroyed and rebuilt ==
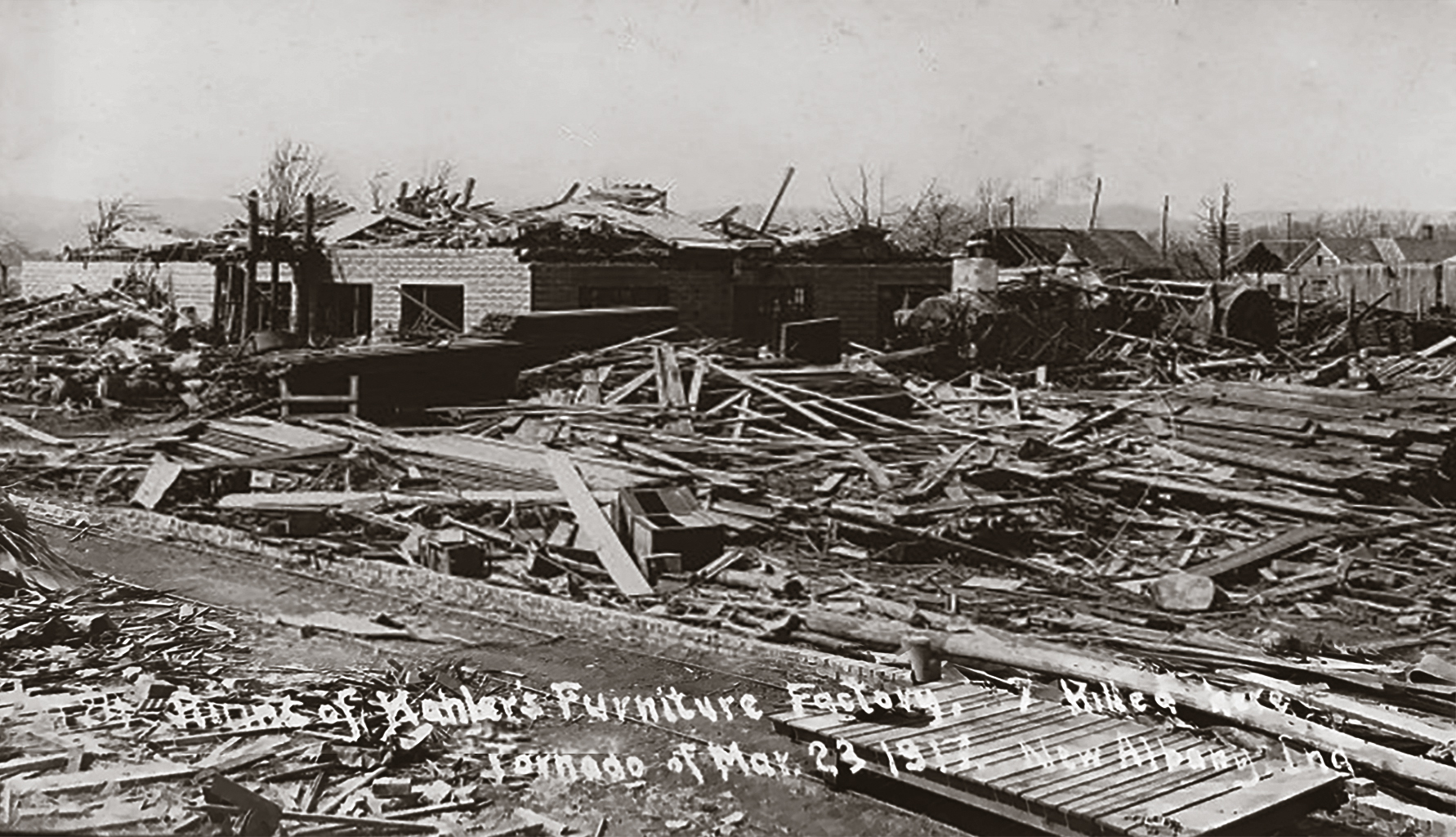
Postcard showing the aftermath of 1917 tornado damage to the Kahler Co., New Albany, Indiana

Kahler's factory, located on the corner of Grant Line Road and Vincennes Street in New Albany was destroyed by a tornado on the afternoon of March 23, 1917. The Kahler Co. buildings were reduced to a mass of twisted wreckage and left almost level with the street. Six employees were killed and 15 were injured. Major D. C. Payton, superintendent of the Indiana Reformatory in Jeffersonville, Indiana offered to transport 100 inmates from the jail to the Kahler Co. factory "to clear away the debris in one day".

Hearing the factory had been destroyed, Michigan cities petitioned Kahler to relocate near Detroit. Kahler decided to remain in New Albany. Hearing he had decided not to relocate, New Albany bankers offered him "on his own terms, all the money he wanted to put him (Kahler) back in business again". His employees were said to have volunteered to work for less pay "until he got on his feet again". Construction started in May 1917 on a new, spacious manufacturing plant just north of the Monon Railroad "Y". By July, the plant reconstruction was said to be "nearing completion".

The new plant had 100,000 square feet of floor space, employed as many as three hundred men, and used lumber brought in from Kentucky and Tennessee in amounts up to a million board feet per month. In 1918, Kahler moved to Bay City, Michigan, and for a short time took "active charge of a woodworking plant … manufacturing airplane parts which are shipped to other points for assembling". He had returned by July, 1918, saying he had "organized the working force of an extensive manufacturing concern". In 1918, Kahler secured a US government contract to build 100,000 tables, Reports claimed the order would "keep his factory busy for six months". In July 1919, Kahler received a permit to build a substantial addition to the factory.

In 1922, Kahler closed a series of real estate deals in New Albany, giving him title to all property that fronted Vincennes Street from Grant Line Road to the northern side of the Monon Railroad line. He said the property was acquired to be "probably used as a location for future dry-kilns".

In 1927, a Kahler Company employee making wood parts for the new cars of the Ford Motor Company and General Motors made less than $600 (equivalent to $11,121 in 2025) as an annual salary. In 1930, the same employee earned $10.50 per day ($2,730 yearly) (equivalent to $52,615 in 2025) as a sawyer on a swing saw.

== Entrepreneur ==
=== Banking ===
In May 1902, Kahler was one of the original investors in the Union Savings Association (later the Union Federal Savings and Loan Association), a bank based in New Albany, Indiana. Its initial capital stock was said to be $200,000. Kahler was also a member of the bank's original board of directors.

In June 1915, Kahler was elected a director of the newly formed German-American Bank & Trust Company in New Albany, Indiana. Kahler was one of the 75 original stockholders of the bank. The initial capitalization of the bank was $200,000 (equivalent to $6,365,132 in 2025). The bank's motto was "Safety and Silence".

In January 1925, Kahler organized the Liberty Loan Company, a "petty loan company". One of six founding investors, Kahler was elected a director of the company located in the Elsby Building in New Albany.

At the time of his death in 1927, Kahler was a member of the Board of Directors of the Mutual Trust and Deposit Company in New Albany. His son Ferdinand Kahler Jr was voted to succeed him on the Board.

=== Business ===
In March 1904, Kahler was a founding member and appointed a director of the Employer's and Business Men's Association of New Albany. The stated goals of the association were "to promote stability of business, the employment of labor, whether organized or unorganized, by encouraging friendly relation between employers and employees…" The incorporators of the association were reported to be "well-known business men of New Albany, and are composed of coal dealers, foundrymen, transfer agents, tanners, stove molders, lumber dealers, merchant tailors and liverymen".

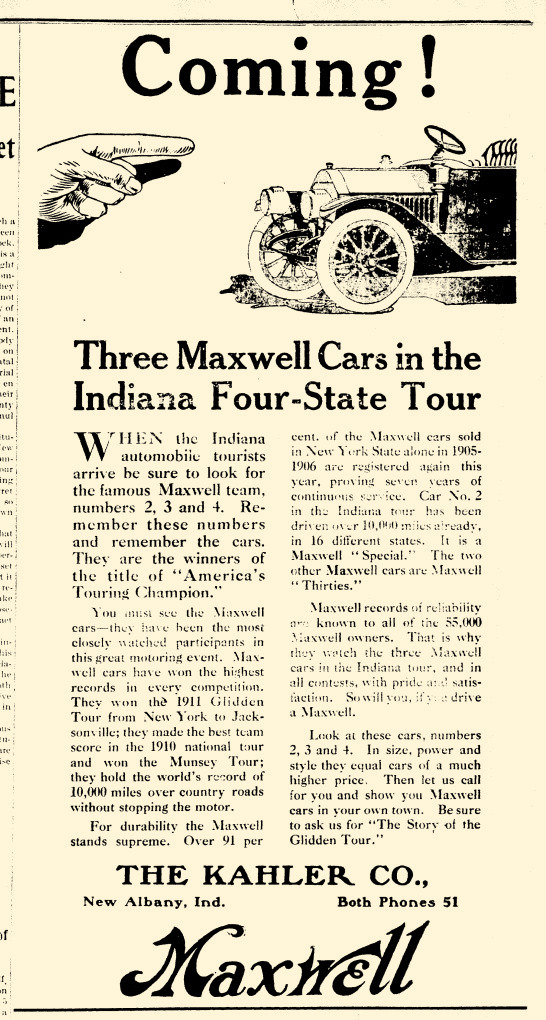

=== Maxwell automobile sales ===
In July, 1912, Ferdinand N. Kahler placed this newspaper advertisement stating the public could visit the Kahler Co. factory and see three Maxwell automobile models that were touring the nation as part of that manufacturer's "Indiana Four State Tour".

=== First Chevrolet dealer in Kentucky ===
In September 1916, Kahler was one of three investors who organized the Broadway Motor Sales Company in Louisville, Kentucky for a $3,000 investment "to deal in automobiles, motor trucks, buggies and vehicles generally". It was Louisville's first Chevrolet automobile dealership, selling 124 cars during its first year. Kahler was president of the company. In 1920, Kahler managed the increase in capital stock from $8,000 to $50,000 (equivalent to $803,571 in 2025).

Annual sales at the dealership exceeded $1,000,000 by 1925 (equivalent to $18,358,634 in 2025). In 1928, the dealership sold 1,800 new cars. The business was located at the intersection of Brook and Broadway streets in Louisville. A photograph of the storefront may be viewed by accessing the Caufield & Shook Collection at the University of Louisville (Kentucky) Photographic Archives website.

In 1924, Kahler incorporated the Economy Motor Company to sell used cars. Capitalized at $25,000, (equivalent to $469,660 in 2025) the new dealership was co-located with the Broadway Motor Sales Chevrolet dealership at 201 East Broadway in Louisville. The location was known as Louisville's "Chevrolet Corner" by 1925.

=== Automobile dealer in New Albany, Indiana ===
In September 1920 Kahler incorporated the Liberty Garage and Motor Company with two investors. The company, located on Pearl Street in New Albany was to sell "automobile trucks and tractors". The garage was granted a permit to install two gasoline tanks and pumps in 1926.

=== Early automobile loan company ===
In 1922, Kahler incorporated The Auto-Acceptance Corporation, an early auto loan company in Louisville, Kentucky.

=== Automobile dealership developer ===
In 1922, Kahler was a partner in the Haury Motor Company, initially acting as its president. He purchased the land located at 741 S. 3rd Street in Louisville, Kentucky, oversaw the building's construction and leased it to the Haury Motor Company for a ten-year term. The Haury Motor Company sold the Durant, the Scripps-Booth and the Star lines of automobiles in "Western Kentucky and Southern Indiana". The "$ 60,000 automobile sales building" (equivalent to $1,083,022 in 2025) was designed by the Louisville architectural firm Joseph & Joseph. Though the building was only two years old in 1924, it was Haury Motor Company's last year in business. While the original lease was to run from 1922 to 1932, it clearly fell quite short.

The building continued as an automobile dealership long after Haury Motor Company dissolved. In 1925 the Louisville-Flint Company, "managed by R.J. Haury", was listed in the building and no mention was made of Haury Motor Company. That firm sold the Flint. Later in 1925 the building was occupied by Fidelity Motor Co., selling the REO, Hudson and Essex lines. In March 1929 the Reo-Spalding Company leased the space from Kahler for $75,000 (equivalent to $1,406,250 in 2025) for a five years term, selling DeSoto and Plymouth automobiles. In 1940 the company was renamed "The Spalding Motor Co." selling Plymouth and Dodge vehicles and remained at this location until 1941. L.J. Hannah, a Louisville Dodge dealer since 1923, leased the building until 1952. By 1958, the building was leased by Thurston Cooke Edsel who offered British built Ford Zephyr, Zodiac and Consul cars.

The Kahler family continued as owner of the land and building until Kahler's son Ferdinand Jr's death in 1959. The estate sold the property and building to Byers Realty, Inc. in 1960.

=== Movie theaters ===
Kahler was a winter resident of and "a large property owner" in West Palm Beach, Florida. On September 14, 1927, he founded "West Palm Beach Enterprises, Inc." ultimately building a group of 14 movie theaters in the Palm Beach area. The first was "The Arcade", designed by architect Roy A. Benjamin and built at a cost of $150,000 (equivalent to $2,780,172 in 2025). The Arcade opened in October 1927, at 325 Clematis Street, then "the only first-run Independent theater" in West Palm Beach. The theatre featured 900 Heywood-Wakefield theatre seats said to have "…comfortable springs, at a cost of $12 (equivalent to $222 in 2025) each". The Arcade also featured a Mighty Wurlitzer organ and one of the first Vitaphone movie sound systems in Florida.

During an elaborate opening ceremony, E. J. Sparks, president of Sparks Enterprises, the company who first managed the West Palm Beach Enterprises theaters said of Kahler "The building of this theatre Is a tribute to Mr. Kahler's unswerving belief in the future of West Palm Beach and Palm Beach. It lakes a man with vision to build when business is dull. He (Kahler) believes absolutely in this community and this theatre stands as a monument to that belief". Kahler was ill at home in Indiana and did not attend the opening.

In 1933, Kahler's son, Ferdinand N. Kahler Jr. filed a bankruptcy proceeding against the Stanley Company, the lessors of Kahler's theatre group, claiming he was owed $1,749.99 for back rental, on a basis of a $14,000 annual rental fee. Kahler Jr's actions forced the theaters to close.

=== Plant ice and chilled storage ===
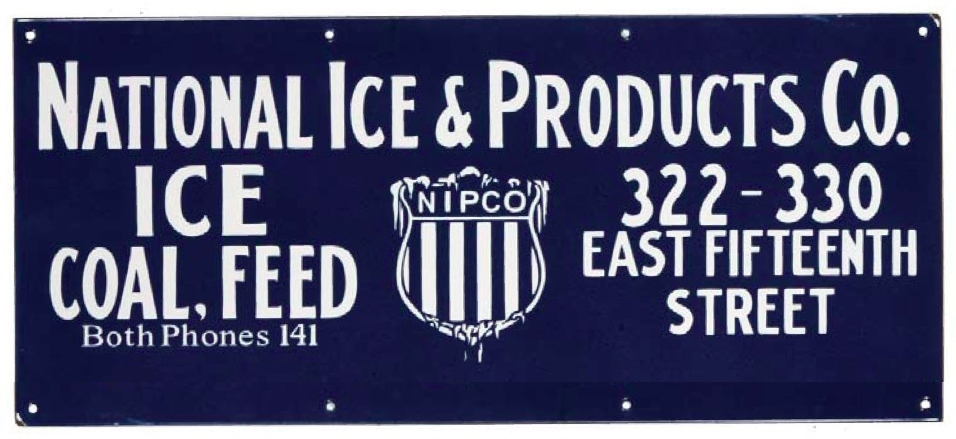
Trade sign for National Ice & Products Co. office in New Albany, Indiana, circa 1921

In 1921, Kahler was one of five investors who organized the National Ice and Products Co. in New Albany, Indiana for a $60,000 investment (equivalent to $1,083,022 in 2025). The company was formed by purchasing the equipment and facilities of the Arctic Ice and Cold Storage company, founded by Louisville businessman Charles W. Inman, after his company passed through receivership and was sold at auction. The plant was located at 322 East 15th Street in New Albany.

The company sold manufactured ice, coal and animal feed, with a focus on poultry feed. A 1922 advertisement offered "cotton seed meal, scratch feed, egg mash and cracked corn". The company also offered cold storage facilities for "seed potatoes, eggs, etc.".

In 1922, Kahler led a group of investors to purchase the bankrupt Enterprise Ice and Storage Company in New Albany, located at 1652 Division Street. It was reported that the plant "would be enlarged and new machinery and equipment installed". The company expanded to nearby Seymour, Indiana in 1923, erecting a cold storage facility there.

=== Vending machines ===
In September 1914, Kahler capitalized The Electric Machine Company in New Albany, Indiana with a $6,000 investment. Its principal business was the manufacture and sales of electric vending machines.

Production of electrically heated popcorn machines commenced in the kitchen cabinet factory building adjacent to the Kahler Co.'s main factory. By January, 1915, it was reported that "contracts have already been made for the distribution of 560 of the machines. Two kinds are made, one a counter machine and the other a vending machine, the latter being a nickel in the slot device".

In January 1915, Kahler capitalized The Electric Popcorn Machine Company in Indianapolis, Indiana with a $100,000 (equivalent to $3,182,566 in 2025) investment. The business proposed building a factory in New Albany to manufacture popcorn machines, leasing them to theaters instead of offering them for outright purchase. Kahler believed leasing "would result in a larger business than if the sales were made outright".

== Civic activities ==
In April, 1915, Kahler petitioned the New Albany City Council for the right to "exclusively operate jitney cars within city limits". Kahler offered a $1,000 per year fee for such exclusive rights, with the right to renew the contract for five years.

In April, 1916, Kahler, acting in his capacity as Secretary of the German-American Realty Company, solicited bids for the construction of its new six-story building in New Albany. Designed by Louisville, Kentucky architects Joseph & Joseph, the neoclassical Elsby Building was to be "of steel frame, reinforced concrete, fireproof construction". Constructed at a cost of $100,000 (equivalent to $3,583,333 in 2025) the building featured its own "isolated electric plant" installed at a cost of $15,000. The generating system included a Fairbanks-Morse 75 horsepower semi-diesel oil motor driven 50 kilowatt, three-phase generator for electricity as well as two twenty-five horsepower oil engines that generated 40 kilowatts for 220-volt lighting. During the construction, plasterers set Macalite hollow tiles, causing bricklayers to walk off of the job. The day after the walkout, the contractor, the Alfred Struck Company of Louisville conceded the point and the bricklayers returned to the job site.

In August, 1921, Indiana Governor Warren T. McCray appointed Kahler one of three members of a state commission to supervise the construction of monuments at the unmarked graves of former Indiana Governor Ashbel P. Willard (died in office, 1860) and former Speaker of the House Michael C. Kerr (US Congress, 1865–1876), both buried in Fairview Cemetery in New Albany, Indiana. The Indiana Legislature had appropriated $1,000 on March 2, 1921, for the erection of the monuments.

== Inventions ==
Kahler was granted a number of US utility patents for his inventions, among them: US 559,713 "Machine for Cutting Noodles" May 5, 1896; US 635,401 "Extension Platform (for railway cars)" August 29, 1899; US 656,379 "Brake" August 21, 1900.
