= American (1911 automobile) =

Defunct American motor vehicle manufacturer

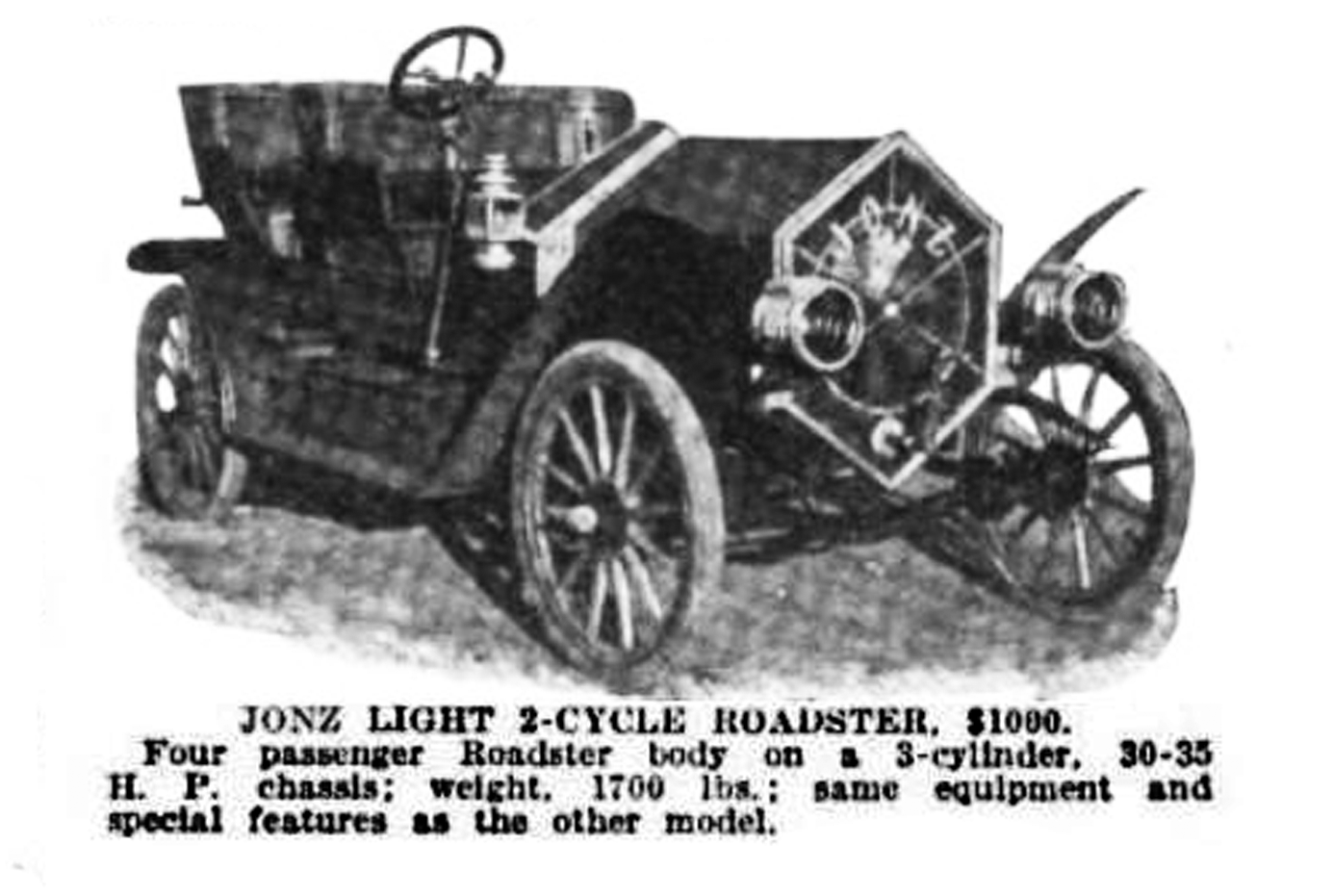
Jonz Automobile Light 2-Cycle Roadster catalog listing, from "Motor Age", 1911

Founded in Kansas City, Missouri in 1908, the American Automobile Manufacturing Company acquired the Jonz Automobile Company of Beatrice, Nebraska in 1910 with a planned initial capitalization of $1,000,000. In early news releases, the company claimed "$100,000 of the stock has been subscribed for by Chicago and Kansas City men". Initial plans called for the establishment of factories in Kansas City and Louisville, Kentucky.

The company settled on moving its offices to Louisville, Kentucky in December, 1910, and began manufacturing in an abandoned woolen mill across the Ohio River from Louisville in New Albany, Indiana. The factory buildings were two and three stories in height, located on a six-acre tract on Vincennes Street in New Albany. The factory was reported in 1914 to be "one of the very largest factories in the state of Indiana... and is equipped with machinery, tools, raw materials, parts and accessories for the manufacture of motor cars."

Promising huge potential profits, the company sold stock using catalogs, pamphlets and an extensive magazine and newspaper ad campaign reaching as far as Great Britain. The company did produce a limited number of cars which were marketed as the Jonz (automobile), named after the "Jonz Tranquil Motor" developed by the three Jones brothers in Kansas. The American Automobile Manufacturing Company built the two-stroke engine "American" from 1911 to 1912 in New Albany.

American Automobile Corporation went bankrupt, and Ferdinand N. Kahler purchased its assets, forming the Ohio Falls Motor Company, largely to protect the assets of his woodworking business, The Kahler Company.
