= Whiteside Theatre =

- U.S. National Register of Historic Places
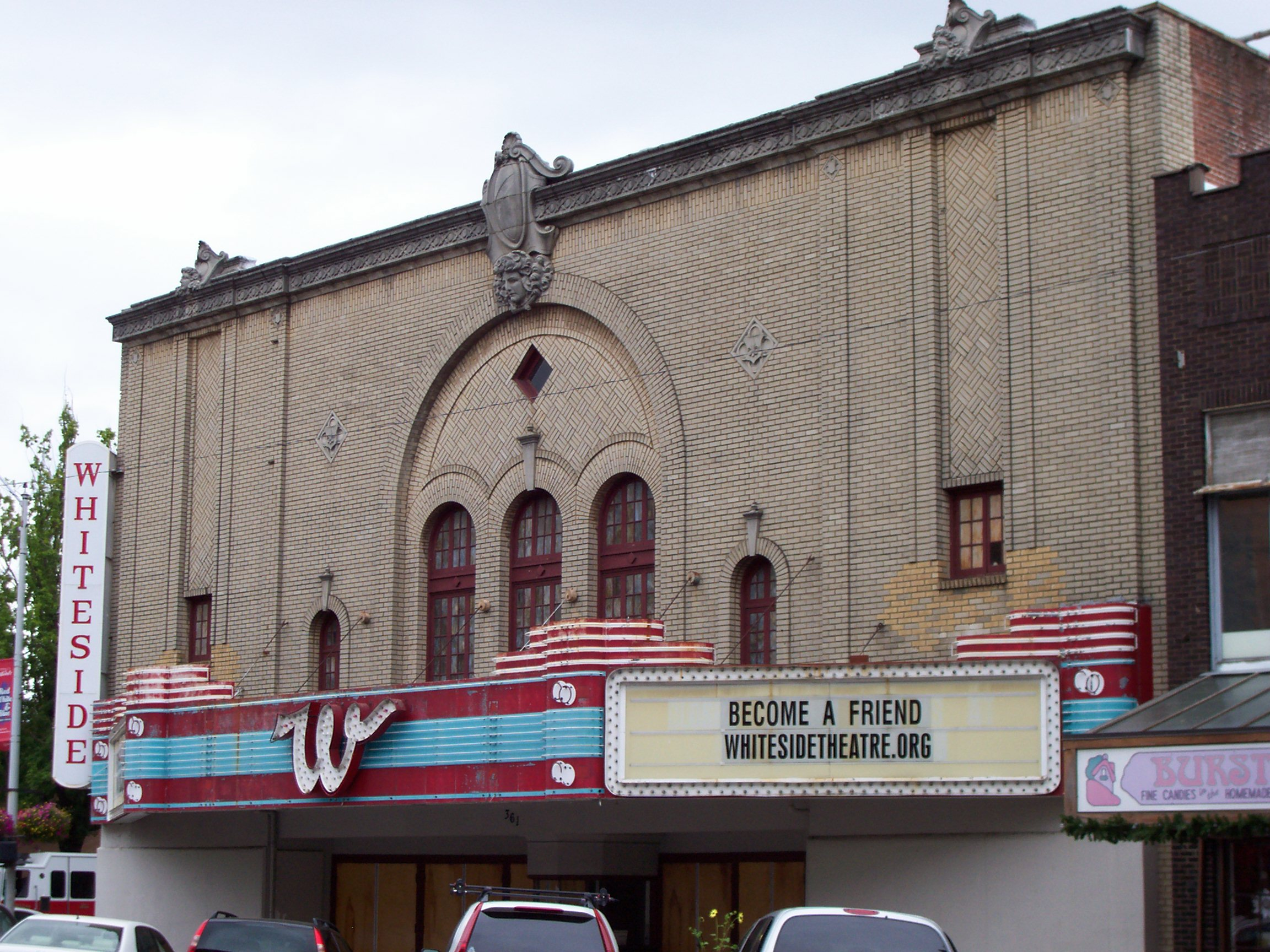
- The Whiteside Theatre in 2009

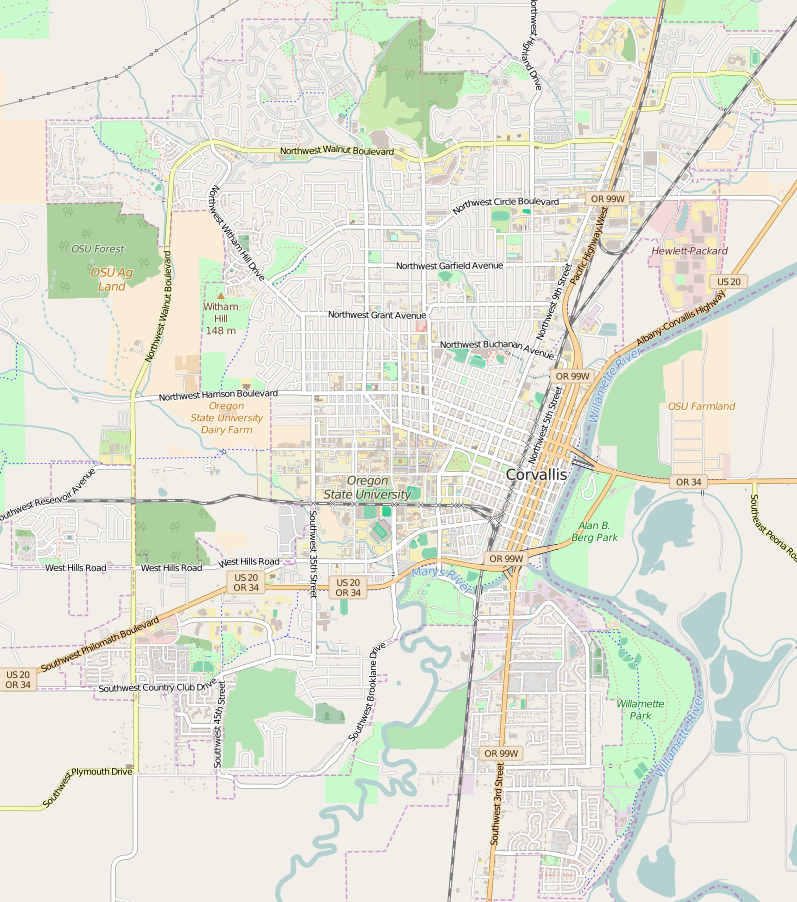
- Location within Corvallis OR Location within Oregon
- Location: 361 SW Madison Avenue; Corvallis, Oregon
- Coordinates: 44°33′49″N 123°15′44″W
- Area: Approx. 0.16 acres (0.065 ha)
- Built: 1922
- Built by: McFadden & Swain
- Architect: Henderson Ryan
- Architectural style: Renaissance Revival
- NRHP reference No.: 09000060
- Added to NRHP: February 25, 2009

The Whiteside Theatre is a historic theater building in Corvallis, Oregon, United States. Constructed in 1922 and closed as a commercial theater in 2002, the 800-seat venue was named to the National Register of Historic Places in 2009.

== History ==
=== Opening ===
Ad for East is West, starring Constance Talmadge, from the Whiteside Theatre's first month of operations.

The Whiteside Theatre, located on the northeast corner of 4th Street and SW Madison Avenue in Corvallis, Oregon, was opened to the public on November 10, 1922. The theater's opening featured a special program and a showing of the film The Old Homestead, a Paramount film which starred Theodore Roberts, T. Roy Barns, Fritzi Ridgeway, and George Fawcett.

The opening was deemed a "great success" in front-page coverage in the local press the following Monday:

The new Whiteside Theatre was taxed to capacity Friday night, when throngs of people, in spite of the rain, came out to witness the opening of this magnificent new picture palace. The crowd was so great that in spite of quick work by ticket seller and ushers, the program could not begin until after 7 o'clock. From organ railing to the last row of seats in the gallery, the house was filled, and hundreds stood outside or went away without getting into the first show.

The theater featured a Wurlitzer organ touted as "unsurpassed in tone and quality by any organ in the state" and was decorated with luxurious draperies and attractive murals, as well as floral decorations. The organ was of particular importance in this era of silent film, with a Seattle movie theater owner named Winstock observing to the crowd on opening night that "pictures can not be produced without fitting music" and noting that film companies took great care in providing "suitable music for picture plays." The new Whiteside Theatre provided "the best of facilities for enjoying such music," Winstock declared.

Construction of the theater on behalf of the Whiteside brothers, Sam and George, who did business as the Corvallis Amusement Company, was said to have cost $120,000.

The Whitesides were natives of Iowa who had spent a quarter century in Corvallis prior to the opening of their namesake theater. The pair had been active in the movie business in Corvallis since about 1910 as owners and operators of the Crystal Theatre, the town's first venue for motion pictures. A year after the opening of the Crystal, the Whitesides constructed a second theater in Corvallis, the Majestic Theatre, a building which was itself surpassed in size and quality with the launch of the Whiteside. The Crystal Theater was closed during the summer of 1922.

=== 1927 fire ===
In October 1927 the Whiteside was badly damaged by a fire which was determined to have started in a paint room at the back of the stage. The theater's prized Wurlitzer organ, valued at $16,000, was a total loss in the blaze, and new draperies and chairs were required. The theater remained closed for repairs and remodeling for the rest of the year.

The refurbished theatre reopened on January 2, 1928, to a capacity crowd, which saw the Pacific Northwest debut of the film Hero for a Night. During a short program which preceded the film, the crowd was entertained by a local resident playing a set of popular tunes on the theatre's new organ.

=== Talking pictures and other uses ===
Matinee pass for the "Fox Whiteside Theatre," 1932.

On December 26, 1928, the Whiteside Theatre showed the first "talking picture" in Corvallis. Some $35,000 had been invested by the Whitesides in new Vitaphone equipment developed by Warner Brothers, the installation of which took about six weeks. The Vitaphone system made use of a turntable adjacent to the movie projector, both of which were driven by the same motor, which kept the speed constant. An electric pick-up and amplifier located in the projection room transmitted the sound to multiple horns spread out throughout the theater. A new set of rates accompanied the costly upgrade, with the Whiteside initially charging 50 cents for adult admission and 15 cents for children, with loge seats selling for 75 cents — although midweek and afternoon matinees were offered with reduced entrance fees. The Jazz Singer, a 1927 film starring Al Jolson, was slated to debut in Corvallis at the Whiteside on New Year's Day of 1929, with a steady stream of "talkies" booked for subsequent weeks.

In addition to providing a spacious venue for the viewing of films, the stage of the Whiteside Theatre also served as a public auditorium for community events, including a patriotic Memorial Day program in May 1928 under the auspices of the local post of the American Legion. In April 1929, the Whiteside was the site of the first citywide beauty contest in Corvallis, with the winner outfitted by local merchants and sent on an all expenses paid trip to the 10th annual International Pageant of Pulchritude (today's "Miss Universe" pageant) in Galveston, Texas as the representative of Oregon.

=== Later years and restoration efforts ===
The Whiteside Theatre remained in constant operation throughout the 20th century. In the 1990s it was purchased by the Knoxville, Tennessee-based Regal Cinemas, which operated the facility until its closure in January 2002. The final movie shown in the theater during its initial commercial incarnation was the Peter Jackson epic The Fellowship of the Ring. Failed sewer lines necessitating a costly remodel and lack of profitability of the giant 800 seat movie palace in an era of multiplex theaters were cited as reasons for the closure by the national theater chain. Regal chose not to gut the facility at the time of the theater's shuttering, thereby making future restoration feasible.

In 2006, Corvallis residents organized to raise public support and funds for restoration of the Whiteside Theatre. Over the next ten years many tens of thousands of dollars were raised and restoration has taken place; classic films are frequently shown and public events are once again being held on stage at the facility. Restoration work continues.

The theater was listed on the National Register of Historic Places in February 2009.

== See also ==
- Charles and Ibby Whiteside House
- National Register of Historic Places listings in Benton County, Oregon
