= Heřmánkovice =

- Municipality
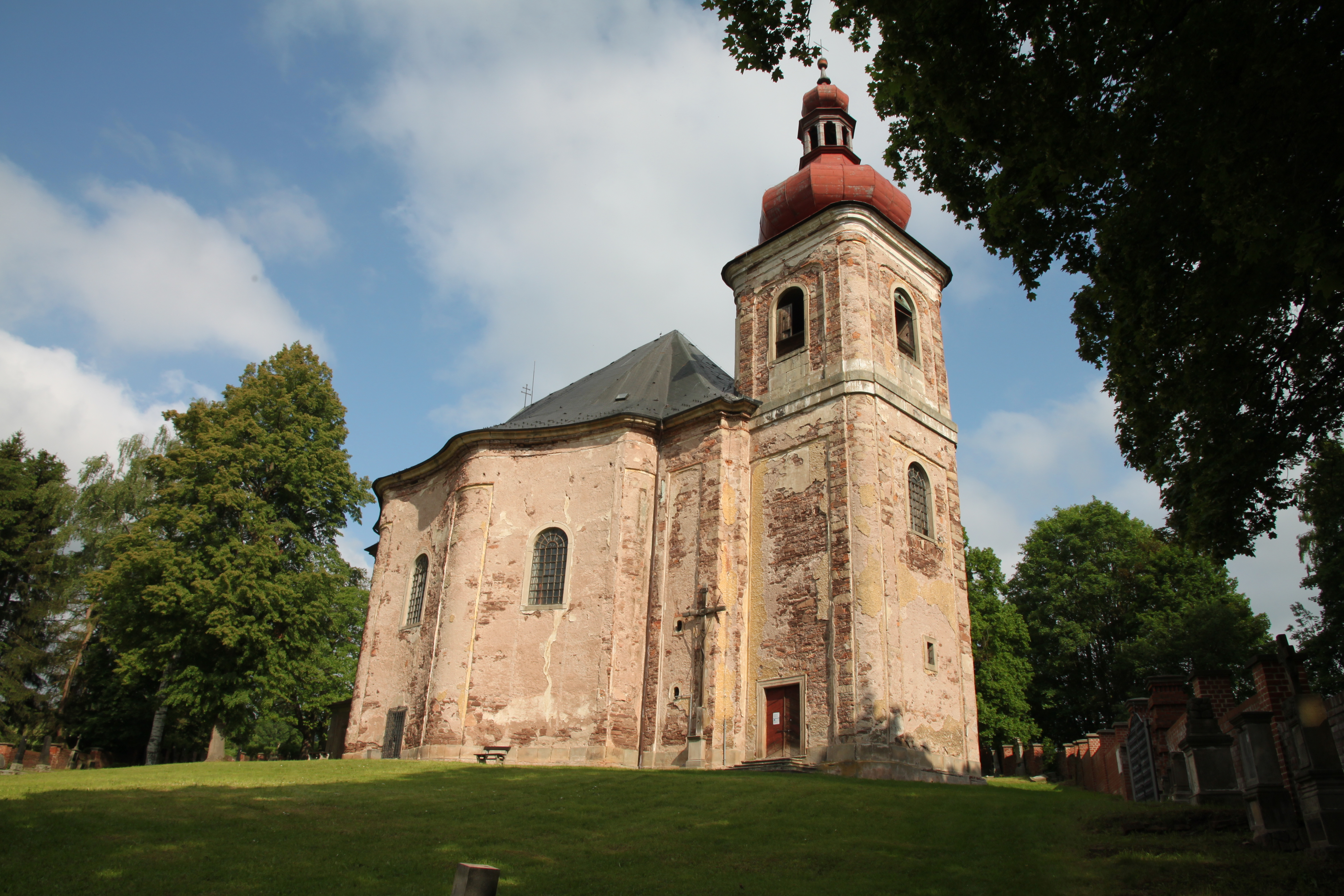
- Church of All Saints

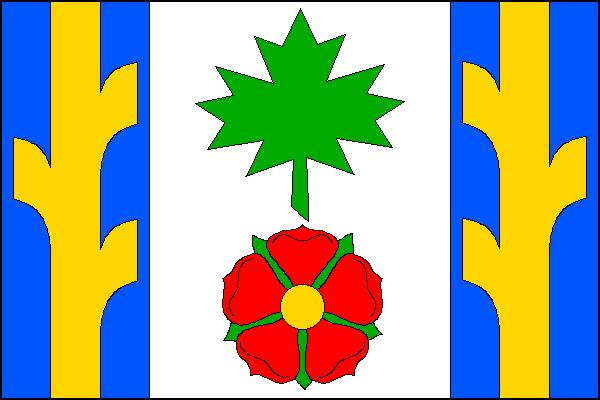
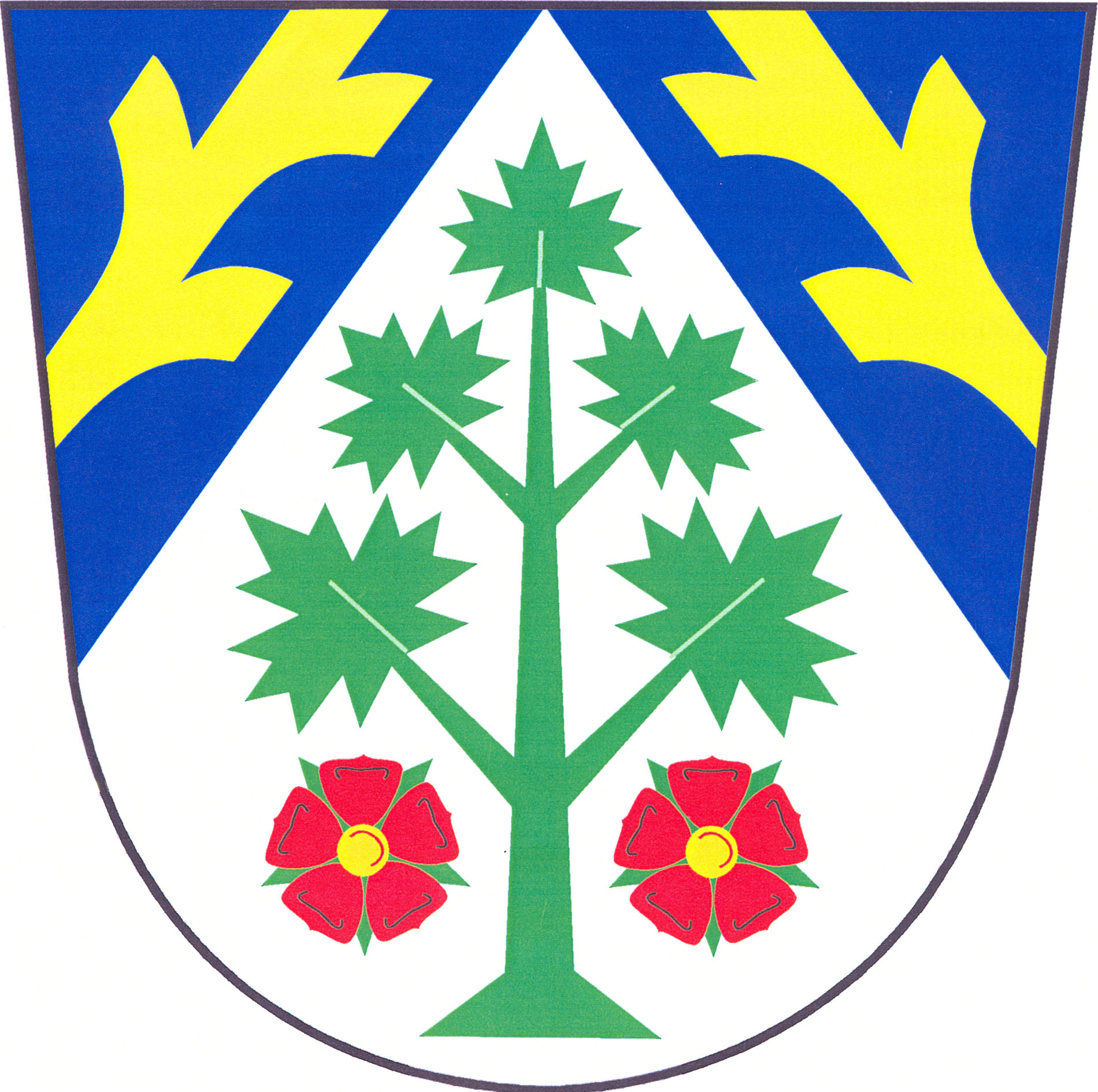
- Flag Coat of arms

- Location in the Czech Republic
- Coordinates: 50°37′12″N 16°19′26″E
- Country: Czech Republic
- Region: Hradec Králové
- District: Náchod
- First mentioned: 1353

Area
  - Total: 19.93 km^{2} (7.70 sq mi)
- Elevation: 447 m (1,467 ft)

Population (2026-01-01)
  - Total: 490
  - Density: 25/km^{2} (64/sq mi)
- Time zone: UTC+1 (CET)
  - Summer (DST): UTC+2 (CEST)
- Postal codes: 549 84, 550 01
- Website: www.hermankovice.cz

Heřmánkovice (German: Hermsdorf) is a municipality and village in Náchod District in the Hradec Králové Region of the Czech Republic. It has about 500 inhabitants. It is located on the border with Poland. It is known for the Church of All Saints, protected as a national cultural monument.

== Administrative division ==
Heřmánkovice consists of two municipal parts (in brackets population according to the 2021 census):

- Heřmánkovice (459)
- Janovičky (23)

== Demographics ==
Historical population
Year	Pop.	±%
1869	2,148	—
1880	2,048	−4.7%
1890	2,036	−0.6%
1900	2,030	−0.3%
1910	2,073	+2.1%
1921	1,850	−10.8%
1930	1,760	−4.9%
1950	656	−62.7%
1961	626	−4.6%
1970	639	+2.1%
1980	528	−17.4%
1991	467	−11.6%
2001	492	+5.4%
2011	471	−4.3%
2021	482	+2.3%
Source: Censuses

== Sights ==
The main landmark of Heřmánkovice is the Church of All Saints. It was built in the Baroque style in 1720–1726 by Kilian Ignaz Dientzenhofer, according to the design by his father Christoph Dientzenhofer. For its value it has been protected as a national cultural monument since 2022.
