= Jonz (automobile) =

Defunct American motor vehicle manufacturer

Jonz Automobile Co.
- Industry: Vehicle manufacture
- Founded: February 1908; 118 years ago
- Founder: Jones brothers
- Defunct: May 1912
- Headquarters: Beatrice, Nebraska, U.S.
- Products: Automobiles

Jonz, Brass Era automobiles and trucks were built by the Jonz Automobile Company from 1908 through 1914 in Beatrice, Nebraska.

== History ==
The Jonz automobiles and Jonz trucks were built by the Jonz Automobile Company as an American vehicle from 1908 through 1914. The early vehicles were built at the Jonz factory at Seventh and Doane Streets in Beatrice, Nebraska and were later produced in New Albany, Indiana. The Jonz company was founded by inventor Charles Chesterfield ("C. Chester") Jones and his two brothers. Three different models of Jones' patented "vapor cooled engine" cars were initially offered, a roadster, a runabout and a touring car. These models could be ordered with one of three different versions of Jones' patented "Jonz Tranquil Motor".

=== Unique Combustion Engine ===
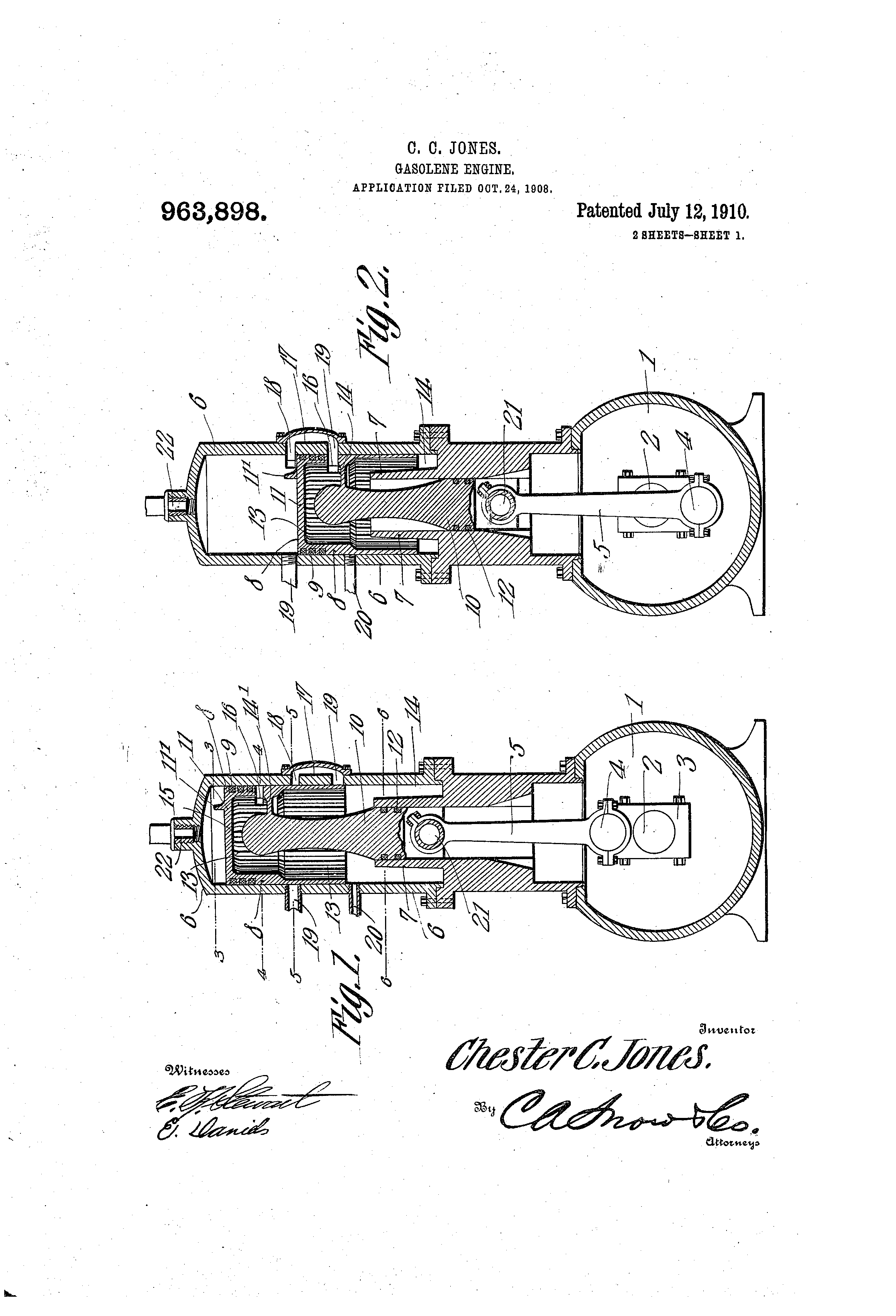
Illustration taken from US Patent Application 963,898 - C. Chester Jones - Gasoline Engine

In 1908 Jones applied for a patent on a 2-stroke gasoline engine that he described as "new and useful" because of its claimed simplicity. The motor design used only five movable parts and did not use a typical radiator and water system to cool the motor. Integral ribs and fins on the internal piston surfaces were designed to cool the motor through the movement of exterior air and fuel mixing inside the combustion cylinder. Advertising for the motor described a "vapor-cooled engine ... it has no valves, no cams, no gears, no push-rods, no rollers, no rocker arms, no pumps, no radiator, and no water." Jones was granted US Utility Patent 963,898 for his engine on July 12, 1910.

Jones further refined his engine in 1909, increasing the heat radiation capacity by adding large exterior fins and using highly heat-conductive copper and other materials. He was granted US Utility Patent No. 1,028,359 on June 4, 1912.

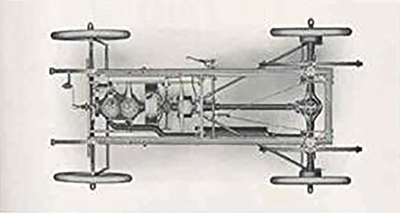
An overhead image of the 1908 Jonz Model A chassis as built by the Jonz Automobile Co. of Beatrice, Nebraska

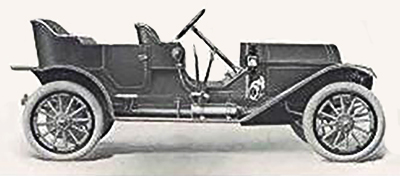
An image of the 1908 Jonz Demi-Tonneau Runabout offered by the Jonz Automobile Co. of Beatrice, Nebraska

=== Marketing Claims ===
The Jonz motor was advertised as "the only external and internal non-heating and ever cool engine ever made. By the non-use of water and simplicity in the construction of their motor, which eliminates 1000 parts of the ordinary 4-cylinder car thereby reducing 350 pounds of dead weight off your car, lessening the cost of motive power to one cent per mile, cost of maintenance eighty per cent. Any farmer can tear a 'Jonz Motor' apart and put it together if he can a mowing machine. Every farmer is his own mechanic in handling the Jonz car".

Another advertisement claimed the Jonz automobile was "destined, we believe, to revolutionize the automobile industry, for they are driven by an engine having 62 parts instead of the 1,000 to 3,000, as have the engines in most of the other successful cars, they weigh some 300 pounds instead of from 800 to 1,200 and are so simply constructed that the owner of a car can keep his engine in order even if by no means he is a mechanic".

=== Nebraska Production ===
Originally a Jackson Automobile Company dealer in Omaha, Nebraska, C. Chester Jones began building an automobile factory on Ella Street near by his dealership in the spring of 1908. The factory was opened for production in July.

In October, 1908, it was reported the Jonz Automobile Co. had “completed its experimental machine” and had successfully completed a test drive to Lincoln, Nebraska. The 50-mile trip took 1¼ hours to the capital and 1½ hours back with no problems along the way. Jones immediately proceeded to build a green Jonz with red trim for the Chicago Auto Show.

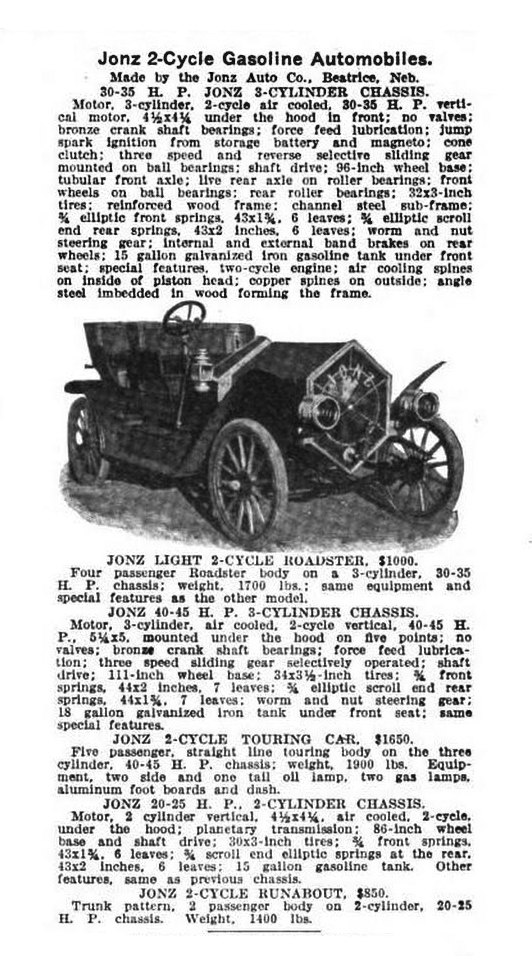
A list of the available 1909 automobile models offered by the Jonz Automobile Co. of Beatrice, Nebraska

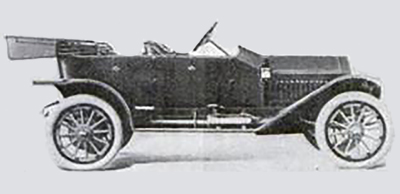
An image of the 1910 Jonz Four-door Runabout offered by the Jonz Automobile Co. of Beatrice, Nebraska

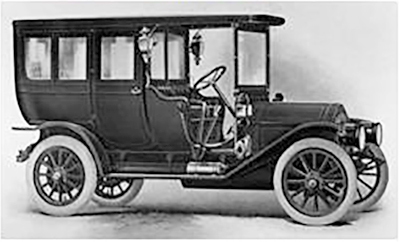
An image of the 1910 Jonz Taxi offered by the Jonz Automobile Co. of Beatrice, Nebraska with a body built by The Kahler Co., New Albany, Indiana

A 1909 price list shows a three-cylinder Jonz Touring Car cost $1,650 (equivalent to $59,125 in 2025).

The Jonz Co. merged in 1909 with the Beatrice Automobile Manufacturing & Beatrice Lawn Mower Co. and reincorporated with a $100,000 capitalization as the Jonz Auto Company. The reorganized company retained the former Jonz Co. manufacturing plant located at South Seventh Street and moved its office to the newly built Beatrice Automobile office building. The new company announced that it would "enlarge its factory and new machinery added."

Already short of capital, Jones threatened to move the factory if more money could not be raised. In support of the plea, the Beatrice Sun reported "The factory is now in full blast, and the Beatrice citizens and residents of this section must give it the support it merits, or the industry will give us the go by." The Sun urged people to give financial assistance to ensure the local success. Claiming to have already invested $25,000 in the Jonz company, the Beatrice "Commercial Club" offered for sale $10,000 of Jonz stock to the local business community but could not raise the funds. When additional funds did not quickly materialize and several creditors filed against them, the company was mortgaged to a local savings and loan company. As threatened, outside buyers were solicited, with investors in Illinois, Texas and Wisconsin showing interest.

Two Jonz touring cars were seized to satisfy $550 in claims against the company made by Beatrice, Nebraska architect R.W. Grant for construction plans and specifications to build the Jonz Beatrice factory. The touring cars were being repainted in a wagon shop when the sheriff took possession of the cars.

=== Indiana Production ===
In mid-1910, it was announced that the Jonz Co. was planning to erect a three-story, 46-by-140-foot addition to its factory in Beatrice. That December, despite the proposed addition, the Beatrice facility closed. The automobile operation was reincorporated as part of the American Automobile Co. in Indiana. Founded in Kansas CIty, Missouri in 1908, the American Automobile Manufacturing Company acquired the Jonz Automobile Company of Beatrice, Nebraska and moved its offices to Louisville, Kentucky, and its production across the Ohio River in Indiana, setting up its entire manufacturing operation, including machine shops and equipment in the idle New Albany Woolen Mills factory.

The factory buildings were two and three stories in height, located on a six-acre tract on Vincennes Street in New Albany. The factory was reported in 1914 to be "one of the very largest factories in the state of Indiana... and is equipped with machinery, tools, raw materials, parts and accessories for the manufacture of motor cars". In 1911, Ferdinand N. Kahler, founder of the Kahler Co., won a contract to build the frames and other wood components of the American Automobile Manufacturing Company automobiles being assembled in New Albany, Indiana.

Large advertisements were placed in “Popular Mechanics” in April 1911 advertising the sale of American Automobile Co. stock, stating it required additional capital to fulfill existing orders for $450,000 worth of Jonz cars, now renamed the “American” automobile. Purchase prices for the Jonz autos were lowered. A 1911 Jonz Runabout cost $825.00 (equivalent to $28,507 in 2025).

Promising huge potential profits, the company sold $900,000 worth of stock (equivalent to $31,098,214 in 2025) and produced a limited number of cars which were marketed as "The Jonz," named after the patented "Jonz 'Tranquil Motor'" developed by the three Jones brothers in Kansas. The American Automobile Manufacturing Company built the two-stroke engine American from 1911 to 1912 in New Albany. The American Automobile Manufacturing Company was reincorporated as The American Automobile Corp. in Arizona on March 13, 1912, with a capitalization of $500,000 (equivalent to $16,681,034 in 2025). That corporation went bankrupt, and Kahler purchased its assets in June, 1912. In December, 1912, he reorganized the company with a capitalization of $450,000 (equivalent to $15,012,931 in 2025), changing the name to Ohio Falls Motor Company, largely to protect the assets of his woodworking business.

=== Auto Racing Results ===
Jonz automobiles were raced in the Beatrice, Nebraska area in races organized by the Beatrice Driving Association. Attendance was free of charge. The three races held on June 24, 1909, saw a Jonz auto driven by C. Chester Jones compete with a Buick car and a Jackson car. The Buick, driven by Fern Fulton won the "One Mile Dash" with a time of 1:42, the Jonz car second and the Jackson, driven by Jess Strough third. The "Two Mile Dash" was won by the Jonz auto with a time of 2:42, with the Buick second and the Jackson third. The Buick won the "Three Mile Dash" in 5:20. The Jonz finished second, even though the Jonz car struck the Jackson during the race, "partially dismantling it. The axle of the Jones machine was badly bent, but Jonz finished second in the race without a bobble." After the collision, the Jackson dropped out and did not finish the race.

== Surviving Examples ==
As of 2017, the only known example of a Jonz automobile may be seen at the Classic Car Collection in Kearney, Nebraska, 3600 East HWY 30, Suite B, telephone (308) 234–1964.
