= Airplane Bungalow =

Architectural style

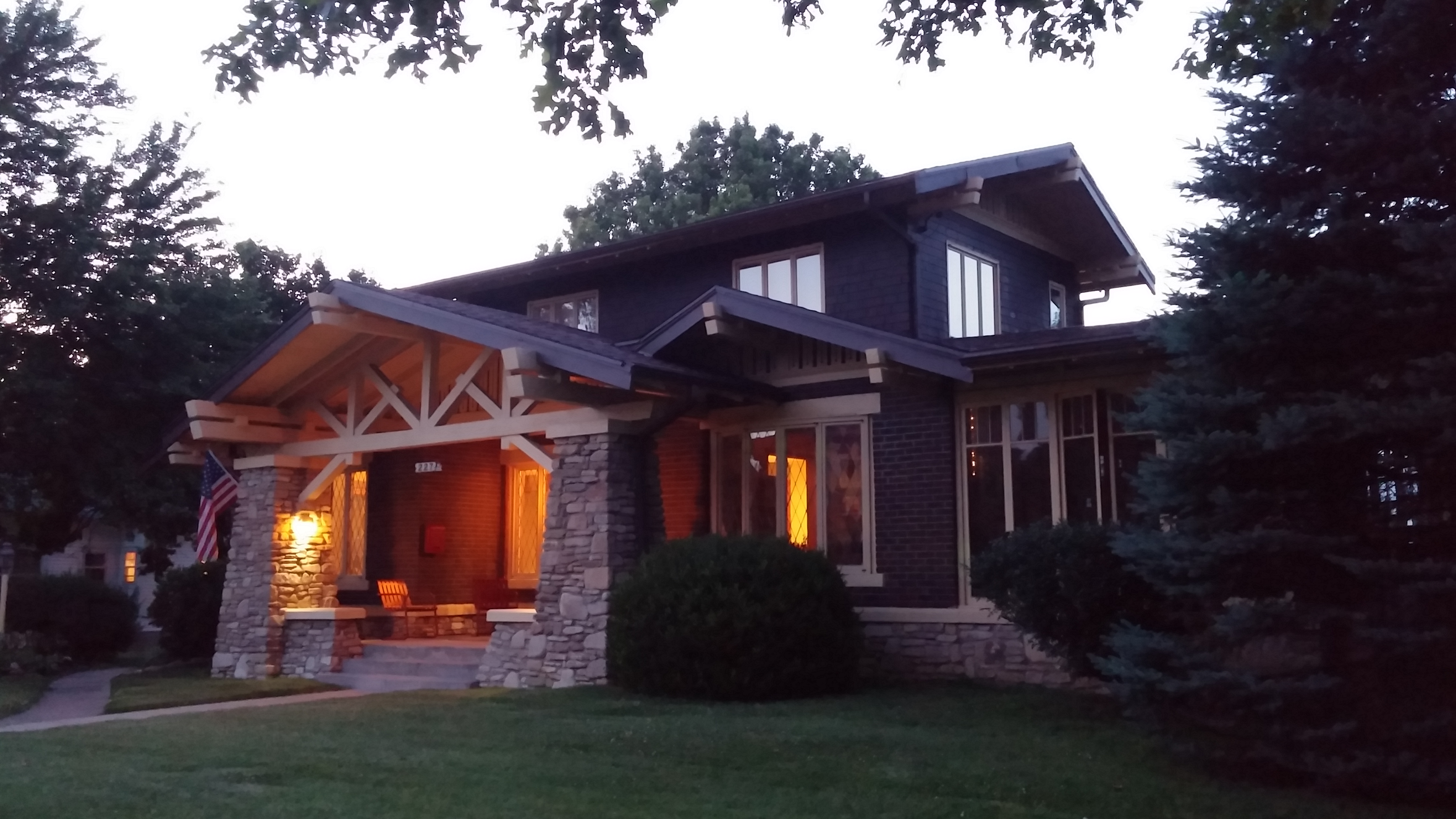
Example in Aurora, Missouri

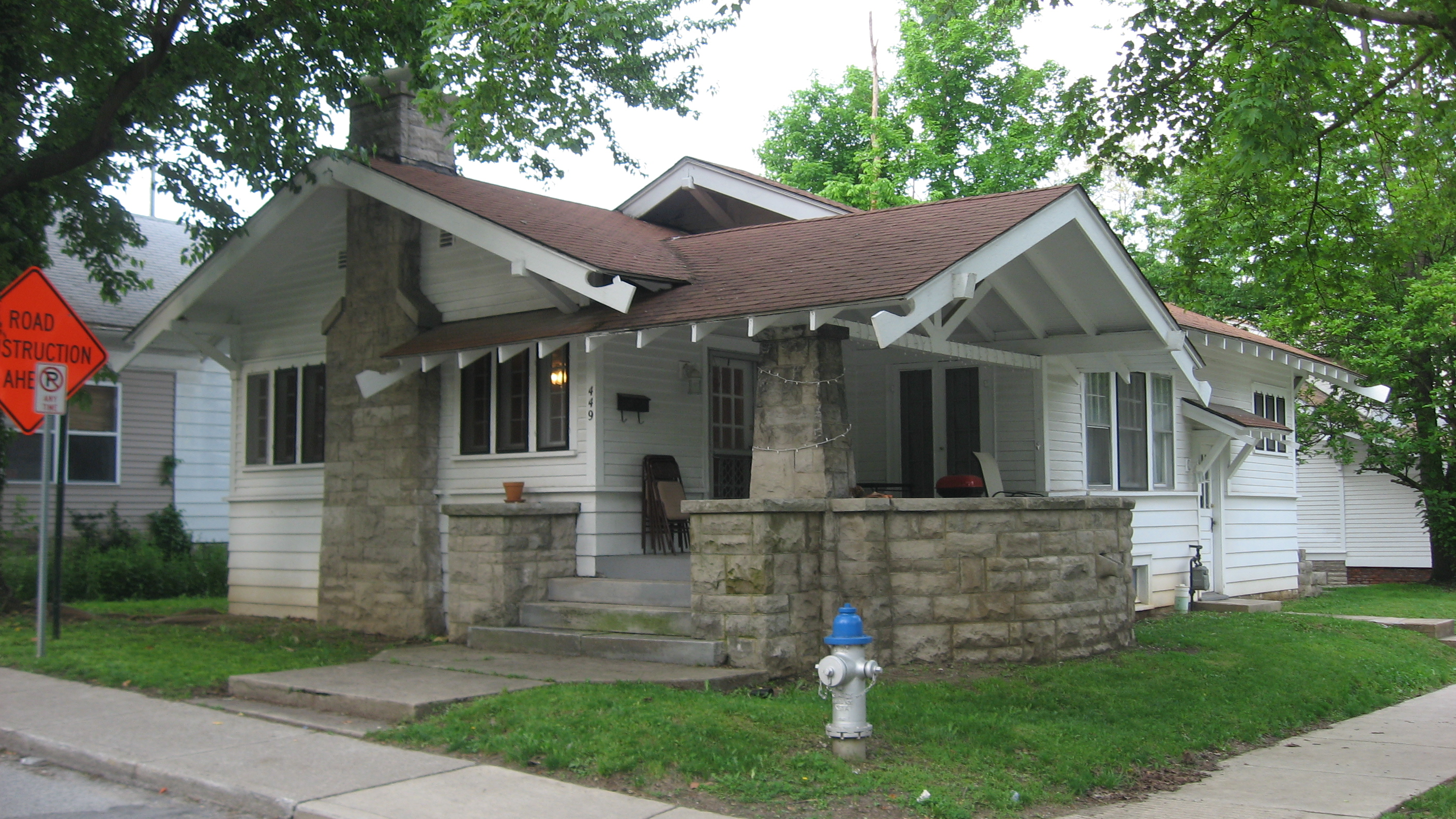
Example in Bloomington, Indiana

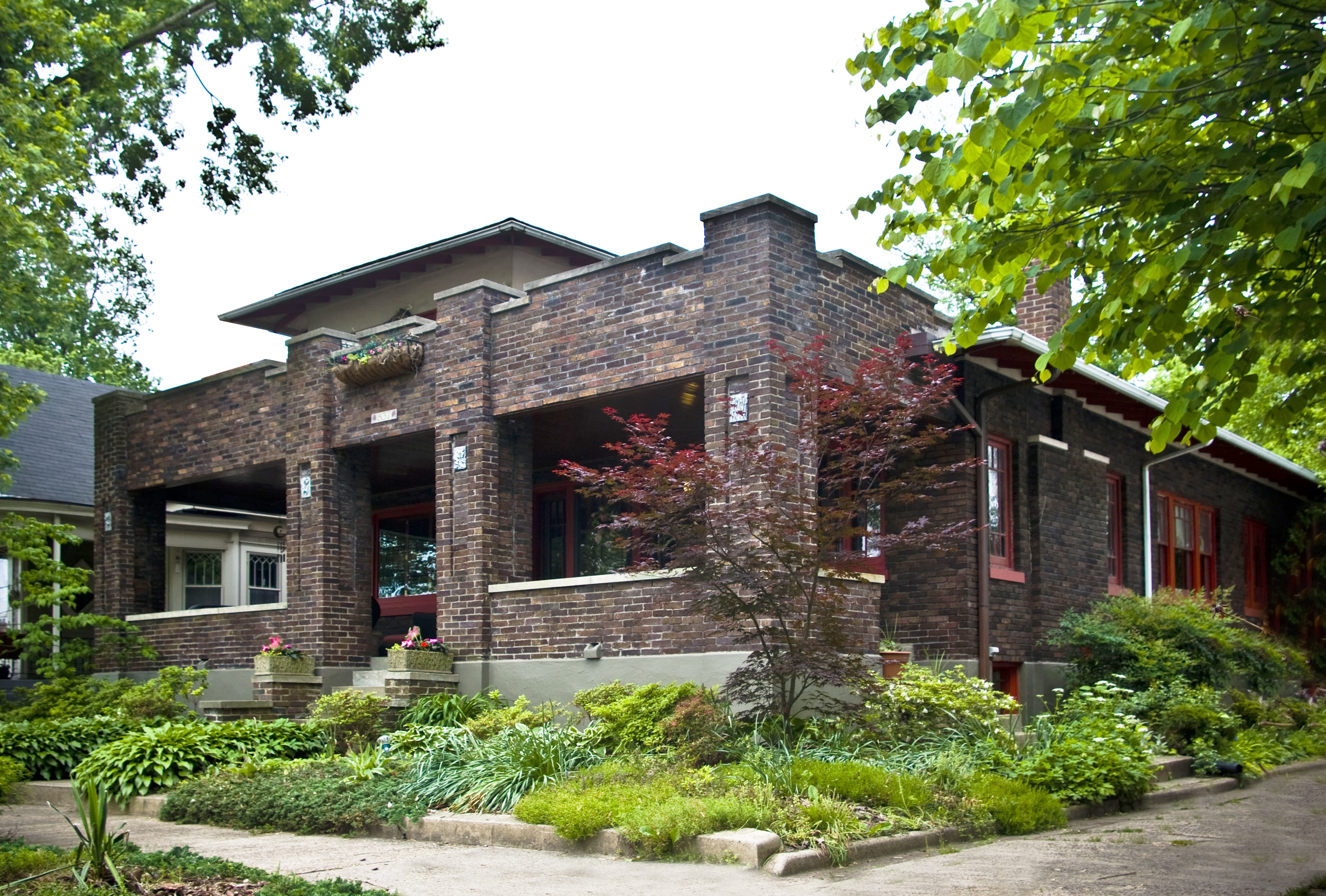
Ferdinand N. Kahler house, New Albany, Indiana

The Airplane Bungalow is a residential style of the United States dating from the early 20th century, with roots in the Arts and Crafts Movement, and elements also common to the American Craftsman style, and Prairie Style. It was more popular in the western half of the U.S., and southwestern and western Canada.

General similarities to the California bungalow include low-pitched, gabled roofs with oversized eaves and exposed rafters that create a canopy effect, and bands of windows. In most accounts the special characteristic of "airplane" bungalows is a single room on the second floor, surrounded by windows, said to resemble the cockpit of an airplane, and designed as a sleeping room in summer weather with all-around access to breezes.

One early example is the Pleasance House in Echo Park, Los Angeles, dating from 1914. The style is described (in this source) as a variation of the Craftsman style, characterized by "its 'pop-up' second story; low-pitched gable roof with wide eaves and exposed structural members; wood clapboard siding; wood windows (primarily double-hung, with some tripartite, fixed, and casement); and prominent projecting front entrance porch."

By April 1916 the style had "just reached" El Paso, Texas, with a house, in the 2600 block, on the south side of Montana Street (now Avenue). Newspaper coverage noted the style's popularity in California for several years prior, and that "The room in the top of the roof, which gives the bungalow its name, is designed as a sleeping room."

The house of inventor and industrialist Ferdinand N. Kahler in New Albany, Indiana, built circa 1920, meets that criterion with its second-story sleeping room, even though the straightforward rectilinear design lacks gables and overhangs, and was brick construction, not wood.

== See also ==
- Lewis Shaw Coleman House
- L. A. and Adelheid Machemehl House
