= The First Lady Tour =

2005 concert tour by Faith Evans

- Tour by Faith Evans
- Associated album: The First Lady
- Start date: June 18, 2005
- End date: September 3, 2005
- Legs: 1
- No. of shows: 35 in North America

Faith Evans concert chronology
- Keep the Faith Tour (1999-2000); The First Lady Tour (2005); Something About Faith Tour (2010-11)

The First Lady Tour is a music concert tour by American R&B singer Faith Evans, and supports her gold selling album The First Lady, visiting cities throughout North America. The trek started on June 18 in Pittsburgh, PA at the WAMO Summer Jam concert featuring Master P, Common, Teairra Mari and Cassidy.

Following the North American outing, Evans performed additional dates in Europe. To support the album and tour, BET aired, "An Evening with The First Lady", showcasing Evans performing songs from the album.

Kameelah Williams, lead singer of the R&B female group 702, joined the tour as a background singer and contributed backing vocals on a few songs on Faith's The First Lady album. At select dates Williams showcased her vocal skills during Faith's introduction of her Band.

== Opening acts ==
- KeKe Wyatt
- Anthony David

== Set list ==
1. "All Night Long"
2. "Burnin' Up"
3. "Love Like This"
4. "Can't Believe"
5. "I Love You"
6. "No Other Love"
7. "Come Over"
8. "Soon as I Get Home"
9. "Ain't Nobody"
10. Notorious B.I.G. Tribute: "Hypnotize" / "One More Chance" / "Juicy" / "Mo Money Mo Problems"
11. "Faithful" (Interlude) / "Faithfully"
12. "Alone in This World"
13. "Fallin' in Love"
14. "You Used to Love Me"
15. "You Gets No Love"
16. "Never Gonna Let You Go"
17. "Goin' Out"
18. "Jealous"
19. "Again"
20. "Get Over You"
21. "Tru Love"
22. "I Don't Need It"

Encore

23. "Stop N Go"
24. "Mesmerized"

== Notes ==
- The set list included a tribute to her late husband rapper the Notorious B.I.G., that consisted of a DJ medley of his pop hit songs.

== Tour dates ==
Date	City	Country	Venue
North America
June 18, 2005^{[A]}	Pittsburgh	United States	Chevrolet Amphitheatre
June 24, 2005^{[B]}	Chicago	United States	Petrillo Music Shell
June 26, 2005	Baltimore	United States	Oriole Park at Camden Yards Lot
June 28, 2005	Anaheim	United States	House of Blues
June 29, 2005	West Hollywood	United States	House of Blues
July 2, 2005^{[C]}	Detroit	United States	New Center
July 5, 2005	Washington, D.C.	United States	9:30 Club
July 7, 2005	Atlantic City	United States	House of Blues
July 9, 2005	Ledyard	United States	Fox Theatre
July 10, 2005	Poughkeepsie	United States	Chance Theatre
July 14, 2005	Philadelphia	United States	Trocadero Theatre
July 15, 2005	Newark	United States	Newark Symphony Hall
July 16, 2005	New York City	United States	B.B. King's Blues Club
July 17, 2005^{[D]}	Rochester	United States	Genesee Valley Park
July 19, 2005	North Myrtle Beach	United States	House of Blues
July 20, 2005	Atlanta	United States	EarthLink Live
July 23, 2005	Orlando	United States	House of Blues
July 24, 2005	Miami	United States	Mansion Nightclub
July 27, 2005	Dallas	United States	Gypsy Tea Room
July 28, 2005	Houston	United States	Verizon Wireless Theater
July 29, 2005	New Orleans	United States	House of Blues
July 30, 2005	Houma	United States	City Lights
August 2, 2005	Minneapolis	United States	Quest
August 3, 2005	Chicago	United States	House of Blues
August 5, 2005^{[E]}	Columbus	United States	Celeste Center
August 7, 2005	Cleveland	United States	House of Blues
August 19, 2005^{[F]}	Cincinnati	United States	Paul Brown Stadium
August 20, 2005	St. Louis	United States	America's Center
August 26, 2005	Las Vegas	United States	House of Blues
August 28, 2005	San Francisco	United States	Fillmore Auditorium
August 29, 2005	Anaheim	United States	House of Blues
August 30, 2005	San Diego	United States	House of Blues
August 31, 2005	West Hollywood	United States	House of Blues
September 1, 2005	Las Vegas	United States	House of Blues
September 3, 2005	West Hollywood	United States	House of Blues

Festivals and other miscellaneous performances
^{A} WAMA Summer Jam
^{B} Taste of Chicago
^{C} Comerica TasteFest
^{D} Rochester MusicFest
^{E} Ohio State Fair
^{F} Cincinnati Jazz Festival
