= Faith Evans videography =

American singer Faith Evans has appeared in numerous music videos.

== Music videos ==
=== 1990s ===
Title	Year	Director(s)	Artist(s)
"One More Chance"	1995	Hype Williams	The Notorious B.I.G. feat. Faith Evans
"You Used to Love Me"	1995	Lionel Martin	Faith Evans
"Soon as I Get Home"	1996	Marcus Raboy	Faith Evans
"You Could Be My Boo"	1996	Unknown	Almighty RSO feat. Faith Evans
"Ain't Nobody"	1996	Unknown	Faith Evans
"I Just Can't"	1996	Marcus Raboy	Faith Evans
"Stressed Out"	1996	Michael Martin	A Tribe Called Quest feat. Faith Evans
"I'll Be Missing You"	1997	Hype Williams	Puff Daddy feat. Faith Evans & 112
"How's It Goin' Down"	1998	Hype Williams	DMX feat. Faith Evans
"Love like This"	1998	Hype Williams	Faith Evans
"All Night Long"	1999	Paul Hunter	Faith Evans feat. Puff Diddy
"Heartbreak Hotel"	1999	Kevin Bray	Whitney Houston feat. Faith Evans & Kelly Price
"Georgy Porgy"	1999	Little X, Eric Benet	Eric Benet feat. Faith Evans
"Never Gonna Let You Go"	1999	Marcus Raboy	Faith Evans
"Love Is Blind"	1999	Dave Meyers	Eve feat. Faith Evans

=== 2000s ===
Title	Year	Director(s)	Artist(s)
"Can't Believe"	2001	Chris Robinson	Faith Evans feat. Carl Thomas
"Good Life"	2001	Marcus Raboy	Faith Evans
"You Gets No Love"	2001	Chris Robinson	Faith Evans
"I Love You"	2002	Matthew Rolston	Faith Evans
"I Miss You"	2002	Chris Robinson	DMX feat. Faith Evans
"Burnin Up"	2002	Chris Robinson	Faith Evans feat. Missy Elliott, P. Diddy & Freeway
"Everyday"	2002	Benny Boom	G. Dep feat. Faith Evans
"Brown Sugar"	2002	Flaco Bey	Mos Def feat. Faith Evans
"Ma, I Don't Love Her"	2002	Little X	Clipse feat. Faith Evans
"Someday"	2002	Kevin Godley	Scarface feat. Faith Evans
"Hope"	2005	Chris Robinson	Twista feat. Faith Evans
"Again"	2005	Chris Robinson	Faith Evans
"Mesmerized"	2005	Bryan Barber	Faith Evans
"Letter to B.I.G."	2009	Va$tie	Jadakiss feat. Faith Evans

=== 2010s ===
Title	Year	Director(s)	Artist(s)
"Gone Already"	2010	Dion Watkins	Faith Evans
"Right Now"	2010	Nicole Erlich, Erik White, Ryan Pallotta	Faith Evans
"Lay with You"	2010	Erik White	El DeBarge feat. Faith Evans
"Tears of Joy"	2012	Erik White	Faith Evans
"Dumb"	2013	Bishop Moore	Faith Evans
"I Deserve It"	2014	Derek Blanks	Faith Evans feat. Missy Elliott & Sharaya J
"Good Time"	2014	James “Real Lyfe” Earl	Faith Evans feat. Problem
"Fragile"	2014	Derek Blanks	Faith Evans

=== Guest appearances ===
Title	Year	Director(s)	Artist(s)
"Whatchulookinat"	2002	Kevin Bray	Whitney Houston
"The Way You Love Me"	2010	Laurie Ann Gibson	Keri Hilson
