= Something About Faith Tour =

2010–11 concert tour by Faith Evans

- Tour by Faith Evans
- Associated album: Something About Faith
- Start date: October 5, 2010
- End date: December 31, 2011
- Legs: 3
- No. of shows: 20 in North America; 4 in Europe; 24 in total

Faith Evans concert chronology
- The First Lady Tour (2005); Something About Faith Tour (2010-11); An Evening with Faith (2012)

Something About Faith Tour is a music concert tour by American R&B/soul singer, Faith Evans. The tour supports her album, Something About Faith, visiting 30 cities in North America and additional dates in Europe. The outing started on October 5 in New York at B.B. King’s Blues Club, the date her new album was released.

== Opening Acts ==
- Donell Jones (New Orleans, Detroit)
- Jagged Edge (Detroit)
- SWV (London)
- Moments in Time (Chicago)

== Set list ==
1. "Something About Faith" (Intro)
2. "Love Like This"
3. "Reasons"
4. "You Gets No Love"
5. "Burnin' Up"
6. "I Don't Need It"
7. "You Used to Love Me"
8. "Soon as I Get Home"
9. Biggie Smalls Tribute: DJ Set Interlude (contains elements of "One More Chance", "Big Poppa", "Hypnotize" and "Juicy")
10. Medley: "Party" / "Lucky Day" / "Brown Sugar (Extra Sweet)"
11. "Can't Believe"
12. "Come Over"
13. "Never Gonna Let You Go"
14. "Stop N Go"
15. "Mesmerized"
16. "All Night Long"
17. "I Love You"
18. "Tru Love"
19. "Again"
20. "Gone Already"

== Tour dates ==
Date	City	Country	Venue
North America
October 5, 2010	New York City	United States	B.B. King's Blues Club
October 9, 2010^{[A]}	Atlanta	United States	Sweet Auburn Historic District
October 10, 2010	Charlotte	United States	Tempo
October 29, 2010	Houston	United States	Arena Theatre
November 6, 2010^{[B]}	Atlanta	United States	Georgia World Congress Center
November 14, 2010	Los Angeles	United States	Conga Room
Europe
December 4, 2010	Ascot	England	Club 1
December 5, 2010	London	England	IndigO_{2}
December 8, 2010	London	England	IndigO_{2}
December 10, 2010	Manchester	England	Manchester Academy
North America
January 20, 2011	San Francisco	United States	Mezzanine
April 9, 2011	New Orleans	United States	The Sugar Mill
April 21, 2011	Chicago	United States	Alhambra Palace
May 6, 2011^{[C]}	Jacksonville	United States	Metropolitan Park
May 27, 2011^{[D]}	Washington, D.C.	United States	The Park at Fourteenth
May 28, 2011	Detroit	United States	Detroit Opera House
May 29, 2011	Las Vegas	United States	Hard Rock Cafe
June 24, 2011^{[E]}	Ontario	United States	Citizens Business Bank Arena
August 12, 2011^{[F]}	Las Vegas	United States	Mandalay Bay Events Center
August 27, 2011^{[G]}	Portland	United States	Memorial Coliseum
October 8, 2011	Shreveport	United States	Shreveport Municipal Memorial Auditorium
November 5, 2011^{[H]}	Miami	United States	Knight Center
December 17, 2011^{[I]}	Los Angeles	United States	Nokia Theatre L.A. Live
December 31, 2011	West Hollywood	United States	Key Club

- Not all tour dates are listed

Festivals and other miscellaneous performances
^{A} Sweet Auburn Heritage Festival
^{B} For Sisters Only Expo
^{C} Budweiser Funk Fest
^{D} The Park Unplugged
^{E} Urban Legends Concert
^{F} Hillshire Farm Freedom Friday Party
^{G} Northwest Love Jam
^{H} Best of the 90s
^{I} 16th Annual House Full of Toys Benefit Concert

Cancellations and rescheduled shows

June 18, 2011	Riverside, California	Fox Performing Arts Center	Cancelled
July 29, 2011	Los Angeles, California	Gibson Amphitheatre	Cancelled
