= Courtney Anderson =

American football player (born 1980)

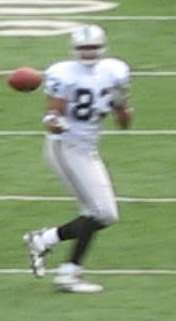
- Anderson in 2006

No. 83, 80
- Position: Tight end

Personal information
- Born: November 19, 1980 (age 45); Greenville, Texas, U.S.
- Listed height: 6 ft 6 in (1.98 m)
- Listed weight: 270 lb (122 kg)

Career information
- High school: Richmond (CA)
- College: San Jose State
- NFL draft: 2004: 7th round, 245th overall pick

Career history
- Oakland Raiders (2004–2006); Miami Dolphins (2007)*; Detroit Lions (2007); Atlanta Falcons (2007); Buffalo Bills (2008)*; Houston Texans (2009)*
- * Offseason or practice squad member only

Career NFL statistics
- Receptions: 62
- Receiving yards: 763
- Receiving touchdowns: 6
- Stats at Pro Football Reference

Courtney Jerome Anderson Sr. (born November 19, 1980) is an American former professional football player who was a tight end in the National Football League (NFL). Born in Greenville, Texas, Anderson attended high school in Richmond, California, and played college football at Contra Costa College and San Jose State University. He was selected by the Oakland Raiders in the seventh round of the 2004 NFL draft and spent three seasons with that team. Later, he was a member of the Miami Dolphins, Detroit Lions, Atlanta Falcons, Buffalo Bills and Houston Texans. He is currently a firefighter for the community of Milpitas, CA.

== Early life and college career ==
Born in Greenville, Texas, Anderson graduated from Richmond High School in California, where he lettered in football, basketball, and track and field. In the football team, Anderson was quarterback, wide receiver, and defensive linebacker in the football team. In 1998, he caught 50 passes for 1,005 yards, scored 12 touchdowns, and earned all-state honors. Anderson was a member of the 1999 Richmond Oilers basketball team coached by Ken Carter that was dramatized in the movie Coach Carter.

For two years, Anderson attended Contra Costa College. In football, he lined up at wide receiver before moving to tight end. He then transferred to San Jose State University where, in 23 games, hauled in 36 passes for 477 yards (13.3 avg.) and seven touchdowns. He also majored in sociology.

== Professional career ==
=== Oakland Raiders ===
Anderson was drafted by the Oakland Raiders in the seventh round (245th overall) of the 2004 NFL draft. In his rookie season, he made 13 catches for 175 yards and one touchdown in nine games (four of which he started); he left Week 9 with an ankle injury. The next season, Anderson played in 14 games, of which he started in 13, and caught 24 passes for 303 yards and three touchdowns. In his three seasons with Oakland, Anderson had 62 receptions for 763 yards and six touchdowns and occasionally caught passes deep midfield. The Raiders released Anderson before the 2007 preseason.

=== Miami Dolphins ===
Anderson went to training camp with the Miami Dolphins in 2007 but was released on September 1, 2007.

=== Detroit Lions ===
Anderson was signed by the Detroit Lions on September 24, 2007, to replace the injured starter Dan Campbell, whose starting position was taken by Sean McHugh. He played two games with the Lions and then was cut on October 28, 2007.

=== Atlanta Falcons ===
The Atlanta Falcons claimed Anderson off waivers on November 13, 2007, from the Lions.

=== Buffalo Bills ===
Anderson signed with the Buffalo Bills on March 10, 2008, but was released on August 30 during final cuts.

=== Houston Texans ===
After spending the 2008 regular season out of football, Anderson was signed to a future contract by the Houston Texans on January 5, 2009. He was waived by the team on April 30.
