= Coach Carter (soundtrack) =

Coach Carter: Music from the Motion Picture

Soundtrack album by various artists
- Released: January 11, 2005
- Recorded: 2004
- Genres: Hip-hop; R&B
- Length: 53:23
- Label: Capitol
- Producers: Anthology; Corner Boyz; French Spencer; Jason "Jay E" Epperson; Jukebox; Kanye West; Kwamé; Mike Caren; Needlz; Neek Rusher; The Trak Starz; Toxic; Van Hunt; Young Trey

Singles from Coach Carter: Music from the Motion Picture
- 1. "Hope" Released: March 29, 2005

Professional ratings
Review scores
Source	Rating
AllMusic	2.5/5 stars
HipHopDX	3.5/5
RapReviews	5/10

Coach Carter: Music from the Motion Picture is the soundtrack to Thomas Carter's 2005 film Coach Carter. It was released on January 11, 2005, through Capitol Records and composed of hip-hop and R&B music. Production was handled by Needlz, Corner Boyz, French Spencer, Jason "Jay E" Epperson, Jubebox, Kanye West, Kwamé, Neek Rusher, The Trak Starz, Toxic, Van Hunt, Anthology, Andrew Slater, Mike Caren, with Andrew M. Shack and Darius Jones serving as executive producers.

== Track listing ==
These songs were not featured in the film's soundtrack:

- "Untouchable" by DMX (featuring Syleena Johnson, Cross, Infa-Red, Sheek Louch and Drag-On)
- "Comin' from Where I'm From" by Anthony Hamilton
- "Get Low" by Lil' Jon & the East Side Boyz
- "Move Ya Body by Nina Sky
- "Let the Drummer Kick" by Citizen Cope

#	Title	Length	Songwriters	Producer(s)	Performer(s)
1	"All Night Long"	3:33	Jermaine Denny; Kwamé Holland	K1 Mil	Red Café
2	"No Need for Conversation"	3:38	John Jackson; Garrett Robin Hamler; Khari Cain	Needlz	Fabolous; Mike Shorey
3	"Professional"	3:36	Howard Bailey; Carl Bowers; Kai Simms; Shamar Daugherty; Alonzo Lee	The Trak Starz	Chingy; G.I.B.
4	"Southside"	4:12	Jayceon Terrell Taylor; Darryl Richardson III; Anthony Lee Torres		The Game; Lil Scrappy
5	"Roll Wit' You"	3:23	Ciara Harris; Demetrius Spencer; LaKiesha N. Miles	French Spencer	Ciara
6	"Wouldn't You Like to Ride"	3:51	Kanye West; Malik Yusef; Lonnie Lynn; Charles Hemphill	Kanye West	Kanye West; Malik Yusef; Common; JV
7	"Hope"	4:12	Carl Terrell Mitchell; Frederick Taylor; Thomas Callaway	Toxic; Mike Caren	Faith Evans; Twista
8.	"Your Love (Is the Greatest Drug I've Ever Known)"	3:33	Van Hunt; Millicent Hunt; Brandon Carter	Van Hunt; Andrew Slater	Van Hunt
9	"This One"	3:06	Krystle Kantrece Johnson; Ronald M. Jackson; Sydney Malone; Brandon R. Salaam-Bailey; Maurice Simmons	Jukebox	Ak'Sent
10	"Beauty Queen"	3:44	Mark Owens; Michael Williams; Neil Wynn; Khari Cain; Terrence Grimm	Needlz	Czar*Nok
11	"Balla"	4:07	Dedrick Rolison; Kelly Garmon; Andrew Price; Jimmy Tucker; Treyvon Green	Young Trey	Mack 10; Da Hood
12	"Time"	4:52	Ali Jones; Robert Cleveland; Tohri Harper; Ralph Distasio; Jason Epperson	Jason "Jay E" Epperson	St. Lunatics; Avery Storm
13	"What Love Can Do"	4:04	Keri Hilson; Patrick Michael Smith; Pierre J. Medor; Dwayne Nesmith	Corner Boyz	LeToya
14	"About da Game"	3:39	Tremaine Neverson; Dashawn Hamilton; Ezekiel Lewis	Neek Rusher	Trey Songz

== Personnel ==
- Anthology – Producer
- Tom Baker – Mixing Assistant
- Leslie Brathwaite – Mixing
- Mike Caren – Producer, Engineer
- Thomas Carter – Executive Producer
- Corner Boyz – Producer, Engineer, Mixing
- Canela Cox – Vocals (background)
- Claudio Cueni – Engineer, Mixing, Pro-Tools
- Kevin "KD" Davis – Mixing
- DJ Judge Mental – Scratching
- Duro – Mixing
- Jason "Jay E" Epperson – Producer
- French – Programming, Multi Instruments, Producer, Engineer, Vocal Producer
- David Gale – Executive Producer
- Brian "Big Bass" Gardner – Mastering
- Brian Garten – Mixing
- Paul Gregory – Engineer
- Candyce Handley – Soundtrack Coordination
- Jennifer Hawks – Music Supervisor
- Jean-Marie Horvat – Mixing
- Van Hunt – Producer, Performer
- Darius Jones – Soundtrack Producer
- The Jukebox – Multi Instruments, Producer
- Kwamé "K1Mil" – Producer
- Bryan Loss – Engineer
- Keith Mangels – Guitar (Bass)
- Kevin Mangini – Executive in Charge of Music
- Manny Marroquin – Engineer, Mixing
- LaKiesha Miles – Vocals (background), Vocal Producer
- Carl Nappa – Mixing
- Needlz – Producer
- Rae Nimeh – Engineer
- Neil Pogue – Mixing
- James Porte – Mixing
- Brian Robbins – Executive Producer
- Neek Rusher – Producer
- Segal – Mixing
- Andrew M. Shack – Executive Producer, Soundtrack Producer
- Sham – Multi Instruments
- Skinny Ray – Engineer
- Andrew Slater – Vocal Producer
- Ryan Stoutenborough – Guitar
- Sharla Sumpter – Executive in Charge of Music
- Troy Taylor – Producer
- Jonna Terrasi – Soundtrack Coordination
- Van Toffler – Executive Producer
- Mike Tollin – Executive Producer
- Toxic – Producer
- The Trak Starz – Producer, Engineer
- Kanye West – Producer
- Howard Willing – Engineer
- Young Trey – Producer
- Zo – Multi Instruments

== Charts ==
Chart performance
Chart (2005)	Peak position
Australian Urban Albums (ARIA)	20
Canadian Albums (Nielsen SoundScan)	37
New Zealand Albums (RMNZ)	34
US Billboard 200	25
US Soundtrack Albums (Billboard)	3
US Top R&B/Hip-Hop Albums (Billboard)	15
