= Keep the Faith (Faith Evans album) =

Studio album by Faith Evans
- Released: October 27, 1998
- Recorded: 1997–1998
- Genre: R&B
- Length: 57:41
- Labels: Bad Boy; Arista
- Producers: Sean Combs; Ron Lawrence; Stevie J; Babyface; David Foster; Chucky Thompson; J. Dub; Anthony Dent

Faith Evans chronology
Faith (1995)	Keep the Faith (1998)	Faithfully (2001)

Singles from Keep the Faith
- 1. "Love Like This" Released: September 15, 1998; 2. "All Night Long" Released: March 2, 1999; 3. "Never Gonna Let You Go" Released: August 17, 1999; 4. "Lately I" Released: November 24, 1999

Keep the Faith is the second studio album by American singer Faith Evans. It was released by Bad Boy Records on October 27, 1998, in the United States. Almost entirely written and produced by Evans, the album garnered generally mixed to positive reviews by music critics, with AllMusic noting it "without a doubt a highlight of 1990s soul-pop music." Also enjoying commercial success, it went platinum and produced the top ten singles "Love Like This" and "All Night Long," prompting Evans to start an 18-city theater tour with Dru Hill and Total the following year.

== Background ==
After signing with Bad Boy Records, Evans was invited by executive producer Sean Combs to provide backing vocals and co-write songs for Mary J. Blige's My Life (1994) and Usher's self-titled debut album (1994), prior to beginning work on her own debut project. Released in August 1995, her first studio album, Faith, was primarily a collaboration with Bad Boy's in-house production team or associate producers, most notably Chucky Thompson, Combs, and Poke & Tone. Propelled by the singles "You Used to Love Me" and "Soon as I Get Home," the album proved commercially successful, earning a platinum certification from the Recording Industry Association of America (RIAA) with 801,000 copies sold as of 1998.

Following the tragic death of her husband, rapper The Notorious B.I.G., on March 9, 1997, Combs collaborated with Evans to produce a tribute song named "I'll Be Missing You." Built around the melody of The Police's 1983 single "Every Breath You Take," the song achieved global commercial success, debuting at number one on the US Billboard Hot 100, and helped Evans gain even greater mainstream recognition. In recognition of its impact, the track earned Combs, Evans, and the group 112 the Grammy Award for Best Rap Performance by a Duo or Group in 1998. Meanwhile, Evans resumed work on her album, which she had originally begun in 1996 and had continued developing on and off. Almost entirely written and produced by her, Evans considered the album difficult to complete as she had initially felt discouraged about the progress.

== Critical reception ==
Professional ratings
Review scores
Source	Rating
AllMusic	3/5 stars
Entertainment Weekly	A−
Los Angeles Times	2.5/4 stars
Q	3/5 stars
Rolling Stone	2.5/5 stars
The Rolling Stone Album Guide	3/5 stars
Urban Latino	4/4 stars

AllMusic editor Jose F. Promis rated the album three stars out of five. He found that "Evans shines when she sings fast or mid-tempo songs, but the ballads weigh too heavily on this otherwise fine album [...] However, the classy Ms. Evans possesses a beautiful voice, is a gifted songwriter, and happily steers clear of the tacky clichés that burden so much contemporary R&B. So despite the heavy reliance on ballads, this is actually a fine album, and is without a doubt a highlight of 1990s soul-pop music." Matt Diehl from Entertainment Weekly noted that Keep the Faith "remains commercial R&B, all bedroom strings and Babyface-style acoustic accents. What sets Evans apart is that she, like her soul sista Mary J. Blige, investigates her pain in a way that contradicts the lush sonics [...] It's a far richer palette than her slicker peers offer; then again, we forget that Stevie, Marvin, and Aretha's soul was considered 'com-mercial' too. While Evans hasn't hit their heights, efforts like this give us faith that she might.

Los Angeles Times noted that "however heartfelt Evans' intentions may be in this homage to her late husband, the Notorious B.I.G., she seems more concerned with soliciting our empathy than with creating compelling R&B." Yahoo! Music critic Billy Johnson, Jr. felt that "only a few Keep the Faith songs have the potential to keep the talented vocalist at the top of the charts." Ernest Hardy from Rolling Stone felt that the album lacked songs worthy of Evans' talent. He felt thath she "deserves to be known as more than the femme fatale in some bullshit hip-hop feud, and Keep the Faith is a strong reminder that she has the talent. All she lacks are the songs." Similarly, Craig Seymour remarked in his review for Village Voice: "Though there's much great singing on Keep the Faith, there are too few great or even good songs. While the mostly self-penned tunes on her debut at least had a fluid quality befitting her dewy vocals, on Keep the Faith they just seem aimless. If you're not paying attention to every twist and turn of her spiraling melismas, the album passes by like a summer breeze, pleasant but neither distinctive nor memorable."

== Commercial performance ==
Keep the Faith debuted and peaked at number six on the US Billboard 200 in the week of November 14, 1998. Evans' first top ten album, it scored first week sales of 85,000 copies. By December 1998, the album had sold 251,000 units and 900,000 copies by October 2001 . On July 29, 1999, Keep the Faith was certified Platinum by the Recording Industry Association of America (RIAA).

== Track listing ==
Keep the Faith track listing
No.	Title	Writer(s)	Producer(s)	Length
1.	"Faith (Intro)"	Faith Evans; Jeffrey "J Dub" Walker	J Dub	0:59
2.	"Love Like This"	Evans; Sean Combs; Ron Lawrence; Schon Crawford; Clarence Emery; Bernard Edwards; Nile Rodgers	Evans; Amen-Ra; Combs	4:35
3.	"All Night Long" (featuring Puff Daddy)	Evans; Combs; Lawrence; Crawford; Emery; Todd Russaw; Todd Gaither; Bertram Reid; Galen Underwood	Evans; Amen-Ra; Combs	3:54
4.	"Sunny Days"	Evans; Walker; Anthony Dent; Lorne B. Rawls; Kenneth Stover	Dent; J Dub; Combs	4:20
5.	"Tears Away (Interlude)"	Evans; Walker	J Dub	1:41
6.	"My First Love"	Evans; Combs; Chucky Thompson; Kelly Price	Thompson; Combs	4:59
7.	"Anything You Need"	Evans; Combs; Walker	J Dub; Combs	5:59
8.	"No Way"	Evans; Walker; Price	J Dub	5:02
9.	"Life Will Pass You By"	Evans; Combs; Lawrence; Carlton Thomas; D.J. Rogers, Jr.; Richard Frierson; Michael Keith; Quinnes Parker; Daron Jones; Marvin Scandrick; Angela Bofill; Jeffrey Cohen; Narada Michael Walden	Richard Frieson; Lawrence; Combs	4:48
10.	"Keep the Faith"	Evans; Combs; Dent; Walker; Donovan Jackson; Franklin Brown	Dent; J Dub; Combs	5:02
11.	"Special Place (Interlude)"	Evans; Steven "Stevie J" Jordan	Jordan	1:01
12.	"Never Gonna Let You Go"	Babyface; Damon Thomas	Babyface; Kenya Ivey; Tavia Ivey	4:27
13.	"Stay (Interlude)"	Evans; Walker	J Dub	1:56
14.	"Caramel Kisses" (featuring 112)	Evans; Combs; Thompson; Scandrick; Keith; Parker	Thompson	4:42
15.	"Lately I"	Diane Warren; Jordan	Foster; Jordan	4:16
Total length:				57:41

Samples

- "Keep the Faith" samples "Never Alone" by Yolanda Adams
- "Life Will Pass You By" samples "Gotta Make It Up to You" by Angela Bofill
- "Love Like This" samples "Chic Cheer" by Chic
- "Sunny Days" samples "I'm Back for More" by Al Johnson and Jean Carne
- "All Night Long" samples "I Hear Music in the Streets" by Unlimited Touch

== Personnel ==
Performers and musicians

- Faith Evans – arranger, vocal arrangement, vocals, vocals (background)
- Michael Thompson – guitar
- Michael Hart Thompson – guitar
- Babyface – drum programming, keyboards, vocals (background)
- Damon Thomas – drum programming, keyboards
- Mike Mason – piano, strings
- Greg Phillinganes – piano
- Nathan East – bass guitar
- Ricky Lawson – drums
- 112 – arranger, performer, vocal arrangement
- Diddy – performer
- Kelly Price – arranger, vocal arrangement, vocals (background)
- Axel Niehaus – arranger, vocal arrangement
- Carl Thomas – vocal arrangement
- Kenya Ivey – vocals (background)
- Tavia Ivey – vocals (background)
- Lorne Rawls – arranger
- DJ Rodgers – arranger
- Mario Winans – overdubs

Technical

- Charles "Prince Charles" Alexander – engineer, mixing
- Tony Black – engineer, mixing
- Axel Niehaus – engineer, mixing
- Paul Boutin – engineer
- Tom Cassel – engineer
- Joe "Smilin' Joe" Perrera – engineer
- Rob Paustian – engineer
- Thom Russo – engineer
- Doug Wilson – engineer
- E'lyk – assistant engineer, mixing
- Jon Gass – mixing
- Tony Maserati – mixing
- Michael Patterson – editing
- Herb Powers – mastering
- Gwendolyn Niles – project manager
- Faith Evans – executive producer, producer
- Sean "Puffy" Combs – executive producer, producer
- Deric "D-Dot" Angelettie – associate executive producer
- Babyface – producer
- Mike Mason – producer
- Ron Lawrence – producer
- Carl Thompson – producer
- David Foster – producer, vocal producer
- Richard "Younglord" Frierson – producer
- Todd Russaw – associate executive producer
- Jesse Rivera – project coordinator
- Albert Watson – photography
- Gwynnis Mosby – make-up
- Klya Wright – hair stylist

== Charts ==
=== Weekly charts ===
Weekly chart performance for Keep the Faith
Chart (1998)	Peak position
Canadian R&B Albums (Nielsen SoundScan)	8
UK Albums (Official Charts)	69
UK R&B Albums (Official Charts)	7
US Billboard 200	6
US Top R&B/Hip-Hop Albums (Billboard)	3

=== Year-end charts ===
Year-end chart performance for Keep the Faith
Chart (1999)	Position
US Billboard 200	148
US Top R&B/Hip-Hop Albums (Billboard)	45

== Certifications ==
Certifications for Keep the Faith
Region	Certification	Certified units/sales
United States (RIAA)	Platinum	1,000,000^{^}
^{^} Shipments figures based on certification alone.
