= The First Lady (Faith Evans album) =

Studio album by Faith Evans
- Released: April 5, 2005
- Genre: R&B
- Length: 56:13
- Label: Capitol
- Producers: Todd Russaw; Andrew Shack; Mike Caren; Carvin & Ivan; Bryan Michael Cox; Jermaine Dupri; Faith Evans; Andre Johnsson; The Neptunes; The Original Heads; Todd Russaw; Andrew Slater; Johnnie Smith; Scott Storch; Chucky Thompson; Toxic; Mario Winans

Faith Evans chronology
Faithfully (2001)	The First Lady (2005)	A Faithful Christmas (2005)

Singles from The First lady
- 1. "Again" Released: February 8, 2005; 2. "Mesmerized" Released: April 25, 2005; 3. "Tru Love" Released: October 25, 2005

The First Lady is the fourth studio album by American singer Faith Evans. Released by Capitol Records, it marked Evans' debut on the EMI subsidiary, following her departure from Bad Boy Records in 2003. Despite this, the singer reunited with many of her frequent contributors to work on the album, including The Neptunes, Chucky Thompson, and Mario Winans. Duo Carvin & Ivan of Karma Productions wrote and produced the predominant part of all songs that were included in the final track listing.

Generally well received by critics, The First Lady debuted at number two on the US Billboard 200 and number one on the US Top R&B/Hip-Hop Albums with opening week sales of 157,000 units. It remains Evans' highest ranking album on either chart, and the best first week sales of her career. By the end of 2005, the album was certified gold by the Recording Industry Association of America, selling more than 600,000 copies in the United States alone. In support of the album, Evans embarked on a concert tour, The First Lady Tour, in the United States and Europe in mid-2005. In 2006, The First Lady was nominated for Best Female R&B/Soul Album at the 20th Soul Train Music Awards.

== Background and release ==
Evans' third album with Bad Boy Records, named Faithfully (2001), was released in November 2001. Her first project with husband Todd Russaw as executive producer and creative partner, the album scored number 14 on the US Billboard 200 chart and number two on the Top R&B/Hip-Hop Albums chart, eventually being certified platinum, but yielded moderately successful singles, with the Jennifer Lopez-written "I Love You" becoming the only top twenty entry. Released amid Bad Boy Records' transition from distributor Arista Records to Universal, Evans felt Faithfully received minimum assistance by the company, and during 2004, she finally decided to end her business with Bad Boy as she was convinced Combs couldn't improve her career any more due to his other commitments.

After leaving Bad Boy, Evans contracted with Capitol Records, becoming the first contemporary R&B artist to do so, and started work on her fourth studio album The First Lady. As opposed to having an in-house team of producers who supplied most of the previous material, she and Russaw were able to gain more creative control of the album and consulted producers such as Bryan-Michael Cox, Jermaine Dupri, Mike Caren, Pharrell Williams, and Chucky Thompson to contribute to it. The title of the album was inspired by Evans' original nickname with Bad Boy Records, "The First Lady of Bad Boy." On her decision to use a truncated version of the name Diddy dubbed her with, Evans commented: "[The nickname] did carry over, 'cause I'm the first artist in my genre at Capitol," she said. "More so, I chose the title The First Lady because a lot of my personality reminds me of people like Jacqueline Kennedy Onassis and Hillary Clinton. [...] Of course, they go through things, 'cause they're human like all of us. But when you see the first lady, you regard her [as] being the first lady. [...] I've made it my business to try and handle certain turbulence in my life with a certain dignity and [remain] ladylike."

== Promotion ==
=== Singles ===
"Again," co-written and produced by Ivan Barias and Carvin Haggins, was released by Capitol Records as the lead single from The First Lady on February 7, 2005, Addressing Evans's 2004 arrest for drug possession, the song peaked at number 47 on the US Billboard Hot 100, while also reaching number 12 on the UK Singles Chart and number seven on the US Hot R&B/Hip-Hop Songs chart. "Mesmerized," an uptempo funk song that was produced by Andre "AJ" Johnson, Russaw, and Chucky Thompson, was issued as the album's second single on June 13, 2005. It became a top 20 hit in the Netherlands, while a remix of the song, produced by English house duo Freemasons, reached number one on the US Dance Club Songs chart. R&B ballad "Tru Love," produced by Bryan Michael Cox and Jermaine Dupri and co-written by Johntá Austin, was released as the album's third and final single in October 2005 and reached number 27 on the US Billboard Hot R&B/Hip-Hop Songs chart.

=== Live performances ===
In support of the album, Evans embarked on the tour at the WAMO Summer Jam concert in Pittsburgh, Pennsylvania on June 18, 2005, where she was joined by singer Teairra Mari and rappers Master P, Common, and Cassidy. The American leg of the tour concluded at the House of Blues in West Hollywood, California on August 31, 2005, and was supported by opening acts Anthony David and Keke Wyatt. Kameelah Williams, former lead singer of the R&B group 702, served as a backing vocalist during the concerts.

== Critical reception ==
Professional ratings
Aggregate scores
Source	Rating
Metacritic	72/100
Review scores
Source	Rating
AllMusic	4/5 stars
Entertainment Weekly	B+
The Guardian	3/5 stars
musicOMH	1.5/5 stars
Paste	8/10
PopMatters	7/10
Rolling Stone	3.5/5 stars
Slant	3/5 stars
Uncut	3/5 stars
USA Today	3/4 stars

The First Lady received positive reviews from most music critics upon its release. At Metacritic, which assigns a normalized rating out of 100 to reviews from mainstream critics, the album received an average score of 72, based on 17 reviews, which indicates "generally favorable reviews". In his review for Allmusic, Andy Kellman wrote that "if there was any creative block during [Evans'] time away, it doesn't show. In fact, The First Lady proves that she only gets better with time, as she goes through more ups and downs and continues to absorb her inspirations." He called the first four tracks the highlights of the album and went on to praise The First Lady, calling it as "well-rounded as an R&B album gets, regardless of the age it's part of." It smartly incorporates throwback aspects into state-of-the-art pop-soul." Belinda Boakye from The Situation complimented the "unfailing spirit and soul" on the album, and commented that "this long anticipated album marks a metamorphosis for Faith Evans into a state of musical autonomy. With 52 minutes of silky vocals and a variation of infectious beats and slow sultry rhythm and blues, this record has all the ingredients needed making it emulate the class and tightly toned sound of Evans’ new physical appearance."

Greg Tate from The Village Voice called The First Lady Evans' "tightest set yet — song for song, production is crisp, ingenious, and bumping; lyrics meet the Chaka Khan criteria in communicating a complete thought; and Evans, often mistaken for a Blige without pitch issues, owns her emotions and isn't afraid to paint romantic pictures of them that leave pathos for the tabloids." Billboard editor Gail Mitchell wrote: "By turns playful, sexy, soulful, funky and passionate, Evans showcases the full range of her talents on her most consistent effort yet." Raymond Fiore, writing for Entertainment Weekly, found that while the material on the album was not as stellar as on 2001's Faithfully, The First Lady's "finest moments find Evans frolicking in sunnier '70s soul soundscapes." Rolling Stone's Barry Walters remarked that Evans' "fourth album celebrates Evans' freedom from P. Diddy's Bad Boy label with a classier, classic-minded variant on her usual club anthems and groove ballads." He felt that The First Lady was "more remarkable for its warm reliability. Having been dealt more than her share of drama, Evans avoids attention-grabbing gimmickry. She's kept the faith, and that is enough." Joe Warminsky from The Washington Post gave it a positive review, stating, "No further proof is needed than The First Lady, a CD that sounds remarkably humble despite its title [...] On The First Lady it's the stability that counts."

Blogcritics also gave it a favorable review, stating that it "is a musical mood ring, encapsulating and displaying the last ten years of her life. It’s not all reflective, however, as there are plenty of party worthy tracks spread between the affecting intensity and veteran of the game vocals. [...] Evans has released a remarkable album with wide appeal and emotional depth for the more cautious listeners. It doesn’t transcend genres or attempt to reconstruct R&B, but First Lady will surely impress those with a taste for evocative bluesy vocals, dance numbers, and solid slow jams." Tom Moon from Blender called The First Lady an "intermittently great fourth album [...] with Evans rejiggering her sordid autobiography into heartwarming tales of learning from mistakes and overcoming adversity." Sal Cinquemani from Slant gave the album three out of five stars and said "The First Lady is decidedly less "street," boasting a more adult sound that's timely enough to keep longtime fans and possibly even earn new ones." Though he dismissed songs such as "Ever Wonder," "Until You Came" and "Stop N Go," which he declared as either "cloying" or "sappy," he found that the album was "a mark of growth for Evans" following her slip from Bad Boy and Sean "Diddy" Combs. Orlando Lima, writing for Vibe, also gave the album three-and-a-half out of five stars and noted that while "Evans can still finesse notes," the album had a tendency to backtracking, "covering much of the same ground as her previous offering [...] instead of continually pushing her sound into the future." He found that Evans yet had to "sway the R&B world with the weight of say, Sade's Lovers Rock or Mary J. Blige's My Life."

== Commercial performance ==
Despite the somewhat average commercial performance of the album's leading single, "Again," The First Lady debuted and peaked at number two on the Billboard 200, the official albums chart in the United States, on April 23, 2005. The album sold 157,000 units in its first week of release, falling just 8,000 copies short of the top slot and 50 Cent's The Massacre. Despite this, the album gave Evans her best sales figures of her career yet, marking both her highest-selling debut and best ever first-week sales. In addition, The First Lady became her first album to reach number-one on the Top R&B/Hip-Hop Albums chart, surpassing The Massacre. By the end of 2005, the album was certified gold by the Recording Industry Association of America (RIAA), and became the 158th best-selling album of that year in the US.

== Track listing ==
The First Lady track listing
No.	Title	Writer(s)	Producer(s)	Length
1.	"Goin' Out" (featuring Pharrell & Pusha T)	Pharrell Williams; Terrence Thornton	The Neptunes	4:06
2.	"Again"	Evans; Carvin Haggins; Ivan Barias; Venus Dodson; Jerry Harris	Carvin & Ivan	3:18
3.	"I Don't Need It"	Evans; Bussacco; Haggins; Barias; Dexter Wansel; Cynthia Biggs	Carvin & Ivan	3:48
4.	"Stop N Go"	Evans; Haggins; Barias; Jay Shawn Smith; Johnnie Smith	Carvin & Ivan; Johnnie "Smurf" Smith*	4:15
5.	"Mesmerized"	Evans; Stephanie Johnson; Kameelah Williams; Todd Russaw; Carl Thompson; Andre "AJ" Johnson; Homer Banks; Bettye Crutcher; Don Davis; Raymond Jackson; George Benson; Donald Sebesky	Johnson; Russaw; Chucky Thompson	4:10
6.	"Tru Love"	Evans; Jermaine Dupri; Johnta Austin; Bryan Michael Cox	Dupri; Cox	3:41
7.	"Jealous"	Evans; Haggins; Barias; Ben Briggs; Russaw; Bussacco; Laura Barraza	Carvin & Ivan	3:28
8.	"Ever Wonder" (featuring Mario Winans)	Evans; Winans; Russaw	Winans	3:38
9.	"Catching Feelings"	Evans; Briggs; Russaw; Cox; Patrice Stewart	Cox; Evans^{[A]}	4:39
10.	"Get Over You"	Evans; Haggins; Bussacco; Barias; Johnnie Smith	Carvin & Ivan; Smith	3:58
11.	"Until You Came"	Evans; Haggins; Barias; Jay Shawn Smith; Johnnie Smith	Carvin & Ivan	4:45
12.	"Lucky Day"	Evans; William Prince; Rodney Morgan; Harley White Jr.; Douglas Antoine; Briggs; Michael Jamison	Evans; The Original Heads	4:07
13.	"Hope" (with Twista)	Carl Mitchell; Fredrick Taylor; Thomas Callaway	Toxic; Mike Caren; Andrew Slater	4:14

Japanese bonus track
No.	Title	Writer(s)	Producer(s)	Length
14.	"Do My Thang"	Scott Storch	Storch	3:43

Notes

- ^{^[A]} denotes co-producer

Sample credits

- "Again" contains samples of "Genuine", written by Jerry Harris and Venus Dodson, performed by The Whatnauts.
- "I Don't Need It" contains elements of "Nights Over Egypt", written by Dexter Wansel and Cynthia Biggs, performed by The Jones Girls.
- "Mesmerized" contains interpolations from "Who's Making Love", written by Homer Banks, Bettye Crutcher, Don Davis and Raymond Jackson, performed by Johnnie Taylor, and "Footin' It", written by George Benson and Donald Sebesky, performed by Benson.
- "Jealous" contains a sample of "Esta Noche La Paso Contigo", written by Laura Barraza, performed by Los Ángeles Negros.

== Credits and personnel ==
- Tony Aliperti – guitar
- Ben Briggs – engineer
- Russ Brown – guitar
- Matt Cappy – trumpet
- Mike Caren – engineer
- Andrew Coleman – engineer
- Duro – mixing
- Bryan Ellis – assistant engineer
- Serban Ghenea – mixing
- Carvin Haggins – engineer
- Eric Hunter – engineer
- Manny Marroquin – mixing
- Rod Morgan – keyboard
- Todd Russaw – executive producer
- Andrew M. Shack – executive producer
- Andrew Slater – vocal producer
- Jay Shawn Smith – vocal assistance
- Frank Sutton – engineer
- Phil Tan – mixing
- Brad Todd – engineer, mixing
- Harley White – bass
- Howard Willing – engineer

== Charts ==
=== Weekly charts ===
Weekly chart performance for The First Lady
Chart (2005)	Peak position
Australian Hitseekers Albums (ARIA)	10
Australian Urban Albums (ARIA)	27
Canadian Albums (Nielsen SoundScan)	53
Scottish Albums (Official Charts)	76
Swiss Albums (Schweizer Hitparade)	89
UK Albums (Official Charts)	22
UK R&B Albums (Official Charts)	4
US Billboard 200	2
US Top R&B/Hip-Hop Albums (Billboard)	1

=== Year-end charts ===
Year-end chart performance for The First Lady
Chart (2005)	Position
US Billboard 200	158
US Top R&B/Hip-Hop Albums (Billboard)	30

== Certifications ==
Certifications for The First Lady
Region	Certification	Certified units/sales
United States (RIAA)	Gold	500,000^{^}
^{^} Shipments figures based on certification alone.

== See also ==
- List of Billboard number-one R&B/hip-hop albums of 2005
