= Hope (Twista song) =

2004 single by Twista

Single by Twista featuring Cee Lo Green or Faith Evans

from the album Coach Carter: Music from the Motion Picture
- Released: November 22, 2004
- Genre: R&B
- Length: 4:12
- Label: Capitol
- Songwriters: Carl Terrell Mitchell; Frederick Taylor; Thomas Calloway; C. Morton
- Producer: Toxic

Twista singles chronology
"Let's Go" (2004)	"Hope" (2004)	"Gotta Make It" (2005)

Faith Evans singles chronology
"Alone in This World" (2002)	"Hope" (2004)	"Again" (2005)

"Hope" is a song by American rapper Twista from the soundtrack of the 2005 movie Coach Carter. Featuring singer Faith Evans who performs the chorus, the song mainly focuses on Twista's view on the war on terrorism. The version featuring Faith Evans can also be found on her album The First Lady. The song was released to US rhythmic and urban radio on November 22, 2004. The original version of the song appears on Twista's Kamikaze album and features CeeLo Green instead of Faith Evans.

== Music video ==
The music video of the song, in a typical promotional music video fashion, features clips of the film Coach Carter. The video utilizes graphic design throughout, mostly along the main theme of tattoo artwork flowing and transforming into real objects, an example being the tattoo picture on a man's arm turning into a real picture. It also incorporates scenes from the film and include several characters from the movie, including Samuel L. Jackson.

== Track listings ==
UK CD single

1. "Hope" (radio edit)
2. "Hope" (clean)
3. "Hope" (instrumental)
4. "Hope" (video)

European CD single

1. "Hope" (radio edit)
2. "Hope" (instrumental)

Australian CD single

1. "Hope" (radio edit)
2. "Hope" (clean)
3. "Hope" (a cappella)

== Charts ==
Chart (2005)	Peak position
Australia (ARIA)	48
Australian Urban (ARIA)	16
Belgium (Ultratip Bubbling Under Flanders)	9
Finland (Suomen virallinen lista)	14
Ireland (IRMA)	38
New Zealand (Recorded Music NZ)	15
Scottish Singles Sales (Official Charts)	45
UK Singles (Official Charts)	25
UK Hip Hop/R&B (Official Charts)	7
US Billboard Hot 100	31
US Hot R&B/Hip-Hop Songs (Billboard)	24
US Hot Rap Songs (Billboard)	17
US Rhythmic Airplay (Billboard)	27

== Certifications ==
Certifications for "Hope"
Region	Certification	Certified units/sales
New Zealand (RMNZ)	Platinum	30,000^{‡}
^{‡} Sales+streaming figures based on certification alone.

== Release history ==
Region	Date	Format(s)	Label(s)	Ref.
United States	November 22, 2004	Rhythmic contemporary; urban radio	Capitol	
United States	January 4, 2005	Contemporary hit radio	Capitol	
United Kingdom	March 28, 2005	CD	Capitol	
Australia	April 18, 2005	CD	Capitol	

== Cover versions ==
Chamillionaire did a remix to this song titled "I Wish". On May 18, 2014, over nine years after its original release, the song re-entered the UK Singles Chart at number 39 after it was covered by Bars and Melody on Britain's Got Talent the previous weekend. After the show, the duo released their version of "Hope" (retitled "Hopeful") as their debut single.
