= Lately I =

1999 single by Faith Evans

Single by Faith Evans

from the album Keep the Faith
- Released: October 12, 1999
- Length: 4:18
- Label: Bad Boy; Arista
- Songwriters: Steven Jordan; Diane Warren
- Producer: David Foster

Faith Evans singles chronology
"Never Gonna Let You Go" (1999)	"Lately I" (1999)	"Love Is Blind" (1999)

"Lately I" is a song by American singer Faith Evans. It was written by Diane Warren and Steven "Stevie J" Jordan for her second studio album Keep the Faith (1998), while production was helmed by David Foster, with Stevie J co-producing and Mike Mason providing additional production. The song was released as the album's fourth and final single in October 1999 and reached number 78 on the US Billboard Hot R&B Singles & Tracks chart.

== Track listings ==
CD single
No.	Title	Producer(s)	Length
1.	"Lately I" (PD version)	Sean "Puffy" Combs; J-Dub	4:00
2.	"Lately I" (album version)	David Foster; Stevie J^{[A]}; Mike Mason^{[B]}	4:17
3.	"Lately I" (PD version instrumental)	Combs; J-Dub	4:47
4.	"Lately I" (Call Out Research Hook #1)		0:10
5.	"Lately I" (Call Out Research Hook #2)		0:10

Notes

- ^{^[A]} denotes co-producer
- ^{^[B]} denotes additional producer

== Credits and personnel ==
Personnel are adapted from the liner notes of Keep the Faith.

- Tony Black – mixing
- Felipe Eigueta – recording
- Faith Evans – arrangement, vocals
- David Foster – production
- Stevie J – co-production, mixing, writing
- Mike Mason – additional production, instruments
- Diane Warren – writing

== Charts ==
Chart (1999)	Peak position
US Hot R&B/Hip-Hop Songs (Billboard)	78
