= Richmond High School (Richmond, California) =

Public high school in California, United States

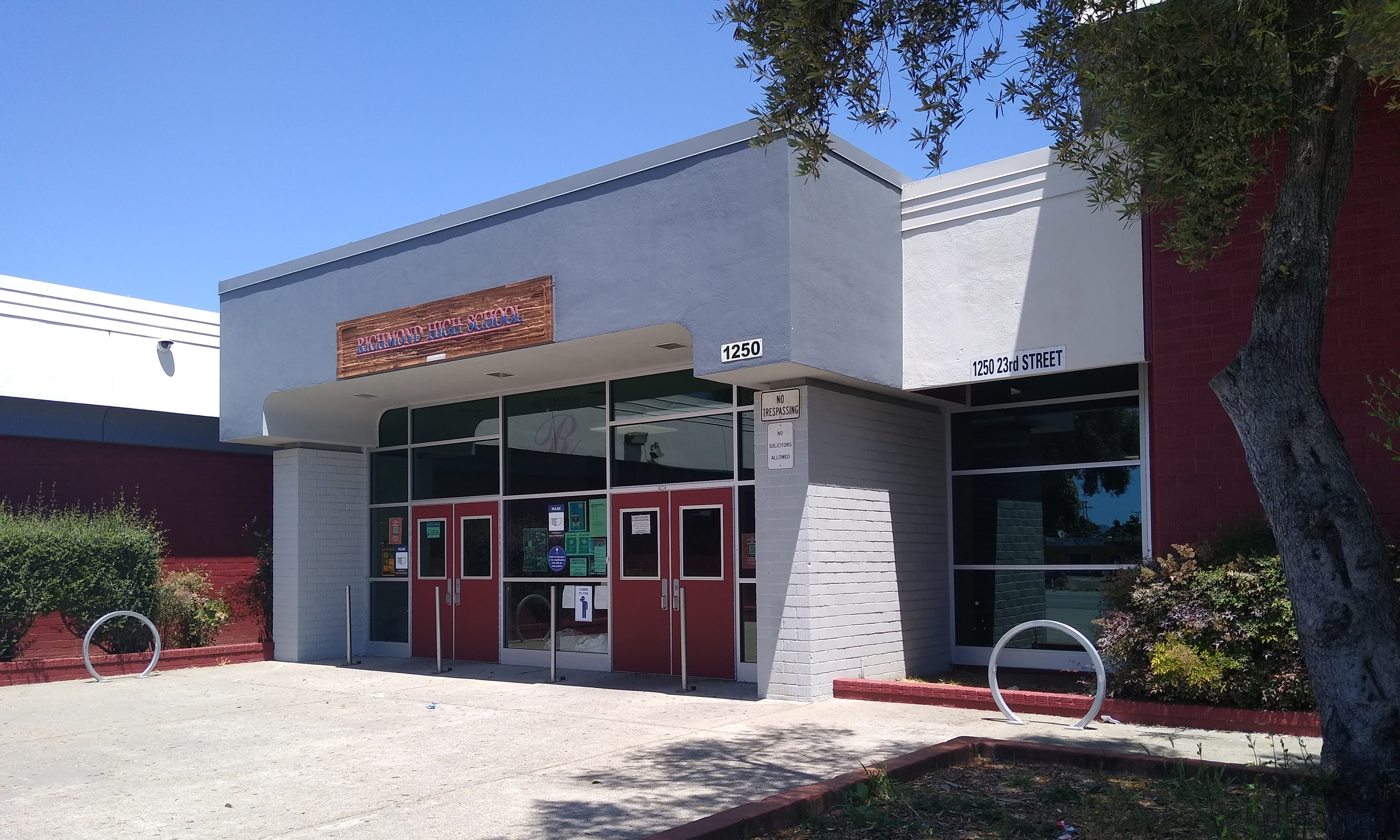

Location
- 1250 23rd Street; Richmond, California 94804; United States; 37.9518682°N 122.3421929°W

Information
- Type: Public
- Established: 1907
- School district: West Contra Costa Unified School District
- Principal: José A. De León
- Teaching staff: 69.52 (FTE)
- Grades: 9-12
- Enrollment: 1,341 (2023–2024)
- Student to teacher ratio: 19.29
- Colors: Red and Blue
- Athletics conference: CIF North Coast Section - ACCAL
- Sports: Baseball, basketball, volleyball, football, soccer, badminton, tennis, swimming
- Team name: Oilers
- Website: Richmond High School

Richmond High School (RHS) is a secondary school located in Richmond, California, United States. It is part of the West Contra Costa Unified School District (WCCUSD) and serves half of North Richmond and San Pablo.

== History ==
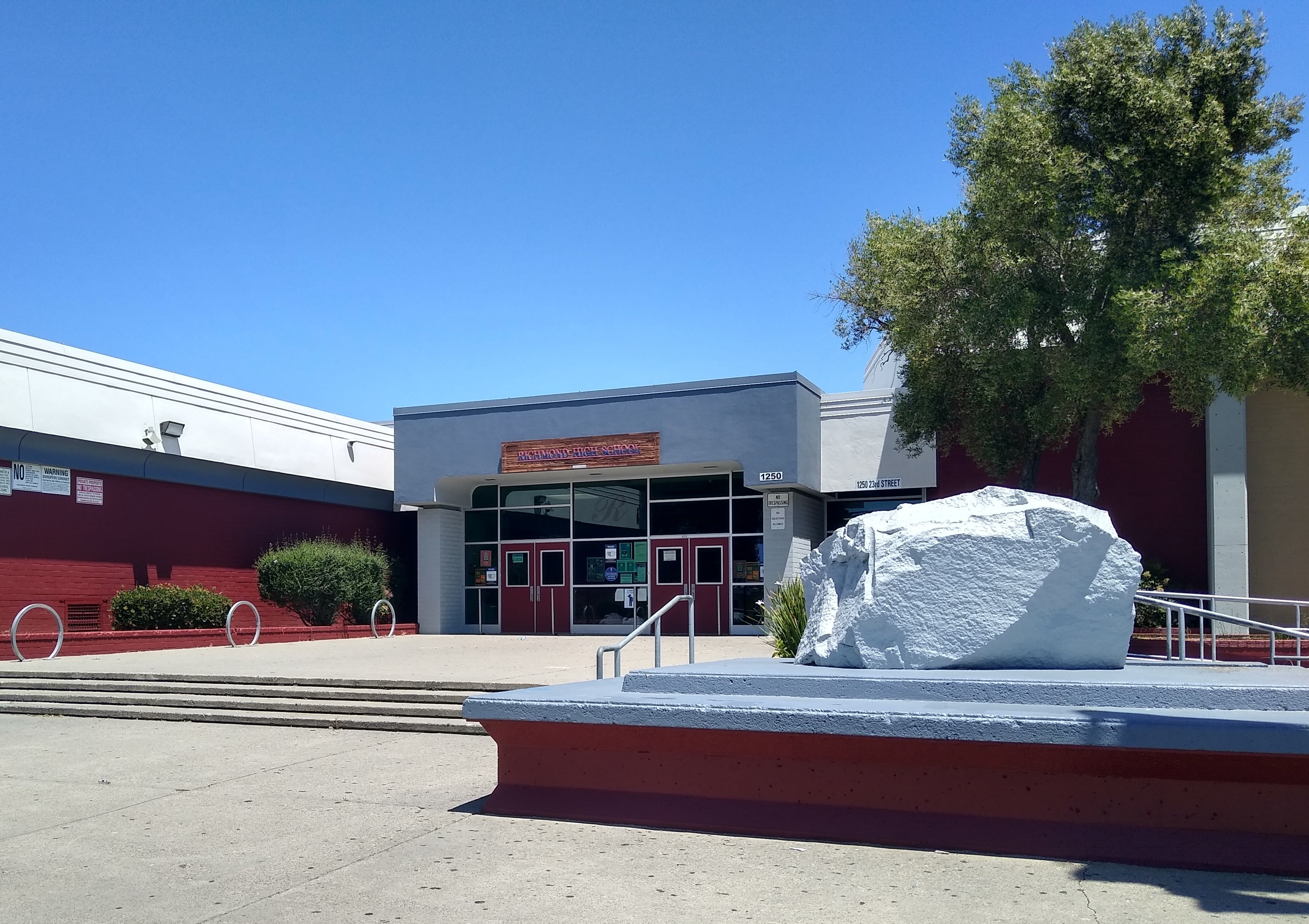
Richmond High School in 2023

Richmond High School (Formally known as Richmond Union High School) opened on August 5, 1907, in a two-room building on Standard Avenue with 36 students, three teachers, one principal, and one supervising principal. In 1908 a new building was erected for US$85,000 (equivalent to $2,900,000 in 2025) on 23rd Street near Macdonald Avenue. It serviced students in a 34 square mile radius; it currently services half of North Richmond, south of Parr Blvd., and part of the Iron Triangle.

On August 13, 1928, Richmond High School opened at its present location with 859 students. The building had two main features: a tower that resembled the tower at the University of California and the “rock”, the symbol of the school’s strong foundation. It was the only high school for students from five surrounding cities and five unincorporated areas.

In the 1960s the old building was deemed unsafe, and the students and staff were relocated to two different campuses for a few years until the new school was built on the site. It reopened in 1968: the tower was removed but the “rock” remained. Since its reopening in 1969 the building has undergone some interior changes to the main building as teachers felt they could not teach in an open court situation. Walls were added to divide large spaces into contained classrooms. Currently, Richmond High School is one of six comprehensive high schools that serves the students of the inner city of Richmond and San Pablo.

=== Crime ===
In 2009 a student was raped on the school property over a period of hours by multiple individuals. Six men were imprisoned for the attack. The incident received national publicity.

In 2019 a P.E. teacher who worked at the school was arrested for an inappropriate relationship with an underage student, to which he pled guilty.

== Student demographics ==
According to Richmond High School's annually published School Accountability Report Card (SARC), the school has a predominantly Hispanic or Latino student base, accounting for 76.43% of its total enrollment. The SARC report also cites that 75% of the student base is "socioeconomically disadvantaged", with 54% designated as "English learners".

== Academics ==
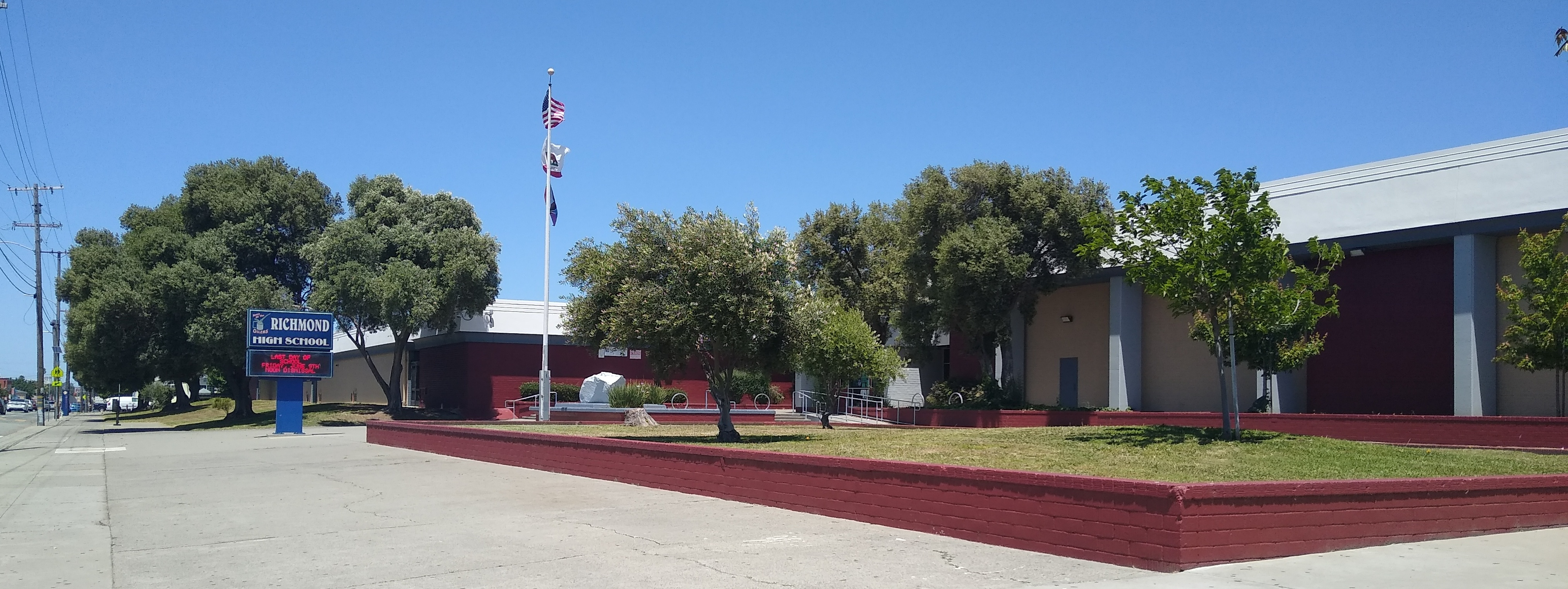
Richmond High School

Compared with other schools in the district with similar demographics, Richmond High School students are higher achievers. This is in part the result of the implementation of a system of Smaller Learning Communities, also called academies. Presently there are five separate academies: Multimedia, Law, Health, Engineering, and Creative & Performing Arts. Three of these academies are certified by the California Partnership Academies arm of the California Department of Education. Students choose an academy based on their interests and are provided with integrated curriculum project-based learning opportunities, career technical elective classes, teachers with a common preparation period, internships, and mentors. Academies handle all but the most serious discipline problems.

According to the California School Dashboard report for 2019, Richmond high students scored 38.4 points below average for English Language Arts and 115.2 points below average in Mathematics. They reported an 84.1% graduation rate for 2019.

Richmond High School competes in the FIRST Robotics Competition as Team 841, the "Biomechs".

== RHS band ==
Richmond High School has a fully functional music program and marching band. RHS' modern music programs were created by Music Department Director Andrew Wilke. The band performs at many events during the school year such as rallies and all of the home football games, Chinese New Year Parade in San Francisco, the El Sobrante Stroll, and the Richmond City Cinco de Mayo Parade. An anonymous donor provided the band with all new instruments in 2017. The RHS Oilers Marching Band participated in the Santa Cruz band review in 2018, 2019 and 2021. The Drumline also won 1st place in 2021, cadence led by Itzayana Carlon and Andrea Mata.

== Athletics ==
=== Basketball ===
Basketball is prominent at RHS and a movie, Coach Carter, was based on Ken Carter, who coached the program in the 1990s.

== Notable alumni ==
- Courtney Anderson, professional football player
- Bruno Banducci (1921–1985), professional football player with the Philadelphia Eagles and San Francisco 49ers
- Ken Carter, former basketball coach at Richmond, subject of the 2005 film Coach Carter
- Eli Holman, professional basketball player
- Mike Farmer, professional basketball player
- Grant Imahara, engineer, television personality on MythBusters
- Wendell McKines, professional basketball player
- Jim Landis, centerfielder primarily for the Chicago White Sox
- Louis A. Mackey, linebacker for the Dallas Cowboys
- Jason Becker, virtuosic guitarist with ALS
