= Faithfully (Faith Evans album) =

Studio album by Faith Evans
- Released: November 6, 2001
- Length: 61:19
- Labels: Bad Boy; Arista
- Producers: Sean Combs; Battlecat; Bink; Buckwild; Hozay Clowney; Kip Collins; Faith Evans; Havoc; The Neptunes; Vada Nobles; Todd Russaw; Michaelangelo Saulsberry; Chucky Thompson; Mario Winans

Faith Evans chronology
Keep the Faith (1998)	Faithfully (2001)	The First Lady (2005)

Singles from Faithfully
- 1. "You Gets No Love" Released: July 17, 2001; 2. "I Love You" Released: February 19, 2002; 3. "Burnin' Up" Released: March 15, 2002; 4. "Alone in This World" Released: April 6, 2002

Faithfully is the third studio album by American singer Faith Evans. It was released by Bad Boy Records on November 6, 2001, in the United States. A reflection of her musical studies, Evans was inspired by a variety of classic R&B, pop, rock, and jazz artists such as Chicago, S.O.S. Band, Ella Fitzgerald, and Sarah Vaughn during the production of Faithfully. The result, a sample-heavy album, which the label described as "old school flavored", features production by Mario Winans, Buckwild, Vada Nobles, Michael Angelo Saulsberry, the Neptunes, Battlecat, and others, with material ranging from ballads to dance tracks that built upon the contemporary R&B, funk and hip hop genres.

The album earned generally favorable reviews from most critics who called it her best effort yet, though others were critical with its length and the amount of ballads. It received a Grammy Award nomination for Best Contemporary R&B Album and debuted and peaked at number 14 on the US Billboard 200, selling 101,000 copies in its first week, and went on to sell more than 500,000 copies, eventually reaching Gold status in the United States. Faithfully spawned four total singles, including "You Gets No Love", "I Love You" and "Burnin' Up". Faithfully was Evans' last album to be recorded under the Bad Boy imprint before her departure in 2003.

== Recording ==
Evans worked closely with her husband and manager Todd Russaw on her third album. Before recording songs, the pair spent a year studying the work of classic R&B, pop, rock, and jazz artists such as Steely Dan, Michael Franks, Chicago, S.O.S. Band, Ella Fitzgerald, Sarah Vaughn and others, sitting around and playing them to learn about their techniques and performances. With her label Bad Boy Records nearing transition from distributor Arista Records to Universal Music and mentor Sean "P. Diddy" Combs being involved in several projects, including his second album Forever (1999), Evans and Russaw started working on new songs their own. After sending them to Combs, he urged them to come to Miami to start recording sessions for the album with him and his team, which Evans called "really enjoyable".

While Combs and in-house producer Mario Winans would craft the majority of the album production, Evans also collaborated with Battlecat, Bink, Buckwild, Hozay Clowney, Kip Collins, Havoc, The Neptunes, Vada Nobles, Michaelangelo Saulsberry, and frequent contributor Chucky Thompson on Faithfully. Producer duo Jimmy Jam & Terry Lewis were also asked to contribute to Faithfully but declined after hearing previously produced material which they found too good to come up with better material. While it took almost two years to finish Faithfully, Evans noted in a 2001 interview with MTV News that it reflected her music studies of the past five years, saying: "It took months and months of studying the songs, going back, putting in the elements. The feel is 'Faith has grown.' That's what I hope people get from it. I just been trying to get my history together." The album title borrows from the same-titled album track.

== Critical reception ==
Professional ratings
Review scores
Source	Rating
AllMusic	4.5/5 stars
Entertainment Weekly	A−
The Guardian	3/5 stars
The Independent	3/5 stars
NME	3/5 stars
Robert Christgau	(dud)
The Rolling Stone Album Guide	3.5/5 stars
Yahoo! Music UK	6/10

AllMusic editor Stephen Thomas Erlewine called the album "her grittiest, funkiest, best record to date." While he found that it runs too long, Erlewine also noted that "Faithfully gels better than any previous Faith Evans record, in large part because so much of it is devoted to hard-edged, funky dance numbers [...] It is rich with vibrant songs, lively production, and Evans' best singing to date on what ultimately is not just her best album." The Independent declared "Faithfully, by some distance Evans's most impressive album." The newspaper found that "the album has a far broader range than her previous releases," with "Evans's voice [dominating] proceedings." Entertainment Weekly critic Craig Seymour wrote that "on her third and most accomplished album, Evans uses lush '70s soul orchestrations for her ballads about love's joys and hardships. Her vocals range from earthy gospel-schooled cries to breathy ethereal coos." Billboard found that Faithfully was "a much stronger project than her previous outing", calling it "flavorful."

Keysha Davis from BBC Music wrote that "Evans provides all flavours for a variety of listeners on Faithfully. If this fails to hit the mainstream charts, it will definitely go down as a street classic." Tracey E. Hopkins from Rolling Stone noted "the disc's minimalist, old-school soul production style [that] helps pushing [Evans'] pulpit-honed, honey-glazed vocals to the fore." She felt that "with her third disc, the gospel, jazz and hip-hop sprinkled Faithfully, Evans continues to challenge Blige's now drama-free reign." People remarked that "keeping one foot in both the hip-hop and R&B worlds, Evans uses her gritty, gospel-informed alto to deftly mix components from the street and the church, bringing in guest rappers Loon and P. Diddy for two songs. But when she goes soulfully solo on the jazzy numbers "Do Your Time" and "Love Can't Hide," it's clear that this is Evans's party." Christian Ward from NME wrote that Faithfully is "better than we might've expected" and called it "half a good album," feeling that the "final stretch is a long haul, everything getting mid-tempo and warbly." Similarly, The Guardian's Caroline Sullivan found that Evans "sounds suitably rejuvenated" on the album, "teasing some memorable moments out of a collection of old-school love songs" but also noted that "the let down is the preponderance of generic ballads, most of which are simply unworthy of such a luscious voice."

== Commercial performance ==
Faithfully debuted and peaked at number 14 on the US Billboard 200 chart, selling 101,000 copies in its first week. This marked Evans' highest opening sales up to then. On Billboard's component charts, it reached number two on the Top R&B/Hip-Hop Albums chart. On January 10, 2002, Faithfully was certified gold by the Recording Industry Association of America (RIAA) for the shipment figures of over 500,000 copies. By April 2005, the album had sold more than 834,000 copies domestically.

== Track listing ==
Faithfully track listing
No.	Title	Writer(s)	Producer(s)	Length
1.	"Intro"	Faith Evans; Roosevelt Harrell III	Bink; Harve Pierre^{[A]}	0:52
2.	"Alone in This World"	Evans; Sean Combs; Mechalie Jamison; Michael Carlos Jones; Jack Knight; Herbert Magidson; Nashiem Myrick; Christopher Wallace; Mario Winans; Allie Wrubel	P. Diddy; Winans	3:53
3.	"You Gets No Love" (featuring P. Diddy & Loon)	Evans; Tevell Coleman; Jamison; Michaelangelo Saulsberry; Kameelah Williams; Andre Wilson	Saulsberry; Evans^{[B]}	4:01
4.	"Burnin' Up"	Evans; Chauncey Hawkins; Chad Hugo; Pharrell Williams	The Neptunes	3:31
5.	"I Love You"	Evans; Anthony Best; Isaac Hayes; Jamison; Jennifer Lopez; Bobby Springsteen	Buckwild; Diddy; Winans	4:27
6.	"Everything" (Interlude)	Jamison; Winans	Diddy; Winans	0:49
7.	"Back to Love"	Evans; Mike Cleveland; Combs; Jamison; Winans	Diddy; Winans; Evans^{[B]}	3:40
8.	"Faithful" (Interlude)	Evans; Cheri Dennis; Chucky Thompson	Thompson; Todd Russaw^{[B]}	2:00
9.	"Do Your Time"	Evans; Combs; Hubert Laws; Harold Lilly; Winans	Diddy; Winans	4:20
10.	"Don't Cry"	Evans; Robert Barnett; Andre Benjamin; Patrick Brown; Combs; Jones; Knight; Willie Knighton; Ray Murray; Antwan Patton; Adonis Shropshire; Rico Wade; Williams; Winans	Diddy; Winans	3:37
11.	"Faithfully"	Evans; Kevin Gilliam; Jamison; James Mtume; Williams	Battlecat; Evans^{[B]}	3:57
12.	"Brand New Man"	Evans; Kip Collins; Combs; Jamison; Jones; Winans	Collins; Diddy; Winans	4:12
13.	"Ghetto" (Interlude)	Evans; Saulsberry	Saulsberry; Evans	1:21
14.	"Where We Stand"	Evans; Hozay Clowney; Michael Franks; Rasheem Pugh	Clowney; Evans	4:22
15.	"Heaven Only Knows"	Evans; Combs; Jonathan Davis; Kamaal Fareed; Albert Johnson; Lilly; René Moore; Kejuan Muchita; Terance Perry; Mayfield Small; Winans	Havoc; Diddy; Winans	4:15
16.	"Love Can't Hide"	Evans; Michael Bussacco; Vada Nobles; Pugh	Clowney; Evans^{[B]}	5:04
17.	"Can't Believe" (featuring Carl Thomas)	Evans; Jermaine Baxter; Combs; Anthony Cruz; Jamison; Jones; Nasir Jones; Knight; Chris Taylor; Winans; Andre Young	Diddy; Winans	5:00
18.	"Love Song" (Interlude)	Evans; Thompson	Thompson; Evans^{[B]}	1:49

Notes

- ^{^A} signifies a vocal producer
- ^{^B} signifies a co-producer

Samples

- "Alone in This World" contains a sample from "Who Shot Ya?" by Notorious B.I.G.
- "I Love You" contains a sample from "Make a Little Love to Me" by Isaac Hayes.
- "Back to Love" contains a sample from "Last Night a D.J. Saved My Life" by Indeep.
- "Faithful (Interlude)" contains a sample from "Faithful to the End" by D.J. Rogers.
- "Do Your Time" contains a sample from "I Had A Dream" by Hubert Laws.
- "Can't Believe" contains a sample from "Phone Tap" by The Firm.
- "Don't Cry" contains a sample from "Mainstream" by Outkast.
- "Faithfully" contains a sample from "Juicy Fruit" by Mtume.
- "Where We Stand" contains a sample from "Never Say Die" by Michael Franks.
- "Heaven Only Knows" contains a sample from "That's Alright With Me" by Esther Phillips.

== Charts ==
=== Weekly charts ===
Weekly chart performance for Faithfully
Chart (2001)	Peak position
UK Albums (OCC)	193
UK R&B Albums (Official Charts)	23
US Billboard 200	14
US Top R&B/Hip-Hop Albums (Billboard)	2

=== Year-end charts ===
2001 year-end chart performance for Faithfully
Chart (2001)	Position
Canadian R&B Albums (Nielsen SoundScan)	156

2002 year-end chart performance for Faithfully
Chart (2002)	Position
Canadian R&B Albums (Nielsen SoundScan)	200
US Billboard 200	115
US Top R&B/Hip-Hop Albums (Billboard)	20

== Certifications ==
Certifications for Faithfully
Region	Certification	Certified units/sales
United States (RIAA)	Gold	500,000^{^}
^{^} Shipments figures based on certification alone.

== Release history ==
Release history and formats for Faithfully
Region	Date	Formats	Label	Ref.
United States	November 6, 2001	CD; digital download	Bad Boy; Arista	
