= Ken Carter =

American basketball coach (born 1959)

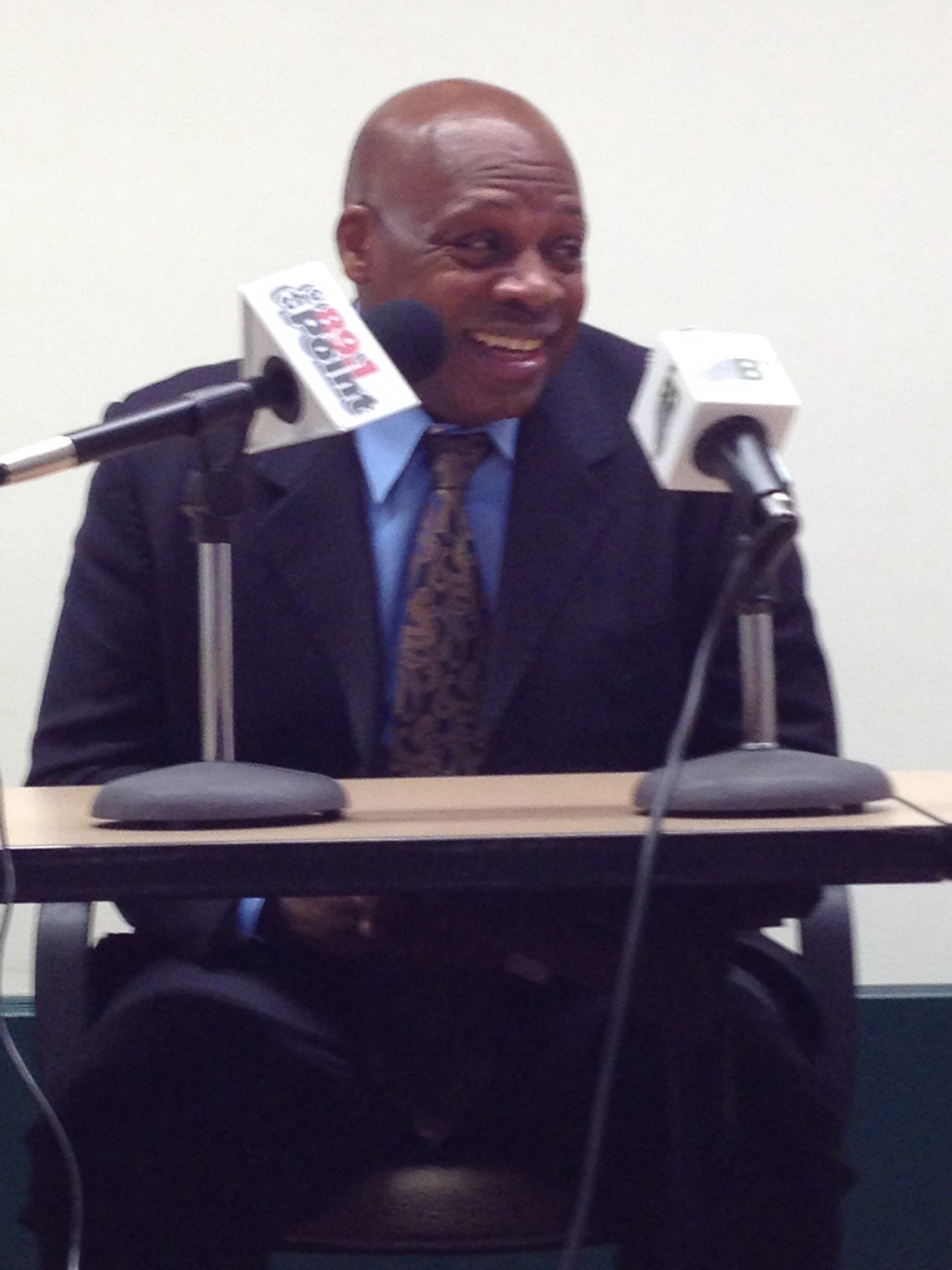
- Carter giving an interview in 2014
- Other name: Coach Carter

Ken Carter is an American basketball coach who made national headlines in 1999 when he locked out his Richmond High School basketball team because of poor academic performance. The event was then adapted into the 2005 sports drama Coach Carter.

== Biography ==
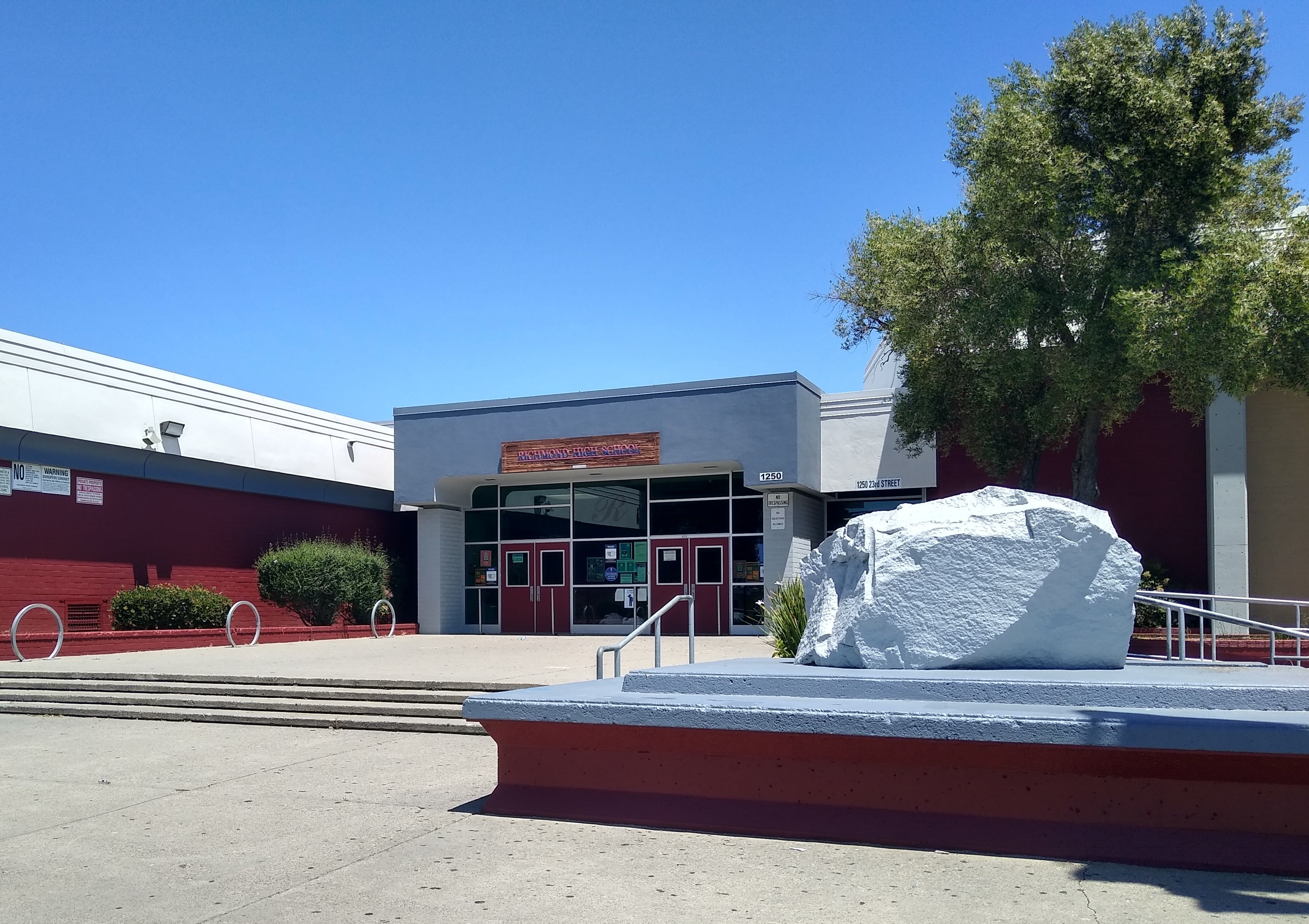
Richmond High School

In early January 1999, as the high school basketball coach of Richmond High School, Ken Carter benched his entire team, cancelled their practice for the week, and cancelled two upcoming games due to their poor academic performance. At the start of the season, he had gotten the players to sign a contract which required among other things that they sit at the front of all of their classes, maintain a minimum 2.3 GPA, and dedicate at least 10 hours a week to their studies. Out of the 45 players on the team, 15 had been failing to meet the terms of the contract, which prompted Carter to bench the entire team until their academic performance improved.

He faced criticism for the move, especially given the fact that the team was undefeated, having a record of 13-0. Carter maintained that ensuring the players remained focused on their academics was top priority, stating "How many of these young men are really going to make their living playing basketball?". After eight sessions of study hall that replaced team practice, Carter, the school's principal, and the athletic director decided that the players' academic performance had improved sufficiently to allow practice to resume and for the cancelled games to be reinstated. Two years later, all of the 15 players who had failed to meet the academic requirements during the controversy had started attending higher education.

The story of the 1999 season was the basis for the 2005 film Coach Carter, with Carter played by Samuel L. Jackson.

== See also ==
- Coach Carter
- Inspirational/motivational instructors/mentors portrayed in films
