= Unlimited Touch =

New York-based post-disco group

- Origin: New York, United States
- Genres: Post-disco
- Years active: 1980–1981, 1983–1984
- Label: Prelude
- Past members: Audrey Wheeler; Philip Hamilton; Tony Cintron; Sandy Anderson (deceased); Stephanie James; Lenny Underwood

Unlimited Touch was an American, New York–based disco and post-disco group, most active in the early 1980s. The group's most famous song in its short lifespan was "I Hear Music in the Streets", which made number 6 on US Dance chart in 1981.

== Overview ==
The group consisted of Audrey Wheeler (lead singer), Philip Hamilton, Tony Cintron, Sandy Anderson, Stephanie James and Lenny Underwood. Raymond Reid and William Anderson from New York–based band Crown Heights Affair instigated Unlimited Touch in the early 1980s, but they were not part of the band. The group was signed to Prelude Records (via Epic Records in the UK) and released their self-titled debut album in 1981. Charles Richards was the executive producer of the group. Lenny Underwood co-wrote "I Hear Music in the Streets" and "Searchin' to Find the One", which were minor hits in the US Billboard R&B chart.

Due to a label and group dispute, they disbanded by the end of 1981, but re-formed in 1983 with a new line-up of just three of the original members: Wheeler, Anderson, and James. They released a second album Yes We're Ready in 1983. Their final single "Reach Out (Everlasting Lover)" reached number 54 on the US Dance chart in 1984, but the group disbanded again not long after this. In 1993, Unidisc Music issued the Searching to Find the One compilation album.

In 1997, "I Hear Music in the Streets" was sampled by Rampage, along with Billie Lawrence on their song "Take It to the Streets". The song has also been sampled by producer Sean Combs who sampled the bass guitar and drum breakdown for the Faith Evans song "All Night Long" in 1999.

On March 31, 2020, bassist Sandy Anderson died from the COVID-19 virus.

== Discography ==
=== Studio albums ===
- Unlimited Touch (1981)
- Yes, We're Ready (1983)

=== Compilation albums ===
- Searching to Find the One (1993)

=== Singles ===
Year	Title	Peak chart positions		
Year	Title	US Dance	US R&B	UK
1980	"I Hear Music in the Streets"	6	33	―
1981	"Searching to Find the One"	—	29	76
1981	"Love to Share"	—	—	—
1983	"No One Can Love Me (Quite the Way You Do)"	—	—	—
1983	"Happily Ever After"	—	—	—
1983	"Yes, I'm Ready"	—	—	—
1984	"Reach Out (Everlasting Lover)"	54	—	—
"—" denotes releases that did not chart or were not released in that territory.

== See also ==
- List of post-disco artists and songs
