= I Love You (Faith Evans song) =

2002 single by Faith Evans

Single by Faith Evans

from the album Faithfully
- B-side: "You Gets No Love"
- Released: January 7, 2002
- Length: 4:27
- Label: Bad Boy Entertainment
- Songwriters: Faith Evans; Anthony Best; Michael Jamison; Jennifer Lopez; Bobby Springsteen; Isaac Hayes
- Producers: Buckwild; Sean "P. Diddy" Combs; Mario "Yellow Man" Winans

Faith Evans singles chronology
"You Gets No Love" (2001)	"I Love You" (2002)	"Burnin' Up" (2002)

"I Love You" is a song by American recording artist Faith Evans. It was written by Evans, Anthony Best, Michael Jamison, Jennifer Lopez, Bobby Springsteen, and Isaac Hayes for Evans' third studio album, Faithfully (2001). Production on the song was overseen by Buckwild, Sean "P. Diddy" Combs, and Mario "Yellow Man" Winans. Initially written for Lopez's second studio album, J.Lo (2001), the ballad samples singer Isaac Hayes' 1976 record "Make a Little Love to Me" and finds Evans, as the protagonist, confessing her love and dignity to a man who has yet to find a heart for her.

"I Love You" was released as the second single from the album on January 7, 2002, in the United States. It peaked at number 14 on the US Billboard Hot 100 and at number two on the US Hot R&B/Hip-Hop Singles & Tracks chart, marking Evans' highest-charting single since "All Night Long" (1999) as well as Faithfully's highest single peak. An accompanying music video for "I Love You" was directed by Matthew Rolston and Evans and her lover in a lavishly decorated Japanese Buddhist house during wintertime.

== Background ==
"I Love You" was written by Anthony Best, Bobby Springsteen, Jennifer Lopez, and Michael Jamison and produced by Buckwild, Mario Winans and Sean "P. Diddy" Combs. The ballad contains a sample from the song "Make a Little Love to Me" (1976) by American singer Isaac Hayes. Due to the inclusion of the sample, Isaac is also credited as songwriters. Born out of the former relationship between Combs and Lopez, the latter of which holds partial songwriter credits, was originally set to record the song for her second studio J.Lo (2001). Evans confirmed, that "it almost slipped through the cracks and ended up on her album."

== Chart performance ==
The song entered the U.S. Billboard Hot 100 songs chart, and the U.S. Radio Songs chart the same week, both spending twenty-one weeks. On the week of April 6, 2002, it peaked at number fourteen on the Billboard Hot 100 (becoming her fourth top twenty single on the chart) while it reached thirteen on the Radio Songs chart. The song also appeared on the U.S. R&B/Hip-Hop Songs chart, remaining on the chart for thirty weeks and peaking at number two on March 16, 2002, becoming her highest-charting single on the chart since her 1999 song "Never Gonna Let You Go".

== Music video ==
The music video for the song was directed by Matthew Rolston and was released on February 4, 2002. The clip starts with an outside view of a lavishly decorated house during wintertime. When the first chorus begins, Evans is seen singing while laying on a bed. During the second chorus and throughout the rest of the video, it intercuts scenes of her on the bed and her standing outside wearing a furcoat.

== Track listing ==
12-inch single

A1. "I Love You" (radio mix) — 4:21
A2. "I Love You" (instrumental) — 4:24
A3. "You Gets No Love" (instrumental) — 4:48
B1. "You Gets No Love" (extended club mix) — 4:33
B2. "You Gets No Love" (extended rap mix) — 4:48
B3. "You Gets No Love" (extended radio mix) — 4:33

European maxi-CD single

1. "I Love You" (radio edit) — 4:02
2. "I Love You" (album version) — 4:24
3. "You Gets No Love" (remix featuring G. Dep) — 4:01
4. "I Love You" (music video) — 4:00

== Personnel ==
Personnel are adapted from the liner notes of Faithfully.

- Buckwild – production, writing
- P. Diddy – production, recording
- Faith Evans – vocals
- Isaac Hayes – writing
- Hijack – keyboards
- Michael Jamison – writing
- Brian Kraz – engineering assistance
- Paul Logus – mixing
- Jennifer Lopez – writing
- Bobby Springsteen – writing

== Charts ==
=== Weekly charts ===
Weekly chart performance for "I Love You"
Chart (2002)	Peak position
US Billboard Hot 100	14
US Hot R&B/Hip-Hop Songs (Billboard)	2
US Rhythmic Airplay (Billboard)	13

=== Year-end charts ===
Year-end chart performance for "I Love You"
Chart (2002)	Position
US Billboard Hot 100	60
US Hot R&B/Hip-Hop Singles & Tracks (Billboard)	11
US Rhythmic Top 40 (Billboard)	77

== Release history ==
Release dates and formats for "I Love You"
Region	Date	Format	Label	Ref.
United States	January 7, 2002	Urban adult contemporary radio	Bad Boy Entertainment	
United States	January 28, 2002	Rhythmic contemporary radio	Bad Boy Entertainment	
United States	February 19, 2002	12-inch vinyl	Bad Boy Entertainment	
