= Alone in This World =

Single by Faith Evans

from the album Faithfully
- Released: April 6, 2002
- Length: 3:53
- Label: Bad Boy; Arista
- Songwriters: Sean Combs; Faith Evans; Mechalie Jamison; Michael Carlos Jones; Jack Knight; Herbert Magidson; Nashiem Myrick; Christopher Wallace; Mario Winans; Allie Wrubel
- Producers: P. Diddy; Winans

Faith Evans singles chronology
"Burnin' Up" (2002)	"Alone in This World" (2002)	"Relax Your Mind" (2002)

"Alone in This World" is a song by American singer Faith Evans. It was written by Sean "P. Diddy" Combs, Mechalie Jamison, Michael Carlos Jones, Jack Knight, Herbert Magidson, Mario Winans, and Allie Wrubel for her third studio album Faithfully (2001). Production was helmed by Combs and Winans. The son contains a sample from "Who Shot Ya?" (1995) by American rapper The Notorious B.I.G. Diddy. Due to the inclusion of the sample, several other writers are credited as songwriters. The song was released as the album's fourth and final single in April 2002 and reached number 73 on the US Billboard Hot R&B/Hip-Hop Songs chart. Rapper Jay-Z appeared on a remix version of the song.

== Critical reception ==
BBC Music's Keysha Davis found that "this moody track provides the perfect accompaniment to Faith's raspy, vocals, as she echoes the bewilderment of a lover gone astray, leaving her to fend for herself in this world." NME wrote that "opener "Alone in This World" is a tight Eve-esque number," Tracey E. Hopkins from Rolling Stone called the song "dance-floor ready."

== Credits and personnel ==
Credits adapted from the liner notes of Faithfully.

- Sean "P. Diddy" Combs – mixing producer, writer
- Faith Evans – writer, vocals
- Mechalie Jamison – writer
- Michael Carlos Jones – writer
- Scott Kieklak – engineering assistant
- Jack Knight – writer
- Paul Logus – mixing
- Herbert Magidson – writer
- Nashiem Myrick – writer
- Jon Nettlesbey – engineering assistant
- Adonis Shropshire – backing vocals
- Christopher Wallace – writer
- Mario Winans – producer, writer
- Allie Wrubel – writer

== Charts ==
Chart (2002)	Peak position
US Hot R&B/Hip-Hop Songs (Billboard)	73
