= Tru Love (song) =

Single by Faith Evans

from the album The First Lady
- Released: October 25, 2005
- Length: 3:41
- Label: Capitol
- Songwriter(s): Johnta Austin; Bryan Michael Cox; Jermaine Dupri; Faith Evans
- Producer(s): Dupri; Cox

Faith Evans singles chronology
"Mesmerized" (2005)	"Tru Love" (2005)	"Got 2 Be Down" (2007)

"Tru Love" is a song by American recording artist Faith Evans. It was written by Evans along with Johnta Austin, Bryan Michael Cox, and Jermaine Dupri for her fourth studio album The First Lady (2005), while its production was handled by the latter two. The contemporary R&B ballad was released as the album's third and final single in October 2005 and reached number 27 on the US Billboard Hot R&B/Hip-Hop Songs chart.

== Background ==
"Tru Love" was penned by Evans along with singer Johnta Austin and producers Bryan Michael Cox, and Jermaine Dupri. Phil Tan and Dupri mixed the track, while Brad Todd handled the recording of "Tru Love". Built along a harp, the song is a contemporary R&B ballad reminiscent of other Cox/Dupri collaborations at that time, including Usher’s "Burn," which was released a year prior.

== Critical reception ==
The song garnered a generally mixed to positive reception from music critics. MusicOMH's Sam Shepherd stated that "Tru Love" was "an understated love song, and it allows Evans to show off an impeccable timing in her delivery." He however felt that "sadly there is little weight or edge to the song and it fails to impress." Michael Benning from Blogcritics ranked "Tru Love" among those tracks which showed "off [Evan's] ability to drive slower numbers with sultry relaxed vocals." On the other hand, Raymond Fiore from Entertainment Weekly found that the album was "blemished by a few toothless slow jams" such as "Tru Love" and album cut "Ever Wonder."

== Track listings ==
Promo 12" single

1. "Tru Love" (album version) – 3:41
2. "Tru Love" (instrumental) – 3:41
3. "Tru Love" (a cappella) – 3:41
4. "Mesmerized" (Desert Storm remix radio edit, featuring Snoop Dogg) – 3:56
5. "Mesmerized" (Desert Storm remix instrumental) – 3:56
6. "Mesmerized" (Desert Storm remix a cappella, featuring Snoop Dogg) – 3:56

Promo CD single

1. "Tru Love" (radio version) – 3:41
2. "Tru Love" (instrumental) – 3:41
3. "Tru Love" (a cappella) – 3:41

== Credits and personnel ==
- Faith Evans – vocals
- Jermaine Durpi – production, mixing
- Todd Russaw – executive producer
- Andrew Shack – executive producer
- Phil Tan – mixing
- Brad Todd – recording

== Charts ==
=== Weekly charts ===
Weekly chart performance for "Tru Love"
Chart (2006)	Peak position
US Adult R&B Songs (Billboard)	10
US Bubbling Under Hot 100 Singles (Billboard)	5
US Hot R&B/Hip-Hop Songs (Billboard)	27

=== Year-end charts ===
Year-end chart performance for "Tru Love"
Chart (2006)	Position
US Hot R&B/Hip-Hop Songs (Billboard)	77
