= You Gets No Love =

2001 single by Faith Evans

Single by Faith Evans featuring P. Diddy and Loon

from the album Faithfully
- Released: September 11, 2001
- Length: 4:01
- Label: Bad Boy Entertainment
- Songwriters: Faith Evans; Michaelangelo Saulsberry; Mechalie Jamison; Kameelah Williams; Toni Coleman; Andre Wilson
- Producer: Michaelangelo Saulsberry

Faith Evans singles chronology
"Can't Believe" (2001)	"You Gets No Love" (2001)	"I Love You" (2002)

"You Gets No Love" is a song by American singer Faith Evans. It was written by Evans along with Michaelangelo Saulsberry, Mechalie Jamison, Kameelah Williams, Toni Coleman, and Andre Wilson for her third studio album, Faithfully (2001), while production was helmed by Saulsberry, with Evans co-producing. The song was released as the album's lead single in September 2001 and peaked at number 38 on the US Billboard Hot 100 as well as number eight on the Billboard Hot R&B/Hip-Hop Singles & Tracks chart.

== Background ==
"You Gets No Love" was written by Evans along with Michaelangelo Saulsberry, Mechalie Jamison, Kameelah Williams, Toni Coleman, and Andre Wilson. At the same time, production was helmed by Saulsberry, with Evans co-producing. Evans considered "You Gets No Love" an unusual single choice to lead her new album based on her previous singles, telling MTV News: "The first single is unexpected, because I think I've been portrayed as a soft-spoken, turn-the-other-cheek [type]. But I'm human, I go through drama, I break."

There are several versions of "You Gets No Love"; a radio mix with no rap is used for the music video and another radio mix features a rap from Evans. The album version features P. Diddy and Loon, while a remix features G-Dep.

== Critical reception ==
BBC Music's Keysha Davis called "You Gets No Love" a "brash, bassy track" that has "Evans vocally knocking out." She found that the song marked a departure for "a woman who had previously only sung, subtle, love monologues in her trademark jazzy, ethereal style." Caroline Sullivan from The Guardian remarked that the song was one of the tougher songs on parent album Faithfully, writing that it has "Faith sneering, 'I'll tell you why you gets no love/ Because you ain't cool enough', over the lewdest horn and bass line." The Independent found that while Evans's voice "dominates proceedings," it was "buried beneath the patina of 'old skool' vinyl scratches on the groove of "You Gets No Love"."

== Music video ==
An accompanying music video for "You Gets No Love" was directed by American filmmaker Chris Robinson and filmed in the Crenshaw area of South Central, Los Angeles. When asked about the clip, Evans described the visuals as "bright, colorful and fun" and recalled that "it was a lot of low riders and we're in the arcade playing the pinball game. I kind of catch my boyfriend in a funny situation [...] It's a refreshing take on Faith Evans."

== Track listings ==
US maxi-single
No.	Title	Length
1.	"You Gets No Love" (remix featuring G. Dep)	4:01
2.	"You Gets No Love" (radio mix featuring P. Diddy & Loon)	4:01
3.	"You Gets No Love" (remix instrumental)	4:58
4.	"You Gets No Love" (radio mix instrumental)	4:01
5.	"You Gets No Love" (extended club mix)	4:48

Europe CD single
No.	Title	Length
1.	"You Gets No Love" (radio mix featuring P. Diddy & Loon)	4:01
2.	"You Gets No Love" (radio mix with Faith's rap)	3:44
3.	"You Gets No Love" (radio mix (no rap))	3:44
4.	"You Gets No Love" (remix featuring G. Dep)	4:01
5.	"You Gets No Love" (video)	3:40

== Personnel ==
Pesonnel are adapted from the liner notes of Faithfully.

- T. Michael Coleman – writing
- P. Diddy – vocals
- Faith Evans – co-production, vocals, writing
- Mechalie Jamison – writing
- Brian Kraz – engineering assistance
- Paul Logus – mixing
- Loon – vocals
- Dominick Mancuso – engineering assistance
- Michaelangelo Saulsberry – backing vocals, production, writing
- Kameelah Williams – backing vocals, writing
- Markus Ulibarri – recording
- Andre Wilson – backing vocals, writing

== Charts ==
=== Weekly charts ===
Chart (2001)	Peak position
Australia (ARIA)	69
UK Singles (OCC)	124
UK Hip Hop/R&B (OCC)	28
US Billboard Hot 100	38
US Hot R&B/Hip-Hop Songs (Billboard)	8
US Rhythmic Airplay (Billboard)	35

=== Year-end charts ===
Chart (2001)	Position
UK Urban (Music Week)	6
US Hot R&B/Hip-Hop Singles & Tracks (Billboard)	88

Chart (2002)	Position
US Hot R&B/Hip-Hop Singles & Tracks (Billboard)	80

== Release history ==
Region	Date	Format(s)	Label(s)	Ref.
United States	September 11, 2001	Urban radio	Bad Boy Entertainment	
Australia	May 13, 2002	CD	Bad Boy Entertainment; Arista; BMG	
