= Love Like This (Faith Evans song) =

1998 single by Faith Evans

Single by Faith Evans

from the album Keep the Faith
- Released: September 21, 1998
- Genre: R&B
- Length: 4:01
- Label: Bad Boy Entertainment; Arista
- Songwriters: Faith Evans; Ron "Amen-Ra" Lawrence; Sean Combs; Schon Crawford; Clarence Emery; Bernard Edwards; Nile Rodgers
- Producers: Faith Evans; Ron "Amen-Ra" Lawrence; Sean "Puffy" Combs

Faith Evans singles chronology
"How's It Goin' Down" (1998)	"Love Like This" (1998)	"Heartbreak Hotel" (1998)

"Love Like This" is a song by American singer Faith Evans. It was written by Evans, Ron "Amen-Ra" Lawrence, Sean "Puffy" Combs, Clarence Emery, and Schon Crawford for her second studio album Keep the Faith (1998), with production helmed by Lawrence and Combs. The song is built around a looped sample from "Chic Cheer" (1978) by American band Chic. Due to the inclusion of the sample, band members Bernard Edwards and Nile Rodgers are also credited as songwriters. "Love Like This" was released as the album's lead single.

Commercially, "Love Like This" charted within the top 40 in Canada, France, New Zealand, and the United Kingdom and peaked at number seven on the US Billboard Hot 100, marking it Evans' highest-charting solo single in the United States. On the component Hot R&B Singles chart, the song reached number two; it was eventually certified gold by the Recording Industry Association of America (RIAA). Also a critical success, it was later heavily sampled on American rapper Fatman Scoop's "Be Faithful".

== Critical reception ==
Chuck Taylor from Billboard called "Love Like This" a "surprisingly bouncy, retro-vibed jam that borrows a tasty riff or two from Chic's "Chic Cheer". A nice change of pace for this revered soul balladeer, "Love Like This" also crackles with some smooth guitar work and a vocal that purrs with moist sensuality. Evans sounds like she's having an absolute blast here, and her positive energy is downright contagious. Ronnie Herel for Record Mirror Dance Update gave it four out of five, adding, "This is phat and phunky as phuk. [...] Faith smashes a mature vocal over what can only be described as a dope groove. The chorus has hook written all over it and as soon as Bad Boy decides on when to release it, it has an obvious, in-your-face bullet on its hands. You need this!" AllMusic editor Jose F. Promis declared "Love Like This" an "irresistible dance/R&B cut." In his review of parent album Keep the Faith, Ernest Hardy from Rolling Stone wrote that of "the three midtempo tracks, the best is the first single, "Love Like This"." In 2018, Billboard ranked the album 43rd on its retrospective The 98 Greatest Songs of 1998: Critics' Picks listing, writing: "As soon as you hear the mesmerizing opening beats, you can't help but rock to what's since become a party, club, and skating-rink mainstay."

== Music video ==
The song's music video, directed by Hype Williams, depicts people at a colorful skating rink with Evans' singing on a platform in the center. It features actress Countess Vaughn and former child actor Marcus T. Paulk, both from the UPN sitcom Moesha, in cameos. The music video was filmed shortly after the birth of Evans's third child Joshua, so her stylists were forced to use duct tape to make sure she could fit into the outfits for the shoot.

== Track listings ==
Maxi single
No.	Title	Writer(s)	Producer(s)	Length
1.	"Love Like This"	Faith Evans; Ron "Amen-Ra" Lawrence; Sean Combs; Schon Crawford; Clarence Emery; Bernard Edwards; Nile Rodgers	Evans; Lawrence; Combs	4:01
2.	"You Used to Love Me" (album version)	Evans	Combs; Chucky Thompson	4:28
3.	"Soon as I Get Home" (album version)	Evans; Combs; Thompson	Combs; Thompson	5:24

== Personnel ==
Personnel are adapted from the liner notes of Keep the Faith.

- Prince Charles Alexander – recording
- Sean Combs – production, writing
- Schon Crawford – writing
- Bernard Edwards – writing (sample)
- Clarence Emery – writing
- Faith Evans – vocals, writing
- Ron "Amen-Ra" Lawrence – production, writing
- Axel Niehaus – mixing
- Nile Rodgers – writing (sample)

== Charts ==
=== Weekly charts ===
Weekly chart performance for "Love Like This"
Chart (1998–1999)	Peak position
Australia (ARIA)	58
Canada (Nielsen SoundScan)	8
Europe (Eurochart Hot 100)	99
France (SNEP)	29
Netherlands (Dutch Top 40 Tipparade)	13
Netherlands (Single Top 100)	79
New Zealand (Recorded Music NZ)	33
Scottish Singles Sales (Official Charts)	57
UK Singles (Official Charts)	24
UK Hip Hop/R&B (Official Charts)	8
UK Urban (Music Week)	1
US Billboard Hot 100	7
US Hot R&B/Hip-Hop Songs (Billboard)	2
US Rhythmic Airplay (Billboard)	15

=== Year-end charts ===
Year-end chart performance for "Love Like This"
Chart (1999)	Position
UK Urban (Music Week)	1
US Billboard Hot 100	58
US Hot R&B/Hip-Hop Singles & Tracks (Billboard)	20
US Rhythmic Top 40 (Billboard)	60

== Certifications ==
Certifications for "Love Like This"
Region	Certification	Certified units/sales
New Zealand (RMNZ)	Platinum	30,000^{‡}
United Kingdom (BPI)	Silver	200,000^{‡}
United States (RIAA)	Gold	500,000^{^}
^{^} Shipments figures based on certification alone.^{‡} Sales+streaming figures based on certification alone.

== Release history ==
Release dates and formats for "Love Like This"
Region	Date	Format(s)	Label(s)	Ref.
United States	September 21, 1998	Urban radio	Bad Boy Entertainment; Arista	
United Kingdom	November 2, 1998	12-inch vinyl; CD; cassette	Puff Daddy; Arista; BMG	
