= Coach Carter =

2005 American film directed by Thomas Carter

- Theatrical release poster
- Directed by: Thomas Carter
- Written by: Mark Schwahn; John Gatins
- Produced by: David Gale; Brian Robbins; Michael Tollin
- Starring: Samuel L. Jackson; Rob Brown; Ashanti
- Cinematography: Sharone Meir
- Edited by: Peter Berger
- Music by: Trevor Rabin
- Production companies: MTV Films; Tollin/Robbins Productions
- Distributed by: Paramount Pictures
- Release date: January 14, 2005
- Running time: 136 minutes
- Country: United States
- Language: English
- Budget: $30 million
- Box office: $76.7 million

Coach Carter is a 2005 American biographical sports drama film starring Samuel L. Jackson and directed by Thomas Carter. It is based on the true story of Richmond High School basketball coach Ken Carter, who made headlines in 1999 for suspending his undefeated high school basketball team due to poor academic results. The screenplay was co-written by John Gatins and Mark Schwahn. The cast features Rob Brown, Channing Tatum (in his film debut), Debbi Morgan, Robert Ri'chard, and singer Ashanti.

The film was a co-production between MTV Films and Tollin/Robbins Productions. It was commercially distributed by Paramount Pictures for theatrical release and home video rental. The film explores professional ethics, academics, and athletics. The sports action in the film was coordinated by Mark Ellis. On January 11, the film's soundtrack was released by Capitol Records, and the film's score was composed and orchestrated by musician Trevor Rabin. Coach Carter was released in the United States on January 14, 2005, and earned $76.7 million on a $30 million budget. It received a varied reception from critics.

== Plot ==
In Richmond, California, Ken Carter becomes the coach of Richmond High School's basketball team, the Oilers, for which he once played. The team is initially undisciplined and disrespectful. Carter implements strict contracts requiring the players to sit in the front rows of their classes, maintain a 2.3 GPA, and submit to progress reports on grades and attendance. Despite parental opposition, most players sign the contracts, though some, including talented player and drug dealer Timo Cruz, walk out. Principal Garrison questions Carter's strict approach, doubting the players' ability to meet his demands.

Carter imposes a rigorous training regimen focused on conditioning and teamwork. His son, Damian, joins the team after transferring from a private school. Cruz eventually asks to rejoin, agreeing to complete a series of tough exercises. Although he falls short, his teammates help him finish, allowing him to rejoin the team.

Team captain Kenyon Stone struggles with his girlfriend Kyra's pregnancy, leading to tension between them, with Kenyon wanting to go to college and knowing a baby will stop this from happening. Another player, Junior Battle, is suspended for skipping classes. His mother, Willa, pleads with Carter, who reinstates Junior after he apologizes.

The team improves, bonding with Carter and becoming undefeated in the regular season. After winning a holiday tournament, the team sneaks out to a party, which Carter interrupts. He later discovers some players are failing academically and locks the gym, directing the team to study until they meet the contract's terms.

Cruz angrily quits the team again, but after his cousin Renny is gunned down in a drug deal gone wrong, he apologizes to Carter and begs to rejoin the team. Carter's gym lockdown draws media attention and community outrage. He argues that the boys need education to avoid a life of crime or limited prospects. At a school board hearing, Carter declares he will resign if the lockdown is lifted. Despite support from Principal Garrison and the board's chairwoman, the lockdown is ended by the majority vote.

Carter prepares to leave, but the team, inspired by his message, chooses to continue studying instead of playing. Cruz, responding to Carter's repeated query about his deepest fear, quotes from A Return to Love, thanking Carter for saving his life.

The team achieves their academic goals with success. Kenyon reconciles with Kyra, who reveals she had an abortion, and invites her to join him at college. The team plays in the state tournament, losing narrowly to St. Francis. Despite the loss, Carter is proud of their perseverance and academic achievements. The team is celebrated by the community, with several players earning college scholarships.

== Cast ==
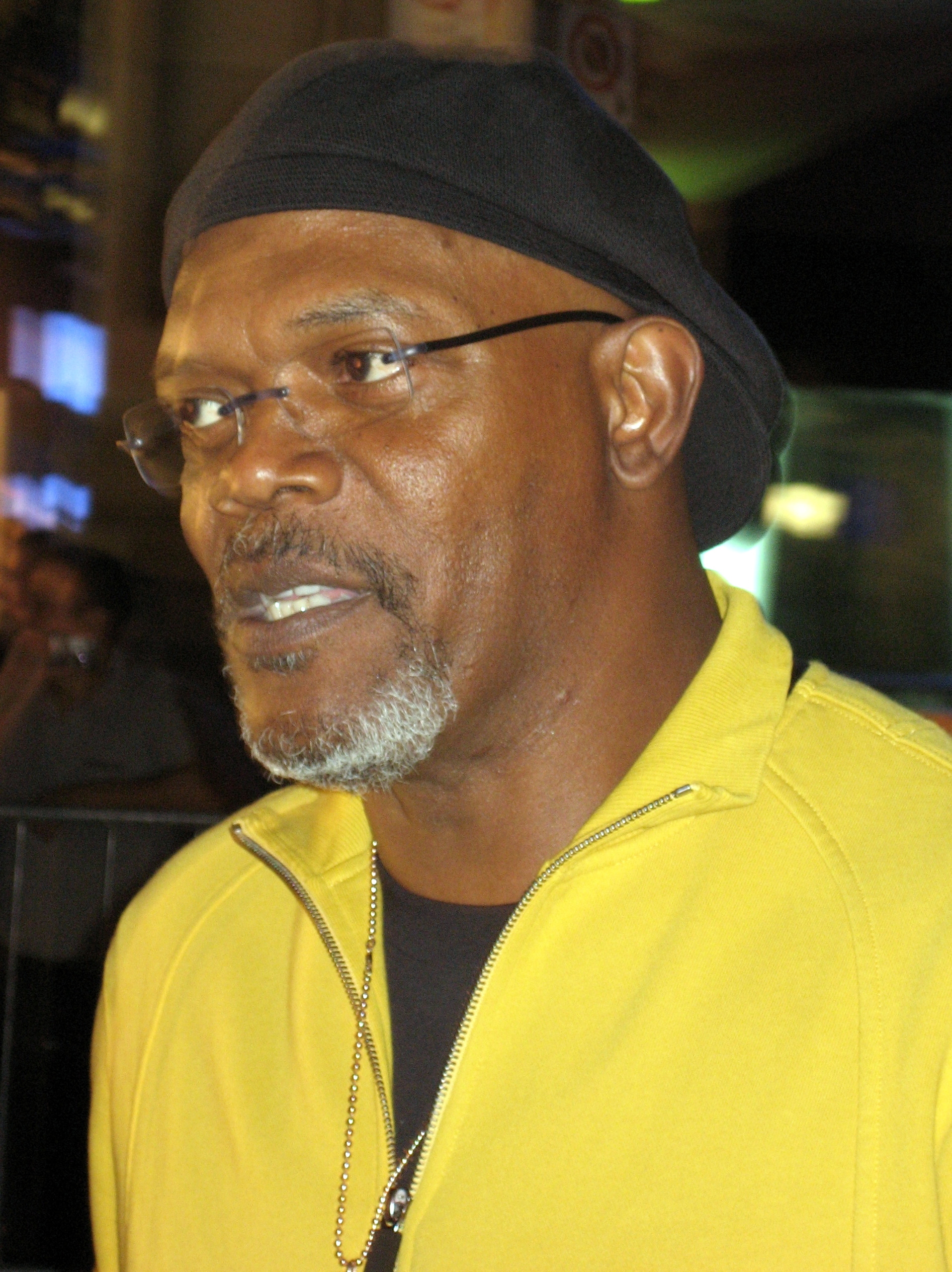
Samuel L. Jackson portrayed real-life basketball coach Ken Carter.

- Samuel L. Jackson as Coach Ken Carter
- Rob Brown as Kenyon Stone
- Robert Ri'chard as Damien Carter
- Rick Gonzalez as Timo Cruz
- Nana Gbewonyo as Junior Battle
- Antwon Tanner as Worm
- Channing Tatum as Jason Lyle
- Ashanti as Kyra
- Debbi Morgan as Tonya Carter
- Vincent Laresca as Renny
- Denise Dowse as Principal Garrison
- Mel Winkler as Coach White
- Ray Baker as St. Francis Coach
- Octavia Spencer as Mrs. Willa Battle
- Texas Battle as Maddux
- Adrienne Bailon as Dominique
- Dana Davis as Peyton
- Sonya Eddy as Worm's Mother

== Production ==
Production started in mid-2004 and ended in late 2004. Filming locations for the motion picture included Los Angeles and Long Beach, California; the locations in Long Beach included St. Anthony High School's gymnasium.

== Release ==
Coach Carter was released on January 14, 2005, in the United States. During that weekend, the film opened in first place, grossing $24.2 million from 2,524 locations, beating out Meet the Fockers ($19.3 million). The film's revenue dropped by 24% in its third week of release, earning $8 million. For that particular weekend, the film slipped to fifth place with a slightly higher theater count at 2,574. Coach Carter went on to top out domestically at $67.3 million through a 16-week theatrical run. For 2005 as a whole, the film cumulatively ranked at a box-office performance position of 36.

Following its release in theaters, the Region 1 edition of the film was released on VHS and DVD in the United States on June 21, 2005. Special features for the DVD include two commentaries: Coach Carter: The Man Behind the Movie and Fast Break at Richmond High, deleted scenes, and a music video, "Hope", by Twista featuring Faith Evans.

A restored widescreen, high-definition Blu-ray Disc version of the film was released on December 16, 2008. Special features include two commentaries: The Man Behind the Movie and Fast Break at Richmond High; six deleted scenes; "Hope" music video by Twista featuring Faith Evans; writing Coach Carter: The Two Man Game; Coach Carter: Making the Cut; and the theatrical trailer in HD. An additional viewing option for the film in the media format of video on demand has been made available, as well.

== Critical reception ==
On Rotten Tomatoes, the film has an approval rating of 64% based on 149 reviews, with an average rating of 6.1/10. The site's critical consensus reads, "Even though it's based on a true story, Coach Carter is pretty formulaic stuff, but it's effective and energetic, thanks to a strong central performance from Samuel L. Jackson." On Metacritic, which assigns a weighted average, the film has a score of 57 out of 100, based on 36 critics, indicating "mixed or average" reviews. Audiences polled by CinemaScore gave the film an average grade of "A" on a scale of A+ to F. Roger Ebert suspected a link between the film's focus on good role models and Jackson's decision to not co-star with 50 Cent, citing the "underlying values of the rapper’s life", and gave the film three out of four stars.

== Accolades ==
The film was nominated for and won several awards in 2005–06.

Award	Category	Nominee	Result
2005 BET Awards	Best Actor	Samuel L. Jackson	Nominated
2005 Black Movie Awards	Outstanding Achievement in Directing	Thomas Carter	Won
2005 Black Movie Awards	Outstanding Motion Picture	David Gale, Brian Robbins, Michael Tollin	Nominated
2005 Black Movie Awards	Outstanding Performance by an Actor in a Leading Role	Samuel L. Jackson	Nominated
Black Reel Awards of 2006	Best Director	Thomas Carter	Won
Black Reel Awards of 2006	Best Actor	Samuel L. Jackson	Nominated
Black Reel Awards of 2006	Best Breakthrough Performance	Ashanti	Nominated
Black Reel Awards of 2006	Best Film	David Gale, Brian Robbins, Michael Tollin	Nominated
ESPY Awards 2005	Best Sports Movie	————	Nominated
2005 37th NAACP Image Awards	Outstanding Actor in a Motion Picture	Samuel L. Jackson	Won
2005 37th NAACP Image Awards	Outstanding Directing in a Feature Film/Television Movie	Thomas Carter	Nominated
2005 37th NAACP Image Awards	Outstanding Motion Picture	————	Nominated
2005 37th NAACP Image Awards	Outstanding Supporting Actress in a Motion Picture	Ashanti	Nominated
2005 MTV Movie Awards	Breakthrough Female	Ashanti	Nominated
2006 32nd People's Choice Awards	Favorite Movie Drama	————	Nominated
2005 Teen Choice Awards	Choice Movie Actor: Drama	Samuel L. Jackson	Nominated
2005 Teen Choice Awards	Choice Movie Breakout Performance - Female	Ashanti	Nominated
2005 Teen Choice Awards	Choice Movie: Drama	————	Nominated

== Soundtrack ==
The soundtrack for the film was released by Capitol Records on January 11, 2005. The score for the film was orchestrated by Trevor Rabin. An extensive list of songs are featured on the soundtrack, which differs from the soundtrack recording. The recording includes five songs which were not featured in the film: "About da Game" by Trey Songz; "Balla" by Mack 10 featuring Da Hood; "Beauty Queen" by CzarNok; "What Love Can Do" by Letoya; and "Wouldn't You Like to Ride", by Kanye West, Malik Yusef, and Common.

Coach Carter: Music from the Motion Picture
No.	Title	Length
1.	"All Night Long"	3:33
2.	"No Need for Conversation"	3:38
3.	"Professional"	3:36
4.	"Southside"	4:13
5.	"Roll Wit' You"	3:23
6.	"Wouldn't You Like to Ride"	3:51
7.	"Hope"	4:12
8.	"Your Love (Is The Greatest Drug I've Ever Known)"	3:34
9.	"This One"	3:06
10.	"Beauty Queen"	3:44
11.	"Balla"	4:07
12.	"Time"	4:52
13.	"What Love Can Do"	4:04
14.	"About Da Game"	3:39
15.	"Let the Drummer Kick"
Total length:		53:23

== See also ==
- List of basketball films
- List of hood films
- 2005 in film
