= Burnin' Up (Faith Evans song) =

Single by Faith Evans

from the album Faithfully
- Released: March 15, 2002
- Genre: R&B; hip hop soul
- Length: 3:31
- Label: Bad Boy; Arista
- Songwriters: Faith Evans; Missy Elliott; Chauncey Hawkins; Chad Hugo; Pharrell Williams
- Producer: The Neptunes

Faith Evans singles chronology
"I Love You" (2002)	"Burnin' Up" (2002)	"Alone in This World" (2002)

Missy Elliott singles chronology
"The Knoc" (2002)	"Burnin' Up" (2002)	"4 My People" (2002)

Music video
- "Burnin' Up" on YouTube

"Burnin' Up" is a song by American singer Faith Evans featuring rapper Loon. It was composed by Evans, Loon, Chad Hugo and Pharrell Williams for her third studio album Faithfully (2001), with production helmed by Hugo and Williams under their production moniker The Neptunes. A dance-inducing, beat-heavy uptempo song, "Burnin' Up" falls in line with the straightforward drums, guitar strumming, and clavichord worship of the duo's early years as producers. Lyrically, it has Evans pleading with a man she feels is destined to be her soulmate to recognize that they belong together.

The song was released to positive reviews from music critics who ranked among the album's standout tracks. "Burnin' Up" was released as the third single from Faithfully in March 2002, with rapper Missy Elliott replacing Loon on the single version. Another remix version of the song, re-titled "Just Burnin'" and produced by Just Blaze, featured vocals from P. Diddy and Freeway. Elliott, Diddy and Freeway all appeared alongside Evans in the music video for "Burnin Up'" which was filmed in a club on Hollywood and Vine. It became the last single from the album to chart on the Billboard Hot 100.

== Critical reception ==
Shaheem Reid from MTV News felt that Evans was "on fire with passion on 'Burnin' Up.' Singing over the Neptunes' vintage dance-inducing string plucks and drum thumps, Faith pleads with a man she feels is destined to be her soulmate to recognize that they belong together [...] Bad Boy MC Loon uses his conversational flow to drop lines that teeter on the line between conceit and confidence. BBC Music's Keysha Davis found that "Burnin' Up" was "probably the main contender for crossover appeal. Produced by the Neptunes, the latest hit making collective with the Midas touch, this track has all the hallmarks of their previous chart toppers – continuous guitar strumming, plenty beats per minute and a ridiculously repetitive chorus. Allmusic ranked the song among their favorite tracks on Faithfully alongside "Alone in this World", “Back to Love” and “Can't Believe.”

== Track listings ==
CD single
No.	Title	Length
1.	"Burnin' Up" (Radio Mix, featuring Missy Elliott)	3:22
2.	"Burnin' Up" (Album Version, featuring Loon)	3:29
3.	"Burnin' Up" (Instrumental)	3:27

Remix single
No.	Title	Length
1.	"Just Burnin'" (Radio Mix, featuring Freeway & P. Diddy)	4:34
2.	"Burnin' Up" (Alternate Radio Mix, featuring Freeway & P. Diddy)	4:24
3.	"Burnin' Up" (Radio Mix, featuring Missy Elliott)	3:23
4.	"Just Burnin'" (Instrumental)	5:43

== Credits and personnel ==
Credits adapted from the liner notes of Faithfully.

- Chris Athens – mastering
- Andrew Coleman – recording
- Faith Evans – writer, vocals
- Serban Ghenea – Mixing
- Chad Hugo – producer, writer
- Chauncey "Loon" Hawkins – writer, vocals
- Meelah Williams – backing vocals
- Pharrell Williams – producer, writer

== Charts ==
=== Weekly charts ===
Chart (2002)	Peak position
US Billboard Hot 100	60
US Hot R&B/Hip-Hop Songs (Billboard)	19

=== Year-end charts ===
Chart (2002)	Position
US Hot R&B/Hip-Hop Songs (Billboard)	76
