= Again (Faith Evans song) =

2005 single by Faith Evans

Single by Faith Evans

from the album The First Lady
- Released: February 7, 2005
- Length: 3:21
- Label: Capitol
- Songwriters: Ivan Barias; Venus Dodson; Faith Evans; Carvin Haggins; Jerry Harris
- Producer: Carvin & Ivan

Faith Evans singles chronology
"Hope" (2004)	"Again" (2005)	"Mesmerized" (2005)

"Again" is a song by American singer Faith Evans. It was written by Ivan Barias, Carvin Haggins, and Evans for her fourth studio album The First Lady (2005), while production was helmed by Barias and Haggins under their production moniker Carvin & Ivan. It contains a sample from "Genuine" by American 1970s soul group the Whatnauts. Due to the inclusion of the sample, Jerry Harris and Venus Dodson are also credited as songwriters. "Again" addresses Evans's 2004 arrest for drug possession.

Released as the lead single from The First Lady on February 7, 2005, the song marked a top-10 return for Evans on the US Billboard Hot R&B/Hip-Hop Songs chart, peaking at number seven. "Again" also peaked at number 47 on the US Billboard Hot 100. Worldwide, the song charted within the top 50 in Australia and peaked at number 12 on the UK Singles Chart. The accompanying music video for "Again" was directed by longtime collaborator Chris Robinson and filmed in Los Angeles, California in late January 2005.

== Background and recording ==
"Again" was written by Evans with Venus Dodson, Jerry Harris, and Ivan Barias and Carvin Haggins, while the latter handled the song's entire production. The track is one out of several track on which Evans collaborated with Carvin & Ivan, both of whom advised her to record a song for the album that would address her 2004 arrest for drug possession. In an interview with Vibe, Haggins noted, that the original lyrics to "Again" were actually more risqué than the version that was eventually recorded for the album. In the first version of the song's second verse Evans name-checked radio personality Wendy Williams and cited old rumors about a romance with Tupac Shakur. Evans called "Again" a "testament to my name" and added: "This song is near and dear to my heart. I'm not perfect, and everything I’ve been through has been for a reason. My faith in God and knowing that he watches over me helps me to believe that if he brought me to it, he'll bring me through it."

== Music video ==
The accompanying music video for "Again" was directed by longtime collaborator Chris Robinson and filmed in Los Angeles, California in late January 2005. Production was overseen by Dawn Rose for Robot Films/HSI, while Jeff Selis served as the video's editor. It debuted in March 2005.

== Track listings ==
All tracks are written by Faith Evans, Carvin Haggins, Ivan Barias, Venus Dodson, and Jerry Harris except where noted.

US and UK 12-inch single
No.	Title	Length
1.	"Again" (main)
2.	"Again" (instrumental)
3.	"Again" (a cappella)

UK CD1 and European CD single
No.	Title	Writer(s)	Length
1.	"Again"
2.	"Do My Thang"	Kameron Houff

UK CD2
No.	Title	Writer(s)	Length
1.	"Again"
2.	"Get Over You"	Evans; Haggins; Barias; Johnnie Smith
3.	"Again" (instrumental)
4.	"Again" (a cappella)
5.	"Again" (video)

Australasian CD single
No.	Title	Writer(s)	Length
1.	"Again"
2.	"Get Over You"	Evans; Haggins; Barias; Smith
3.	"Again" (instrumental)

== Credits and personnel ==
Credits are adapted from the liner notes of The First Lady.

- Ivan Barias – production, writing
- Venus Dodson – writing
- Faith Evans – vocals, writing
- Carvin Haggins – production, writing
- Jerry Harris – writing
- Manny Marroquin – mixing
- Brad Todd – recording

== Charts ==
=== Weekly charts ===
Chart (2005)	Peak position
Australia (ARIA)	49
Australian Urban (ARIA)	19
Belgium (Ultratip Bubbling Under Flanders)	15
Belgium (Ultratip Bubbling Under Wallonia)	17
Netherlands (Urban Top 100)	53
Scotland Singles (OCC)	24
Switzerland (Schweizer Hitparade)	100
UK Singles (OCC)	12
UK Hip Hop/R&B (OCC)	7
US Billboard Hot 100	47
US Hot R&B/Hip-Hop Songs (Billboard)	7

=== Year-end charts ===
Chart (2005)	Position
US Hot R&B/Hip-Hop Songs (Billboard)	40

== Release history ==
Region	Date	Format(s)	Label(s)	Ref.
United States	February 7, 2005	Urban adult contemporary; urban radio	Capitol	
United Kingdom	May 2, 2005	12-inch vinyl; CD	EMI	
Australia	May 23, 2005	CD	Capitol	
