= Mesmerized (song) =

2005 single by Faith Evans

Single by Faith Evans

from the album The First Lady
- Released: June 13, 2005
- Recorded: Larrabee Sound (North Hollywood, California)
- Length: 4:10
- Label: Capitol
- Songwriters: Homer Banks; George Benson; Bettye Crutcher; Don Davis; Faith Evans; Andre Johnson; Todd Russaw; Donald Sebesky; Chucky Thompson; Kameelah Williams
- Producers: Andre "AJ" Johnson; Todd Russaw; Chucky Thompson

Faith Evans singles chronology
"Again" (2005)	"Mesmerized" (2005)	"Tru Love" (2005)

"Mesmerized" is a song by American R&B recording artist Faith Evans from her fourth studio album, The First Lady (2005). Inspired by producer Chucky Thompson's original track, which contains interpolations from Johnnie Taylor's 1968 single "Who's Making Love", written by Homer Banks, Don Davis, Bettye Crutcher, and Raymond Jackson, and George Benson's "Footin' It", crafted by Benson and Donald Sebesky, Evans wrote the song alongside Andre Johnson, Kameelah Williams, Thompson, and husband Todd Russaw; its production was handled by Johnson, Thompson and Russaw. A throwback to 1960s music, the uptempo funk song exhibits style similar to that of Lyn Collins, Aretha Franklin and James Brown, among others.

The musical composition of the song, as well as Evans' vocals and versatility, positively surprised critics, who ranked it among the album's standout tracks. Released as the album's second single on June 13, 2005, "Mesmerized" reached the top 20 in the Netherlands, and peaked at number 22 on the Flemish Ultratop 50, where it became Evans' highest-charting single as a solo artist. A prominent remix of the song, produced by English dance duo Freemasons, also reached number one on the US Hot Dance Club Songs chart and remained atop for three consecutive weeks. The song was also promoted by a Bryan Barber-directed music video which features Evans performing with her band in front of a light wall.

== Background and recording ==
"Mesmerized" was penned by Faith Evans, Andre "AJ" Johnson, Todd Russaw, Kameelah Williams, and Chucky Thompson, while production was helmed by the latter, Russaw, and Johnson. The song contains interpolations from both Johnnie Taylor's 1968 single "Who's Making Love", written by Homer Banks, Bettye Crutcher, Don Davis, and Raymond Jackson, and George Benson's "Footin’ It", crafted by Benson and Donald Sebesky. Manny Marroquin mixed the track, while Ben Briggs and Brad Todd oversaw the recording of "Mesmerized"; both tasks were executed at the Larrabee Sound Studios in North Hollywood, California. It was one of the first songs Evans recorded in her then newly built home basement studio when she lived in Atlanta, Georgia. According to Evans, it was "also the song that sorta sealed [her recording] deal with Capitol Records" in 2004.

Crafted around a track that producer Chucky Thompson sent Evans two years before she picked it out, "Mesmerized" was inspired by veteran soul musicians which came to prominence in the 1960s. Speaking on its creation, the singer stated: "I was just going through CDs, and I was like 'How could I have overlooked that?"' I totally wanted to approach it as if Aretha Franklin was singing a James Brown record, so what I did was think, 'I'm like the female James Brown.' Evans' vocal performance was also influenced by Brown's sidekick Lyn Collins. "I put in her CD, just listened to three songs probably. I just wanted to kind of get that attitude without totally redoing a Lyn Collins song or without totally taking her approach to it or her ad-libs. I kept it more on an Aretha vibe with the ad-libs, and the whole attitude, just real gutsy and raw, was inspired by Lyn Collins."

== Critical reception ==
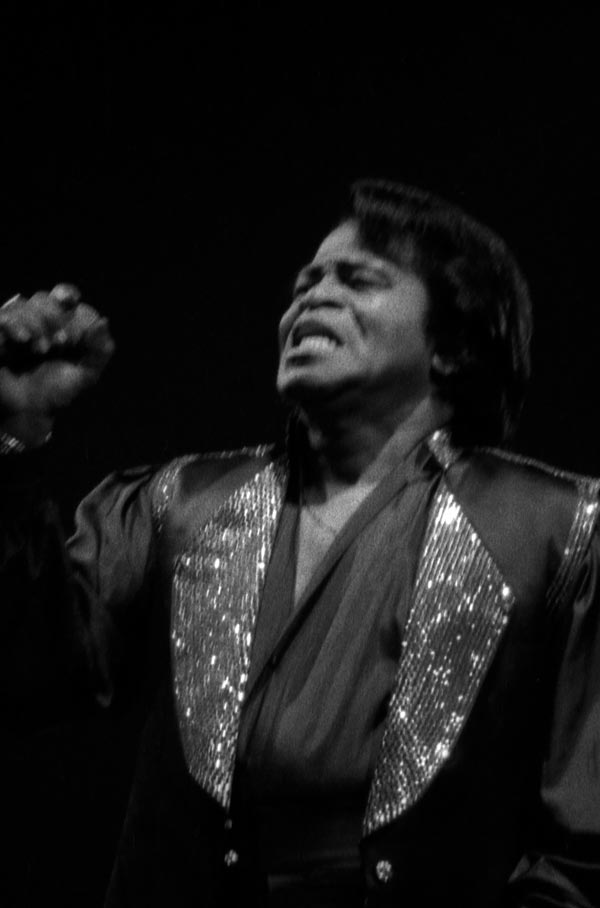
Critics applauded Evans attempted 1960s-vibe on the song, which they compared to James Brown's "sweaty productions" for sidekick Lyn Collins.

"Mesmerized" was acclaimed by music critics who appreciated the 1960s-vibe Evans attempted and they compared the song to multiple artists and compositions of that time, including "sweaty productions" from Lyn Collins and James Brown. Andria Lisle, writing for Paste magazine declared the song "a delicious, modern-day love song on par with the late Lyn Collins or hizzoner Soul Brother #1. A funky breakdown, spirited backing vocals and a righteous attitude—the sentiment on this cut is guaranteed to make her soul sisters shout." Similarly, Will Layman from PopMatters felt that the record was "a piece of real JB-esque organ funk that allows Faith to testify as lead singer and then play call-and-response with her own overdubbed gospel chorus. It is a greasy-hot performance that never goes over the top into American Idol melismatic mania or silly high note reaching."

MusicOMH's Sam Shepherd called "Mesmerized" the "best thing on the album by some distance." He felt that it "promises much, freeing Evans’ voice up and allowing her to explore the role of diva, while a sturdy James Brown groove pumps away in the background." In his album review of The First Lady, Raymond Fiore from Entertainment Weekly wrote that on "the Lyn Collins-worthy 'Mesmerized,' Evans flaunts the assured power of her sexy instrument." Generally critical with the album, People found that only "a couple of jazzy house numbers pump things up, but too few tracks—the gospel-powered "Mesmerized" being one—are truly first-rate."

== Music video ==
A music video for "Mesmerized" was shot by director Bryan Barber in June 2005. The clip features Evans performing with her band in front of a dazzling light wall in inside an ornate, yet "definitely hip space."

== Track listings ==
UK CD1
No.	Title	Writer(s)	Producer(s)	Length
1.	"Mesmerized"	Faith Evans; Stephanie Johnson; Kameelah Williams; Todd Russaw; Carl Thompson; Andre "AJ" Johnson; Homer Banks; Bettye Crutcher; Don Davis; Raymond Jackson; George Benson; Donald Sebesky	A. Johnson; Russaw; Chucky Thompson	4:10
2.	"Again" (Fooligan remix)	Evans; Carvin Haggins; Ivan Barias; Venus Dodson; Jerry Harris	Carvin & Ivan; Ian Fletcher^{[a]}; Damion Mahony^{[a]}	5:42

UK CD2
No.	Title	Writer(s)	Producer(s)	Length
1.	"Mesmerized"	Evans; Johnson; Williams; Russaw; Thompson; Johnson; Banks; Crutcher; Davis; Jackson; Benson; Sebesky	Johnson; Russaw; Thompson	4:10
2.	"Mesmerized" (Freemasons full vocal mix)	Evans; Johnson; Williams; Russaw; Thompson; Johnson; Banks; Crutcher; Davis; Jackson; Benson; Sebesky	Johnson; Russaw; Thompson; Freemasons^{[a]}	4:10
3.	"Mesmerized" (Dave Hernandez club mix)	Evans; Johnson; Williams; Russaw; Thompson; Johnson; Banks; Crutcher; Davis; Jackson; Benson; Sebesky	Johnson; Russaw; Thompson; Dave Hernandez^{[a]}	8:11
4.	"Mesmerized" (Freemasons club dub)	Evans; Johnson; Williams; Russaw; Thompson; Johnson; Banks; Crutcher; Davis; Jackson; Benson; Sebesky	Johnson; Russaw; Thompson; Freemasons^{[a]}	7:17
5.	"Mesmerized" (music video)

UK 12-inch single
No.	Title	Writer(s)	Producer(s)	Length
1.	"Mesmerized" (Freemasons vocal mix)	Evans; Johnson; Williams; Russaw; Thompson; Johnson; Banks; Crutcher; Davis; Jackson; Benson; Sebesky	Johnson; Russaw; Thompson; Freemasons^{[a]}	3:34
2.	"Mesmerized" (Freemasons club dub)	Evans; Johnson; Williams; Russaw; Thompson; Johnson; Banks; Crutcher; Davis; Jackson; Benson; Sebesky	Johnson; Russaw; Thompson; Freemasons^{[a]}	4:10
3.	"Again" (Ghostface Killah remix)	Evans; Haggins; Barias; Dodson; Harris	Carvin & Ivan	4:10

Notes

- ^{^[a]} denotes co-producer

== Credits and personnel ==
Credits adapted from the liner notes of The First Lady.

- Ben Briggs – recording
- Faith Evans – vocals
- Manny Marroquin – mixing
- Todd Russaw – executive production, management, production
- Andrew Shack – executive production
- Brad Todd – recording

== Charts ==
=== Weekly charts ===
Weekly chart performance for "Mesmerized"
Chart (2005–2006)	Peak position
Australia (ARIA)	41
Australian Urban (ARIA)	15
Belgium (Ultratop 50 Flanders)	22
Hungary (Rádiós Top 40)	34
Ireland (IRMA)	48
Netherlands (Dutch Top 40)	12
Netherlands (Single Top 100)	19
Scottish Singles Sales (Official Charts)	50
UK Singles (Official Charts)	48
UK Hip Hop/R&B (Official Charts)	12
US Dance Club Songs (Billboard) Freemasons remix	1
US Hot R&B/Hip-Hop Songs (Billboard)	56

=== Year-end charts ===
Year-end chart performance for "Mesmerized"
Chart (2005)	Position
Netherlands (Dutch Top 40)	66
US Dance Club Play (Billboard)	28

== Release history ==
Release dates and formats for "Mesmerized"
Region	Date	Format(s)	Label(s)	Ref.
United States	June 13, 2005	Urban; urban AC radio	Capitol	
Australia	October 31, 2005	CD	Capitol	

== See also ==
- List of number-one dance singles of 2005 (U.S.)
