= Can't Believe =

2001 single by Faith Evans

Single by Faith Evans featuring Carl Thomas

from the album The Saga Continues... and Faithfully
- Released: April 10, 2001
- Studio: Daddy's House (New York City)
- Length: 5:00
- Label: Bad Boy Entertainment
- Songwriters: Sean Combs; Mario Winans; Andre Young; Chris Taylor; Nasir Jones; Jermaine Baxter; Anthony Cruz
- Producers: Sean "P. Diddy" Combs; Mario "Yellow Man" Winans

Faith Evans singles chronology
"Love Is Blind" (1999)	"Can't Believe" (2001)	"You Gets No Love" (2001)

Carl Thomas singles chronology
"Emotional" (2000)	"Can't Believe" (2001)	"Never Be the Same Again" (2001)

"Can't Believe" is a song by American recording artist Faith Evans with featured vocals from fellow American R&B singer Carl Thomas. It was written and produced by P. Diddy and Mario Winans for Evans' third studio album, Faithfully (2001), and is built around a sample of "Phone Tap" as performed by the Firm and penned by Nas, Anthony Cruz, Chris Taylor, Jermaine Baxter, and Dr. Dre.

"Can't Believe" also appeared on P. Diddy's third studio album, The Saga Continues... (2001), and was released as the first single from Evans' album in April 2001. Upon its release, it reached number 54 on the US Billboard Hot 100 and number 14 on the US Billboard Hot R&B/Hip-Hop Singles & Tracks chart. An accompanying music video was filmed by director Chris Robinson in 2001.

== Personnel ==
Pesonnel are adapted from the liner notes of Faithfully.

- Executive production – Sean "Puffy" Combs
- Associate executive production – Harve "Joe Hooker" Pierre
- Instruments – Mario "Yellow Man" Winans
- Mixing – Rob Paustian
- Production – Mario "Yellow Man" Winans, Sean "P. Diddy" Combs
- Recording – Rob Paustian

== Charts ==
=== Weekly charts ===
Chart (2001)	Peak position
US Billboard Hot 100	56
US Hot R&B/Hip-Hop Songs (Billboard)	14

=== Year-end charts ===
Chart (2001)	Position
US Hot R&B/Hip-Hop Singles & Tracks (Billboard)	44
