= Never Gonna Let You Go (Faith Evans song) =

Single by Faith Evans

from the album Keep the Faith
- Released: August 17, 1999
- Length: 4:27
- Label: Bad Boy; Arista
- Songwriters: Babyface; Damon Thomas
- Producers: Babyface; Thomas

Faith Evans singles chronology
"All Night Long" (1999)	"Never Gonna Let You Go" (1999)	"Lately I" (1999)

"Never Gonna Let You Go" is a song by American singer Faith Evans. It was written and produced by Damon Thomas and Kenneth "Babyface" Edmonds for her album Keep the Faith (1998). The song spent one week at number 1 on the US Hot R&B/Hip-Hop Songs chart.

== Critical reception ==
Allmusic editor Jose F. Promis called "Never Gonna Let You Go" a "beautiful" song, "which could be classified as the last great Babyface hit song of the 1990s."

== Music video ==
A music video for "Never Gonna Let You Go" was shot outside San Francisco with director Marcus Raboy.

== Credits and personnel ==
Credits adapted from the liner notes of Keep the Faith.

- Babyface – songwriter, producer, programming, background vocals
- E'lyk – assistant mixer
- Nathan East – bass
- Faith Evans – vocals
- Jon Gass – mixer
- Kenya Ivey – background vocals
- Tavia Ivey – background vocals
- Ricky Lawson – drums (toms)
- Greg Phillinganes – piano
- Paul Boutin – recording engineer
- Damon Thomas – songwriter, producer, keyboards, drum programming
- Michael Thompson – guitar

== Charts ==
=== Weekly charts ===
Chart (1999)	Peak position
US Billboard Hot 100	17
US Hot R&B/Hip-Hop Songs (Billboard)	1

=== Year-end charts ===
Chart (1999)	Position
US Hot R&B/Hip-Hop Songs (Billboard)	25

== See also ==
- List of number-one R&B singles of 1999 (U.S.)
