= All Night Long (Faith Evans song) =

1999 single by Faith Evans

Single by Faith Evans featuring Puff Daddy

from the album Keep the Faith
- Released: March 2, 1999
- Length: 3:54
- Label: Bad Boy; Arista
- Songwriters: Faith Evans; Sean Combs; Schon Crawford; Clarence Emery; Todd Gaither; Ron "Amen-Ra" Lawrence; Bertram Reed; Todd Russaw; Galen Underwood
- Producers: Evans; Lawrence; Combs

Faith Evans singles chronology
"Georgy Porgy" (1999)	"All Night Long" (1999)	"Never Gonna Let You Go" (1999)

Puff Daddy singles chronology
"Lookin' at Me" (1998)	"All Night Long" (1999)	"Hate Me Now" (1999)

"All Night Long" is a song by American R&B singer Faith Evans featuring guest vocals by Puff Daddy. It was written by Evans, Sean "Puff Daddy" Combs, Ron "Amen-Ra" Lawrence, Schon Crawford, Clarence Emery, Todd Russaw, and Todd Gaither for her second album Keep the Faith (1998), while production was helmed by Lawrence, Combs, and Evans. The song contains a sample from "I Hear Music in the Streets" (1980) by American post-disco group Unlimited Touch. Due to the inclusion of the sample, Bertram Reed and Galen Underwood are also credited as songwriters.

The song was released by Bad Boy Records as the album's second single in March 1999. It reached number 9 on the US Billboard Hot 100 and number 3 on the Hot R&B/Hip-Hop Songs chart, becoming the second top ten single from Keep the Faith. An accompanying music video was directed by Paul Hunter.

== Critical reception ==
Chuck Taylor from Billboard found that the "trips along with beautifully layered harmonies and a sensual, commanding vocal, all about finding the vibe and taking time to make it all feel right. It's wholly inviting, really, and an effortless add for contemporary radio." Allmusic editor Jose F. Promis felt that "All Night Long" was as "equally intoxicating" as previous single "Love Like This."

== Music video ==
The music video for "All Night Long" was directed by Paul Hunter. It depicts Evans at a secret club event that is held inside a former airport terminal. Guest vocalist Puff Daddy appears alongside Evans in the video. Tariq Nasheed makes a cameo appearance as a bodyguard.

== Track listings ==
Maxi single
No.	Title	Length
1.	"All Night Long"	3:54
2.	"Life Will Pass You By"	4:49
3.	"All Night Long" (Instrumental)	3:54

== Credits and personnel ==
Credits adapted from the liner notes of Keep the Faith.

- Sean Combs – producer, writer
- Schon Crawford – arranger, writer
- Clarence Emery – writer
- Faith Evans – producer, vocals, writer
- Todd Gaither – writer
- Ron "Amen-Ra" Lawrence – producer, writer
- Tony Maserati – mixing
- Michael Patterson – additional edits
- Joe Perrera – recording
- Bertram Reid – writer (sample)
- Todd Russaw – writer
- Thom Russo – recording
- Tony Smalios – recording
- Galen Underwood – writer (sample)
- Mario Winans – overdubs

== Charts ==
=== Weekly charts ===
Weekly chart performance for "All Night Long"
Chart (1999)	Peak position
Netherlands (Dutch Top 40 Tipparade)	18
Netherlands (Single Top 100)	78
New Zealand (Recorded Music NZ)	29
Scotland Singles (Official Charts)	54
UK Singles (Official Charts)	23
UK Hip Hop/R&B (Official Charts)	7
US Billboard Hot 100	9
US Dance Club Songs (Billboard)	4
US Hot R&B/Hip-Hop Songs (Billboard)	3
US Rhythmic Airplay (Billboard) With Puff Daddy	23

=== Year-end charts ===
Year-end chart performance for "All Night Long"
Chart (1999)	Position
UK Urban (Music Week)	2
US Billboard Hot 100	74
