= Faith Evans discography =

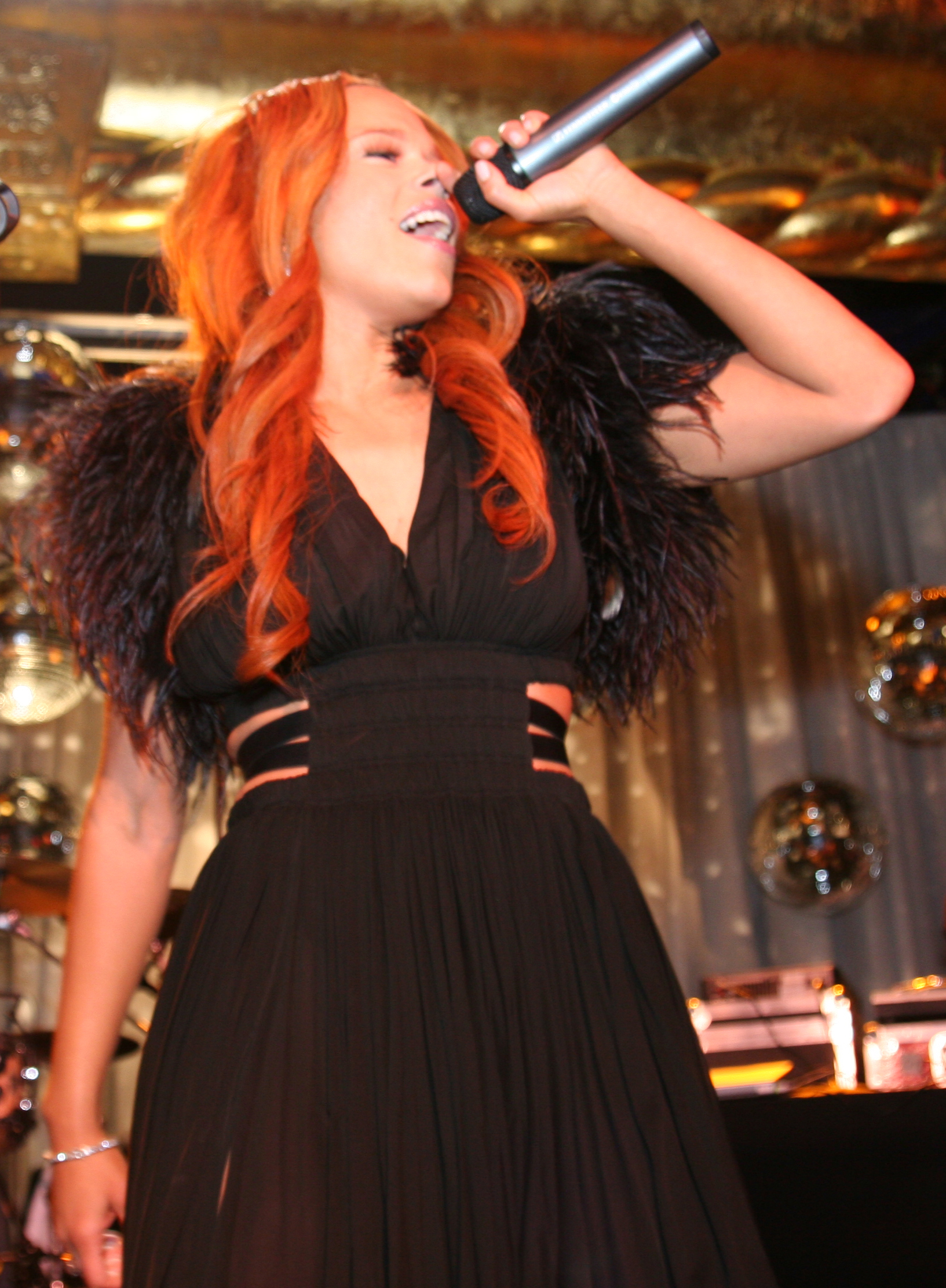
- Evans performing in 2005
- Studio albums: 8
- Soundtrack albums: 18
- Compilation albums: 1
- Singles: 34

This is a comprehensive listing of official releases by Faith Evans, an American R&B, hip hop and soul singer. As of January 2023, she has released eight studio albums, and thirty singles on Bad Boy Entertainment and Capitol Records.

Newly contracted to Bad Boy Records in 1995, Evans was consulted by executive producer Sean Combs to contribute backing vocals and writing skills to Mary J. Blige's My Life (1994) and Usher's self-titled debut album (1994) prior to starting work on her debut record album Faith. Released on August 29, 1995, in North America, the album was a collaboration with Bad Boy's main producers The Hitmen, including Chucky Thompson and Combs, but it also resulted in recordings with Poke & Tone and Herb Middleton. Faith became a success based on the singles "You Used to Love Me" and "Soon as I Get Home". The album was certified platinum with 1.5 million copies sold, according to RIAA. After The Notorious B.I.G.'s murder during March 1997, Combs helped Evans produce her tribute song named "I'll Be Missing You", based on the melody of The Police's 1983 single "Every Breath You Take". The song, which featured Combs, Evans, and all-male group 112, became a worldwide number-one success and debuted on top of the Billboard Hot 100 during 1997, scoring that for eleven weeks. The next year, Evans was featured on "Heartbreak Hotel", a collaboration with singers Whitney Houston and Kelly Price, that scored number two on the Billboard Hot 100 chart.

Two years in the making, Evans' second solo effort, Keep the Faith, was released during October 1998. Almost entirely written and produced by her, Evans considered the album difficult to complete as she had initially felt discouraged about the progress at first. Upon its release, however, the album garnered generally positive reviews by music critics, with Allmusic noting it "without a doubt a highlight of 1990s soul-pop music". Also enjoying commercial success, it eventually went platinum and produced the top ten singles "Love Like This" and "All Night Long" prompting Evans to start an 18-city theater tour with Dru Hill and Total the following year.

Evans' third album on the Bad Boy imprint, named Faithfully (2001), involved her working with a wider range of producers, including The Neptunes, Mario Winans, Buckwild, Vada Nobles, Cory Rooney, and others. Her first project with husband Todd Russaw as executive producer and creative partner, the album scored number 14 on the Billboard 200 album chart and number two on the Top R&B/Hip-Hop Albums chart, eventually being certified platinum, but yielded moderately successful singles, with the Jennifer Lopez-written "I Love You" becoming the only top twenty entry. Released amid Bad Boy Records' transition from distributor Arista Records to Universal, Evans felt Faithfully received minimum assistance by the company, and during 2004, she finally decided to end her business with Bad Boy as she was convinced Combs couldn't improve her career any more due to his other commitments.

After ending with Bad Boy Evans contracted with Capitol Records company, becoming the first contemporary R&B artist to do so, and started work on her fourth studio album The First Lady, named after her nickname on her former label. As opposed to having an in-house team of producers who supplied most of the previous material, she and Russaw were able to gain more creative control of the album and consulted producers such as Bryan-Michael Cox, Jermaine Dupri, Mike Caren, Pharrell Williams, and Chucky Thompson to contribute to it. Upon its release in April 2005, The First Lady scored at number two on the Billboard 200 and #1 of the Top R&B/Hip-Hop Albums chart, becoming Evans' best-charting album to date. It was eventually certified gold by the RIAA. At the end of the year, Evans released A Faithful Christmas, a holiday album of traditional Christmas songs and original tracks. The effort would become her last release on Capitol Records as the company was bought during 2007.

Following a longer hiatus, Evans signed a deal with E1 Entertainment in 2010. Her fifth studio album Something About Faith was released on October 5, 2010, in the United States. In the US, the album debuted and peaked at number fifteen on the Billboard 200, number four on the Top R&B/Hip-Hop Albums chart and number one on the Independent Albums chart, failing however to chart outside the US - making it Evans' only album since her debut Faith to chart in the US only. Something About Faith has spawned the single and music video "Gone Already"; which spent over thirty-three weeks on the US Billboard Hot R&B/Hip-Hop Songs chart, where it peaked at number twenty-two.

A prominent feature, Evans has contributed guest vocals to more than sixty collaborations on other artists' albums. Her 1997 tribute single featuring Puff Daddy and 112, "I'll Be Missing You", became her biggest-selling hit to date and won her a Grammy Award in 1998.

== Albums ==
=== Studio albums ===
List of albums, with selected chart positions, sales figures and certifications
Title	Album details	Peak chart positions						Sales	Certifications (sales threshold)
Title	Album details	US	US R&B /HH	BEL (FL)	BEL (WA)	SWI	UK	Sales	Certifications (sales threshold)
Faith	Release date: August 29, 1995; Label: Bad Boy; Format: CD, cassette, digital download	22	2	—	—	—	—		RIAA: Platinum
Keep the Faith	Release date: October 27, 1998; Label: Bad Boy; Format: CD, LP, cassette, digital download	6	3	—	—	—	69		RIAA: Platinum
Faithfully	Release date: November 6, 2001; Label: Bad Boy; Format: CD, LP, cassette, digital download	14	2	—	—	—	193	US: 834,000 (Note: United States sales figure for Faithfully, as of 2005.)	RIAA: Gold
The First Lady	Release date: April 5, 2005; Label: Capitol; Format: CD, LP, digital download	2	1	—	—	89	22		RIAA: Gold
A Faithful Christmas	Release date: October 25, 2005; Label: Capitol; Format: CD, digital download	—	70	—	—	—	—		
Something About Faith	Release date: October 5, 2010; Label: eOne, Prolific; Format: CD, digital download	15	4	—	—	—	—	US: 77,000 (Note: United States sales figure for Something About Faith, as of 2012.)	
Incomparable	Release date: November 24, 2014; Label: Prolific, BMG Chrysalis; Format: CD, digital download	—	27	—	—	—	—		
The King & I	Release date: May 19, 2017; Label: Rhino; Format: CD, LP, digital download	65	9	174	132	—	—	US: 24,000 (Note: United States sales figure for The King & I, as of 2018.)	
"—" denotes a recording that did not chart or was not released in that territory.

=== Compilation albums ===
List of compilation albums, with selected chart positions
Title	Album details	Peak chart position	
Title	Album details	US	US R&B /HH
R&B Divas	Release date: October 2, 2012; Label: Prolific, eOne; Format: CD, digital download	46	6

== Singles ==
=== As lead artist ===
List of singles, with selected chart positions and certifications, showing year released and album name
Title	Year	Peak chart positions										Certifications	Albums
Title	Year	US	US R&B /HH	AUS	BEL (WA)	FRA	NLD	NOR	NZ	SWE	UK	Certifications	Albums
"You Used to Love Me"	1995	24	4	—	—	—	—	—	—	—	42	RIAA: Gold	Faith
"Soon as I Get Home"	1995	21	3	—	—	—	—	—	—	—	—	RIAA: Gold	Faith
"Ain't Nobody"	1996	67	14	—	—	—	—	—	—	—	—		Faith
"Kissing You"	1996	67	14	—	—	—	—	—	—	—	—		Waiting to Exhale: Original Soundtrack Album
"Come Over"	1996	— (Note: "Come Over" did not enter the US Billboard Hot 100, but peaked at number 9 on the US Bubbling Under Hot 100 chart.)	56	—	—	—	—	—	—	—	—		Faith
"I'll Be Missing You" (with Puff Daddy featuring 112)	1997	1	1	1	1	2	1	1	1	1	1	RIAA: 3× Platinum; ARIA: 2× Platinum; BEA: 4× Platinum; BPI: 4× Platinum; GLF: 3× Platinum; IFPI NOR: Platinum; NVPI: 2× Platinum; RMNZ: 4× Platinum; SNEP: Gold	No Way Out
"Love Like This"	1998	7	2	58	—	29	79	—	33	—	24	RIAA: Gold; BPI: Silver; RMNZ: Platinum	Keep the Faith
"All Night Long" (featuring Puff Daddy)	1999	9	3	—	—	—	78	—	29	—	23		Keep the Faith
"Never Gonna Let You Go"	1999	17	1	—	—	—	—	—	—	—	—		Keep the Faith
"Lately I"	1999	— (Note: "Lately I" did not enter the US Billboard Hot 100, but peaked at number 25 on the US Adult R&B Songs chart.)	78	—	—	—	—	—	—	—			Keep the Faith
"Can't Believe" (featuring Carl Thomas)	2001	56	14	—	—	—	—	—	—	—	—		Faithfully
"You Gets No Love"	2001	38	8	69	—	—	—	—	—	—	124		Faithfully
"I Love You"	2002	14	2	—	—	—	—	—	—	—	—		Faithfully
"Burnin' Up" (featuring Missy Elliott)	2002	60	19	—	—	—	—	—	—	—	—		Faithfully
"Alone in This World"	2002	—	73	—	—	—	—	—	—	—	—		Faithfully
"Again"	2005	47	7	49	— (Note: "Again" did not enter the Ultratop 50, but peaked at number 15 on the Ultratip Bubbling Under chart.)	—	—	—	—	—	12		The First Lady
"Mesmerized"	2005	— (Note: "Mesmerized" did not enter the US Billboard Hot 100, but peaked at number 15 on the US Adult R&B Songs chart.)	56	41	22	—	19	—	—	—	48		The First Lady
"Tru Love"	2006	— (Note: "Tru Love" did not enter the US Billboard Hot 100, but peaked at number 5 on the US Bubbling Under Hot 100 chart.)	27	—	—	—	—	—	—	—	—		The First Lady
"Way You Move" (featuring Snoop Dogg)	2010	—	—	—	—	—	—	—	—	—	—		Something About Faith
"Gone Already"	2010	— (Note: "Gone Already" did not enter the US Billboard Hot 100, but peaked at number 6 on the US Adult R&B Songs chart.)	26	—	—	—	—	—	—	—	—		Something About Faith
"Lovin' Me" (R&B Divas Theme) (featuring Nicci Gilbert, Monifah, Syleena Johnson and Keke Wyatt)	2012	—	—	—	—	—	—	—	—	—	—		R&B Divas
"Tears of Joy"	2012	— (Note: "Tears of Joy" did not enter the US Billboard Hot 100, but peaked at number 4 on the US Adult R&B Songs chart.)	79	—	—	—	—	—	—	—	—		R&B Divas
"Dumb"	2012	—	—	—	—	—	—	—	—	—	—		R&B Divas
"I Deserve It" (featuring Missy Elliott and Sharaya J)	2014	— (Note: "I Deserve It" did not enter the US Billboard Hot 100, but peaked at number 19 on the US Adult R&B Songs chart.)	—	—	—	—	—	—	—	—	—		Incomparable
"Make Love" (featuring KeKe Wyatt)	2015	—	—	—	—	—	—	—	—	—	—		Incomparable
"Party on the West Coast" (with Matoma and The Notorious B.I.G. featuring Snoop Dogg)	2017	—	—	—	—	—	—	16	—	33	—		Non-album singles
"A Minute" (with Stevie J)	2018	—	—	—	—	—	—	—	—	—	—		Non-album singles
"Between the Lines" (with Gwen Bunn)	2021	— (Note: "Between the Lines" did not enter the US Billboard Hot 100, but peaked at number 15 on the US Adult R&B Songs chart.)	—	—	—	—	—	—	—	—	—		Non-album singles
"Right Now" (featuring Big Knock)	2021	—	—	—	—	—	—	—	—	—	—		Non-album singles
"Love Like This" (stripped version; remix)	2021	—	—	—	—	—	—	—	—	—	—		Non-album singles
"Gotta Have Faith" (with Slim and Eric Bellinger)	2023	—	—	—	—	—	—	—	—	—	—		Non-album singles
"—" denotes a recording that did not chart or was not released in that territory.

=== As featured artist ===
List of singles, with selected chart positions and certifications, showing year released and album name
Title	Year	Peak chart positions										Certifications	Albums
Title	Year	US	US R&B /HH	AUS	BEL (WA)	FIN	FRA	GER	SWE	SWI	UK	Certifications	Albums
"How Can We Stop" (Horace Brown featuring Faith Evans)	1996	— (Note: "How Can We Stop" did not enter the US Billboard Hot 100, but peaked at number 25 on the US Bubbling Under Hot 100 chart.)	77	—	—	—	—	—	—	—	—		Horace Brown
"Stressed Out" (A Tribe Called Quest featuring Faith Evans and Consequence)	1996	— (Note: "Stressed Out" did not enter the US Billboard Hot 100, but peaked at number 8 on the US Bubbling Under Hot 100 chart.)	56	—	—	—	—	—	—	—	33		Beats, Rhymes and Life
"You Could Be My Boo" (The Almighty RSO featuring Faith Evans)	1996	— (Note: "You Could Be My Boo" did not enter the US Billboard Hot 100, but peaked at number 4 on the US Bubbling Under Hot 100 chart.)	49	—	—	—	—	—	—	—	—		Doomsday: Forever RSO
"Heartbreak Hotel" (Whitney Houston featuring Faith Evans & Kelly Price)	1998	2	1	17	— (Note: "Heartbreak Hotel" did not enter the Ultratop 50, but peaked at number 12 on the Ultratip Bubbling Under chart.)	—	7	61	—	77	25	RIAA: 2× Platinum	My Love Is Your Love
"How's It Goin' Down" (DMX featuring Faith Evans)	1998	70	19	—	—	—	—	—	—	—	—	RIAA: Gold	It's Dark and Hell Is Hot
"Georgy Porgy" (Eric Benet featuring Faith Evans)	1999	55	15	—	— (Note: "Georgy Porgy" did not enter the Ultratop 50, but peaked at number 15 on the Ultratip Bubbling Under chart.)	—	40	82	36	—	28		A Day in the Life
"Love Is Blind" (Eve featuring Faith Evans)	2000	34	11	—	—	—	—	—	—	—	—		Let There Be Eve…Ruff Ryders' First Lady
"Roll with Me" (Diddy featuring 8 Ball & MJG & Faith Evans)	2001	—	—	—	—	—	—	—	—	—	—		The Saga Continues
"You" (Bad Boy Family featuring Faith Evans, 112, Carl Thomas, Mario Winans, Thelma Guyton, Asia & Ashley, Tammy Ruggeri and Hezekiah Walker)	2001	— (Note: "You" did not enter the US Billboard Hot 100, but peaked at number 29 on the US Adult R&B Songs chart.)	—	—	—	—	—	—	—	—	—		Thank You
"Ma, I Don't Love Her" (Clipse featuring Faith Evans)	2002	86	40	—	—	—	—	—	—	—	38		Lord Willin'
"Brown Sugar (Extra Sweet)" (Mos Def featuring Faith Evans)	2002	—	95	—	—	—	—	—	—	—	—		Brown Sugar: Music from the Motion Picture Soundtrack
"Relax Your Mind" (Boyz II Men featuring Faith Evans)	2002	— (Note: "Relax Your Mind" did not enter the US Billboard Hot 100, but peaked at number 10 on the US Adult R&B Songs chart.)	52	—	—	—	—	—	—	—	—		Full Circle
"I Miss You" (DMX featuring Faith Evans)	2002	86	37	—	—	—	—	87	—	—	—		The Great Depression
"I Thought I Told You That" (Anastasia featuring Faith Evans)	2002	—	—	—	—	—	—	—	—	—	—		Freak of Nature
"Someday" (Scarface featuring Faith Evans)	2002	—	60	—	—	—	—	—	—	—	—		The Fix
"Hope" (Twista featuring Faith Evans)	2005	31	24	48	— (Note: "Hope" did not enter the Ultratop 50, but peaked at number 9 on the Ultratip Bubbling Under chart.)	14	—	—	—	—	25	RMNZ: Gold	Coach Carter: Music from the Motion Picture
"Everything Is Alright" (Red Cafe featuring Faith Evans)	2006	—	—	—	—	—	—	—	—	—	—		Non-album single
"Got 2 Be Down" (Robin Thicke featuring Faith Evans)	2007	— (Note: "Got 2 Be Down" did not enter the US Billboard Hot 100, but peaked at number 24 on the US Adult R&B Songs chart.)	60	—	—	—	—	—	—	—	—		The Evolution of Robin Thicke
"Letter to B.I.G." (Jadakiss featuring Faith Evans)	2009	—	125	—	—	—	—	—	—	—	—		The Last Kiss
"Can't Last a Day" (Teena Marie featuring Faith Evans)	2009	— (Note: "Can't Last a Day" did not enter the US Billboard Hot 100, but peaked at number 13 on the US Adult R&B Songs chart.)	41	—	—	—	—	—	—	—	—		Congo Square
"Hood Pride" (Capone-N-Noreaga featuring Faith Evans)	2010	—	—	—	—	—	—	—	—	—	—		The War Report 2: Report the War
"Lay with You" (El DeBarge featuring Faith Evans)	2010	— (Note: "Lay with You" did not enter the US Billboard Hot 100, but peaked at number 12 on the US Bubbling Under Hot 100 chart and number 2 on the US Adult R&B Songs chart.)	20	—	—	—	—	—	—	—	—		Second Chance
"Believe It" (Fonzworth Bentley featuring Faith Evans)	2011	—	—	—	—	—	—	—	—	—	—		C.O.L.O.U.R.S.
"Crazy (Baby)" (Rahsaan Patterson featuring Faith Evans)	2011	— (Note: "Crazy (Baby)" did not enter the US Billboard Hot 100, but peaked at number 20 on the US Adult R&B Songs chart.)	97	—	—	—	—	—	—	—	—		Bleuphoria
"Stay (Remix)" (Tyrese featuring Faith Evans & Rick Ross)	2011	—	—	—	—	—	—	—	—	—	—		Open Invitation
"No Betta" (Deitrick Haddon Presents Voices of Unity featuring Faith Evans)	2012	— (Note: "No Betta" did not enter the US Billboard Hot 100, but peaked at number 29 on the US Hot Gospel Songs chart.)	—	—	—	—	—	—	—	—	—		A Beautiful Soul (Music Inspired By The Motion Picture)
"Rejoice with Me!" (Bobby Jones featuring Faith Evans)	2013	— (Note: "Rejoice with Me!" did not enter the US Billboard Hot 100, but peaked at number 17 on the US Hot Gospel Songs chart.)	—	—	—	—	—	—	—	—	—		Rejoice with Me!
"I Feel Good, I Look Good, I'm God Good" (Full Force featuring Faith Evans with Sheila E & The God Good Choir & Children)	2014	—	—	—	—	—	—	—	—	—	—		Full Force: With Love From Our Friends
"Love Like This" (Tommy Trash & Henry Fong featuring Faith Evans)	2014	—	—	—	—	—	—	—	—	—	—		Non-album single
"Bless Somebody Else (Dorothy's Song)" (Kurt Carr featuring the Kurt Carr Singers & Friends)	2019	— (Note: "Bless Somebody Else (Dorothy's Song)" did not enter the US Billboard Hot 100, but peaked at number 18 on the US Hot Gospel Songs chart and number 12 on the US Gospel Digital Songs chart.)	—	—	—	—	—	—	—	—	—		Bless Somebody Else
"—" denotes a recording that did not chart or was not released in that territory.

=== Promotional singles ===
List of singles, with selected chart positions, showing year released and album name
Title	Year	Peak chart positions	Albums
Title	Year	US Adult R&B	Albums
"I Just Can't"	1996	39	High School High soundtrack
"Nothing Without You" (Karen Clark Sheard featuring Faith Evans)	1998	27	Finally Karen
"Do My Thang"	2005	—	The First Lady
"Christmas Without You" (Eric Benét featuring Faith Evans)	2012	—	Non-album single
"Fragile"	2014	—	Incomparable
"—" denotes a recording that did not chart or was not released in that territory.

=== Other charted and certified songs ===
List of singles, with selected chart positions, showing year released and album name
Title	Year	Peak chart positions				Certifications	Albums
Title	Year	US Adult R&B	US Gospel	US Gospel Digital	KOR Int.	Certifications	Albums
"Do Your Time"	2001	—	—	—	87		Faithfully
"1970 Somethin'"	2005	—	—	—	—	RMNZ: Platinum	Duets: The Final Chapter
"Santa Baby"	2006	40	—	—	—		A Faithful Christmas
"I Still"	2010	—	—	—	69		Something About Faith
"Troubled World" (featuring Kelly Price and Jessica Reedy)	2010	—	—	23	—		Something About Faith
"Troubled World, Pt. 2" (featuring Estelle and Lil' Mo)	2010	—	—	15	—		Something About Faith
"Saved" (Snoop Dogg featuring Faith Evans and 3rd Generation (Bereal Family)	2018	—	24	22	—		Bible of Love
"—" denotes a recording that did not chart or was not released in that territory.

== Other guest appearances ==
List of non-single guest appearances, with other performing artists, showing year released and album name
Title	Year	Other artist(s)	Album
"One More Chance"	1994	Notorious B.I.G., Mary J. Blige	Ready to Die
"On My Mind"	1996	Color Me Badd	Now & Forever
"I Can't Believe"	1996	112	112
"Christmas Lullabye"	1996	—N/a	12 Soulful Nights of Christmas
"All the Times"	1997	LSG, Missy Elliott, Coko	Levert.Sweat.Gill
"Every Nation"	1997	Red Hot R+B All Stars	Diana, Princess of Wales: Tribute
"For Awhile"	1998	112	Room 112
"If You Leave Me"	1998	Aaron Hall	Inside of You
"Is It Real?"	1998	Jeff Blake	NFL Jams
"We're All in This Together"	1998	Various Artists	NFL Jams
"Right Back Where I Started"	data-sort-value="" style="background: var(--background-color-interactive, #ececec); color: var(--color-base, inherit); vertical-align: middle; text-align: center; " class="table-na" | —N/a	In the Meantime: The Music That Tells the Story	
"Good Life"	2000	Funkmaster Flex	The Mix Tape IV
"Easier"	2000	Kandi Burruss	Hey Kandi...
"Crown"	2000	Natalie Wilson & The S.O.P. Chorale	Girl Director
"2 B Real 2000 (Keep It Real)"	2000	DJ Hurricane, Lost Boyz	Don't Sleep
"Everyday"	2001	G-Dep	Child of the Ghetto
"Overjoyed"	2001	Jon B.	Pleasures U Like
"What's Going On (Neptunes Mix)"	2001	Artists Against AIDS Worldwide	
"A Dream"	2002	Jay-Z, Notorious B.I.G.	The Blueprint 2: The Gift & the Curse
"You Gets No Love" (Remix)	2002	G-Dep	We Invented the Remix Vol. 1
"Hurting Woman"	2003	Shirley Caesar	Shirley Caesar and Friends
"Sister"	2003	Kelly Price	Priceless
"Don't Cross the Line"	2003	Freeway	Philadelphia Freeway
"We Know"	2004	Talib Kweli	The Beautiful Struggle
"Say a Prayer"	2004	Donald Lawrence	I Speak Life
"Wake Up Everybody"	2004	Various Artists	Wake Up Everybody
"Don't Need Your Love"	2005	The Game	The Documentary
"Southern Comfort"	2005	Shooter Jennings, Jessi Colter, CeCe White	Put the "O" Back in Country
"Living the Life"	2006	Notorious B.I.G, Ludacris, Snoop Dogg	Duets: The Final Chapter
"Got 2 Be Down"	2006	Robin Thicke	The Evolution of Robin Thicke
"Gonna Get It"	2006	Boney James	Shine
"Endow Me"	2006	Coko, Fantasia, Lil' Mo	Grateful
"O Holy Night"	2008	Nat King Cole	The Nat King Cole Holiday Collection
"So Gone"	2008	Slim	Love's Crazy
"So Fly" (Remix)	2008	Slim, Big Boi	Love's Crazy
"Letter to B.I.G."	2009	Jadakiss	The Last Kiss
"Can't Last a Day"	2009	Teena Marie	Congo Square
"Love's Doors"	2009	DJ Komori	The Exclusives - R&B Hits Vol.3
"Clap"	2010	Saigon	The Greatest Story Never Told
"Don't U Know Me By Now"	2010	Brian Culbertson	XII
"Hood Pride"	2010	Capone-N-Noreaga	The War Report 2: Report the War
"Lay with You"	2010	El DeBarge	Second Chance
"Feel Good"	2010	Eric Benét	Lost in Time
"All I Do"	2010	Redman	Redman Presents... Reggie
"If I Fall In Love Again"	2010	Keyshia Cole	Calling All Hearts
"Crazy (Baby)"	2011	Rahsaan Patterson	Bleuphoria
"Believe It"	2011	Fonzworth Bentley	C.O.L.O.U.R.S. by Derek Watkins
"Doctor Love"	2011	Jessica Reedy	From the Heart
"Stay" (Remix)	2011	Tyrese, Rick Ross	Open Invitation
"Perfect Man" (Remix)	2012	Lil' Mo	P.S. I Love Me
"Two of Us"	2012	Q Parker	MANual
"Voice of Reason"	2012	Qwizman, Logic	non-album release
"Hold You Down"	2013	Raekwon	Lost Jewlry
"You Own Me"	2013	Robert Glasper	Black Radio 2
"You Make Me Feel"	2014	J. Moss	Grown Folks Gospel
"I Feel Good, I Look Good, I'm God Good"	2014	Full Force, Sheila E., The God Good Choir & Children	With Love from Our Friends
"Last Time"	2015	MC Lyte, Coko	Legend
"With You"	2015	Erick Sermon	E.S.P. (Erick Sermon's Perception)
"When I Luv "	2017	Mike City	The Feel Good Agenda Vol. 1

== Soundtracks ==
Year	Song	Artist(s)	Album
1995	"Kissing You"	Faith Evans	Waiting to Exhale: Original Soundtrack Album
1995	"Somebody Bigger Than You and I"	Whitney Houston featuring Faith Evans, Bobby Brown, R. Tresvant, J. Gill & Monica	The Preacher's Wife: Original Soundtrack Album
1996	"I Just Can't"	Faith Evans	High School High: The Soundtrack
1997	"Until the Day (Remix)"	Faith Evans with Nonchalant	Living Single
1997	"My Everything"	Faith Evans with Barry White	Money Talks: The Album
1998	"Tears Away"	Faith Evans	Hav Plenty: Music from the Motion Picture
1999	"Best Man"	Faith Evans	The Best Man: Music from the Motion Picture
1999	"Mailman"	Faith Evans	Wild Wild West: Music Inspired by the Motion Picture
2001	"Good Life (Remix)"	Faith Evans featuring Ja Rule, Vita & Caddillac Tah	The Fast and the Furious: Original Motion Picture Soundtrack
2002	"Brown Sugar (Extra Sweet)"	Mos Def featuring Faith Evans	Brown Sugar: Music from the Motion Picture Soundtrack
2002	"Heaven Knows"	Faith Evans	The Fighting Temptations: Music from the Motion Picture
2005	"Hope"	Twista featuring Faith Evans	Coach Carter: Music from the Motion Picture
2009	"One More Chance (Remix)"	The Notorious B.I.G. featuring Faith Evans	Notorious: Music from and Inspired by the Original Motion Picture
2009	"Letter to B.I.G."	Jadakiss featuring Faith Evans	Notorious: Music from and Inspired by the Original Motion Picture
2009	"The Legacy Remix"	The Notorious B.I.G. featuring CJ & Faith Evans	Notorious: Music from and Inspired by the Original Motion Picture
2009	"If You Dream"	Tank feat. Faith Evans, Toni Braxton, Omarion & others	Music Inspired by the Film More than a Game
2012	"No Betta"	Deitrick Haddon feat. Faith Evans	A Beautiful Soul

== See also ==
- List of number-one hits (United States)
- List of artists who reached number one on the Hot 100 (U.S.)
- List of number-one rhythm and blues hits (United States)
- List of number-one dance hits (United States)
- List of artists who reached number one on the U.S. Dance chart

== Notes ==
- A Promotional release only.

Charts
