= El DeBarge discography =

This is the discography documenting albums and singles released by American R&B singer El DeBarge.

== Albums ==
=== Studio albums ===
Year	Album details	Peak chart positions			Certifications (sales threshold)
Year	Album details	US Pop	US R&B	B&S UK R&B	Certifications (sales threshold)
1986	El DeBarge: Release date: July 14, 1986; Label: Gordy Records	24	8	—	RIAA: Gold
1989	Gemini: Release date: February 20, 1989; Label: Motown Records	—	35	—	
1992	In the Storm: Release date: March 17, 1992; Label: Warner Bros. Records	—	—	22	
1994	Heart, Mind and Soul: Release date: March 23, 1994; Label: Warner Bros. Records	137	24	—	
2010	Second Chance: Release date: November 30, 2010; Label: Interscope Records	57	13	—	
"—" denotes releases that did not chart

=== Compilation albums ===
Year	Album details
2003	Ultimate Collection: Release date: August 26, 2003; Label: Hip-O Records

== Singles ==
=== As lead artist ===
Year	Single	Peak chart positions								Album
Year	Single	US	US R&B	US Dance	US AC	NL	UK	CAN	CAN AC	Album
1986	"Who's Johnny"	3	1	10	18	7	60	1	7	El DeBarge
1986	"Love Always"	43	7	—	8	42	195	80	10	El DeBarge
1986	"Someone"	70	32	—	20	—	—	—	—	El DeBarge
1987	"Starlight Express"	—	—	—	30	—	—	—	—	Music & Songs from Starlight Express
1989	"Somebody Loves You"	—	24	—	—	—	—	—	—	Gemini
1989	"Real Love"	—	8	14	—	38	97	—	—	Gemini
1992	"You Know What I Like"	—	14	—	—	—	—	—	—	In the Storm
1992	"My Heart Belongs to You"	—	64	—	—	—	—	—	—	In the Storm
1992	"Another Chance"	—	62	—	—	—	—	—	—	In the Storm
1994	"Where Is My Love"	—	19	—	—	—	—	—	—	Heart, Mind and Soul
1994	"Can't Get Enough"	—	21	—	—	—	—	—	—	Heart, Mind and Soul
1994	"Slide"	—	36	—	—	—	—	—	—	Heart, Mind and Soul
1995	"Where You Are"	—	86	—	—	—	—	—	—	Heart, Mind and Soul
2010	"Second Chance"	—	41	—	—	—	—	—	—	Second Chance
2010	"Lay With You" (featuring Faith Evans)	—	20	—	—	—	—	—	—	Second Chance
"—" denotes releases that did not chart

=== As featured artist ===
Year	Single	Artist	Peak chart positions		Album
Year	Single	Artist	US	US R&B	Album
1990	"The Secret Garden"	Quincy Jones w/ Al B. Sure! James Ingram; Barry White	31	1	Back on the Block
1991	"All Through the Night"	Tone Lōc	80	16	Cool Hand Lōc
1991	"After the Dance"	Fourplay	—	2	Fourplay
1998	"Hand in Hand"	DJ Quik w/ 2nd II None	—	66	Rhythm-al-ism
