= Heart, Mind and Soul =

Heart, Mind and Soul may refer to:

- Heart, Mind and Soul (El DeBarge album), 1994
- Heart, Mind and Soul (TVXQ album), 2006
- Christian anthropology, a discussion of the components of humans
