= Ain't Nobody (Faith Evans song) =

1996 Faith Evans single

"Ain't Nobody/Kissing You"

Single by Faith Evans

from the album Faith
- Released: October 26, 1995
- Length: 5:13
- Label: Bad Boy; Arista
- Songwriters: Faith Evans; Sean Combs; Chucky Thompson
- Producers: Sean Combs; Chucky Thompson

Faith Evans singles chronology
"Soon as I Get Home" (1995)	"Ain't Nobody/Kissing You" (1995)	"Come Over" (1996)

"Ain't Nobody" is a song by American singer Faith Evans. It was written by Evans, Sean Combs and Chucky Thompson and produced by the latter two for her debut studio album, Faith (1995). Released as the album's third single along with "Kissing You" from the soundtrack of the romance film Waiting to Exhale (1995), "Ain't Nobody" peaked at numbers 25 and 67 on the US Cash Box Top 100 and Billboard Hot 100 charts, and number 14 on the Hot R&B/Hip-Hop Songs chart. On Christmas Day 2015, Evans released a re-recorded version of the song on Faith 20, a six-track album composed of remakes from Faith.

== Background ==
"Ain't Nobody" was written by Evans, Sean Combs and Chucky Thompson and produced by Combs and Thompson for her debut studio album Faith (1995). Thompson said it was influenced by the song "Can't Let Her Get Away" by Michael Jackson from his 1991 album Dangerous, telling Soul Culture in 2014: "I took some pieces from that record, but I took from the soul vibe that we had going on at Bad Boy. The crazy part about this song was I was using this new drum machine device which is called a classic now, but it was the MPC 3000. I found myself trying it out and ended up creating my first beat with it."

When he started on the music, Thompson didn't do the tracking until after Combs came to hear the song and gave him the go ahead to track it. When Thompson attempted the first time after Combs left, the plug came out from the machine and the entire track was erased – which led him having to do it all over again from scratch, though he still favored his original version: "Trust me, the first version of the record was way better than the version you ended up hearing on the album."

== Critical reception ==
Billboard magazine editor Larry Flick called the song "another pop/R&B-infused hip-hop kicker that casts Evans as a modern-day soul vixen — a role she plays to the hilt. She vamps with style and confidence against a backdrop of her own smooth and silky harmonies. The hook grabs you and never lets go, while the beat skittles and snakes up the spine. A perfect way to usher in the spring season, this is one of those singles that you'll find yourself swaying to even while in chill mode."

== Track listings ==
US CD single
No.	Title	Writer(s)	Producer(s)	Length
1.	"Ain't Nobody" (album version)	Faith Evans; Sean Combs; Chucky Thompson	Combs; Thompson	5:13
2.	"Kissing You"	Kenneth Edmonds	Babyface	3:23

US maxi single
No.	Title	Writer(s)	Producer(s)	Length
1.	"Ain't Nobody" (album version)	Evans; Combs; Thompson	Combs; Thompson	5:13
2.	"Ain't Nobody (Who Could Love Me)" (Puffy & Chucky remix featuring Queen Latifah)	Evans; Combs; Thompson; Dana Owens; David Wolinski	Combs; Thompson	4:18
3.	"Kissing You" (album version)	Edmonds	Babyface	3:23
4.	"Ain't Nobody (Who Could Love Me)" (Puffy & Chucky instrumental)	Evans; Combs; Thompson; Owens; Wolinski	Combs; Thompson	3:56
5.	"Ain't Nobody" (album version)	Evans; Combs; Thompson	Combs; Thompson	5:12

== Credits and personnel ==
Credits adapted from the liner notes of Faith.

- Carlton Batts – mastering engineer
- James Caruso – mixing engineer
- Sean Combs – producer, writer
- Faith Evans – vocalist, writer
- Paul Logus – recording engineer
- Gerardo Lopez – recording engineer
- Axel Niehaus – recording engineer
- Jon Shriver – second engineer
- Tony Smalios – recording engineer
- Chucky Thompson – producer, writer

== Charts ==
=== Weekly charts ===
Weekly chart performance for "Ain't Nobody"
Chart (1996)	Peak position
US Billboard Hot 100	67
US Hot R&B/Hip-Hop Songs (Billboard)	14
US Cash Box Top 100	25

=== Year-end charts ===
Year-end chart performance for "Ain't Nobody"
Chart (1996)	Position
US Hot R&B/Hip-Hop Songs (Billboard)	71
