= Second Chance (El DeBarge album) =

Studio album by El DeBarge
- Released: November 30, 2010
- Genre: R&B, soul, pop
- Length: 51:01
- Label: Geffen, Interscope
- Producer: Michael Angelo, The Avila Brothers, Christian Davis, El DeBarge (also exec.), Kenneth "Babyface" Edmonds, Ron Fair, Jimmy Jam & Terry Lewis, John Goux, Mike City, Victor "V Dubb" Wilson

El DeBarge chronology
Heart, Mind and Soul (1994)	Second Chance (2010)

Singles from Second Chance
- 1. "Second Chance" Released: August 17, 2010; 2. "Lay With You" Released: October 25, 2010

Second Chance is the fifth studio album by American R&B singer and songwriter El DeBarge. It was released on November 30, 2010, by Geffen Records and Interscope Records. It is his first studio album in 16 years and the follow-up to Heart, Mind and Soul (1994). Production for the album took place at various recording studios and was handled by DeBarge and several other record producers, including Ron Fair, Mike City, Michael Angelo, and Jimmy Jam & Terry Lewis.

The album debuted at number 57 on the Billboard 200 chart, selling 21,000 copies in its first week. It remained on the chart for 12 weeks and produced two singles, "Second Chance" and "Lay With You". Upon its release, Second Chance received acclaim from music critics, who complimented its material and praised DeBarge's singing. It was nominated for a Grammy Award for Best R&B Album, set to be presented at the 54th Grammy Awards in 2012.

== Background ==
The album is DeBarge's first studio release in 16 years, following a period of drug addiction and legal problems. After his release from prison in 2009, he was introduced by his manager, Pete Farmer, to music executives Ron Fair and Jimmy Iovine at Geffen and Interscope Records. DeBarge sang a cappella in his audition for the label. He later said of the meeting and audition, "we put a plan together and the minute I stepped into the studio I was so nervous, but I felt so much power just coming through me soon as I hit the microphone it was like, it was still there". He subsequently signed a recording deal with the label and began working on Second Chance.

== Recording ==
Recording sessions for the album took place at various recording studios, namely Capitol Studios, Flyte Tyme Studios, House of Music, MAS Sounds Studio, Mischkemusic Studios, No Excuses, Oceanway Studios, Redstar Recording, Shelter Studios, Sly Doggie Studios, Sounds Studio, The Boiler Room, The Boom Boom Room, and Unsung Studios. DeBarge co-wrote and co-produced the album, working with producers such as Jimmy Jam & Terry Lewis, Mike City, Ron Fair, The Avila Brothers, and Kenny "Babyface" Edmonds, who had worked with him on his previous album Heart, Mind and Soul (1994). He also worked with guest artists 50 Cent, Faith Evans, and Fabolous. DeBarge said of the album's music, "There's music to dance to and make love to, music to cry to. I'm starting from scratch, coming fresh. But my sound still embodies the same soulful, intricate harmonies".

== Release and promotion ==
"Format"
The song's narrator is insistent about sending his message—he has to see his lover in person—across through whatever social networking platform, making references to email, tweets, and texts.

"When I See You"
The primarily acoustic track is about the basics of romantic love and features a lush soundscape, delicate melody, and fingersnaps.

Second Chance was released by Geffen Records on November 30, 2010, in the United States. It debuted at number 57 on the U.S. Billboard 200 chart and sold 21,000 copies in its first week, the week ending December 18, 2010. It also entered at number 13 on Billboard's Top R&B/Hip-Hop Albums. The album spent 12 weeks on the Billboard 200. In the United Kingdom, Second Chance was released on February 11, 2011. It was also released as a two-disc deluxe edition, packaged with a bonus disc of Christmas-themed songs.

DeBarge made several well-received performances and reintroduced himself to the public. On June 27, 2010, he made his first media appearance since his prison release as a surprise guest at the 2010 BET Awards, performing a medley of his earlier hit songs as a member of DeBarge and as a solo artist, including "Second Chance". Subsequently, he opened for recording artist Vivian Green and performed at the 2010 Essence Music Festival in July. Throughout October 2010, he opened for recording artist Mary J. Blige on her Music Saved My Life Tour. He also made promotional appearances on BET's 106 & Park, The Steve Harvey Morning Show, and The Wendy Williams Show, as well as signing events at CD retailers in New York City, Chicago, and Houston during the album's release week.

The album's lead single, "Second Chance", was released on August 17, 2010 as a digital download. It debuted the following week at number 84 on the Billboard Hot R&B/Hip-Hop Songs chart. It spent two weeks on the chart and peaked at number 41. "Second Chance" earned DeBarge two Grammy Award nominations, for Best Male R&B Vocal Performance and Best R&B Song, presented at the 53rd Grammy Awards in 2011. The album's second single, "Lay with You", features Faith Evans and was released on October 25, 2010. It reached number 20 and spent 14 weeks on the Hot R&B/Hip-Hop Songs chart.

In promotion of Second Chance, DeBarge headlined an eight-date national tour in October, coinciding with concert dates for Blige's tour. In December, he toured with recording artist Fantasia and performed on The Mo'Nique Show and The View. He was scheduled to tour during the Spring in the United States with Kem and Ledisi, beginning February 17, 2011, but withdrew after checking himself into a rehabilitation center to address his drug abuse. Recording artist Musiq Soulchild served as his replacement on the tour.

== Critical reception ==
Professional ratings
Review scores
Source	Rating
AllMusic	4/5 stars
The Dallas Morning News	B+
Entertainment Weekly	B+
MSN Music (Expert Witness)	A−
Okayplayer	82/100
PopMatters	8/10
USA Today	3.5/4 stars

Second Chance was met with widespread critical acclaim. At Metacritic, which assigns a normalized rating out of 100 to reviews from mainstream publications, the album received an average score of 84, based on six reviews.

Reviewing the album for AllMusic, Andy Kellman called it "one of the year's best R&B albums" and applauded its "sweet love songs — pleasurable, fresh updates of his tried and true approach", adding that DeBarge's voice "remains capable of elevating substandard material, not that there is much of it here". Entertainment Weekly's Mikael Wood commented that "his ethereal vocals still shimmer so effortlessly", and called it "the year's most elegant tell-all". Sarah Rodman of The Boston Globe wrote that "DeBarge simply soars, his feather-light vocals still in top form". Steve Jones of USA Today felt that DeBarge's "sweet, soaring falsetto remains intact, and he has lost none of his knack for writing catchy, romantic tunes". The Huffington Post's Marlynn Snyder critiqued that "the effort to surround [DeBarge] with a mix of both established, hit-making songwriters and producers, and younger creative voices, is a rousing success".

Steve Horowitz from PopMatters claimed that the album's material "succeeds to a large extent simply because it addresses a wide demographic". Mario Tarradell of The Dallas Morning News praised DeBarge's "melodic soul-pop" vocals and described the album as "an elegant effort that updates his style without obliterating it". Okayplayer's E. Esi Arthur wrote that the album "does an efficient job of lining up songs where his unique vocal styling is in the front seat". In MSN Music, Robert Christgau found DeBarge's voice "unspoiled" and said his "special gift has always been combining the boyish innocence of J5-era Michael Jackson with intimations of physical congress. The quirky murmurs, yelps, and coos of his head voice, a high end of unequalled softness and give, sound responsive where Jackson's sound willed. There's a girl there, or just as likely a grown woman. And whether or not El seems manly to you, he's turning her on and vice versa".

== Track listing ==
No.	Title	Writer(s)	Producer(s)	Length
1.	"Lay With You" (featuring Faith Evans)	Ericka J. Coulter; Michael Flowers	Mike City	3:41
2.	"Heaven"	Jamal Jones; India Boodram; Jazmyn Boodram	Awesome Jones	4:42
3.	"Close to You"	Flowers	City; Ron Fair^{[a]}	3:40
4.	"Format" (featuring 50 Cent)	Christian Davis; E. DeBarge; Curtis Jackson; Victor "V Dubb" Wilson	Davis; Wilson^{[b]}; Fair^{[a]}	4:08
5.	"When I See You"	Mischke Butler; E. DeBarge; Kenneth Edmonds; Fair	Fair	4:17
6.	"How Can You Love Me"	E. DeBarge; Bobby Ross Avila; Issiah J. Avila; James Harris III; Terry Lewis	The Avila Brothers	4:09
7.	"Serenading"	Flowers	City	4:03
8.	"5 Seconds" (featuring Fabolous)	Douglas E. Davis; Michael Angelo Saulsberry; Michael Kurt Jackson; John Jackson; Ricky Walters; Etterlene Jordan; E. DeBarge; Mark DeBarge	E. DeBarge; Michael Angelo	3:32
9.	"Joyful"	E. DeBarge; Harris III; Lewis	Jimmy Jam & Terry Lewis	4:43
10.	"Sexy Lady"	Angelo; E. DeBarge; M. Jackson	Angelo	2:51
11.	"Sad Songs"	E. DeBarge; Harris; Lewis; TuneDaRula	Jimmy Jam & Terry Lewis	3:18
12.	"The Other Side"	E. DeBarge; Harris; Lewis	Jimmy Jam & Terry Lewis	4:17
13.	"Second Chance"	E. DeBarge; Butler	Fair	3:40

Deluxe edition bonus disc
No.	Title	Writer(s)	Producer(s)	Length
1.	"Silent Night"	Traditional	John Goux	2:37
2.	"Christmas Without You"	B. Avila; I. Avila; E. DeBarge; Sam Salter; Rick Thomson	The Avila Brothers	4:14
3.	"Heart Full of Love"	B. Avila; I. Avila; E. DeBarge; Salter; Eddie Serrano	The Avila Brothers	4:48

Notes

- ^{^a} denotes additional producer
- ^{^b} denotes co-producer

Sample credits

- "5 Seconds" contains elements of "Stay with Me", written by Mark DeBarge and Etterlene Jordan, and "The Show", written by Ricky Walters and Doug Davis.

== Personnel ==
Credits for Second Chance adapted from Allmusic.

=== Musicians ===
- Nico Abondolo – bass
- Bobby Ross Avila – bass, celeste, drum programming, drums, guitar, percussion, piano
- Rick Baptist – horn
- Charlie Bisharat – violin
- Chris Bleth – alto flute, oboe
- Jackie Brand – violin
- Rob Brophy – viola
- Roberto Cani – violin
- Lily Ho Chen – violin
- El DeBarge – background vocals, executive producer, keyboards, piano, producer, vocoder
- Brian Dembow – viola
- Thomas Diener – viola
- Bruce Dukov – violin
- Steve Erdody – celli
- Faith Evans – vocals
- Nina Evtuhov – violin
- Matt Funes – viola
- Julie Gigante – violin
- Henry Gronnier – violin
- Trevor Handy – celli
- Thomas Harte Jr. – bass
- Gerardo Hilera – violin
- Hot Sauce – guitar
- Tiffany Hu – violin
- Iz – drums, percussion
- Suzie Katayama – conductor, string arrangements
- Carole Kleister-Castillo – viola
- Paul Klintworth – horn
- Armen Ksajikian – celli
- Razdan Kuyumjian – violin
- Tim Landauer – celli
- Songa Lee – violin
- Natalie Leggett – violin
- Warren Leuning – horn
- Gayle Levant – harp
- Phillip Levy – violin
- Jeanie Lim – viola
- Mario Deleon – violin
- Leo Mellace – guitar
- Joe Meyer – horn
- Vicki Miskolczy – viola
- Helen Nightengale – violin
- Robin Olson – violin
- Aaron Oltman – viola
- Sid Paige – violin
- Alyssa Park – violin
- Sara Parkins – violin
- Jason Perry – keyboards
- Robert Peterson – violin
- Katia Popov – violin
- Bill Reichenbach – horn
- Steve Richards – celli
- Ryan Roberts – bass
- Shannon Rubicam – background vocals
- Tereza Stanislav – violin
- Rudolph Stein – celli
- Tammy Hatwan – violin
- Sarah Thornblade – violin
- Tim Loo – celli
- Cecilia Tsan – celli
- Josefina Vergara – violin
- John Wittenberg – violin
- Yelena Yegoryan – violin
- Ken Yerke – violin

=== Production ===
- Michael Angelo – engineer, producer
- The Avila Brothers – producer
- Mike City – arranger, engineer, producer
- Corey Shoemaker – engineer
- Christian Davis – engineer, producer
- Kenneth "Babyface" Edmonds – producer
- Ron Fair – A&R, additional production, bass, conductor, drum programming, executive producer, guitar, harmonica, orchestral arrangements, piano, producer
- Pete Farmer – A&R, executive producer
- Todd Gallopo – art direction, design
- Clark Germain – engineer
- John Goux – arranger, engineer, guitar, producer, programming
- Alicia Graham – A&R
- Jeff Halbert – engineer
- Tal Herzberg – engineer, Pro-Tools
- Jean-Marie Horvat – mixing
- Buffy Hubelbank – A&R
- Bernard Jacobs – stylist
- Jimmy Jam – keyboards, percussion, producer, strings, vocal engineer
- John Norten – engineer
- Tiffany Johnson – product manager
- Christian Lantry – photography
- Terry Lewis – producer, vocal engineer
- Matt Marrin – mixing
- George Merrill – background vocals, engineer
- Dwight Mikkelsen – music preparation
- Mischke Butler – background vocals, engineer, vocal producer
- Gabe Moffatt – engineer
- Peter Mokran – mixing
- Jen Montgomery – design
- Tal Oz – assistant, engineer
- Zach Redding – assistant, mixing assistant
- Sam Salter – vocal producer
- Les Scurry – production manager
- Wesley Seidman – assistant
- Allen Sides – engineer, string engineer
- Mike Snodgress – marketing coordinator
- Jeremy Stevenson – engineer
- Eric Weaver – assistant, mixing assistant
- Tremaine Williams – engineer
- Victor "V Dubb" Wilson – producer
- Ianthe Zevos – creative art

== Charts ==
Chart (2010)	Peak position
US Billboard 200	57
US Top R&B/Hip-Hop Albums (Billboard)	13
