= Come Over (Faith Evans song) =

Single by Faith Evans

from the album Faith
- Released: January 24, 1996
- Length: 5:35
- Label: Bad Boy; Arista
- Songwriters: Faith Evans; Floyd Howard; Sean Combs; Chucky Thompson
- Producers: Sean Combs; Chucky Thompson

Faith Evans singles chronology
"Ain't Nobody" (1995)	"Come Over" (1996)	"You Could Be My Boo" (1996)

"Come Over" is a song by American recording artist Faith Evans. It was written by Evans, Floyd Howard, Sean Combs, and Chucky Thompson for her debut studio album Faith (1995), while production was helmed by Combs and Thompson. Released as the album's fourth and final single in 1996, the song reached number 56 on the Hot R&B/Hip-Hop Songs chart and number 9 on the Bubbling Under Hot 100 chart.

== Background ==
"Come Over" was written by Evans, Floyd Howard, Sean Combs and Chucky Thompson and produced by Combs and Thompson for her debut studio album Faith (1995). The song was initially supposed to be an interlude. However, Evans insisted it should be made into a full track. Commenting on their decision to enhance "Come Over," Thompson told Soul Culture in 2014: "This song started out as an interlude because I felt that Faith’s whole vibe was straight from the church. She used to sit with me and play records from The Clark Sisters. I just felt that altar call vibe and sensation with her whenever we were together in the studio working. The song came out as combination of gospel and Guy-like influences from the R&B side of things."

== Critical reception ==
In his July 1996 review for Billboard, Larry Flick noted that "Come Over" proves that there was "no lack of single choices from [Evans'] sterling [debut album]. Actually, this may prove to be set's biggest and best offering to date. Evans comes on like a baby Gladys Knight, wailing over the track's languid and soulful hip hop groove. The song's smooth and harmonious chorus is a lovely icing to verses that ooze with warmth and romance. A must-hear for pop, R&B, and even AC radio listeners."

== Track listings ==
US CD single
No.	Title	Length
1.	"Come Over" (single edit)	3:59
2.	"Come Over" (album version instrumental)	5:35

== Credits and personnel ==
Credits adapted from the liner notes of Faith.

- Lane Craven – recording engineer
- Sean Combs – producer, writer
- Faith Evans – vocalist, writer
- Floyd Howard – writer
- Paul Logus – recording engineer
- Axel Niehaus – mixing engineer
- Jon Shriver – recording engineer
- Kevin Thomas – recording engineer
- Chucky Thompson – producer, writer

== Charts ==
Weekly chart performance for "Come Over"
Chart (1996)	Peak position
US Hot R&B/Hip-Hop Songs (Billboard)	56
US Bubbling Under Hot 100 (Billboard)	9
