= Something About Faith =

Studio album by Faith Evans
- Released: October 5, 2010
- Genre: R&B
- Length: 58:38
- Labels: Prolific; E1
- Producers: Anthony Bell; Ben Briggs III; Patrick Briggs; Carvin & Ivan; Mike City; Faith Evans; Todd Russaw; KayTwo; Malik Pendleton; Salaam Remi; Darrell Robinson; Kye Russaw; Gil Smith II; Ibrahim "Ibe" Soliman; Chucky Thompson; Brad Todd

Faith Evans chronology
A Faithful Christmas (2005)	Something About Faith (2010)	R&B Divas (2012)

Singles from Something About Faith
- 1. "Gone Already" Released: August 10, 2010

Something About Faith is the sixth studio album by American singer Faith Evans. It was released on Prolific Music Group on October 5, 2010, in the United States. Distributed by E1 Music, the album marked Evans' first independent release, following her departure from Bad Boy Records in 2003 and her subsequent but short-lived engagement with Capitol Records in 2005. Evans who co-wrote and produced on the majority of Something About Faith, consulted a variety of collaborators to work with her on the album, including duo Carvin & Ivan, Chucky Thompson, Mike City, and Salaam Remi, as well as singer Keyshia Cole, and rappers Redman, Snoop Dogg and Raekwon.

The album earned a generally mixed reception from music critics, many of whom found it pleasant but a departure from the value of previous album The First Lady (2005), citing it as too ordinary, non-controversial and unassuming. Upon its release, Something About Faith debuted at number fifteen on the US Billboard 200 and topped the Independent Albums chart. By August 2012, it had sold 77,000 copies in the United States. The album's first single, "Gone Already", was released in August 2010 and peaked at number 26 on the US Billboard Hot R&B/Hip-Hop Songs chart. The song was nominated for Best Female R&B Vocal Performance for the 2011 Grammy Awards.

== Background ==
In 2001, Evans released her third studio album Faithfully with Bad Boy Records. While it became a success in the United States, Evans felt that the album had received "minimum support" from the label executives and founder Sean "P. Diddy" Combs as Bad Boy transitioned from distributor Arista Records to Universal Music, resulting into the negligence of several Bad Boy releases that year. Citing her wish to move on to be able to work with a new team, Evans asked and received a release from her contract and signed with Capitol Records on which she released the number-one album The First Lady and the Christmas album A Faithful Christmas in 2005. Still signed with Capitol, internal changes at the label and her fourth pregnancy forced Evans into a five-year break and the launch of other pursuits, including the writing and release of her 2008 autobiography Keep the Faith on Grand Central Publishing. Frustrated with her situation, Evans waited until she got a release from Capitol to acquire own imprint Prolific Music Group through E1 Music under which she began work on her next project.

== Recording ==
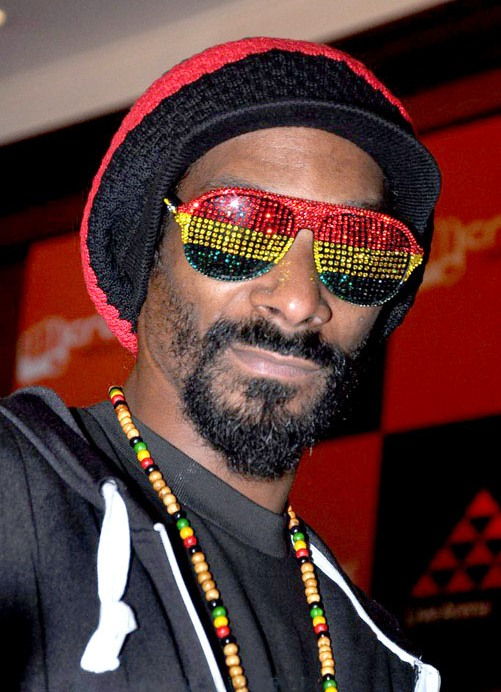
Snoop Dogg (pictured) suggested Evans to work on her next album after meeting at the taping of "We Are the World 25 for Haiti."

While she had co-written most of her catalogue and co-produced on several occasions, Evans envisioned herself to be "in the driver’s seat 100% and making for a great, more personal touch with the creative process" of Something About Faith. The singer and husband Todd Russaw took a "very hands on" approach during the making of the album, while using their relationships in calling different songwriters and producers to work with Evans on new songs. Several longtime contributors answered their request, including Chucky Thompson, Gil Smith II, duo Carvin & Ivan and co-producer Johnnie "Smurf" Smith who joined an eclectic group of noted but new collbaborators, including Salaam Remi, Mike City, and Malik Pendleton, among others. Musically, Evans was looking for a familiar sound for the album. In an interview with Blues & Soul magazine, she said: "I like to describe this album as the new adventures of the old Faith. Because to be honest – though my voice has matured and gotten stronger, to where it has much more depth to it these days – I really just wanted to deliver what it is that the true Faith Evans fans out there wanna hear from me. Which is my style of arrangements, my style of stacking harmonies."

Her most feature-heavy album up to then, Evans asked singer Keyshia Cole and rapper Raekwon to appear on her album when they wanted her to sing on their projects, prompting Evans to suggest an even swap after recording. She also reached out to rapper Snoop Dogg after meeting him at the taping of "We Are the World 25 for Haiti" in February 2010. Evans later commented on the process that "it was just a good vibe and a personal touch, the fact that it’s like wow, I’m really calling to see if I could clear this sample, and of course I’m ultimately letting my team handle it. But when you do things yourself, it might happen a little faster [...] it just kinda came together the way that I envisioned it, but not having done this before in this way, I didn’t know it would be, but it’s exactly how I wanted it to be." When asked what prompted her to title the album Something About Faith, again using her given name after Faith (1995), Keep the Faith (1998), Faithfully (2001) and A Faithful Christmas (2005), Evans further remarked: "I thought I ran out of ways to use my name in the title. The way this project came together [...] everyone was saying 'dag, they love you.' Everyone around me was saying, 'there’s something about you,' hence Something About Faith. It just came out of thin air [...] For this album I’m giving them the new adventures of the same old Faith, that’s how I like to describe it."

== Promotion ==
Something About Faith was preceded by the buzz single "Way You Move" featuring Snoop Dogg which was released on June 29, 2010. It reached number 65 on the Japan Hot 100, but failed to chart in the United States. It was followed by lead single "Gone Already." The song was released on August 10, 2010. It received a warm reception from critics – one of whom listed the "Toni Braxton-worthy breakup ballad" as one of the "standouts" on Something About Faith. Promoted by live performances on The Wendy Williams Show on October 8, 2010, and The Mo'Nique Show on November 12, 2010, "Gone Already" spent seventeen weeks on the US Billboard Hot R&B/Hip-Hop Songs chart where it peaked at number 26. The song was also promoted with the release of a music video on Evans' and E1 Music's official YouTube channels. In further promotion of the album, a high definition music video for "Right Here" was released on Evans' official YouTube account on February 14, 2011.

== Critical reception ==
Professional ratings
Review scores
Source	Rating
About.com	3/5 stars
AllMusic	2.5/5 stars
The Arizona Republic	3.5/5 stars
Billboard	3.5/5 stars
Mojo	3/5 stars
The New Zealand Herald	3/5 stars

Something About Faith received generally mixed to positive reviews from most music critics. SoulTracks editor Melody Charles found that the album reward Evans's "fans for their loyalty with some of her most confident and compelling music yet [...] For those who need a reminder, or for the fans who've felt bereft of her vocal renderings since The First Lady, [...] Evans' fifth CD marks a welcome return and offers that special 'something' you've been waiting for." Ed Masley from The Arizona Republic stated that "there's a lot to like" and went on to praise her "honeyed vocals" on "The Way You Move", but despite feeling that "the better songs could definitely hold their own on any future greatest hits collection" he went on to note that "like a lot of R&B releases, it may be a bit on the top-heavy side". Paula Yeoman, writing for The New Zealand Herald, noted that Evans "remains a slick, soulful vocalist, which makes Something About Faith an enjoyable, laid-back listen."

On the contrary Mark Edward Nero of About.com described the album as being "ordinary, non-controversial and unassuming" and felt that Evans' voice had been "toned down" and "harnessed so much that there's very few thickly passionate or dramatic moments [...] and some songs have such an overproduced feel to them that Faith's essence gets lost in the mix" despite noting that "at her best, she's a compelling, top-tier vocalist whose luscious voice has the power to mesmerize." Likewise, Melanie Sims of The Canadian Press described the album as being a "batch of soulful yet predictable ballads." However, Sims praised the "elegant sound" of "Gone Already", the "super smooth "Right Here" and bedtime ballad "Baby Lay", before going on to state that "Troubled World" is "the only track that manages to show the true depth and richness of the voice that has gotten Evans this far". AllMusic editor Andy Kellman described the album as "pleasant" but "merely decent" and stated that it "does not pack the lasting value boasted by Evans' most recent work." Similarly, Natalie Shaw from BBC Music wrote that "if the gloss is intended as escapism, it doesn’t sound like she is having much fun. And at 16 tracks, Something About Faith is exceedingly filler-heavy."

== Commercial performance ==
Something About Faith debuted at number fifteen on the US Billboard 200, number four on the Billboard Top R&B/Hip-Hop Albums chart and at number one on the Billboard Independent Albums with first-week sales of 23,586 copies. By August 2012, the album had sold 77,000 copies in the United States, according to Nielsen SoundScan. Elsewhere, Something About Faith failed to chart.

== Track listing ==
Something About Faith track listing
No.	Title	Writer(s)	Producer(s)	Length
1.	"Something About Faith" (Intro)	Faith Evans; Kye Russaw	Russaw; Evans	2:41
2.	"I Still"	Evans; Kyle Stewart; Ebony Carr-Baskin	KayTwo; Evans	4:10
3.	"Way You Move" (featuring Snoop Dogg)	Evans; Chucky Thompson; Janeal Ferguson; Don Lee Samuels; Keonte Vincent; Calvin Broadus	Thompson; Evans	4:55
4.	"Real Things"	Malik Pendleton	Pendleton	3:02
5.	"Worth It"	Evans; Thompson; Ferguson; Samuels	Thompson; Evans	3:39
6.	"Gone Already"	Evans; Carvin Haggins; Ivan Barias; Ryan Toby; Corey Williams; Johnathan Smith	Carvin & Ivan; J. Smith^{[A]}	3:53
7.	"Party" (featuring Redman)	Evans; Míchael Flowers; Ben Briggs III; Toni Coleman; Ebony Brown; Reginald Noble	Mike City; Evans	3:37
8.	"Right Here"	Evans; Russaw; Ferguson; Coleman	Russaw; Evans	3:07
9.	"Your Lover"	Evans; Thompson; Ferguson; Samuels	Thompson; Brad Todd^{[A]}	3:10
10.	"Can't Stay Away" (featuring Keyshia Cole)	Evans; Ibrahim "Ibe" Soliman; B. Briggs; Coleman; Cole	Ibe; Evans	3:20
11.	"Sunshine"	Evans; Flowers; Samuels; B. Briggs	City; Evans	3:33
12.	"Everyday Struggle" (featuring Raekwon)	Evans; Harvey Mason, Jr.; B. Briggs; Samuels; Coleman; Brown; Corey Woods	Evans; Todd; Carvin & Ivan^{[B]}; Gil Smith II^{[A]}	4:31
13.	"The Love in Me"	Evans; Salaam Remi; B. Briggs; Samuels; Coleman; Ericka Watson; Rufus Moore	Remi; Evans	3:36
14.	"Change"	Anthony Bell; Darrell Robinson	Bell; Robinson	3:44
15.	"Troubled World" (featuring Kelly Price & Jessica Reedy)	Evans; Thompson; Richard Gross; DJ Rogers, Jr	Thompson; Evans; Todd^{[A]}; B. Briggs^{[A]}	3:53
16.	"Baby Lay"	Evans; Patrick Briggs; B. Briggs	P. Briggs; B. Briggs; Evans	3:51
Total length:				58:38

Best Buy bonus track
No.	Title	Writer(s)	Producer(s)	Length
17.	"Troubled World (Part 2)" (featuring Estelle & Lil' Mo)	Evans; Thompson; Cynthia Loving; Estelle Swaray	Thompson; Evans; Todd^{[A]}	4:32

Notes

- ^{^[A]} denotes additional producer
- ^{^[B]} denotes co-producer

Sample credits

- "Everyday Struggle" embodies interpolation of "Either Way" as written by Harvey Mason Jr.
- "The Love in Me" includes a sample of "Easter Clothes" as written by Salaam Remi.

== Personnel ==
- Bert Padell, Trevor Baptiste – Management
- Alejandro Barajas – Mixing Assistant
- Ivan "Orthodox" Barias – Engineer, Instrumentation, Producer
- Joe Basurto – Design Consultant
- Darrell Robinson, Carvin "Ransum" Haggins, Anthony Bell – Producer
- Charlie Bereal – Guitar, Guitar Overdubs
- Kristene Bernard – Make-Up
- Derek Blanks – Photography
- Ben Briggs III – Additional Production, Associate Executive Producer, Drums, Engineer, Mixing, Producer, Programming
- Patrick "Devinaire" Briggs – Keyboards, Producer
- Tyler Nicolo, Daniel Laporte, Joe the Butcher, Carvin Haggins, Gleyder "Gee" Disla, Shon Brooks – Engineer
- "You Can Ask" Giz, Bob Horn, Eric "Ebo" Butler – Mixing
- Corey Latif, Ebony Carr-Baskin – backing vocals
- Mike City – Instrumentation, Producer
- Jeffry Rameau, Patrick Hewlett, Brandon Henderson, George Gumbs, Gerald Deus, Fabian Cooke, A.J. Clarke – Assistant Engineer
- Don Lee Samuels, D.J. Rogers Jr., Kirk Moore, Richard Glass, Toni Coleman, Danny Coakley, Alex Clarke – Vocals
- Brian Culberston – Fender Rhodes, Piano, Synthesizer
- Laurel Dann – A&R
- Marleny Dominguez – Label Direction
- Thomas Drayton – bass guitar
- Faith Evans – A&R, Executive Producer, Producer, Vocal Arrangement, Vocals (Background)
- Kenny Olsen, Chuck Gibson – Guitar
- Paul Grosso – Creative Director, Design
- Bernie Grundman – Mastering
- Dae Dae Haddon – Drums
- IBE – Engineer, Instrumentation, Producer
- Eric Ingram – Dubs, Guitar (Bass)
- Derek Lafayette – Marketing
- Bianca Lewis – Grooming
- Lex Lipsitz – Percussion
- Arnold Mischkulnig – Mastering, Mixing
- Bishop Moore – Consultant
- Malik Pendleton – Instrumentation, Mixing, Producer
- Darrell Miller, Fox Rothschild, Julian Petty – Legal Advisor
- Shanell Red – Vocal Arrangement
- Salaam Remi – Arranger, Bass, Drums, Guitar, Producer
- Kye Russaw – Assistant Engineer, Engineer, Instrumentation, Producer
- Todd Russaw – A&R, Executive Producer, Management
- Gil Smith II – Additional Production
- Johnnie "Smurf" Smith – Additional Production, Keyboards
- Dee "Pitboss" Sonaram – A&R, Promoter
- Staybent Krunk A-Delic – Programming
- Kyle Stewart – Engineer, Instrumentation, Producer
- Shadow Stokes – Promoter
- Chucky Thompson – Instrumentation, Moog Synthesizer, Producer
- Brad Todd – Additional Production, Engineer, Executive Producer, Mixing, Producer
- Mickel Valere – Guitar (Acoustic)
- Keonte Vincent – Engineer, Vocals (Background)

== Charts ==
Chart performance for Something About Faith
Chart (2010)	Peak position
US Billboard 200	15
US Independent Albums (Billboard)	1
US Top R&B/Hip-Hop Albums (Billboard)	4

== Release history ==
Something About Faith release history
Region	Date	Formats	Label	Ref.
United States	October 5, 2010	CD; digital download	Prolific; E1	
United Kingdom	December 6, 2010	CD; digital download	Prolific; E1	
