= Lay with You =

2010 single by El Debarge featuring Faith Evans

Single by El Debarge featuring Faith Evans

from the album Second Chance
- Released: October 25, 2010
- Genre: R&B
- Length: 3:41
- Label: Geffen
- Songwriters: E.J. Coulter; Michael Flowers
- Producer: Michael "Mike City" Flowers

El DeBarge singles chronology
"Second Chance" (2010)	"Lay with You" (2010)	"Good Time" (2010)

Faith Evans singles chronology
"Gone Already" (2010)	"Lay with You" (2010)	"Believe It" (2011)

"Lay with You" is the second single by American R&B singer El DeBarge, featuring R&B singer Faith Evans, from his fifth studio album, Second Chance (2010). The single was released on October 25, 2010, by Geffen Records. It was written by E.J. Coulter and Michael Flowers and produced by Michael "Mike City" Flowers. The music video was released on November 8, 2010 on El DeBarge's VEVO account.

== Chart performance ==
On March 12, 2011, the song reached its peak at number two on the Adult R&B Songs chart in its seventeenth week, and number 80 on the Hot 100 Airplay chart. On February 19, the song reached its peak at number nineteen on the R&B/Hip-Hop Airplay chart in its fourteenth week and number twenty on the Hot R&B/Hip-Hop Songs chart in its fifteenth week.

== Charts ==
=== Weekly charts ===
Chart (2010–2011)	Peak position
South Korea International (Circle)	37
US Bubbling Under Hot 100 (Billboard)	12
US Adult R&B Songs (Billboard)	2
US Hot R&B/Hip-Hop Songs (Billboard)	20

=== Year-end charts ===
Chart (2011)	Position
US Hot R&B/Hip-Hop Songs (Billboard)	57
