= Soon as I Get Home =

Single by Faith Evans

from the album Faith
- Released: 1995
- Length: 5:24
- Label: Bad Boy; Arista
- Songwriters: Faith Evans; Sean Combs; Chucky Thompson
- Producers: Sean Combs; Chucky Thompson

Faith Evans singles chronology
"You Used to Love Me" (1995)	"Soon as I Get Home" (1995)	"Ain't Nobody" (1995)

Music video
- "Soon as I Get Home" on YouTube

"Soon as I Get Home" is a song by the American singer Faith Evans. It was written by Evans along with Sean Combs and Chucky Thompson for her debut studio album, Faith (1995), while production was helmed by Combs and Thompson. A romantic hip hop soul ballad which chronicles a woman's desire to spend more time with her loved one, it was inspired by Evans' marriage to her then-husband The Notorious B.I.G., which had changed radically after the major commercial success of his debut album Ready to Die (1994).

The song was released as the album's second single following "You Used to Love Me" (1995). It peaked at numbers 11 and 21 on the US Cash Box Top 100 and Billboard Hot 100 charts, and number three on the US Hot R&B/Hip-Hop Songs chart, becoming Faith's highest-charting single. In February 1996, "Soon as I Get Home" was certified gold by the Recording Industry Association of America (RIAA). The same year, it won Evans the Lady of Soul Award for Best R&B/Soul or Rap New Artist at the 2nd awards ceremony.

== Background ==
"Soon as I Get Home" was written by Evans, Sean Combs and Chucky Thompson and produced by Combs and Thompson for her debut studio album Faith (1995). The song was done to pass the time at the studio because Thompson had a flight to catch later that day. As he was about to leave, he received a call from Combs insisting he record the music Evans heard him play before he got on the plane. Evans later left a message on Thompson's answering machine – which was the song she wrote and recorded. Thompson said the song was finished and he didn't add any other touches to it.

In her 2008 autobiography Keep the Faith, Evans acknowledged that while most material on her debut album were written to describe her feelings for then-husband The Notorious B.I.G., she wrote "Soon as I Get Home" with lines that she wished he would sing to her after he was spending more and more time traveling. In 2011, Evans ranked the song among her ten favorite recording, telling Youknowigotsoul: "I’ve heard many people say this song is a timeless love song. It’s one of my faves from my first album, and I love the energy the audience gives me every time I perform it live."

== Critical reception ==
In his review for Billboard magazine, editor Larry Flick noted that "Evans will have no trouble affirming her status as the next queen of hip-hop/soul with this gloriously romantic slow jam. The chorus lingers in the mind long after the song has faded, and Evans' vocals demand comparison to the early work of Gladys Knight and Mary Wells. Producer Chucky Thompson ties all these lovely threads together into a cohesive piece that will win the hearts of top 40, R&B, and even AC radio programmers." In September 1996, "Soon as I Get Home" won Evans the Lady of Soul Award for Best R&B/Soul or Rap New Artist.

== Commercial performance ==
On the week of December 9, 1995, "Soon as I Get Home" debuted at numbers seven and 40 on both the Billboard Hot R&B/Hip-Hop Songs and Hot 100 charts respectively. It reached number 21 on the Hot 100 the week of January 6, 1996, staying on the chart for 20 weeks. The song peaked at number three on the Hot R&B/Hip-Hop Songs chart the week of February 10, remaining there for 22 weeks. Four days later, it was certified gold by the RIAA.

== Music video ==
The music video for "Soon as I Get Home" was directed by Marcus Raboy.

== Track listings ==
US CD single
No.	Title	Writer(s)	Producer(s)	Length
1.	"Soon as I Get Home" (radio edit)	Faith Evans; Sean Combs; Chucky Thompson	Combs; Thompson	4:16
2.	"Soon as I Get Home" (album version)	Evans; Combs; Thompson	Combs; Thompson	5:24
3.	"Soon as I Get Home" (instrumental)	Evans; Combs; Thompson	Combs; Thompson	5:29
4.	"No Other Love" (album version)	Evans	Combs	5:29
5.	"You Used to Love Me" (Puff Daddy mix)	Evans	Combs	4:33

US CD Remix single
No.	Title	Writer(s)	Producer(s)	Length
1.	"Soon as I Get Home" (album version)	Evans; Combs; Thompson	Combs; Thompson	5:24
2.	"Soon as I Get Home" (remix featuring Aaron Hall)	Evans; Combs; Thompson; Hall; Stevie J	Combs; Thompson	4:59
3.	"Soon as I Get Home" (instrumental)	Evans; Combs; Thompson	Combs; Thompson	5:29

Sample credits

- "You Used to Love Me (Puff Daddy mix)" contains a sample from "Are You a Customer" by EPMD.

== Credits and personnel ==
Credits adapted from the liner notes of Faith.

- Bob Brockman – recording engineer
- Sean Combs – mixing engineer, producer
- Faith Evans – vocal arranger, vocalist, writer
- Tony Maserati – engineer
- Darryl McCleary – additional keyboards
- Jon Shriver – second engineer
- Chucky Thompson – producer

== Charts ==
=== Weekly charts ===
Weekly chart performance for "Soon as I Get Home"
Chart (1995–1996)	Peak position
US Billboard Hot 100	21
US Hot R&B/Hip-Hop Songs (Billboard)	3
US Maxi-Singles Sales (Billboard)	4
US Cash Box Top 100	11

=== Year-end charts ===
Year-end chart performance for "Soon as I Get Home"
Chart (1996)	Position
US Billboard Hot 100	97
US Hot R&B/Hip-Hop Songs (Billboard)	21

== Certifications ==
Certifications for "Soon as I Get Home"
Region	Certification	Certified units/sales
United States (RIAA)	Gold	500,000^{^}
^{^} Shipments figures based on certification alone.
