= A Faithful Christmas =

Studio album by Faith Evans
- Released: October 25, 2005
- Genre: Christmas; R&B
- Length: 40:04
- Label: Capitol
- Producer: Todd Russaw; PJ Morton; Kowan "Q" Paul; Gil Smith II; Tim Stewart

Faith Evans chronology
The First Lady (2005)	A Faithful Christmas (2005)	Something About Faith (2010)

A Faithful Christmas is a Christmas album and the fifth studio album by American recording artist Faith Evans, released on October 25, 2005, by Capitol Records. Work on the album began in mid-2005 after the release of her fourth studio album The First Lady. A collection of holiday songs, it contains standards such as "White Christmas" and "Santa Baby" alongside two new compositions, "Happy Holiday" and "Christmas Wish", both of which were written by Evans and her daughter Chyna Griffin. Todd Russaw (Evans ex-husband) was a music producer on every song on the album.

== Reception ==
Professional ratings
Review scores
Source	Rating
Allmusic	2.5/5 stars
Entertainment Weekly	B−
People	2.5/4 stars

The album received generally mixed reviews from critics. In his review for Allmusic, Andy Kellman from wrote that the album sounded "very uneven and hastily thrown together." He criticized A Faithful Christmas for switching between "thoroughly modern" and classic Christmas songs, calling Evans's original material on the album "spirited but bland." He however praised her "straightforward version" of "The Day That Love Began." Chris Willman from Entertainment Weekly found that "some of her beat-heavy originals are Faith-based fun [but] misses include an old James Brown Xmas tune with way more 'Good Gods!' than any non-Godfather should attempt." People magazine writer Chuck Arnold felt that "the girliness of "Santa Baby" and playfulness of Frank Sinatra's "Mistletoe and Holly" don't suit [Evans]. More fittingly, the CD closes with "O Come All Ye Faithful."

== Track listing ==
The First Lady track listing
No.	Title	Writer(s)	Producer(s)	Length
1.	"Happy Holiday"	Faith Evans; Chyna T. Griffin	Todd Russaw; Kowan "Q" Paul; Gil Smith II	5:19
2.	"The Day That Love Began"	Ron Miller; Deborah Wells	Russaw; PJ Morton	3:26
3.	"Soulful Christmas"	James Brown; Alfred Ellis; Hank Ballard	Russaw; Paul; Smith	3:06
4.	"Santa Baby"	Joan Javits; Philip Springer; Tony Springer	Russaw; Paul; Smith; Tim Stewart	3:19
5.	"Merry Christmas Baby"	Lou Baxter; Johnny Moore	Russaw; Paul; Stewart	4:33
6.	"Mistletoe and Holly"	Frank Sinatra; Dok Stanford; Hank Sanicola	Russaw; Paul	2:16
7.	"Christmas Wish"	Evans; Griffin; Lou Baxter; Johnny Dudley Moore; Toni Coleman	Russaw; Paul	3:31
8.	"Christmas Song"	Robert Wells; Mel Tormé	Russaw; Paul; Smith; Stewart	3:35
9.	"This Christmas"	Nadine McKinnor; Donny Pitts	Russaw; Paul	3:51
10.	"White Christmas"	Irving Berlin	Russaw; Paul; Smith	3:26
11.	"O Come, All ye Faithful"	John Francis Wade	Russaw; Paul; Smith	3:37
Total length:				40:04

Sample credits

- "Soulful Christmas" contains a sample of the recording "Soulful Christmas" as performed by James Brown.
- "Christmas Wish" samples from "Merry Christmas Baby" as performed by James Brown.

== Charts ==
Chart performance for A Faithful Christmas
Chart (2005)	Peak position
US Top R&B/Hip-Hop Albums (Billboard)	70
US Top Holiday Albums (Billboard)	7
