= You Used to Love Me =

1995 single by Faith Evans

Single by Faith Evans

from the album Faith
- Released: July 13, 1995
- Studio: The Hit Factory (New York City)
- Length: 4:28
- Label: Bad Boy, Arista
- Songwriter: Faith Evans
- Producers: Sean Combs, Chucky Thompson

Faith Evans singles chronology
"One More Chance" (1995)	"You Used to Love Me" (1995)	"Soon as I Get Home" (1995)

Music video
- "You Used to Love Me" on YouTube

"You Used to Love Me" is the debut single of American singer-songwriter Faith Evans. Written by Evans and produced by Sean "Diddy" Combs and Chucky Thompson for her debut album, Faith (1995), the song was initially intended to be used on fellow Bad Boy Records signees Total's self-titled first album (1996), but was eventually claimed by Evans after she had found lyrics to Thompson's track which were inspired by another argument the singer had with then-husband the Notorious B.I.G..

Released as a single in June 1995, "You Used to Love Me" earned largely positive reviews. It peaked at numbers 17 and 24 on the US Cash Box Top 100 and Billboard Hot 100 charts, and reached the top five on the Hot R&B/Hip-Hop Songs chart. In August 1995, the song was certified Gold by the Recording Industry Association of America (RIAA). In 2009, the song was included in the biopic Notorious (2009). On Christmas Day 2015, Evans released a re-recorded version of the song on Faith 20, a six-track album composed of remakes from Faith.

== Background ==
"You Used to Love Me" was written by Evans and produced by Combs and Thompson for her debut studio album Faith (1995). The song was originally planned for her labelmates Total, but Evans wrote to the track after hearing the music and it was the first song finished for her album. Commenting on the creation process, Thompson told Soul Culture in 2014: "I met [Total] and I knew they had this swag about them. We were digging in the record crates for ’70s music back then. I went into the studio and zoned out. I picked up a guitar and starting messing around with it to see what I could come up with. I gave the tape to [Combs] and I never heard back from him. One day, I hear Faith putting down some ideas in the studio. She had three or four different hooks for this song. This one hook she had was crazy because it sounded off. She sounded real lazy with it and it ended up being the hook we went with for the song."

Evans further elaborated in her 2008 autobiography Keep the Faith: "It was the kind of love song that I knew any woman could relate to. But it was also a song that men would bump in their cars because the beat was crazy and my voice was more smoky than saccharine-sweet. I also knew that it perfectly fit what Puff was going for in terms of being sexy and mature. It was the kind of song I knew that people my mom's age would like just as much as young people." According to Evans, Bad Boy Records instantly decided that "You Used to Love Me" would be the first single from Faith.

== Critical reception ==
Billboard magazine editor Larry Flick found that on "You Used to Love Me" Evans "carves out her own niche by keeping her vocal flow easy and decidedly more jazzy — a stylistic choice that works well with this jam's plush, old-school R&B sound. The crowning element is a ticking jeep beat that crawls up the spine without overpowering the subtlety of Faith's performance or the song's hook." Flick's colleague Paul Verna called the song a "loopy debut." In a retrospective review, Demi Phillips from HotNewHipHop wrote in 2023: "A brilliant introduction to the plethora of R&B hits she would release, Faith Evans showed off her storytelling capabilities with the song. On the track, she delivered a heartbreaking and honest note about her feelings. Evans reminisced about how a former love used to cherish her but didn’t anymore."

== Commercial performance ==
On the week of July 1, 1995, "You Used to Love Me" debuted at numbers 16 and 46 on both the Billboard Hot R&B/Hip-Hop Songs and Hot 100 charts respectively. It reached number 24 on the Hot 100 the week of August 19, staying on the chart for 20 weeks. The following week, the track peaked at number four on the Hot R&B/Hip-Hop Songs chart, remaining there for 26 weeks. It was certified gold by the RIAA on August 23. For the week ending October 8, the track debuted and peaked at number 42 on the UK Singles Chart. It dropped to number 67 the following week before leaving the chart completely.

== Music video ==
Director Lionel C. Martin was consulted to film two music videos for "You Used to Love Me." The "Biggie Version" of "You Used to Love Me" co-stars The Notorious B.I.G..

== Track listings ==
All tracks written by Faith Evans.

US CD single
No.	Title	Producer(s)	Length
1.	"You Used to Love Me" (album version)	Combs; Thompson	4:28
2.	"You Used to Love Me" (Club I mix)	Combs; Thompson	4:15
3.	"You Used to Love Me" (Club II mix)	Combs; Thompson	5:08

UK maxi-CD single
No.	Title	Producer(s)	Length
1.	"You Used to Love Me" (album version)	Combs; Thompson	4:28
2.	"You Used to Love Me" (Ali mix)	Combs; Thompson; Ali Shaheed Muhammad^{[a]}	4:28
3.	"You Used to Love Me" (Puff Daddy mix)	Combs	4:33
4.	"You Used to Love Me" (Club I mix)	Combs; Thompson	4:15

Notes

- ^{^[a]} signifies remix producer(s)

Sample credits

- "You Used to Love Me (Puff Daddy mix)" contains a sample from "Are You a Customer" by EPMD.

== Credits and personnel ==
Credits adapted from the liner notes of Faith.

- Sean Combs – mixing engineer, producer
- Lane Craven – recording engineer
- Faith Evans – vocalist, writer
- Tony Maserati – engineer
- Jon Shriver – second engineer
- Chucky Thompson – producer

== Charts ==
=== Weekly charts ===
Weekly chart performance for "You Used to Love Me"
Chart (1995)	Peak position
UK Singles (Official Charts)	42
UK Hip Hop/R&B (Official Charts)	9
US Billboard Hot 100	24
US Hot R&B/Hip-Hop Songs (Billboard)	4
US Rhythmic Airplay (Billboard)	31
US Cash Box Top 100	17

=== Year-end charts ===
Year-end chart performance for "You Used to Love Me"
Chart (1995)	Position
US Billboard Hot 100	79
US Hot R&B/Hip-Hop Songs (Billboard)	25

== Certifications ==
Certifications for "You Used to Love Me"
Region	Certification	Certified units/sales
United States (RIAA)	Gold	500,000^{^}
^{^} Shipments figures based on certification alone.

== Release history ==
"You Used to Love Me" release history
Region	Date	Format(s)	Label(s)	Ref.
United States	June 1995	12-inch vinyl; CD; cassette	Bad Boy	
United Kingdom	October 2, 1995	12-inch vinyl; CD; cassette	Arista; Puff Daddy	
