= Gone Already =

Single by Faith Evans

from the album Something About Faith
- Released: August 10, 2010
- Genre: R&B
- Length: 3:53
- Label: Prolific; E1
- Songwriters: Ivan Barias; Faith Evans; Carvin Haggins; Johnathan Smith; Ryan Toby; Corey "Latif" Williams
- Producer: Carvin & Ivan

Faith Evans singles chronology
"Way You Move" (2010)	"Gone Already" (2010)	"Lay with You" (2010)

"Gone Already" is a song by American recording artist Faith Evans. It was written by Evans, Ryan Toby, Corey "Latif" Williams, Johnathan Smith, Carvin Haggins, and Ivan Barias for her sixth studio album, Something About Faith (2010), while production helmed by Haggins and Barias under their production moniker Carvin & Ivan. Smith is credited as an additional producer on the piano-led R&B ballad, on which Evans sings about letting go of past pain and moving forward into a brighter future.

The song was released for digital download on August 10, 2010, serving as the lead single from Something About Faith. Evans's first solo release in five years, it managed to peak at number 26 on the US Hot R&B/Hip-Hop Songs chart but failed to enter the Billboard Hot 100. "Gone Already" was nominated for Best Female R&B Vocal Performance for the 2011 Grammy Awards. Evans performed the song live on The Wendy Williams Show on October 8, 2010 and on The Mo'Nique Show on November 12, 2010.

== Background ==
"Gone Already" written by Evans along with Ryan Toby, Corey "Latif" Williams, Johnathan Smith, Carvin Haggins, and Ivan Barias for her sixth studio album, Something About Faith (2010). Production was overseen by Haggins and Barias who are credited under their production moniker Carvin & Ivan, while Smith served as additional producer on the song. Lyrically, the anthemic R&B ballad finds the protganoist walking away from an unhealthy relationship.

== Critical reception ==
Described as a "Toni Braxton-worthy breakup ballad" by Andy Kellman of Allmusic, "Gone Already" has received positive critical reception, being cited as one of the "standouts" on Something About Faith. Associated Press writer Melanie Sims found that "Evans reveals a more elegant sound with" the song, "showcasing her slightly trembling vocals over piano and a subdued bass line." The New Zealand Herald critic Paula Yeoman found that the song was "close" to the "spark and the passion so evident in Evans' earlier work." At the 2011 Grammy Awards, "Gone Already" was nominated for Best Female R&B Vocal Performance but lost to Fantasia Barrino's "Bittersweet" (2010).

== Chart performance ==
"Gone Already" peaked at number twenty-six on the US Billboard Hot R&B/Hip-Hop Songs chart in the week of December 11, 2010, spending a total of seventeen weeks on the chart. It also spent 25 weeks on Billboard's Adult R&B Songs chart, eventually peaking at number six on November 27, 2010. It was ranked 31st on the Adult R&B Songs chart's year-end ranking.

== Music video ==
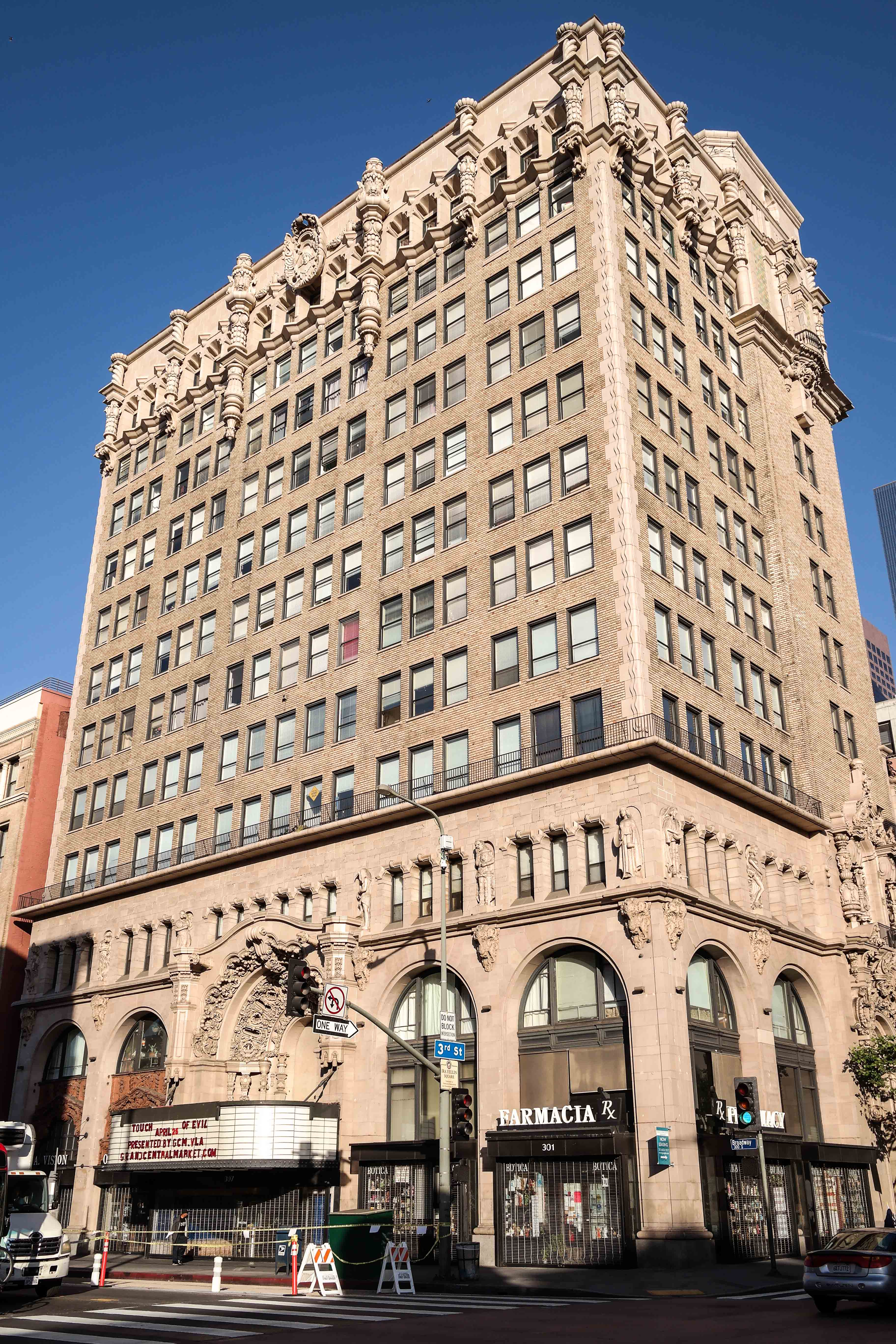
The music video for "Gone Already" was filmed in the Million Dollar Theater in Downtown Los Angeles.

A music video for "Gone Already" was directed by Dion Watkins and filmed at the Million Dollar Theater in Downtown Los Angeles in the week of August 21, 2010. Jonathan Hall was consulted as the album's cinematographer. The visuals feature several mime artists. During the weekend of the video shoot, Evans was arrested on August 21 at a checkpoint near Marina del Rey.

== Credits and personnel ==
- Ivan Barias – producer, writer
- Faith Evans – vocalist, writer
- Carvin Haggins – producer, writer
- Johnathan Smith – additional producer, writer
- Ryan Toby – writer
- Corey "Latif" Williams – writer

== Charts ==
=== Weekly charts ===
Weekly chart performance for "Gone Already"
Chart (2010)	Peak position
US Adult R&B Songs (Billboard)	6
US Hot R&B/Hip-Hop Songs (Billboard)	26

=== Year-end charts ===
Year-end chart performance for "Gone Already"
Chart (2010)	Position
US Adult R&B Songs (Billboard)	31

== Release history ==
"Gone Already" release history
Region	Date	Format(s)	Label	Ref.
United States	August 10, 2010	Digital download; streaming	Prolific; E1	
