= Faith (Faith Evans album) =

Studio album by Faith Evans
- Released: August 29, 1995
- Recorded: November 1994–June 1995
- Studio: The Hit Factory (New York City)
- Genre: R&B
- Length: 62:10
- Label: Bad Boy; Arista
- Producer: Sean Combs; Prince Charles Alexander; Mark Ledford; Herb Middleton; Jean-Claude Olivier; Timothy Riley; Chucky Thompson

Faith Evans chronology
Faith (1995)	Keep the Faith (1998)

Singles from Faith
- 1. "You Used to Love Me" Released: July 13, 1995; 2. "Soon as I Get Home" Released: September 21, 1995; 3. "Ain't Nobody" Released: October 26, 1995; 4. "Come Over" Released: January 24, 1996

Faith is the debut studio album by American singer Faith Evans. It was released by Bad Boy Records on August 29, 1995, in the United States. A collaboration with the label's main producers the Hitmen, including members Sean "Puff Daddy" Combs and Chucky Thompson, as well as Mark Ledford, Herb Middleton, and Jean-Claude Olivier, among others.

The album, which spawned the gold-certified hits "You Used to Love Me" and "Soon as I Get Home," was certified Platinum by the RIAA in March 1996. Faith contains a cover of Rose Royce's single "Love Don't Live Here Anymore" which featured an appearance from Mary J. Blige on the album's original pressings.

== Production ==
Newly contracted to Bad Boy Records, Evans was consulted by executive producer Combs to contribute backing vocals and writing skills to Mary J. Blige's My Life (1994) and Usher's self-titled debut album (1994) before starting work on her debut record album Faith. Producer Chucky Thompson - who helmed most of the album - recalls meeting Evans for the first time by her doing vocal production work on Usher's album. Though she initially was a protégé of Al B. Sure!'s, she eventually signed to Bad Boy and insisted on Thompson producing her entire album after hearing him playing music on the piano in the studio. Thompson said Evans' first single "You Used To Love Me" was originally planned for her labelmates Total, but Evans wrote the track after hearing the music and it was the first song finished for her album. The second single "Soon As I Get Home" was done to pass the time at the studio because Thompson had a flight to catch later that day. As he was about to leave, he received a call from Combs insisting he record the music Evans heard him play before he got on the plane. Evans later left a message on Thompson's answering machine - which was the song she wrote and recorded. Thompson said the song was finished and he didn't add any other touches.

Another song on the album, "You Don't Understand", was primarily influenced by Evans' marriage to The Notorious B.I.G. The music of R. Kelly was the primary inspiration for the musical arrangement, according to Thompson. The third single from the album was the song "Ain't Nobody". Thompson said it was influenced by the song "Can't Let Her Get Away" by Michael Jackson from his 1991 album Dangerous. When he started on the music, he didn't do the tracking until after Combs came to hear the song and gave him the go-ahead to track it. When Thompson attempted the first time after Combs left, the plug came out from the machine, and the entire track was erased - which led him to do it all over again from scratch. The final single released from the album, "Come Over," was initially supposed to be an interlude. However, Evans insisted the interlude should be made into a full song. Another album track on Faith, "All This Love" was written by Evans and her boyfriend before her marriage to The Notorious B.I.G., but Thompson revealed the music was composed five years before he met Evans. The CD bonus track "Reasons" featured uncredited background vocals from Blackstreet member Dave Hollister. His appearance was due to Evans and Blackstreet recording their debut albums at the same studio but only on different floors. Also originally planned as an interlude, Blackstreet member and producer Teddy Riley came looking for Hollister and overheard the two singing "Reasons." Riley then suggested to Combs that it should be made into a full song. Faith was recorded primarily at The Hit Factory and Combs' studio Daddy's House Recording - both based in New York City.

== Critical reception ==
Professional ratings
Review scores
Source	Rating
AllMusic	3.5/5 stars
Entertainment Weekly	A−
The Rolling Stone Album Guide	3/5 stars

Faith received critical acclaim upon its release. Entertainment Weekly gave the album an A− rating, describing Faith as "packed with sensual, smoky R&B torch songs and titanium-hard hip-hop beats--Faith seems set to take her place at the top of the mountain of young soul divas." Vibe complimented the album's vocal production, noting that Evans "possesses a perfect voice. Folks have likened that voice to rain, and it's an appropriate metaphor [...] that sounds as lilting as a summer shower or as electric as a thunderstorm. Her instrument's potential seems boundless [...] more Whitney than Mary, more classic than nouveau." The Source praised Sean Combs' production, writing that "for those closet sentimentalists or those who like to get their slow drag on [...] when you're working with the man who perfected the remix, there's still a good chance that Faith will not only be pumping on rainy nights in the crib but also on summer days in the Land Cruisers too." AllMusic editor Stephen Thomas Erlewine remarked that Faith "proves that she is as powerful in the spotlight as she is behind the scenes. Evans builds on a basic, hip-hop-influenced funk, alternating between simmering grooves and sultry ballads. Faith does have a couple of dull spots, but the album is a first-class debut."

== Commercial performance ==
Released on August 29, 1995, Faith became a success based on its hit singles. The album debuted and peaked at number 22 on the US Billboard 200 in the week of September 16, 1995. The same week, it debuted at number five on the Top R&B/Hip-Hop Albums chart, before eventually peaking at number two on October 7, 1995. On October 31, 1995, the album was certified Gold by the Recording Industry Association of America (RIAA) and on March 19, 1996, it reached Platinum status in the United States, surpassing shipment figures of over 1.0 million copies. By October 1998, Faith had sold 801,000 copies domestically, according to Nielsen Soundscan.

== Track listing ==
Faith track listing
No.	Title	Writer(s)	Producer(s)	Length
1.	"Faith (Interlude)"	Faith Evans	Chucky Thompson	0:41
2.	"No Other Love"	Evans	Sean "Puffy" Combs	4:24
3.	"Fallin' in Love"	Evans; Mary J. Blige; LaTonya Blige; Gordon Chambers	Jean-Claude Olivier; Timothy Riley; Combs	4:33
4.	"Ain't Nobody"	Evans; Combs; Chucky Thompson	Combs; Thompson	5:13
5.	"You Are My Joy (Interlude)"	Evans	Thompson	1:08
6.	"Love Don't Live Here Anymore"	Miles Gregory	Prince Charles Alexander; Combs; Mark Ledford	4:15
7.	"Come Over"	Evans; Floyd Howard	Combs; Thompson	5:35
8.	"Soon as I Get Home"	Evans; Combs	Combs; Thompson	5:24
9.	"All This Love"	Evans	Combs; Thompson	6:02
10.	"Thank You Lord (Interlude)"	Evans	Evans	0:55
11.	"You Used to Love Me"	Evans	Combs; Thompson	4:28
12.	"Give It to Me"	Evans	Combs; Thompson	4:35
13.	"You Don't Understand"	Evans	Combs; Thompson	5:01
14.	"Don't Be Afraid"	Evans; LaTrice Shaw	Herb Middleton	4:55

CD-only bonus track
No.	Title	Writer(s)	Producer(s)	Length
15.	"Reasons"	Evans	Combs; Thompson	5:01
Total length:				62:10

Sample credits

- "No Other Love" contains a sample from "Walk On By", as written by Burt Bacharach and Hal David and performed by Isaac Hayes.
- "Fallin' in Love" contains a sample from "Remind Me", as written and performed by Patrice Rushen.
- "Give It to Me" samples "In the Mood", as written and performed by Tyrone Davis.

== Personnel ==
- Charles "Prince Charles" Alexander – mixing, producer, musician
- Victor Bailey – musician
- "Bassy" Bob Brockman – engineer
- Regina Carter – violin
- Sean "Puffy" Combs – producer, executive producer
- Lane Craven – engineer
- Akua Dixon – musician
- Faith Evans – vocals, songwriting
- Caroline Greyshock – photography
- Jeffrey Haynes – musician
- Judith Insell – musician
- Kevin Johnson – musician
- Daron Jones – keyboards, vocals
- Mark Ledford – producer, trumpet
- Paul Logus – engineer
- Gerardo Lopez – engineer
- Tony Maserati – engineer, mixing
- Darryl McClary – keyboards
- Fred McFarlane – keyboards
- Herb Middleton – keyboards, producer, additional keyboards
- Nasheim Myrick – engineer
- Axel Niehaus – engineer, mixing
- Quinnes Parker – backing vocals
- Paul Pesco – guitar
- Bruce Purse – trumpet
- John Shriver – engineer, second engineer
- Tony Smalios – engineer
- Lisa Terry – musician
- Kevin Thomas – engineer
- Chucky Thompson – producer
- Richard Travali – engineer, mixing
- Kiyah Wright – hair stylist
- Mary J. Blige – vocals

== Charts ==
=== Weekly charts ===
Weekly chart performance for Faith
Chart (1995)	Peak position
US Billboard 200	22
US Top R&B/Hip-Hop Albums (Billboard)	2

=== Year-end charts ===
1995 year-end chart performance for Faith
Chart (1995)	Position
US Billboard 200	190
US Top R&B/Hip-Hop Albums (Billboard)	42

1996 year-end chart performance for Faith
Chart (1996)	Position
US Top R&B/Hip-Hop Albums (Billboard)	39

== Certifications ==
Certifications for Faith
Region	Certification	Certified units/sales
United States (RIAA)	Platinum	1,000,000^{^}
^{^} Shipments figures based on certification alone.
