= Heart, Mind and Soul (El DeBarge album) =

Studio album by El DeBarge
- Released: May 16, 1994
- Recorded: 1993–1994
- Studios: Larrabee Sound Studios and Studio 89 (North Hollywood, California); Sunset Sound Recorders (Hollywood, California); Encore Studios and The Enterprise (Burbank, California); Krosswire Studio and Bosstown Recording Studios (Atlanta, Georgia); Electric Lady Studios, Easthill Recording Studios and Axis Studios (New York City, New York)
- Genres: R&B, soul
- Length: 50:08
- Label: Reprise Records
- Producers: Babyface El DeBarge Jermaine Dupri Tony Dofat

El DeBarge chronology
In The Storm (1992)	Heart, Mind and Soul (1994)	Ultimate Collection (2003)

Professional ratings
Review scores
Source	Rating
AllMusic	3/5 stars
The Encyclopedia of Popular Music	3/5 stars
The Village Voice	A−
Washington Post	(favourable)
Vibe	(favourable)
Baltimore Sun	(favourable)

Heart, Mind and Soul is the fourth album by American recording artist El DeBarge. It was released in 1994 on Reprise Records, and was produced by El DeBarge, Babyface, Tony Dofat and Jermaine Dupri.

The album contains the hit singles "Can't Get Enough," which peaked at #21 on the Billboard Hot R&B Singles chart, and "Where Is My Love," which peaked at #19.

== Critical reception ==
The Washington Post wrote that "the unwavering intensity of DeBarge's voice, even in the highest octaves, gives his claims of tender devotion a rare credibility." Vibe praised DeBarge's collaborations with Babyface, writing that "while Heart, Mind and Soul might not find a star fully reborn, most of its better tracks point to the inception of a promising partnership."

== Track listing ==
1. "Where You Are" (Babyface, El DeBarge) – 4:02
2. "Can't Get Enough" (Babyface, Jonathan Robinson) – 4:08
3. "Where Is My Love" (featuring Babyface) (Babyface, El DeBarge) – 5:38
4. "You Got The Love I Want" (Babyface, El DeBarge) – 4:44
5. "Its Got To Be Real" (Bruce Fisher, El DeBarge) – 3:58
6. "Slide" (El DeBarge, Winston Riley, Jermaine Dupri, Manuel Seal) – 5:43
7. "I'll Be There" (Babyface, El DeBarge) – 4:02
8. "Special Lady" (El DeBarge, Tony Dofat) – 4:08
9. "Starlight, Moonlight, Candlelight" (El DeBarge, Randy DeBarge, Janet Cole) – 3:46
10. "You Are My Dream" (El DeBarge, Bruce Fisher) – 5:15
11. "Heart, Mind and Soul" (El DeBarge) – 4:36

== Personnel ==
Musicians

- El DeBarge – lead vocals, keyboards (5, 9–11), bass (5, 9–11), drums (5, 10, 11), percussion (9, 11)
- Babyface – synthesizers (1–4, 7), drum programming (1–4, 7)
- Jonathan Robinson – synthesizers (2), drum programming (2)
- Tony Dofat – additional keyboards (5), keyboard programming (8), drum programming (8)
- W. Michael Lewis – synthesizer programming (5, 9–11), computer programming (5, 9–11), drums (9)
- Winston Phillips – keyboard bass (5)
- Jermaine Dupri – instruments (6)
- Manuel Seal – instruments (6)
- Jeff Lorber – keyboard overdubs (10)
- Tommy Organ – guitar (6)
- Ricardo Silveria – guitar (7)
- Nunzio Singore – guitar (8)
- Charles Fearing – guitar (9)
- Wah Wah Watson – guitar (11)
- Nathan East – bass (3, 7)
- Randy DeBarge – drums (9)
- Stevie Wonder – harmonica (1)
- Jerry Hey – trumpet solo (11)
- Paul Riser – strings (11)

Background and Guest vocalists

- El DeBarge – backing vocals (1–5, 7–11)
- Babyface – backing vocals (1–4, 7), lead vocals (3)
- Randy DeBarge – backing vocals (2, 5, 8–10)
- James DeBarge – backing vocals (5, 10)
- Dionne Farris – backing vocals (5), additional vocals (6)
- Jermaine Dupri – additional vocals (6)
- Manuel Seal – additional vocals (6)
- Bunny DeBarge – backing vocals (8, 9)
- Leon Ware – backing vocals (11)

== Production ==
- Benny Medina – executive producer
- Fred Moultrie – executive producer, management
- Leonard Richardson – executive producer
- Babyface – producer (1–4, 7)
- El DeBarge – producer (5, 9–11)
- Jermaine Dupri – producer (6)
- Tony Dofat – producer (8)
- Ivy Skoff – production coordinator (1–4, 7)
- Dawn Bonnell – album coordinator
- REY International – design
- F. Scott Schafer – photography

Technical credits

- Tom Baker – mastering at Future Disc (Hollywood, California)
- Brad Gilderman – recording (1–4, 7)
- Barney Perkins – recording (1–4, 7)
- Dave Way – mixing (1, 2, 4, 7)
- Jon Gass – mixing (3)
- Galen Senogles – recording (5, 9–11), mixing (9–11)
- Tony Maserati – mixing (5, 8), engineer (8)
- Phil Tan – engineer (6)
- Tony Dofat – mixing (8)
- El DeBarge – mixing (9–11)
- David Betancourt – assistant engineer (1–4, 7)
- Brian Soucy – assistant engineer (1–4, 7)
- Will Williams – assistant engineer (1–4, 7)
- Thom Russo – assistant mix engineer (1, 2, 4, 7)
- Gabriel Sutter – assistant engineer (3)
- W. Michael Lewis – second engineer (5, 9–11), mixing (9–11)
- Vaughan Merrick – mix assistant (5)
- Mike Alvord – second engineer (6)
- Brian Frye – second engineer (6)
- Hal Belknap – mix assistant (8)

== Charts ==
Chart (1994)	Peak position
US Billboard 200	127
US Top R&B/Hip-Hop Albums (Billboard)	24
