= Faith Evans =

American singer-songwriter (born 1973)

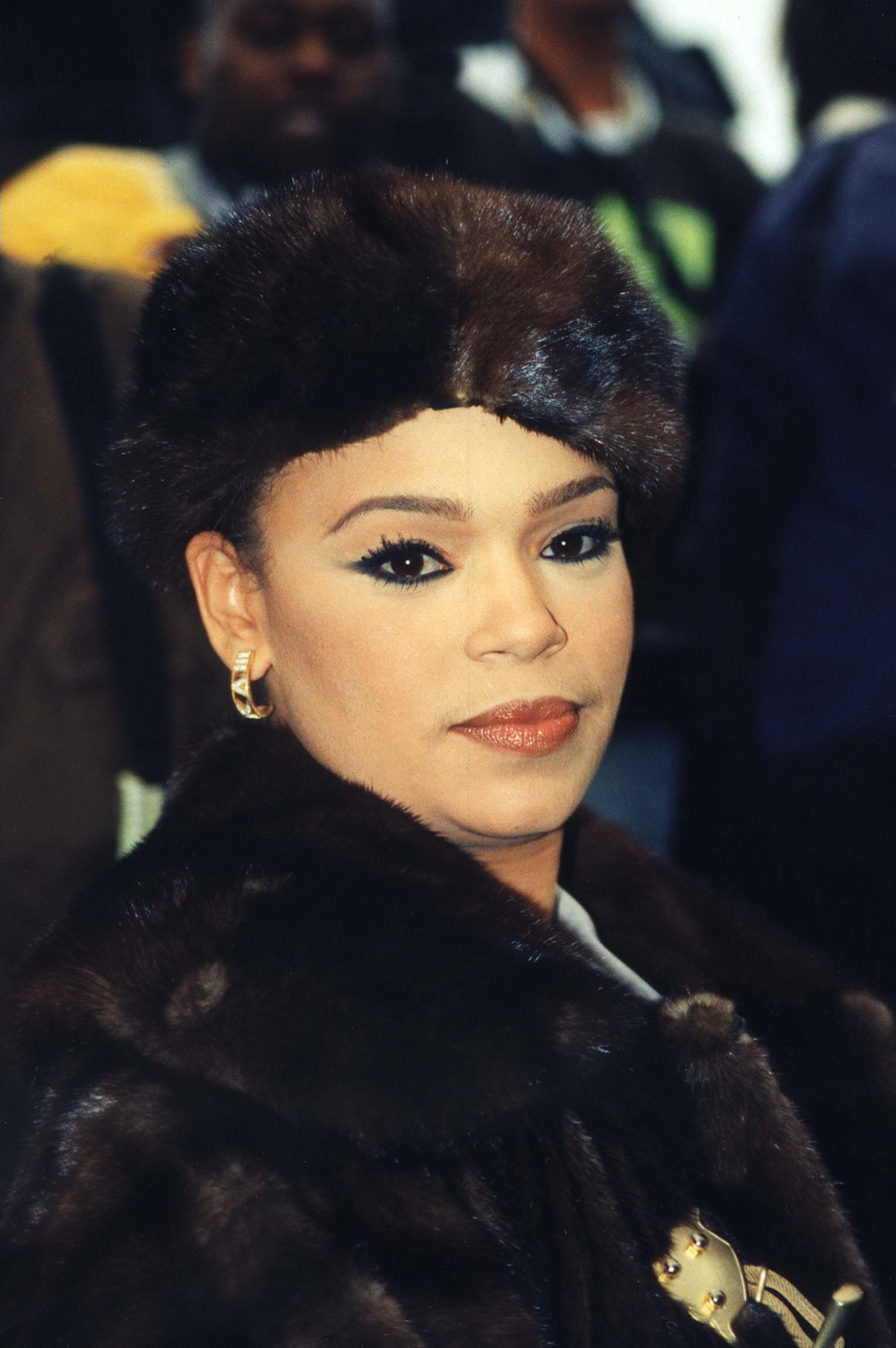
- Evans in 1998

Background information
- Born: Faith Renée Evans; June 10, 1973 (age 53); Lakeland, Florida, U.S.
- Origin: Newark, New Jersey, U.S.
- Education: Fordham University (no degree)
- Genres: R&B; hip-hop; soul
- Occupations: Singer-songwriter; actress
- Works: Faith Evans discography
- Years active: 1994–present
- Labels: Rhino; E1; Prolific; Capitol; Bad Boy; Arista; BMG
- Spouses: The Notorious B.I.G. (m. 1994; died 1997) (Note: Evans and Wallace had separated before Wallace's death.); Todd Russaw (m. 1998; div. 2011); Stevie J (m. 2018; div. 2023)
- Children: 4, including C. J. Wallace
- Website: faithevansmusic.com

Faith Renée Evans (born June 10, 1973) is an American singer, songwriter, and actress. Born in Lakeland, Florida, and raised in New Jersey, she relocated to Los Angeles in 1991 in pursuit of a recording career. Evans initially performed as a backing vocalist for R&B singers Al B. Sure! and Christopher Williams, and by the age of 20, signed with Sean Combs' Bad Boy Records as the label's first female artist in 1994. Following her uncredited appearance on labelmate the Notorious B.I.G.'s single "One More Chance", she released her debut studio album, Faith (1995), to critical acclaim and moderate commercial reception. Evans then guest performed alongside 112 on Combs' 1997 single "I'll Be Missing You," which won Best Rap Performance at the 40th Annual Grammy Awards and became the first hip hop song to debut atop the Billboard Hot 100. Her second and third albums, Keep the Faith (1998) and Faithfully (2001), peaked at numbers six and 14 on the Billboard 200, respectively, and saw further critical praise.

Evans parted ways with Bad Boy in favor of Capitol Records in 2003. Her fourth album, The First Lady (2005) peaked at number two on the Billboard 200 and topped the US Top R&B/Hip-Hop Albums chart, while her fifth album, A Faithful Christmas (2005)—a holiday album—failed to chart and served as her final release on a major label. After a hiatus, she released her sixth album, Something About Faith (2010) independently, followed by her seventh album, Incomparable (2014). With a career spanning three decades, Evans has sold over 20 million records worldwide.

Outside of recording, Evans is known as the widow of rapper Christopher "the Notorious B.I.G." Wallace, whom she married on August 4, 1994, after meeting the rapper at a Bad Boy photoshoot. The turbulent marriage resulted in Evans's involvement in the East Coast–West Coast hip hop rivalry—which dominated much of hip hop music's mainstream coverage at the time—and concluded with Wallace's unsolved drive-by murder on March 9, 1997. Also an actress and author, Evans made her screen debut on the 2000 musical drama Turn It Up by Robert Adetuyi. Her 2008 autobiography, Keep the Faith: A Memoir, was released by Grand Central Publishing and won a 2009 African American Literary Award for the Best Biography/Memoir category.

== Biography ==
=== 1973–1994: Early life and career beginnings ===
Evans was born on June 10, 1973, in Lakeland, Florida, to an African American mother, Helene Evans, a professional singer. Her father, Richard Swain, was a musician of English and possible Italian descent who left before Evans was born. Evans has said "I've heard people mumble something about him being Italian, but I don't know for sure". A half-year later, 19-year-old Helene returned to Newark, New Jersey, and left Faith with her cousin Johnnie Mae and husband Orvelt Kennedy, the foster parents of more than 100 children they raised during the time that Faith lived with them. Faith had known Johnnie Mae and Orvelt Kennedy as her grandparents. It was not until a couple of years later that Helene's career floundered and she tried to take Evans back home. Faith, however, was afraid to leave what she had "been used to," and instead, Helene relocated next door.

Raised in a Christian home, Evans began singing at church at age two. At age four, she caught the attention of the congregation of the Emmanuel Baptist Church in Newark when she sang The 5th Dimension's song "Let the Sunshine In". While attending University High School in Newark, she sang with several jazz bands and, encouraged by Helene, entered outside pageants, festivals and contests, where her voice would be noticed and praised. After graduating from high school in 1991, Evans attended Fordham University in New York City to study marketing but left a year later to have daughter Chyna with music producer Kiyamma Griffin. In 1993, she relocated to Los Angeles, where she worked as a backup vocalist for singer Al B. Sure!, when she was noticed by rapper Sean Combs. Impressed with her, Combs contracted her in 1994 as the first female artist to his Bad Boy Entertainment record label.

=== 1994–2001: Faith, Biggie, Keep The Faith, motherhood and marriage ===
Newly contracted to Bad Boy Records, Evans was asked by executive producer Combs to contribute backing vocals and co-write tracks for Mary J. Blige's My Life (1994) and Usher's self-titled debut album (1994) prior to starting work on her debut studio album Faith. Released in North America on August 29, 1995, the album was a main collaboration with Bad Boy's main producers, The Hitmen, including Chucky Thompson and Combs, but it also resulted in recordings with Poke & Tone and Herb Middleton. Faith became a success based on the singles "You Used to Love Me" and "Soon as I Get Home". The album was eventually certified platinum with 1.5 million copies sold, according to RIAA.

A year before, on August 4, 1994, Evans married rapper and labelmate Christopher "The Notorious B.I.G." Wallace, after having met him at a Bad Boy photoshoot. The couple had one child together, Christopher George Latore Wallace Jr. After allegations of an affair with Tupac Shakur, Evans became involved in the East Coast–West Coast hip hop rivalry which dominated rap music at the time. Wallace was murdered in a yet-to-be-solved drive-by shooting in Los Angeles, California, in March 1997. During early 1997, after her separation from Wallace, but before his death, Evans's friend Missy Elliott introduced her to record company executive Todd Russaw. Faith began dating Russaw during her and Wallace's separation and after Wallace died, Evans became pregnant by Russaw. The couple had their first son Joshua on June 10, 1998 (her 25th birthday). During the summer of 1998, Evans and Russaw were married, and on March 22, 2007, they had their second son Ryder Evan Russaw.

After Biggie's murder on March 9, 1997, Combs helped Evans produce her tribute song named "I'll Be Missing You", based on the melody of The Police's 1983 single "Every Breath You Take". The song, which featured Combs, Evans, and the all-male group 112, became a worldwide number-one success and debuted at number one on the US Billboard Hot 100 chart during 1997, scoring that for eleven weeks. It won Combs, Evans and 112 the 1998 Grammy Award for Best Rap Performance by a Duo or Group. The next year, she received another two Grammy nominations for "Heartbreak Hotel", a collaboration with singers Whitney Houston and Kelly Price, that scored number two on the Billboard Hot 100 chart.

Two years in the making, Evans's second studio album, Keep the Faith, was released by Bad Boy Records on October 27, 1998. Almost entirely written and produced by her, Evans considered the album difficult to complete as she had initially felt discouraged about the progress. Upon its release, however, the album earned generally positive reviews by music critics, with Allmusic noting it "without a doubt a highlight of 1990s soul-pop music". Also enjoying commercial success, it eventually went platinum and produced the top ten singles "Love Like This" and "All Night Long" (released on March 30, 1999) prompting Evans to start an 18-city theater tour with Dru Hill and Total the following year.

=== 2001–2007: Faithfully, legal issues, Capitol Records and The First Lady ===
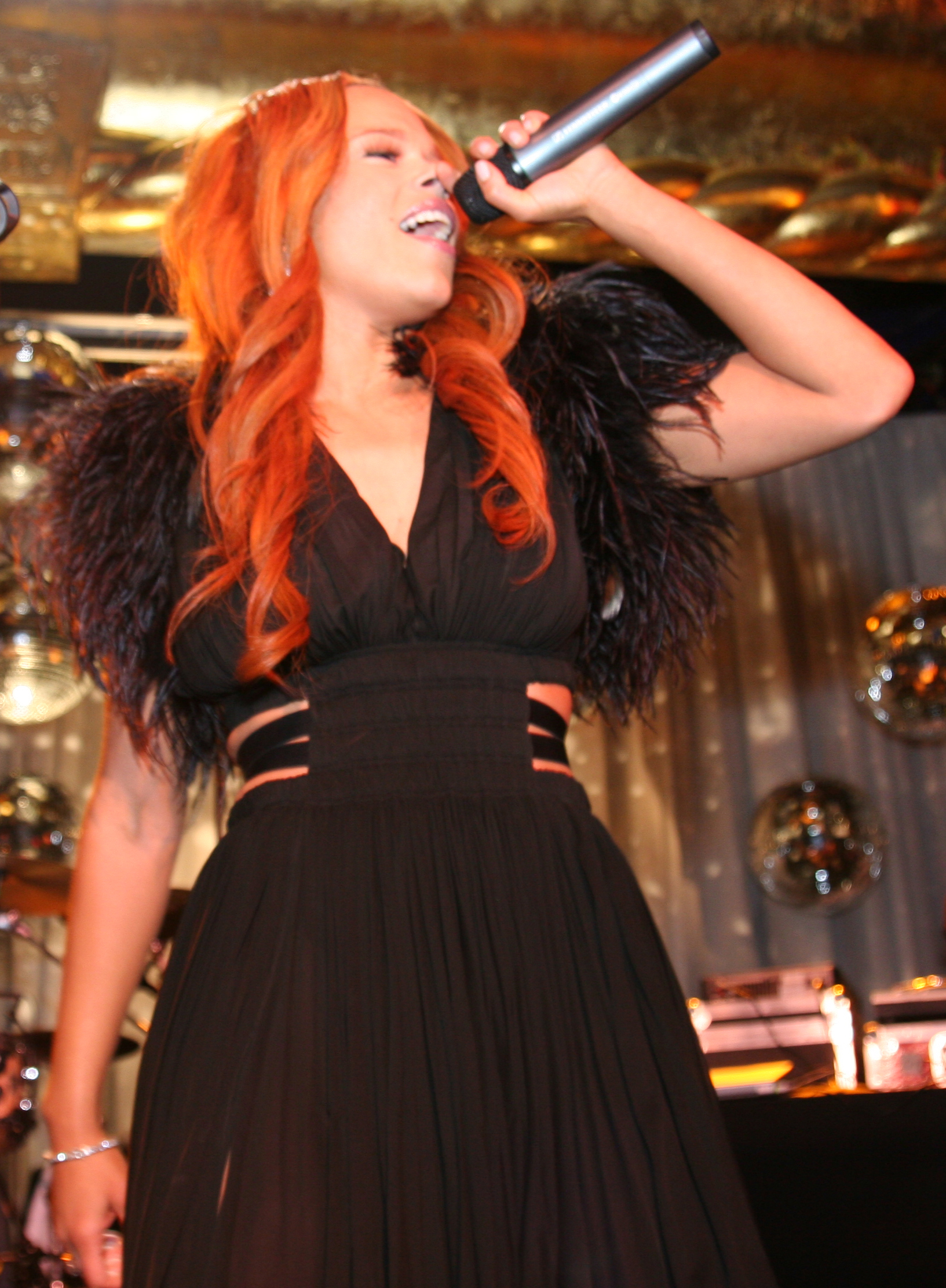
Evans performing in 2005

Evans's third album on the Bad Boy label, named Faithfully (2001), involved her working with a wider range of producers, including The Neptunes, Mario Winans, Buckwild, Vada Nobles, Cory Rooney, and others. Her first project with husband Todd Russaw as executive producer and creative partner, the album scored number 14 on the Billboard 200 album chart and number two on the Top R&B/Hip-Hop Albums chart, eventually being certified platinum, but yielded moderately successful singles, with the Jennifer Lopez-written "I Love You" becoming the only top twenty entry. Released amid Bad Boy Records' transition from distributor Arista Records to Universal, Evans felt Faithfully received minimum assistance by the company, and during 2004, she finally decided to end her business with Bad Boy as she was convinced Combs couldn't improve her career any more due to his other commitments. In January 2004, Evans and Russaw were arrested and charged with possession of marijuana and cocaine and an improper tag violation during a traffic stop in Hapeville, a suburb of Atlanta, Georgia.

After leaving Bad Boy Entertainment, Evans contracted with Capitol Records, becoming the first contemporary R&B artist to do so, and started work on her fourth studio album The First Lady, named after her nickname on her former label. As opposed to having an in-house team of producers who supplied most of the previous material, she and Russaw were able to gain more creative control of the album and consulted producers such as Bryan-Michael Cox, Jermaine Dupri, Mike Caren, Pharrell Williams, and Chucky Thompson to contribute to it. Upon its release in April 2005, The First Lady scored at number two on the Billboard 200 and number one on the Top R&B/Hip-Hop Albums chart, becoming Evans's best-charting album to date. It was eventually certified gold by the RIAA.

At the end of the year, Evans released A Faithful Christmas, a holiday album of traditional Christmas songs and original tracks. The effort became her last release on Capitol Records, as the company was bought in 2007.

=== 2005–2012: Hiatus, arrest, divorce and Something About Faith ===
Following a five-year hiatus, Evans created her own record label imprint in 2010. She named the imprint Prolific Music Group and hired top talent to build the record label from scratch. Evans began recording songs with Keyshia Cole, Redman, Snoop Dogg and Raekwon, among others for the label's freshman album. Evans signed a deal with independent record label E1 Entertainment later that year. Her fifth studio album, Something About Faith, was released on October 5, 2010, in the United States, where it debuted and peaked at number fifteen on the Billboard 200 and number one on the Independent Albums chart. Something About Faith has spawned the leading single "Gone Already", which spent over thirty-three weeks on the US Billboard Hot R&B/Hip-Hop Songs chart, where it peaked at number twenty-two.

In August 2010, Evans was arrested on suspicion of misdemeanor drunken driving, after being stopped at a checkpoint in Marina del Rey, California. In 2011, Evans filed for divorce against Russaw. The couple agreed to spend 13 weeks in a drug-treatment program in exchange for halting any further prosecution of their drug-possession case. In May 2011, Evans and Russaw announced they were getting a divorce, and stated they would like to keep it quiet for their children's sakes.

=== 2012–2016: R&B Divas: Atlanta and Incomparable ===
In 2012, Evans co-executive produced and became a cast member on the TV One reality show R&B Divas: Atlanta alongside fellow R&B singers Nicci Gilbert, Syleena Johnson, Keke Wyatt and Monifah. The show offered an inside look at how the singers balance their music careers and personal lives as they work towards producing an Evans-led compilation album, R&B Divas (2012), in memory of Whitney Houston. Broadcast to rating records for the network, the series produced a spin-off titled R&B Divas: Los Angeles and was renewed for two further seasons. Evans, who left the show following its second season, earned a Grammy nomination for Best R&B Album at the 55th awards ceremony.

In August 2013, Evans confirmed she had begun work on her seventh studio album Incomparable, with contribution from Chucky Thompson, Mike City, Keke Wyatt, B.Slade and Karen Clark Sheard of The Clark Sisters. "I Deserve It", a record featuring recurring collaborator Missy Elliott and her protégée Sharaya J, was released on August 25, 2014, as the album's lead single and peaked at number 19 on Billboard's Adult R&B Songs chart. Incomparable was released on November 24, 2014, by Prolific Music Group and BMG Rights Management. It debuted at number 27 on the US Top R&B/Hip-Hop Albums and number 17 on the US Independent Albums chart.

=== 2016–present: The King & I, and The Masked Singer ===
In 2016, Evans announced that she was finishing a posthumous Notorious B.I.G. album titled The King & I, featuring duets with her late husband. The album was released on May 19, 2017.

On July 17, 2018, she married producer and Love & Hip Hop: Atlanta star Stevie J. The couple released the song "A Minute" on July 27, 2018. Between 2015 and 2019 Evans appeared in several episodes of Love & Hip Hop: Atlanta, and Leave It to Stevie alongside then-friend Stevie J.

In May 2020, Evans was arrested for felony domestic violence against Stevie J. She was released on bond and the charges were later dropped. In 2021, Stevie J filed for divorce. The divorce was finalized in 2023.

In 2021, Evans competed in season six of The Masked Singer as "Skunk". She was unmasked during the Group A Finals where she made references to the loss of The Notorious B.I.G. and her son being autistic.

== Other ventures ==
=== Acting ===
Having previously appeared in stage plays as a teenager, Evans began acting with a supporting role in director Robert Adetuyi's 2000 music drama Turn It Up, featuring Pras Michel from The Fugees, Jason Statham and Ja Rule. Released to generally negative reviews from critics, who noted it "patently absurd in both the details and larger aspects", the indie film had a short play and became a financial disappointment, gaining US$1.24 million during its U.S. run only.

During 2003, Evans acted in the MTV-produced romantic comedy The Fighting Temptations in which she appeared in a brief but major role portraying a single mother and night club singer. Filmed in Columbus, Georgia, and headed by Cuba Gooding Jr. (her character is his mother) and Beyoncé Knowles, the film garnered mixed reviews by critics, but scored top three of the U.S. box office, resulting in a domestic gross of US$30.2 million. In addition, Evans recorded a contemporary cover version of Donna Summer's 1978 success "Heaven Knows" for the film which her character performs during one of the first in sequence in the film. The accompanying soundtrack scored the top twenty of the U.S. Billboard 200.

In 2004, Evans earned a brief guest stint on the UPN situation comedy Half & Half. In 2009, Evans announced that she had been working on a synopsis for her own situation comedy that would be based largely on her life but with a more comedic aspect. It is unknown whether she has officially pitched the sitcom to any television networks, as of 2024.

Evans has had cameos on the reality show Love & Hip Hop: Atlanta.

=== Florence Ballard biopic ===
In November 2010, several sources stated that Faith would portray Motown star Florence Ballard of the Supremes in an upcoming biopic, Blondie: The Florence Ballard Story. With the blessing of Ballard's three daughters, Faith later appeared on The Wendy Williams Show to promote this role. In July 2014, Rolling Stone reported that the movie, thought to be titled "Blondie", was in fact a con artist's scam.

=== Writing ===
Evans released her autobiographic book called Keep the Faith: A Memoir on August 29, 2008. Written with Aliya S. King, it detailed the singer's life, but also discussed Evans's controversial relationship with her late husband, the Notorious B.I.G.:

"I want people to understand that although he was a large part of my life, my story doesn't actually begin or end with Big's death. My journey has been complicated on many levels. And since I am always linked to Big, there are a lot of misconceptions about who I really am. It's not easy putting your life out there for the masses. But I've decided I'll tell my own story. For Big. For my children. And for myself."

In its initial release, Keep the Faith: A Memoir landed in the Top 20 on New York Times Best Seller's List two weeks in a row. The book received the 2009 African American Literary Award for Best Biography/Memoir.

== Philanthropy ==
In 2014, Evans showed support for Little Kids Rock by donating items for auction to raise money in support of music education in public schools.

== Artistry ==
Evans said that some of her biggest musical influences and favourite singers are gospel singer Karen Clark-Sheard (whom she has been often likened to), Shirley Murdock, Chaka Khan, Anita Baker and Aretha Franklin.

Evans is noted for her "urban-edged honeyed soprano." Her vocal range extends from the low note of C#3 to high soprano C#6 . The Washington Post writer Craig Seymour called her "angelic yet hearty soprano" as showcasing emotion that is defined by Evans' personal experiences of tragedy, love, pain and heartbreak.

== Legal issues ==
In 2025, Faith Evans was sued by the estate of Voletta Wallace over the sale of the Notorious B.I.G. catalog to Primary Wave Music. Biggie's former manager Wayne Barrow filed the lawsuit on behalf of the estate.

== Discography ==
- Faith (1995)
- Keep the Faith (1998)
- Faithfully (2001)
- The First Lady (2005)
- A Faithful Christmas (2005)
- Something About Faith (2010)
- Incomparable (2014)
- The King & I (with The Notorious B.I.G.) (2017)

== Tours ==
- Keep the Faith Tour (1999)
- The First Lady Tour (2005)
- Something About Faith Tour (2010–11)
- An Evening with Faith (2012)
- Faith Evans Live (2013)
- Bad Boy Family Reunion Tour (2016–17)

== Filmography ==
- 2000: Turn It Up
- 2003: The Fighting Temptations
- 2009: Notorious
- 2011: Soul Kittens Cabaret
- 2020: True to the Game 2: Gena's Story

== Television ==
- 2012: R&B Divas: Atlanta (Executive Producer & Main Cast)
- 2013: R&B Divas: Los Angeles (Executive Producer)
- 2015: Real Husbands of Hollywood (Guest Star)
- 2015; 2016—19 Love & Hip Hop: Atlanta (Guest Star & Main Cast)
- 2016: Stevie J & Joseline: Go Hollywood (Guest Star)
- 2016: RuPaul's Drag Race (Guest Judge, "RuCo's Empire")
- 2018: Luke Cage (Singer at club in "Code of the Streets", "The Main Ingredient")
- 2021: The Masked Singer (Herself/Skunk)

== Awards and nominations ==
Grammy Awards nominations for Faith Evans
Year	Nominee / work	Award	Result
1998	"I'll Be Missing You" (with Puff Daddy featuring 112)	Best Rap Performance by a Duo or Group	Won
1999	"Love Like This"	Best Female R&B Vocal Performance	Nominated
2000	"Heartbreak Hotel" (with Whitney Houston & Kelly Price)	Best R&B Performance by a Duo or Group with Vocal	Nominated
2002	"Can't Believe" (with Carl Thomas)	Best R&B Performance by a Duo or Group with Vocal	Nominated
2003	Faithfully	Best Contemporary R&B Album	Nominated
2011	"Gone Already"	Best Female R&B Vocal Performance	Nominated
2014	R&B Divas	Best R&B Album	Nominated
2016	"He Is"	Best Traditional R&B Performance	Nominated
