= Frankau (surname) =

Frankau is an English surname of German-Jewish origin.

== List of people with the surname ==
(Most (all?) are related).

- Arthur Frankau (1849–1904), London merchant
- Claude Frankau (1883–1967), British surgeon
- Gilbert Frankau (1884–1952), British novelist and poet
- Isabella Frankau (died 1967), British psychiatrist (Lady Frankau)
- Joan Bennett (literary scholar) (1896–1986), British literary scholar (née Frankau)
- Julia Frankau (1859–1916), British novelist
- Nicholas Frankau (born 1954), English actor
- Pamela Frankau (1908–1967), English novelist
- Ronald Frankau (1894–1951), English comedian
- Rosemary Frankau (1933–2017), British actress

== See also ==
- Frank (surname)
