= Julia Frankau =

English art historian and novelist (1859–1916)

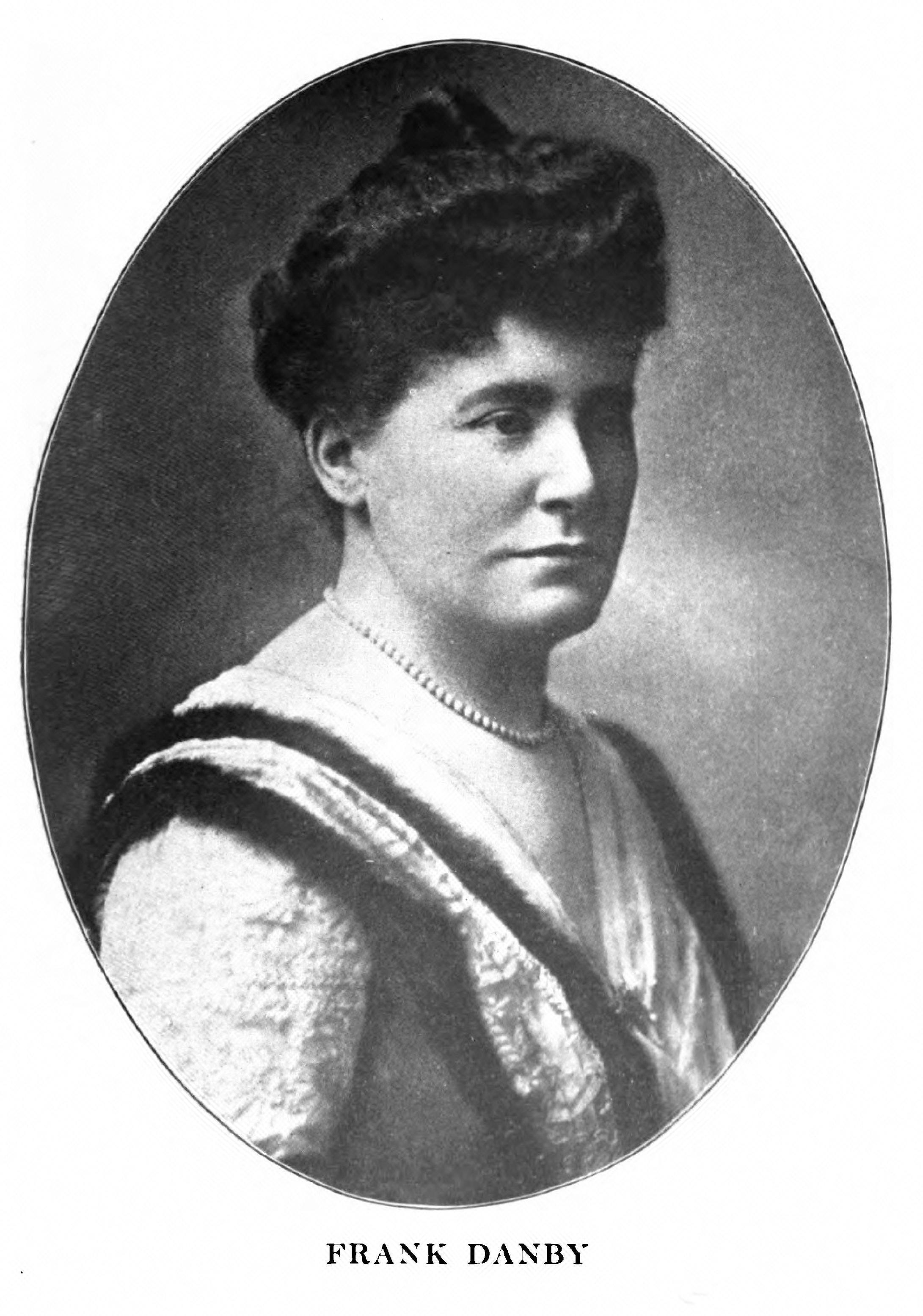
- Frankau in 1912
- Born: Julia Davis; 30 July 1859; Dublin, Ireland
- Died: 17 March 1916 (aged 56); Mayfair, London, England
- Resting place: Hampstead Cemetery
- Occupations: Art historian; novelist
- Spouse: Arthur Frankau (m. 1883; died 1904)
- Children: 5, including: Gilbert Frankau; Ronald Frankau; Joan Bennett
- Relatives: Owen Hall (brother); Eliza Davis (sister); Marcus Evelyn Collins (brother-in-law); Renee Roberts (daughter-in-law); Henry Stanley Bennett (son-in-law); Rosemary Frankau (granddaughter); Pamela Frankau (granddaughter); Sam Bain (great-grandson); Timothy D'Arch Smith (great-grandson)
- Writing career
- Pen name: Frank Danby
- Subject: Jewish life in London

Julia Frankau (née Davis; 30 July 1859 – 17 March 1916), known by the pen name Frank Danby, was an English art historian and novelist. Her first novel was published in 1887: Dr. Phillips: A Maida Vale Idyll. Its portrayal of London Jews and Jewish life, and its depiction of murder by a doctor were controversial. This was followed by more Frank Danby novels and by books on other subjects, including engraving, which were sometimes written under her own name. Frankau continued to write until the time of her death.

== Early life and education ==
Frankau was born Julia Davis on 30 July 1859 in Dublin to Anglo-Jewish parents Hyman Davis (1824–1875), a dentist and later portrait photographer, and Isabella Davis (1824–1900). The seventh of nine siblings, Frankau was the sister of the librettist and journalist James Davis, known by the pen name Owen Hall, and the fashion journalist, editor and socialite Eliza Davis. (Note: Also cited as the sixth of eight siblings.) Frankau was also the sister of the American based journalist Harrie Davis, and the writer Florette Collins.

The family returned to London in 1864 (Note: Also cited as 1863.), living in Bruton Street before settling in Warrington Crescent. Raised in a observant Reform Jewish household, the family belonged to West London Synagogue. Frankau first attended Miss Belisario's School before being educated at home. Educated by a tutor and later by Laura Lafargue, Frankau's formal education ended when she was 12 years old following her father's death. Frankau's education continued informally under her brother James, through whom she was introduced to London's bohemian society.

== Marriage and religious life ==
On 28 March 1883, Frankau married Arthur Frankau, one of three partners in the wholesale cigar importing business J. Frankau & Co, at the West London Synagogue. Arthur was raised in an assimilated Jewish family, and only joined the West London Synagogue a month before the couple's wedding in order to appease his future mother-in-law. The couple had five children (Note: Also cited as four.) including the novelist and poet Gilbert Frankau, the comedian Ronald Frankau and the literary scholar and critic Joan Bennett. The couple's daughter Joanna (1888–1889) died in infancy and their son Paul "Jack" Frankau (1890–1917), died whilst serving in Mandatory Palestine during First World War. The family lived in Gloucester Terrace, Weymouth Street and later settled in Mayfair.

Both Julia and Arthur believed in radical assimilation and following the birth of couple's first child Gilbert in 1884, refused to have him circumcised. As a result the Frankau's either broke with or were expelled from their Synagogue, and the families' connection to religious Judaism ended. Adopting radical assimilation, the Frankau's raised their children in the Church of England, sent them to boarding school, and their son Gilbert was not informed of his Jewish ancestry until the age of 16.

== Career ==
=== Dr Phillips ===
The first Frank Danby novel, originally published by Vizetelly in 1887, was a somewhat controversial social satire set in the affluent Jewish Maida Vale world where the author herself – "a Jewish girl from an Anglo-Jewish family of impeccable orthodoxy" – had grown up. Punch was said to have commented: "It should never have been written. Having been written, it should never have been published. Having been published, it should not be read."

Dr Phillips earned notoriety on two counts. "The Jews in Frankau's novel are repugnant. They are almost without exception uneducated, narrow, clannish, vulgar, materialistic, and tasteless." "Imagine the shock," recalled Horace Collins, "when it was discovered that the book contained characters with obvious likenesses to members of the family and cronies of my mother. Their idiosyncrasies and weaknesses had been held up to ridicule with mordant wit and subtle irony. ... Dr Phillips was, in fact, in advance of the times and might be deemed to have been the precursor of the smart Society type of novel."

The second controversial aspect was the conduct of the eponymous doctor, who deliberately administers a lethal morphia overdose to his (German-Jewish) wife in the hope of being able to marry his (Gentile) mistress, the mother of his illegitimate daughter. It was bruited at the time of publication that the fictional Jewish Dr Phillips (named Dr Abrams in a pre-publication draft) was based on the real-life (Jewish) surgeon Ernest Abraham Hart, then editor of the British Medical Journal, whose first wife had died by "accidental poisoning" in 1861. Mrs Aria insisted that Dr Phillips had "fluttered the dovecotes of Maida Vale, rattled the skeletons in the cupboards and the stout ladies at the card-tables, but never merited the popular suspicion that the hero was taken from life." On the other hand, Mrs Belloc Lowndes suggested that the characters in Dr Phillips had been more closely based on real-life individuals than those of any other Frank Danby novel, recalling particularly that the character of Dr Phillips "was supposed to have been drawn from a well-known doctor, and he must have felt the cap fitted his head, for he bought up and destroyed every copy he was able to procure."

"The scandal of Dr Phillips was compounded by publication the following year of Amy Levy's Reuben Sachs (1888). Levy was almost as harsh in her delineation of Jewish manners and morals, and the two works became linked in public discussion, the notoriety of each reinforcing that of the other."

=== Art history ===
During the 1890s, Julia Frankau began to research and write on engraving, ultimately publishing (under her own married name) three books on the subject. Her sister Eliza recalled: "having started a small collection of eighteenth-century engravings of mezzotint and stipple, she particularly favoured the English stipple colour prints, and because no book existed telling her what she wanted to know about them, she set to work and wrote one."

=== Later novels ===
After she returned to fiction – or, to use her own phrase, "relapsed into novel writing" – in 1902, The Sketch found "something quaint in the thought that Mrs Frankau – who, as 'Frank Danby', has recently published that brilliant study of contemporary manners (and morals), Pigs in Clover – should be, as she is without question, the greatest living authority on that daintiest product of the eighteenth century, the colour-print."

The commercial success of Pigs in Clover, which coincided with a substantial inheritance from Arthur's late brother and business partner Edwin Frankau (1854–1903), permitted Arthur and Julia Frankau to move from Weymouth Street to 11 Clarges Street, as well as acquiring a seaside retreat named Clover Cottage (now 13 South Cliff, Eastbourne). Their Clarges Street house was said to have been occupied at one time by Emma, Lady Hamilton, thus providing inspiration for Frank Danby's Story of Emma, Lady Hamilton.

Mrs Aria commented that The Sphinx's Lawyer was "written to defend the undefendable Oscar Wilde" – she and Frank Danby having both, through their brother Owen Hall, met Wilde in their youth. It is probably not accidental that "Sphinx" was Wilde's name for their mutual friend and fellow-writer Ada Leverson. The Sphinx's Lawyer was dedicated to Owen Hall who, according to its author, vehemently disapproved both the story and its subject matter. The printed dedication, addressed directly to her brother, fills a page and a half, insisting: "your harsh criticism has intensified my conviction of the righteousness of the cause I plead ... I have heard all your argument; I know where I stand. It is at the foot of the Throne of Mercy, with my client by my side, the client of the Sphinx's Lawyer. You, as well as I, know what he was in his brilliant youth, you, as well as I, know how weak he was in his strength, of what flawed physique and untoward inheritance. Pity was the one unsounded note in the chorus of execration that followed this poor leper to his grave, and beyond it; to awaken pity I have written."

The Heart of a Child (1908), a less controversial tale based on a storyline devised by Owen Hall, enjoyed great commercial success as a novel, was twice filmed as a motion picture, and rewritten in 1920 by Gilbert Frankau as a stage play – in which form it did not succeed, though Frankau noted that the novel itself was still earning royalties in the summer of 1939. The heroine Sally Snape was played by Edna Flugrath in the first film version, Alla Nazimova in the second, and Renée Kelly in Gilbert Frankau's theatrical adaptation. Her most popular novel was Joseph in Jeopardy (1912).

Twilight was a novel completed by Frank Danby on her deathbed, about a female author on her deathbed who is inspired to write about the death of a female author. The character of the ailing Jane Vevaseur is a semi-autobiographical portrayal of Julia Frankau, while her loving sister Eliza Aria is represented by the character of Ella Lovegrove. The title itself is a doubly resonant play on words – the dictum "Work whilst ye have the light" is quoted several times by the narrator, alluding to the fact that she (like Frank Danby) is running out of time; and it transpires that Dr Kennedy, Jane Vevaseur's medical attendant, brought about the death of writer Margaret Capel some years previously by deliberately administering a lethal overdose of what the narrator refers to as "hyoscine", a drug known in its day as "Twilight Sleep". Unlike the undetected murder in Dr Phillips, however, this one is conducted with great reluctance at the patient's own poignant request.

"Notes for Collectors" provides publishing history for her writing including color plates of covers.

== Personal life ==
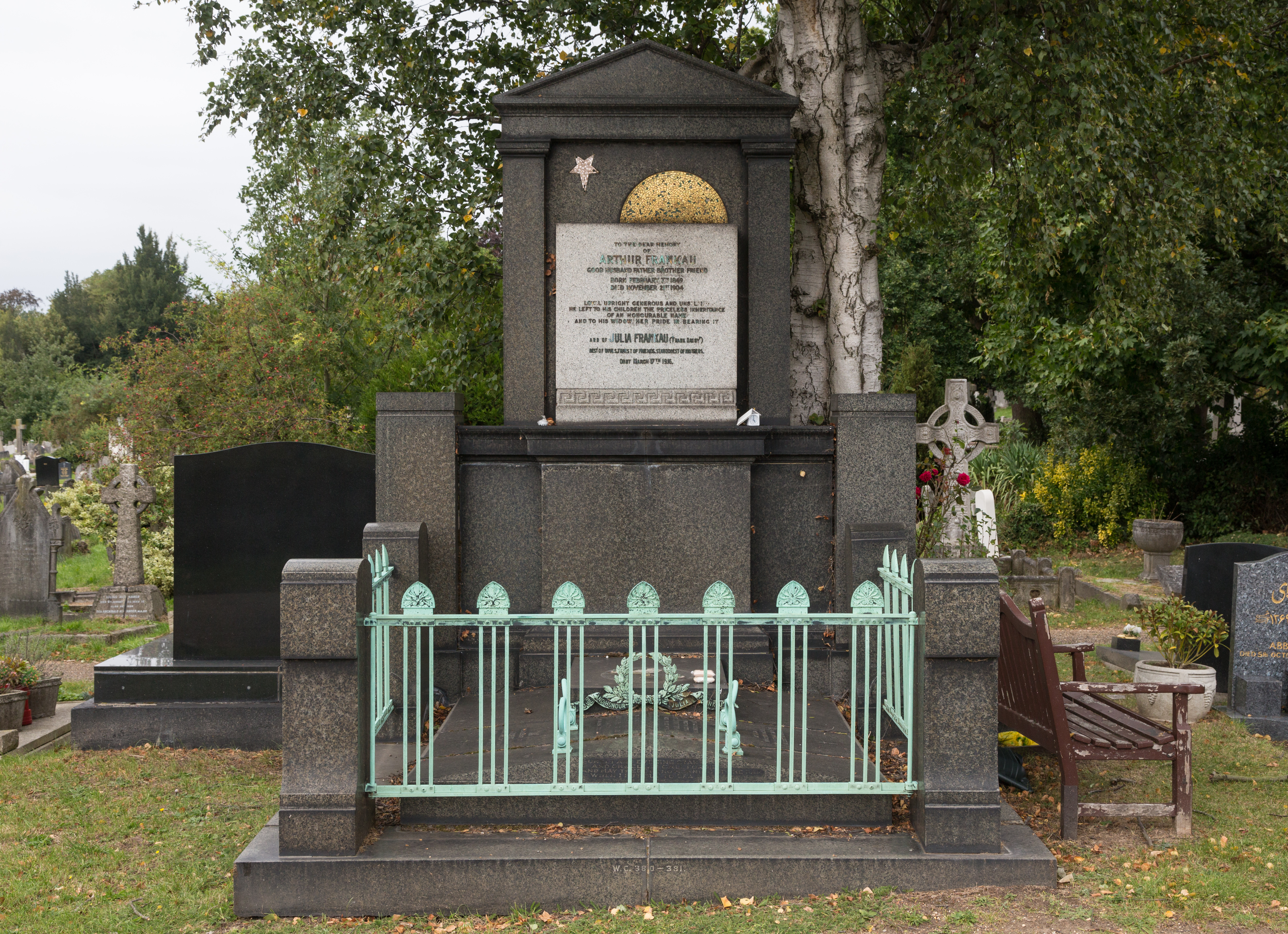
Frankau family tomb in Hampstead Cemetery

The grandmother of the writer Pamela Frankau, the actress Rosemary Frankau, Frankau was the great-grandmother of the bibliographer Timothy D'Arch Smith and scriptwriter Sam Bain. Julia's sister Florette married architect Marcus E. Collins in 1889, thus connecting the Davis and Frankau families with Arthur Collins of Drury Lane Theatre, theatrical manager Horace Collins, and stage director Frank Collins. Florette Collins published one novel in 1906, whereupon her sisters suggested she should content herself with being "the beauty of the family". The actor Henry Irving joined Arthur and Julia Frankau's family circle after Mrs Aria became his mistress in the 1890s.

On 17 March 1916, Frankau died at her home in Mayfair, London aged 56. Frankau's ashes were buried at the Frankau family tomb at Hampstead Cemetery.

== Bibliography ==
=== Novels ===
- Danby, Frank (1887). Dr. Phillips: A Maida Vale Idyll. London: Vizetelly & Company.
- Danby, Frank (1889). A Babe in Bohemia. London: Spencer Blackett.
- Danby, Frank (1889). The Copper Crash. London: Trischler & Co.
- Danby, Frank (1892). "Chapter 12". The Fate of Fenella. New York City: Cassell.
- Danby, Frank (1903). Pigs in Clover. London: William Heinemann.
- Danby, Frank (1904). Baccarat. London: William Heinemann.
- Danby, Frank (1906). The Sphinx's Lawyer. London: William Heinemann.
- Danby, Frank (1907). A Coquette in Crepe. A Tragedy of Circumstance. London: Chatto & Windus.
- Danby, Frank (1908). The Heart of a Child: Being Passages from the Early Life of Sally Snape, Lady Kidderminster. Leipzig: Bernhard Tauchnitz.
- Danby, Frank (1909). An Incompleat Etonian. London: William Heinemann.
- Danby, Frank (1909). Sebastian. New York: Macmillan.
- Danby, Frank (1910). Nelson's Legacy. Lady Hamilton: Her Story and Tragedy. London: Cassell.
- Danby, Frank (1910). Let the Roof Fall In. London: William Heinemann.
- Danby, Frank (1912). Joseph in Jeopardy. London: Methuen & Co.
- Danby, Frank (1913). Concert Pitch. New York: Macmillan.
- Danby, Frank (1914). Full Swing. Philadelphia; London: J. B. Lippincott & Co.
- Danby, Frank (1916). Twilight. London: William Heinemann.

=== Art history ===
- Frankau, Julia (1900). Eighteenth Century Colour Prints: an Essay on certain Stipple Engravers and their Work in Colour. London: Macmillan & Co.
- Frankau, Julia (1902). An Eighteenth Century Artist & Engraver: John Raphael Smith; His Life and Works. London: Macmillan & Co.
- Frankau, Julia (1904). Eighteenth Century Artists and Engravers William Ward A.R.A. James Ward R.A. Their Lives and Works. London: Macmillan & Co.

=== Posthumous ===
- Frankau, Julia (1918). Mothers and Children. Hitherto unpublished stories by the late “Frank Danby.” With a preface by her eldest son, Gilbert Frankau. London: William Collins, Sons & Co.

== Sources ==
- Endelman, Todd (1994). "The Frankaus of London: A Study in Radical Assimilation, 1837–1967". Jewish History. 8 (1–2). Springer Nature: 117–154.
- Frankau, Gilbert (1940). Gilbert Frankau's Self-Portrait: A Novel of His Own Life. London: Hutchinson & Co.
