= Owen Hall =

British theatre writer (1853–1907)

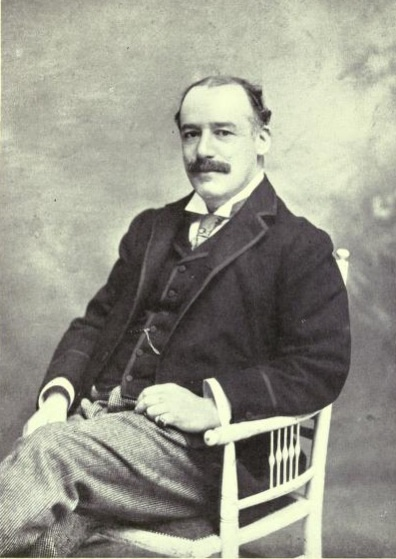
Owen Hall

Hall (seated left) with George Edwardes (c) and Sidney Jones

Owen Hall (10 April 1853 – 9 April 1907) was the principal pen name of the Irish-born theatre writer, racing correspondent, theatre critic and solicitor, James Davis, when writing for the stage. After his successive careers in law and journalism, Hall wrote the librettos for a series of extraordinarily successful musical comedies in the 1890s and the first decade of the 1900s, including A Gaiety Girl, An Artist's Model, The Geisha, A Greek Slave and Florodora. Despite his achievements, Hall was constantly in financial distress because of his gambling and extravagant lifestyle; his pseudonym was a pun on "owing all".

== Life and career ==
Born in a Jewish household, Hall was the eldest son of an English dentist who practised in Dublin and later became a portrait photographer in London, Hyman Davis (1824–1875), and his wife Isabella (1824–1900), whose maiden name was also Davis. The Davis family returned to London in the 1850s, and James graduated from University College London as a Bachelor of Laws in 1869. Among his eight siblings were Julia, a successful novelist under the name "Frank Danby", who married businessman Arthur Frankau and was the mother of the author Gilbert Frankau and the comedian Ronald Frankau and grandmother of the novelist Pamela Frankau and the actress Rosemary Frankau; Eliza, who was the journalist "Mrs. Aria" and long-time lover of the actor Henry Irving; Harrie (1864–1920), who became a journalist in the US; and Florence ("Florette") a novelist who married Marcus E. Collins, brother of Arthur Collins, the manager of the Theatre Royal, Drury Lane.

In the 1870s, Hall (still known as James Davis) married Esther Josephine (née Da Costa Andrade, 1854–1946) and had three children, Isabelle Davis (1877–1935), Hyman Davis (1878–1950) and Dorothy Davis (1880–1963). Isabel married Gerald Benjamin, the son of mayor Benjamin Benjamin of Melbourne, in 1912. Hyman married Helen Davis (so she didn't change surname) in 1914. Dorothy married a Belgian diplomat, Baron Marie-Georges-Gérard-Léon le Maire de Warzée d'Hermalle (1877–1931), and wrote of her travels in Persia, Peeps into Persia (1913), under the name of Dorothy de Warzée.

=== Early career ===
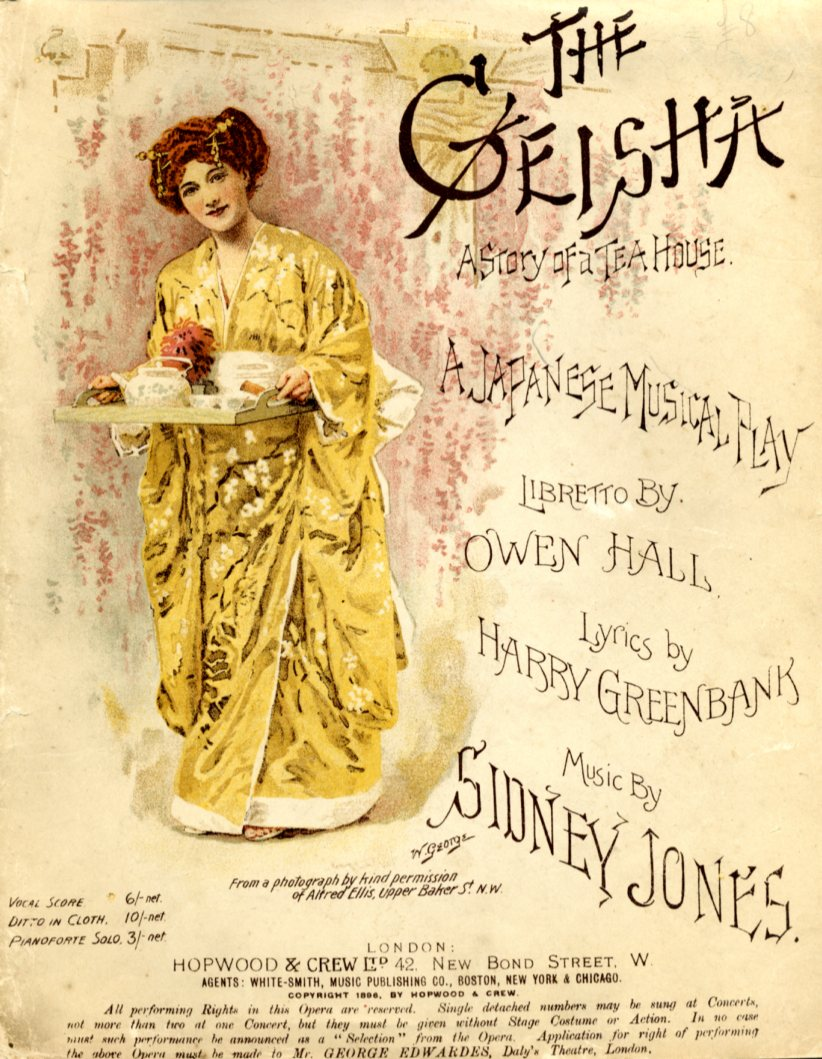
The Geisha vocal score

After practising from 1874 to 1886 as a solicitor, Hall gave up the law in favour of journalism, starting a newspaper called Pan, which "went to popularity and thence through an inexperienced direction to death", after which he "owned and edited in turn The Bat [1885–87], The Cuckoo and The Phoenix [after 1899], whilst writing industriously [and caustically] for The Sporting Times many paragraphs on ... racing, and dramatic criticisms, under the signature 'Stalled Ox'." He also wrote for Truth, The World, The Illustrated London News and the Ladies' Pictorial. He was assistant editor of Galignani's Messenger from 1888 to 1890. Hall and his sisters had been friendly with Oscar Wilde and his brother William, but Hall later became a harsh critic of Wilde. Hall was, for a time, interested in politics and ran (unsuccessfully) against the Liberal statesman Charles Russell for the Parliamentary seat of Dundalk in the 1880 election.

The change of career from critic to librettist came after he expressed a harsh view of a George Edwardes production, In Town (1892); the producer challenged Hall to do better. The result was the hit of the West End theatre season, A Gaiety Girl (1893), with music by Sidney Jones and lyrics by Harry Greenbank. Hall's satirical book included lines that jabbed in the style of an upmarket gossip columnist. The smart society back-chat was very popular with audiences, and A Gaiety Girl has a claim to being the first true musical comedy. Hall's next libretto was for An Artist's Model (1895), another success for the same writing team. He repeated the snappy dialogue style of the previous work, but joined it with a romantic plot, which Hall added at the last minute after Edwardes hired the star Marie Tempest, for whom Hall quickly wrote a new role. The result established the formula for two further extraordinary successes by Hall and his collaborators at Daly's Theatre.

The first of these was The Geisha (1896), which became the biggest international hit in musical theatre history, playing for 760 performances in its original London run and enjoying numerous international productions. The next collaboration for Hall, Jones and Greenbank was another popular work for Daly's, A Greek Slave (1898).

Music from Leslie Stuart and Owen Hall's Florodora (1899)
"Tell me pretty maiden"
Edison Records, c. 1908: "Edison Sextette": Ada Jones, George S. Lenox, Corinne Morgan, Grace Nelson, Bob Roberts and Frank C. Stanley

"In the shade of the palm"
Edison Records, 1902: Frank C. Stanley

Hall declared bankruptcy first at the age of 29, during his early career as a solicitor, having run up debts of more than £27,000. He was back in bankruptcy court six years later, in 1888. Even after his theatrical success and high salary from Edwardes, he was bankrupt again in 1898. His constant financial trouble stemmed from his gambling and extravagant entertaining of his friends. The pseudonym "Owen Hall" was an ironic nod ("owin' all") towards his extensive debts, as was another of his pseudonyms, "Payne Nunn" ("payin' none"). His sister Eliza recalled: "As a lawyer he gave advice freely to his friends; as a racehorse owner he indulged his prodigal proclivities in the world of hangers-on; during his editorial and play-writing epochs he was lavish in his hospitality ... and he voiced his belief that he 'had enjoyed every experience except death and solvency'." She wrote that, during his bankruptcy proceedings, Hall quipped irreverently: "Now I know that my Receiver liveth". His nephew Gilbert recalled that Hall said: "You can trust me with anything except a pretty girl or a sovereign."

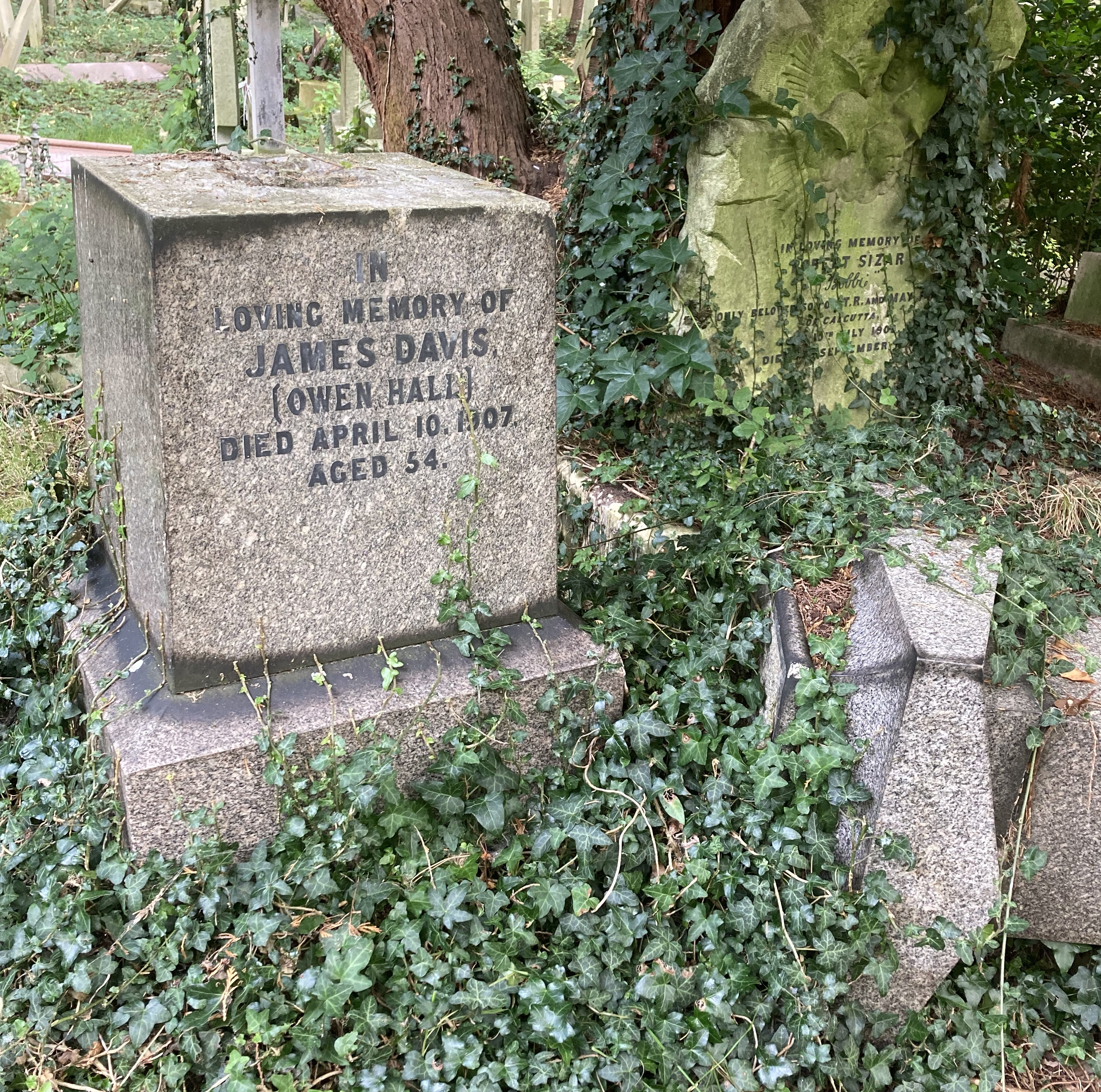
Hall's grave in Highgate Cemetery

=== Florodora and later years ===
Hall wrote the musical Florodora (1899) for producer Tom Davis, which was set to music by Leslie Stuart, and the piece became another record-setting international hit, running for 455 performances in London, and then 552 performances in New York, followed by other international productions and revivals.

Hall wrote several more works in the new century, including two more musicals for Davis: The Silver Slipper (1901) with Stuart, and the unsuccessful The Medal and the Maid (1903) with Jones. For Edwardes, he wrote "perhaps the most delightful of all his libretti" and his last big success, The Girl from Kays (1902), and later The Little Cherub (1906). A 1904 piece was Sergeant Brue, written with Liza Lehmann.

He died in Harrogate, one day short of his 54th birthday, and was buried in Highgate Cemetery, north London,
