= Ronald Frankau =

English comedian (1894–1951)

- Publicity photo of Frankau, dated 1949
- Born: 22 February 1894; London, England
- Died: 11 September 1951 (aged 57); Eastbourne
- Occupation: Comedian
- Spouse: Renee Roberts (m. 1930–1951)

Ronald Hugh Wyndham Frankau (22 February 1894 – 11 September 1951) was an English comedian who started in cabaret, before appearing on radio and in films.

== Early life and family ==
Ronald Frankau was born in London, the third child of Arthur Frankau, son of Joseph Frankau, a German Jew who came to London from Frankfurt in the late 1830s and started a cigar trading business. Ronald's mother was Julia Davis Frankau, who would later become a celebrated writer of satirical novels. His mother's siblings included Henry Irving's mistress Eliza Aria and theatre critic and librettist Owen Hall, whilst their sister Florette was married to architect Marcus Collins, a brother of Drury Lane Theatre manager Arthur Collins. Ronald's brother Gilbert Frankau stated that the reason why their mother "tacked the stage-famous 'Wyndham' onto the 'Ronald Hugh'" in Frankau's name was "obscure".

Frankau's siblings were Gilbert, Jack and Joan. Gilbert went into the family cigar business, living and working in Germany throughout 1902 to learn something of the trade. He continued in this career until the Great War; he was a war poet, and subsequently a novelist, while his daughter Pamela Frankau would also become a novelist. Jack was killed leading his platoon in the Third Battle of Gaza in November 1917. Joan married the historian Henry Stanley Bennett and, as a Cambridge don in her own right, she was one of the defence witnesses in the Lady Chatterley trial of 1960.

== Career ==
Frankau worked as a chorus boy at Daly's Theatre in London in 1911 and joined the army in 1914 to fight in the Great War. During that time he continued his musical and comedy ambitions, organising his own concerts in Africa and the United Kingdom.

After the war he worked in night clubs and hotel lounges as an entertainer in both comical song and dance. It was here that he met performer Montë Crick, who became Frankau's pianist in many subsequent performances and recordings. Ronald Frankau formed various concert parties in the early 1920s, of which the most successful was The Cabaret Kittens.

In 1925, he started broadcasting saucy jokes on the radio in an Etonian tone for the BBC, but is perhaps better known today for what he was not allowed to broadcast. Frankau recorded a number of songs and skits on Parlophone, some of which, like "Winnie the Worm" and "Everyone's Got Sex Appeal For Someone" (October 1933), were banned outright. Despite, or because of, this flavour in his songs, Frankau sold over 100,000 records in 1932. In 1934, Frankau began a comedy duo with Tommy Handley called 'Murgatroyd and Winterbottom'. The two had originally met performing in Liverpool before the Great War.

Like many comedians, he passed comment on current events of the time, often in satire. March 1939 saw his heavily ironic recording There's Absolutely Nothing Wrong at All. Among his many Second World War recordings were "Heil Hitler! Ja! Ja! Ja!" (October 1939), "Fanny's Been Evacuated Now" (October 1940) and "The Jap and the Wop and the Hun" (April 1942). Despite his risqué tone off air, he was able to keep his jokes clean enough for some of the toughest British broadcasting censors of the day, including Baron Reith.

In 1994, Jeremy Nicholas presented a programme on BBC Radio 2 to commemorate the centenary of Ronald Frankau's birth, which included an original July 1940 gramophone record of "Uncle Bill Has Much Improved", still bearing its BBC label: "NOT TO BE BROADCAST UNDER ANY CIRCUMSTANCES". On 7 November 2006, BBC Radio 4 broadcast a review of one of his acts – "Mr Murgatroyd and Mr Winterbottom" – 'The story of Tommy Handley and Ronald Frankau, a comedy partnership which had its heyday in the 1930s world of radio. There was no straight man, so the partnership was considered a rare one. Tommy was a fast talking Liverpudlian, while Ronald in contrast was upper class and Eton-educated. Presented by Nicholas Frankau, actor and grandson of Ronald.' BBC - (none) - Arts and Drama - Mr Murgatroyd and Mr Winterbottom

Ronald Frankau died at Eastbourne on the Sussex coast – as had his father half a century before.

== Books ==
Frankau published a children's book, Oh, Dear, Dear (Frederick Warne & Co., 1929), poems from which were also set to music by his pianist Montë Crick and released on Parlophone.

If you'd like to hear a story of many years ago,

Then gather round, good children, and I'll tell you all I know. It's all about a princess who couldn't quite behave, And how a naughty ogre took that princess to his cave, And how the little princess was rescued by a prince, And how they've been so very very happy ever since.

Extraordinary! Wonderful! Fascinating! Queer! Marvellous! Incredible!

Oh dear, dear!

His other publications include Crazy Omnibus (Grayson & Grayson, 1933), and two wartime books of morale-boosting humorous verse, both illustrated by Laurie Tayler and published in the early 1940s by Raphael Tuck & Sons: Diversion and He's a Perfect Little Gentleman, the Swine.

== Personal life and death ==
Frankau had several children, including TV producer John Frankau, the father of Nicholas Frankau. Ronald had two children with the actress Renée Roberts, Roberta and Rosemary. Rosemary Frankau pursued a career in acting, appearing in the TV sitcom Terry and June as June's best friend Beattie. Rosemary's son, Sam Bain, became a comedy writer, and co-created the Channel 4 sitcom Peep Show.

Ronald Frankau died on 11 September 1951, aged 57. The Frankau family monument in Hampstead Cemetery, which includes Ronald, was Grade II listed by English Heritage in 1999; it commemorates Arthur and Julia Frankau and their three sons.

=== Filmography ===
- (1931) Let's Love and Laugh
- (1931) The Skin Game
- (1931) Potiphar's Wife
- (1932) The Other Mrs. Phipps
- (1932) Let's Love and Laugh
- (1934) Radio Parade of 1935
- (1939) His Brother's Keeper
- (1942) Much Too Shy (credited as screenwriter)
- (1946) What Do We Do Now?
- (1947) The Ghosts of Berkeley Square
- (1947) Dual Alibi
