= Sam Bain =

British comedy writer

- Born: 3 August 1971 (age 54)
- Occupation: Screenwriter
- Known for: Peep Show
- Spouse: Wendy Bain
- Parents: Bill Bain (father); Rosemary Frankau (mother)
- Relatives: Ronald Frankau (grandfather); Renee Roberts (grandmother); Julia Davis (great-grandmother); Pamela Frankau (cousin); Nicholas Frankau (cousin)

Sam Bain (born 3 August 1971) is a British comedy writer, best known for the Channel 4 sitcom Peep Show. He attended St Paul's School in London before graduating from the University of Manchester, where he met his writing partner Jesse Armstrong.

== Early life and education ==
Bain's father was TV director Bill Bain and his mother, Rosemary Frankau, co-starred in the sitcom Terry and June. Through his mother, Bain is related to a long line of noted British comedians and writers, including his grandfather Ronald Frankau, his grandmother Renee Roberts, his great-grandmother Julia Davis, and cousins Pamela Frankau and Nicholas Frankau. He was educated at St Paul's School, where he was a classmate of future Chancellor George Osborne.

== Career ==
=== Collaborations with Jesse Armstrong ===
At the beginning of their writing career, Bain and Armstrong wrote for the Channel 4 sketch show Smack the Pony and the children's shows The Queen's Nose and My Parents Are Aliens. They went on to create and write Peep Show, BBC One sitcom The Old Guys, and most recently Channel 4 comedy-dramas Fresh Meat and Babylon. They also wrote for the Radio Four sketch show That Mitchell and Webb Sound, starring Peep Show's two main actors David Mitchell and Robert Webb, and its BBC Two adaptation That Mitchell and Webb Look. Peep Show has won several writing awards, including a BAFTA for Best Situation Comedy in 2008.

To date, Bain and Armstrong have written two films together — the 2007 comedy Magicians, and, alongside Chris Morris, the 2010 terrorism satire Four Lions.

Bain and Armstrong received the Writers' Guild of Great Britain Award at the British Comedy Awards 2010. In 2012 both Bain and Armstrong were featured on the TV industry journal Broadcast's 'Hot 100' list, highlighting the most successful people in UK television.

In 2012 Bain and Armstrong wrote the Channel 4 comedy pilot Bad Sugar, a spoof of Dynasty-style soap operas, which starred Olivia Colman, Julia Davis and Sharon Horgan, all of whom also co-conceived the show.

=== Other writing ===
Bain wrote the novel Yours Truly, Pierre Stone, which was published by IMP Fiction in 2002.

Bain provided additional material for episode one of the BBC Four political satire The Thick of It, and was the script editor for the second series of BBC2 sitcom Rev.

In 2017, the black comedy Ill Behaviour, his first television series written solo, screened on BBC2 and Showtime.

In 2018, Bain was hired to write the spy action-comedy No Glory by Valparaiso Pictures & Gary Sanchez Productions. Kumail Nanjiani is attached to star.

== Personal life ==
Bain is married to actress/screenwriter Wendy Bain.
