= Frank (surname) =

Frank is a German surname. Notable persons with the surname include:

== In art ==
- Alyce Frank (1932–2024), American artist
- Jane Frank (1918–1986), American artist
- Jean-Michel Frank (1895–1941), French furniture and interior designer
- Leonard Frank (1870–1944), German-Canadian photographer
- Magda Frank (1914–2010), Hungarian-Argentine sculptor
- Mary Frank (born 1933), American artist
- Regina Frank (born 1965), German textile artist
- Robert Frank (1924–2019), American photographer

== In entertainment ==
- Alan Frank (1910–1994), music publisher, clarinetist, composer
- Amber Frank (born 1998), American actress
- Astrid Frank (born 1945), German actress
- Bob Frank (1944–2019), American musician, singer, songwriter
- Forrest Frank (born 1995), American singer, songwriter, and producer
- Horst Frank (1929-1999), German actor
- Jackson C. Frank (1943–1999), American folk musician
- Jason David Frank (1973–2022), American actor
- Tony Frank (1943–2000), American actor
- Ulrike Frank (born 1969), German actress

== In literature ==
- Anne Frank (1929–1945), author of a diary during World War II
  - Edith Frank (1900–1945), mother of Anne Frank
  - Margot Frank (1926–1945), sister of Anne Frank
  - Otto Frank (1889–1980), father of Anne Frank and posthumous editor of her works
- Bernard Frank (1929–2006), French journalist and writer
- Bruno Frank (1878–1945), German author, poet, dramatist and humanist
- Dan Frank (1954–2021), American editorial director at Pantheon Books
- Leonhard Frank (1882–1961), German writer
- Nathaniel Frank (fl. 2000s), American author and historian
- Waldo Frank (1889–1967), American author and scholar
- Thomas Frank (born 1965), American political analyst, historian, and writer

== In military ==
- Bernhard Frank (1913–2011), German SS Commander
- Hans Frank (1900–1946), governor general of Nazi-occupied Poland
- Hans-Dieter Frank (1919–1943), German fighter pilot
- Johann Frank (general) (born 1969) is an officer of the Austrian Armed Forces and political scientist
- Karl Hermann Frank (1898–1946), Sudeten-German Nazi official in Czechoslovakia
- Rudolf Frank (1920–1944), German fighter pilot

== In politics ==
- Barney Frank (1940–2026), American politician, Massachusetts Democratic congressperson
- Donald J. Frank (1937–1995), American politician from Minnesota
- Ivo Frank (1877–1939), Croatian lawyer and politician
- James Frank (born 1966), American politician, Republican member of the Texas House of Representatives from Wichita Falls
- Josip Frank (1844–1911), Croatian lawyer and politician of Jewish descent
- Michael Frank (1804–1894), American politician from Wisconsin
- William J. Frank (born 1960), American politician, Maryland Republican state congressperson from 2003 to 2015

== In science ==
- Adolph Frank (1834–1916), German chemist
- Albert Bernhard Frank (1839–1900), German biologist
- András Frank (born 1949), Hungarian mathematician
- Charles Frank (1911–1998), British physicist, crystallographer
- Dawn Frank, American biologist and academic administrator
- Joachim Frank (born 1940), German-American biophysicist and Nobel laureate
- Johann Peter Frank (1745–1821), German physician and hygienist
- Ilya Frank (1908–1990), physicist and 1958 Nobel laureate
- Philipp Frank (1884–1966), physicist, mathematician and philosopher
- Dr. Nicholas Frank, English-American Veterinarian and Dean of Mississippi State University College of Veterinary Medicine
- Amelia Frank (1906-1937), physicist

== In sports ==
- Ethen Frank (born 1998), American ice hockey player
- John Frank (tight end) (born 1962), American NFL football player
- Leo J. Frank (1895–1961), American college football player and coach
- Romar Frank (born 1996), Grenadian footballer
- Thomas Frank (football manager) (born 1973), Danish football manager
- Tommy Frank (born 1993), British boxer
- Wolfgang Frank (1951–2013), German footballer and manager

== Other ==
- Andre Gunder Frank (1929–2005), German-American sociologist known as a founder of dependency theory
- Antoinette Frank (born 1971), American former New Orleans police officer and convicted triple murderer
- Bernard Frank (wilderness activist) (1902–1964), wilderness activist and co-founder of The Wilderness Society
- Donovan W. Frank (born 1951), American judge
- Eugene Maxwell Frank (1907–2009), American Bishop of the Methodist and United Methodist Churches
- Eve Frank (1754–1816/1817), female Jewish messiah claimant
- Harriet Frank Jr. (1923–2020), American screenwriter and film producer
- Helmar Frank (1933–2013), German mathematician and educator
- Henry Frank (1851–1908), Montana entrepreneur
- Jacob Frank (1726–1791), Polish founder of a Jewish dissident sect
- Jerome Frank (1889–1957), American legal philosopher and judge
- Joe Frank (1938–2018), American writer, teacher, and radio performer
- Katherine Frank (anthropologist), American anthropologist
- Katherine Frank (biographer), American biographer
- Katherine P. Frank, American literary critic
- Leo Frank (1884–1915), man convicted of murdering a 13-year-old girl in Georgia
- Lisa Frank (born 1955), American businesswoman
- Neil Frank (1931–2025), American meteorologist
- Peter Frank (academic) (1934–2013), British professor and media commentator
- Peter Frank (art critic) (born 1950), art critic, curator, and poet
- Ray Frank (1861–1948), female Jewish religious leader
- Robert Frank (1924–2019), photographer
- Robert H. Frank (born 1945), economist
- Semyon Frank, (1877–1950) Russian philosopher
- Peirson Frank (1881–1951), British civil engineer
- Ulrich Frank (born 1958), German computer scientist

== See also ==
- Francis (given name)
- Franck (disambiguation)
- Francke
- Frankau (surname)
- Franke
- Frankel
- Frankl
