= The Love Story of Aliette Brunton =

The Love Story of Aliette Brunton may refer to:

- The Love Story of Aliette Brunton (novel), a 1922 novel by Gilbert Frankau
- The Love Story of Aliette Brunton (film), a 1924 British silent film based on the novel
