= Aliette =

Aliette is a feminine given name. Notable people with the name include:

- Aliette de Bodard (born 1982), French-American speculative fiction writer
- Aliette Opheim (born 1985), Swedish actress

== See also ==
- The Love Story of Aliette Brunton (film), 1924 British film
- The Love Story of Aliette Brunton (novel), 1922 novel by Gilbert Frankau
