= Claude Frankau =

British surgeon (1883–1967)

Sir Claude Howard Stanley Frankau CBE DSO FRCS (11 February 1883 – 29 June 1967) was a distinguished British surgeon long associated with St George’s Hospital. In 1937 he was President of the Association of Surgeons of Great Britain and Ireland

Claude Frankau was the younger son of London barrister Frederick Joseph "Fritz" Frankau (1855–1933), and thus grandson of Adolph Frankau (1821–1860), a successful importer of smokers' requisites and founder of the pipe-manufacturing firm Adolph Frankau & Co. One of Adolph's nephews was the businessman Arthur Frankau whose wife Julia Frankau and son Gilbert Frankau became well-known novelists.

Like his father and brother, Claude attended Rugby School. His medical training was at St George’s Hospital Medical School.

In the First World War Frankau served in France and was awarded the DSO in 1918, CBE in 1919. In the Second World War he was director of the Emergency Medical Service for London and the Home Counties and he was knighted in the 1945 New Year Honours.

Frankau was married twice. In 1914 he married Edith Lorne MacDougall by whom he had two sons and a daughter. Edith died in 1934. His second wife was psychiatrist Dr Isabella Robertson.
