= Murgatroyd and Winterbottom =

Feature of BBC radio

The comedy act Mr Murgatroyd and Mr Winterbottom ("Two minds with not a single thought") was a popular feature of BBC radio in the 1930s and 1940s. It was written and performed by Ronald Frankau (Murgatroyd) and Tommy Handley.

Handley's biographer Barry Took describes the act as "a sophisticated crosstalk of quickfire word and idea association"; the combination of the Old Etonian Frankau's patrician tones as Murgatroyd and Handley's fast-talking Scouse patter, as Winterbottom became one of the BBC's most popular comedy features. Took quotes a typical example of Murgatroyd and Winterbottom's rapid cross-talk:

Murgatroyd: How are you, Mr Winterbottom?
Winterbottom: I feel a bit funny.
Murgatroyd: Only a bit? Oh, I feel frightfully funny.
Winterbottom: Well, it ought to be a good act tonight.
Murgatroyd: It won't be appreciated by the audience in the studio.
Winterbottom: Why not?
Murgatroyd: Well, look at them – there's a fellow there eating a bit of cheese.
Winterbottom: Yes, he got in on the strength of that. They certainly don't look an intelligent lot.
Murgatroyd: No, obviously friends of the producer; but we must think of the listener.
Winterbottom: I'm thinking of her. There won't half be a row when I get home.
Murgatroyd: Why?
Winterbottom: I threw a shoe at her.
Murgatroyd: It isn't June yet.
Winterbottom: What's that got to do with it?
Murgatroyd: Ne'er cast a clout till May is out. Yes, Mr Winterbottom, we must always study the listener – the Mr and Mrs Everymans
Winterbottom: The Jones and Smiths.
Murgatroyd: The Robinsons and Browns.
Winterbottom: The Gilbert and Sullivans.
Murgatroyd: The Tristan and Isoldes.
Winterbottom: The Hengists and Horsas.
Murgatroyd: The Moodys and Sankeys.
Winterbottom: And the Darbys and Joans.
Murgatroyd: Cut out the Joans and let's think of the Derby. What have you backed?
Winterbottom: My car into a shop window. Joan a car?
Murgatroyd: Cut out the Joan and let's think of the Derby again.

Murgatroyd and Winterbottom became so popular that the performers' wives – Jean Allistone and Renee Roberts – were invited to make several broadcasts of their own as "Mrs Murgatroyd and Mrs Winterbottom". Frankau and Handley made more than 50 broadcasts as Murgatroyd and Winterbottom between 1935 and 1948.

== Sources ==
- Took, Barry (1998). Laughter in the Air: An Informal History of British Radio Comedy. London: Robson Books. ISBN 978-0-903895-78-1.
