= Eliza Davis =

English fashion journalist, editor and socialite (1866–1931)

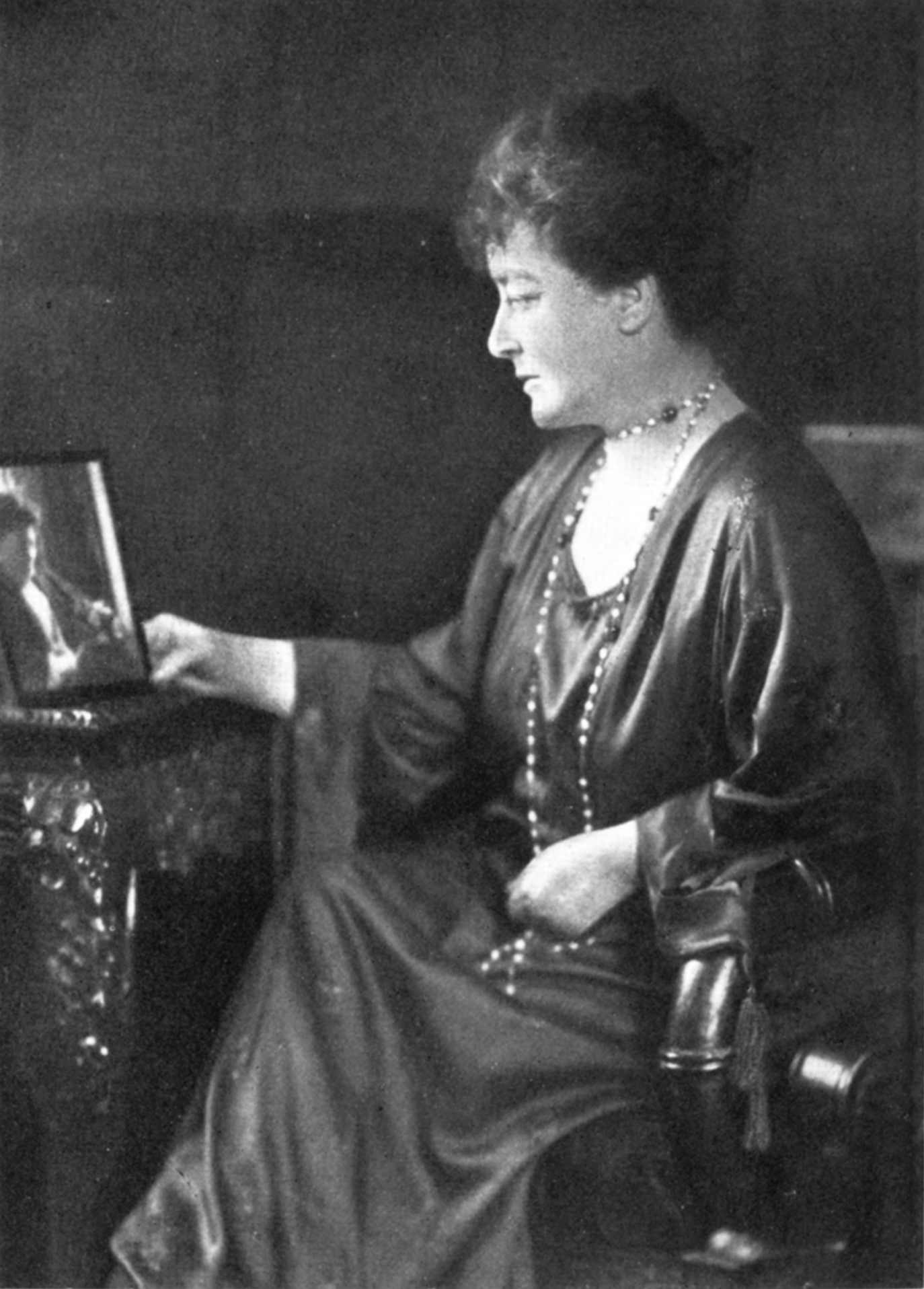
- Davis c. 1918
- Born: Eliza Davis; 1 August 1866; London, England
- Died: 3 September 1931 (aged 65); Adelphi Theatre, London, England
- Occupations: Writer; fashion journalist; editor; socialite; literary salonnière
- Spouse: David Bonito Aria (m. 1884; sep. 1889)
- Partner: Henry Irving
- Children: 1
- Relatives: Owen Hall (brother); Julia Frankau (sister); Arthur Frankau (brother-in-law); Gilbert Frankau (nephew); Ronald Frankau (nephew); Joan Bennett (nephew)
- Writing career
- Pen name: Mrs Aria

Eliza Davis Aria (née Davis; 11 August 1866 – 3 September 1931), known by the pen name Mrs Aria, was an English writer, fashion journalist, editor, socialite and literary salonnière, known for her weekly column ‘Mrs A.'s diary’. Davis is also known for being long-term lover of Henry Irving, from the 1890s until his death in 1905.

== Early life ==
Eliza Davis was born in London on 11 August 1866 to portrait photographer Hyman Davis and his wife Isabella (Bella). She spent her early years in the house attached to her father's Bruton Street, Mayfair studio. She attended Miss Belisario's school and was afterward tutored by Madame Paul Lafargue, the daughter of Karl Marx.

Eliza's seven siblings included several writers: novelist and art historian Julia Frankau (pseudonym Frank Danby) and their eldest brother James (pseudonym Owen Hall), a racing correspondent, theatre critic, and librettist. "While James was still living at home, he brought to the house literary and theatrical figures, including Oscar and Willie Wilde, who would play tennis in a nearby public garden with Julia and Eliza." A younger sister, Florence Collins, published one novel, The Luddingtons (Heinemann 1905), about which Mrs Aria had this to say: "'You are the beauty of the family,' we advised her, and she accepted the verdict as condemning the volume to solitude." Her nephew Gilbert Frankau became a journalist and novelist, and Gilbert's younger brother Ronald Frankau went on the stage.

== Marriage and career ==
In 1884, Eliza married Jamaican-born merchant David Bonito Aria, and gave birth to their daughter the following year, but there was "little of real love between" the couple, and his precarious finances proved a poor match for her view of luxuries as "the absolute necessities of existence," leading to a permanent separation with David Aria's departure for South Africa after five years of marriage.

The separation served as a stimulus to her journalistic career. She became a prominent fashion columnist, eventually founding her own magazine, The World of Dress, which she edited from 1898 to 1908.

In 1898, she began an affair with prominent actor Henry Irving, which lasted until his death in 1905.

Mrs Aria's literary and artistic salon included H. G. Wells, Isidore de Lara, and C. R. W. Nevinson, who painted a view of Fitzroy Square from the window of her flat. Gilbert Frankau's novelist daughter Pamela recalled that Mrs Aria "was the friend of such gods as George Moore, Ivor Novello, Michael Arlen, Sybil Thorndike and Rebecca West. She sent her great-nieces a collection of autographs that looked like the Milky Way." Mrs Aria's sister Julia Frankau "was wont to say, 'Unless Eliza receives each morning four letters from leading actresses which commence "Dearest" she looks unhappy.'" "All celebrated people," commented Pamela Frankau, "were called 'Darling' by Aunt Eliza, and in her presence at least greeted one another by the same title. So much so that, leaving Buckingham Gate on one occasion, the copywriter said to a taxi-driver during controversy, 'I did hail you first, darling.'"

== Later life ==
On 3 September 1931, Eliza Aria went with actor Frank Vosper to attend the London opening night of the stage play Grand Hotel, and died at the Adelphi Theatre just before the curtain went up – "'Which is odd because I have often heard her say she would like to die in a theatre.'"

== Publications ==
- The May Book: compiled by Mrs Aria in aid of Charing Cross Hospital, Macmillan 1901
- Mrs Aria. Woman and the Motor Car: being the autobiography of an automobilist, Sidney Appleton 1906
- Mrs Aria. Costume - Fanciful, Historical, and Theatrical, Macmillan 1906
- Mrs Aria. My Sentimental Self, Chapman and Hall 1922
