= Frankl =

Frankl is a surname. Notable people with the surname include:

- Ludwig August Frankl von Hochwart (1810–1894), Austrian writer and philanthropist
- Michal Frankl (born 1974), Czech historian
- Nicholas Frankl (born 1971), British-Hungarian entrepreneur
- Paul Frankl (1878–1962), German art historian
- Paul T. Frankl (1886–1958), Austrian Art Deco furniture designer and maker, architect, painter, and writer
- Paulette Frankl (born 1937), American courtroom artist
- Peter Frankl (born 1935), British pianist
- Péter Frankl (born 1953), Hungarian mathematician
- Pinkus Frankl (1848–1887), German rabbi
- Spencer Frankl (c. 1933–2007), American dentist
- Viktor Frankl (1905–1997), Austrian psychiatrist and neurologist; founder of Logotherapy
- Wilhelm Frankl (1893–1917), German military aviator

== See also ==
- Frankel
- Fränkel
- Frank (surname)
