= Arthur Frankau =

Son of Joseph Frankau (1849–1904)

- Born: February 1849
- Died: 21 November 1904 (aged 55)
- Spouse: Julia Frankau
- Children: Gilbert Frankau, Ronald Frankau, Jack Frankau, Joan Frankau

Arthur Frankau (February 1849 – 21 November 1904) was the son of Bavarian-born Joseph Frankau (previously Frankenau), a Jewish merchant who moved to London from Frankfurt in 1837. Arthur ran the firm successfully, but suffered a bad shock from a breach of verbal trust with a major supplier, and he soon died, to be replaced as head of the firm by his 21-year-old son, the future novelist Gilbert Frankau.

== Family and business background ==
Based initially in London's Whitechapel, by the mid-1840s Joseph Frankau had successfully established himself as an importer of leeches and cigars, trading as J. Frankau & Co. Meanwhile, Joseph's younger brothers Nathan and Adolph Frankau had emigrated from Germany to the U.S.A. where they set up a dry goods business.

Nathan Frankau remained in the U.S., establishing himself successfully as an importer and retailer of fancy goods, first in New Haven CT and later in New York NY: "Every piece of merchandise in his shop was bought by him because he thought it was fine." Adolph left New Haven for London (England), and started a business (Adolph Frankau & Co.) which later became known as a leading supplier of briar pipes such as the BBB brand. Their younger brothers Sidney and Henry Frankau also came to London, Sidney trading in partnership with Adolph in the early 1850s before starting his own firm (Sidney Frankau & Co.), again importing pipes and fancy goods. Henry appears as a member of Joseph Frankau's household, employed as a clerk at Joseph's firm, in the 1851 Census, by which time Joseph and his family had left Whitechapel for a home in the more salubrious surroundings of Duncan Terrace, Islington. Arthur Frankau, born at 22 Great Alie Street in February 1849, was to be the last of Joseph's children whose birth was registered in the Whitechapel District: his younger sister Alice was born in Islington in 1852, and younger brother Edwin in Hampstead in 1854. In the mid-1850s, Joseph and Adolph Frankau and their families, and Sidney Frankau, all resided in Hampstead. Arthur Frankau and his generation were cousins of New York actor Joseph Frankau, who was one of Nathan Frankau's children.

== Arthur Frankau at J. Frankau & Co. ==
J. Frankau & Co., with its head office at 30 Gracechurch Street (London EC), was to remain a family business for three-quarters of a century. Arthur Frankau's eldest sister Delia married the firm's managing clerk Joseph Grunbaum in 1868. Arthur's cousin Frances Frankau, eldest daughter of his uncle Henry Frankau, was to marry managing clerk E. H. Musgrave in 1883, by which time Arthur Frankau and Joseph Grunbaum were partners in the firm, along with Arthur's younger brother Edwin Frankau.

Arthur Frankau too married in 1883. His bride was Julia Davis, daughter of portrait photographer Hyman Davis, and later to become well known in her own right as author Frank Danby. They lived first at 103 Gloucester Terrace (London W), where their eldest son Gilbert Frankau was born in 1884, before moving to 32a Weymouth Street in the later 1880s. There, their two younger sons, Paul (known as Jack) and Ronald Frankau, were born in 1890 and 1894 respectively, as was their daughter Aline (1896–1986), known as Joan. American costume designer Aline Bernstein recalled staying at Arthur and Julia Frankau's house when her father, the New York actor Joseph Frankau (who was Frankau's first cousin) was performing in London: "It was a perfect Georgian house, everything in it had beauty and order; the design of the furniture, the chintz, the arrangement of flowers, the way food was passed at table, and the tea service. It was brilliantly clean, the silver and old woods looked as though they not only had just been polished, but had been polished for hundreds of years." She also remembered that Arthur and Julia's children "all lived upstairs like a separate little family, almost like a lot of little lepers, it seemed to me."

In 1903, the death of Edwin Frankau and the success of Frank Danby's latest novel, Pigs in Clover, provided Arthur and Julia Frankau with the means to move house once more, to 11 Clarges Street (Mayfair), and to acquire a holiday home on the Sussex coast named Clover Cottage (now No. 13 South Cliff, Eastbourne). "But my father had no zest for the Mayfair game," recalled his son Gilbert. Arthur Frankau "was very much the model of the self-denying, hard-working, family-oriented, successful Jewish businessman of popular legend." "I naturally came to know Arthur Frankau well," recalled his wife's friend and fellow-writer Marie Belloc Lowndes. "He had the cultivated, reserved manner which in those days was common in a type of German with whom I had come in contact, oddly enough, in Paris."

By long-established verbal understanding, J. Frankau & Co. were the sole U.K. importers of Upmann cigars, which had been to the advantage of both parties. But this unwritten agreement was broken by the Upmanns in 1901: "If ever one man’s lies shortened another man’s life, they were Heinrich Upmann’s lies to my father," wrote Gilbert Frankau. "The shock of learning that his trusted associates had no conception of business honour turned his iron-grey hair nearly white. He was a sick man – with his only surviving partner, his brother-in-law Joseph Grunbaum ("Uncle G."), now a widower, verging on seventy. In imagination, he saw the business ruined. 'What a bloomer,’ he used to say. 'My God, what a bloomer. I backed the wrong horse.'"

== Death and disaster ==
Arthur Frankau died at Clover Cottage, Eastbourne, on 21 November 1904 from galloping consumption apparently contracted on a business trip to Havana. "When he died, it was found that he had left his wife everything he possessed – including his great business – in a one-line will." His widow Julia commissioned a substantial memorial from the celebrated sculptor and goldsmith Alfred Gilbert, at an agreed price of six hundred guineas; substantial amounts of money changed hands, but no monument was ever forthcoming from Alfred Gilbert, and 1906 saw Julia Frankau and her sister Eliza (the gossip columnist "Mrs Aria") whipping up a considerable media campaign against him. The Frankau family memorial eventually erected in Hampstead Cemetery is in every sense a monumental piece of Art-Deco, Grade II listed by English Heritage in 1999 and possibly the work of Julia and Eliza's brother-in-law, London architect Marcus Collins (who was married to their eldest sister Florette).

J. Frankau & Co. became a Limited Company in 1905, Arthur's eldest son Gilbert (just 21 years of age) taking the position of Managing Director, but with his brother-in-law Joseph Grunbaum ("Uncle G.") and cousin Fritz Frankau on the Board in a supervisory capacity. Within a few years Joseph Grunbaum died and Gilbert Frankau invested heavily in a cigarette-making concern, W. Sandorides & Co., to launch a new cigarette brand, Lucana. The profits of J. Frankau & Co. were swallowed up by Gilbert's loss-making Lucana cigarette venture, prompting Fritz Frankau to resign from the Board.

At the beginning of 1914, Gilbert Frankau successfully renegotiated – in a written agreement – the family firm's sole U.K. agency for Upmann cigars which Arthur Frankau had been so horrified to lose in 1901, but war was shortly to supervene in August 1914, and both J. Frankau & Co. and W. Sandorides & Co. were sold following Julia Frankau's death in March 1916. Fritz Frankau would remain a Director of his own late father's firm, Adolph Frankau & Co., until April 1924, whereupon the Frankau family's business involvement in the tobacco trade finally ceased, nearly ninety years after Arthur Frankau's father first arrived in East London.

== Notes and references ==
=== Further reading ===
- Aryeh Newman, "From exile to exit: the Frankau Jewish connection", The Jewish Quarterly Vol. 34 No. 4 (128), 1987
- Todd M. Endelman, "The Frankaus of London: A Study in Radical Assimilation, 1837–1967", Jewish History Volume 8, Nos 1–2, 1994
- Iain Crawford, The Havana Cigar, Hunters & Frankau 1971
