= Farewell Romance =

1936 novel by Gilbert Frankau

- Author: Gilbert Frankau
- Language: English
- Genre: Romance
- Publication date: 1936
- Publication place: United Kingdom
- Media type: Print

Farewell Romance is a romance novel by the British writer Gilbert Frankau which was first published in 1936. It has been described as a "tear-jerker".

== Bibliography ==
- Angus McLaren. Reproduction by Design: Sex, Robots, Trees, and Test-Tube Babies in Interwar Britain. University of Chicago Press, 2012.
