= Rosemary Frankau =

British actress

- Born: 14 April 1933; Marylebone, London, England
- Died: 16 April 2017 (aged 84); Marylebone, London, England
- Occupation: Actress
- Spouses: Edward Fosh (m. 1953, divorced) Bill Bain (m. 1968; died 1982) Albert Bird (m. 1997; died 2001)
- Children: 2, including Sam Bain
- Parent(s): Ronald Frankau; Renee Roberts

Rosemary A. Frankau (14 April 1933 – 16 April 2017) was a British actress, born in Marylebone, London. She played Beattie Harris in nine series of the sitcom Terry and June between 1979 and 1987.

== Early life and career ==
Frankau was evacuated to Kent during the London Blitz, afterwards attending boarding school at Monkton Wyld in Dorset, her school fees being paid for by her aunt, the literary scholar Joan Bennett. She attended RADA and graduated from there in her 20s before going on to work in repertory theatre during the 1950s, working for Hazel Vincent Wallace at Leatherhead Theatre.

Frankau's first television appearance was in an episode of the BBC's Sunday Night Theatre (1954); she acted in Emergency-Ward 10 and The New Adventures of Charlie Chan, both in 1957. Other TV appearances include roles in The Man Who Finally Died (1959), No Hiding Place (1962), Six Shades of Black (1965), You Can't Win (1966), Intrigue (1966), Callan (1967), The Dustbinmen (1970), General Hospital (1973–75), Within These Walls (1975), Robin's Nest (1977), The Duchess of Duke Street (1977), Yes Minister (1981), I Remember Nelson (1982), Nobody's Hero (1982), The Cleopatras (1983), Mitch (1984), No Place Like Home (1984–86), Terry and June (1979-1987), Bergerac (1987), Boon (1990), 2point4 Children (1993), and Big Women (1998).

Film appearances include The Wind of Change (1961) and Ladybird Ladybird (1994).

A former member of the Royal Shakespeare Company, Frankau played Hippolyta in A Midsummer Night's Dream in 1962 at the Royal Shakespeare Theatre. The play was directed by Peter Hall and starred Judi Dench and Ian Richardson.

== Family life ==
Frankau's grandfather was Arthur Frankau, son of Joseph Frankau, a German Jew who came to London from Frankfurt in the late 1830s and started a cigar trading business. Arthur Frankau married Julia Davis, who was a novelist of satirical books. Some of her titles are Pigs in Clover and An Incomplete Etonian.

Her father was the actor Ronald Frankau, and her mother the actress Renee Roberts who played Miss Gatsby in Fawlty Towers. Her uncle Gilbert went into the family trading business until the war (living and working for a while in Germany). He was also a war poet and subsequently a novelist. Her half-brother is the TV producer John Frankau, father of the actor Nicholas Frankau. She also has a sister, Roberta.

The Frankau Family monument in Hampstead Cemetery is monumental in every sense of the word; Grade II listed by English Heritage in 1999, it commemorates Arthur and Julia Frankau and their three sons.

Frankau first married Edward J. Fosh in 1953. They had no children and the marriage was later dissolved. In 1968 she married Bill Bain (died in 1982), an Australian-born TV director. They had two sons, Matthew (born 1969) and Sam Bain, a comedy writer who co-created Peep Show. She married Albert D. Bird in 1997 and the couple lived in Kent.
