= Attilio Comelli =

Design by Comelli for Carmen, 1903

Attilio Comelli (1858 – 8 September 1925), born Attilio Giuseppe de Comelli von Stuckenfeld, was an Italian costume designer of wealthy ancestry who moved to London in the late 19th century. He quickly established himself as one of the most prolific designers for the London stage and worked as artist in chief at both the Alhambra Theatre and the Theatre Royal, Drury Lane, and also produced designs for two of the Savoy operas. In the 1890s he was appointed house designer to the Royal Opera House and was responsible for providing the costumes for the first London performances of many operas including major works by Wagner and Puccini.

== Life and career ==
Comelli was born in Gradisca d'Isonzo, in north-east Italy (at that time part of the Austro-Hungarian Empire), the eldest of the six children of Federico de Comelli von Stuckenfeld, a prosperous architect. According to the Royal Opera House archives, Comelli's siblings may have included Emilio Andrea Comelli, a costume maker or designer active in London during the early 20th century. Comelli told a journalist in 1902, "When I get the order to prepare designs for a new play ... I first spend some weeks in studying ... every available authority on the period, and I frequently send my brother to Paris and Berlin, if there is a chance of getting information there that is not available in London". The Royal Opera House archivist conjectures that this was Andrea.

After working in his father's office Comelli moved to Paris where he quickly found work designing for several theatres. From there he moved to London where Augustus Harris engaged him for a single production and was so impressed that he prevailed on him to remain in London and design for productions at the Theatre Royal, Drury Lane. He continued to do so for more than thirty years; after Arthur Collins succeeded Harris, Comelli continued to design for the house. A press report in 1925 said that he was known in particular for creating the costumes for annual pantomimes:

It was a "harvest" ballet one year and a "flowers" spectacle the next; girls dancing as sea shells would follow a year later. Whenever a fairy queen was seen surrounded by attendant nymphs …she wore Comelli's clothes.

Comelli married Cecilia Emily Middleton on 16 August 1900. He was 42 and she was 29, the daughter of John William Middleton, a physician. They lived in South Hampstead, London. They are not known to have had children.

In 1915 Rupert D'Oyly Carte commissioned designs from Comelli for the fairies' costumes for a new production of Iolanthe and in 1919 all the costumes for a revival of The Sorcerer. During his time designing for the Royal Opera House, Comelli was responsible for the costumes for the first London performances of many operas, including La bohème (1899), Madama Butterfly (1905), La fanciulla del West (1911) and Parsifal (1914). His designs for La bohème remained in use until 1974. The Royal Ballet and Opera collections department has 1,408 Comelli designs for 78 opera and ballet productions of works including Aida, Andrea Chénier, Carmen, Die Walküre, Elektra, Faust, Le nozze di Figaro, Otello, Salome and La traviata.

Comelli was a stickler for historical and geographical accuracy in his costumes. In 1911 he told a reporter:

If you are going to present the Russian moujik or the Italian peasant, do not attempt to idealise their costumes. Set them down correct to a detail. Never mind that ugly tuft on the headgear, nor that too narrow strip of white for a petticoat. Give us the details as they exist. … I do not want to present you with a Comelli design. I want to present you with a Hungarian loiterer just as I find him.

He added, "Similarly I thoroughly object to the dressing up of a woman as a boy. The figure in each case is distinct, and you cannot merge one in the other. Moreover, as soon as ever you begin making a boy of a girl you begin to idealise the costume, sacrificing reality to prettiness". An obituarist wrote in 1925:

Comelli was a master of colour harmonies. His great secret was his power of being able mentally to visualise the effect of the ensemble … his skill and artistry were invariably unerring. He made greater use of yellow, sulphur, sap green and pale pastel shades probably than any other designer, and his creations always bore the hallmark of his subtle, distinctive touch.

Comelli died on 8 September 1925 at the West London Hospital in Hammersmith, and was survived by his wife, who lived until 1963. His designs are to be found in many of the major theatre collections, including the Royal Ballet and Opera Collection, the Victoria and Albert Museum, London, the Harry Ransome Research Center at the University of Texas at Austin, and the Performing Arts Collection at the Arts Centre in Melbourne.

== Sources ==
- Rollins, Cyril; R. John Witts (1962). The D'Oyly Carte Opera Company in Gilbert and Sullivan Operas: A Record of Productions, 1875–1961. London: Michael Joseph. OCLC 504581419.
