= John Petro =

Early 20th century Polish-English physician who distributed prescription drugs freely

The chemical structure of heroin

John Petro was a doctor who gained notoriety for prescribing controlled drugs in 1960s Britain.

Petro was one of the first doctors to administer penicillin with Alexander Fleming. In 1966, he was injured in a traffic collision and faced bankruptcy, resorting to writing prescriptions to drug addicts for controlled drugs such as heroin and cocaine. Petro did not have an office and worked out of coffee bars and cafes. His practice was widely covered by British tabloids for months. In January 1968, Petro was invited on David Frost's television program to discuss his practice. He was immediately arrested after the broadcast.

In 1968, his name was struck off of the Medical Register. Petro continued working with drug addicts after no longer being able to prescribe drugs.

Petro was discussed in the House of Commons by Alexander Lyon, Edward Short, and Cranley Onslow during a debate about trial by television.

== See also ==
- Isabella Frankau
