= Humbert Wolfe =

Italian-British poet, intellectual and civil servant (1885–1940)

Humbert Wolfe CB CBE
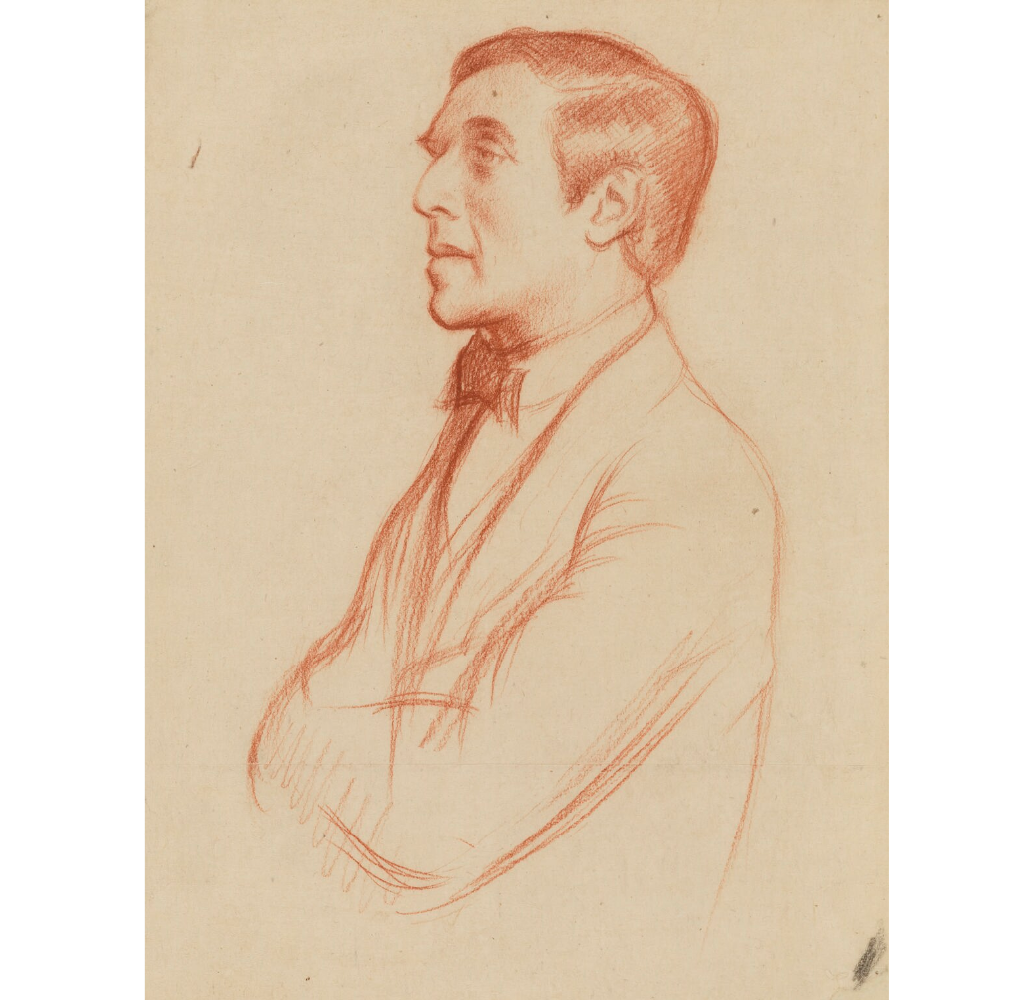
- Drawing by William Rothenstein, 1931
- Born: 5 January 1885; Milan, Kingdom of Italy
- Died: 5 January 1940 (aged 55)
- Education: Wadham College, Oxford
- Partner: Pamela Frankau
- Writing career
- Notable work: The Uncelestial City

Humbert Wolfe CB CBE (5 January 1885 – 5 January 1940) was an Italian-born British poet, man of letters and civil servant.

Humbert Wolfe was one of the most popular British authors of the 1920s. He was also a translator of Heinrich Heine, Edmond Fleg (1874–1963) and Eugene Heltai (Heltai Jenő). A Christian convert, he remained very aware of his Jewish heritage.

== Early life ==
Humbert Wolfe was born in Milan, Italy, and came from a Jewish family background, his father, Martin Wolff, being of German descent and his mother, Consuela, née Terraccini, Italian. He was brought up in Bradford, West Riding of Yorkshire and was a pupil at Bradford Grammar School. Wolfe attended Wadham College at the University of Oxford.

== Career ==
His career was in the Civil Service, beginning in 1908 when he joined the Board of Trade. He was involved in forming the Labour Department which subsequently grew into the Ministry of Labour. He was often involved in arbitrating in labour disputes in order to prevent strikes. By 1940 he had a position of high responsibility. His work was recognised with appointment as a Commander of the Order of the British Empire (CBE) in the 1918 New Year Honours, and a Companion of the Order of the Bath (CB) in the 1925 Birthday Honours,

Wolfe said in an interview with Twentieth Century Authors that he was "of no political creed, except that his general view is that money and its possessors should be abolished."

Wolfe's verses have been set to music by a number of composers, including Gustav Holst in his 12 Humbert Wolfe Songs, Op. 48 (1929).

Though his works are little read today, the following epigram from The Uncelestial City continues to be widely known and quoted:

You cannot hope
to bribe or twist,
thank God! the
British journalist.
But, seeing what
the man will do
unbribed, there's
no occasion to.

== Personal life ==
In 1910, Wolfe married Jessie Chalmers; they had one daughter. He had a long-term affair with the novelist Pamela Frankau, while remaining married.

Wolfe died suddenly at his home near London on his 55th birthday.

== Legacy ==
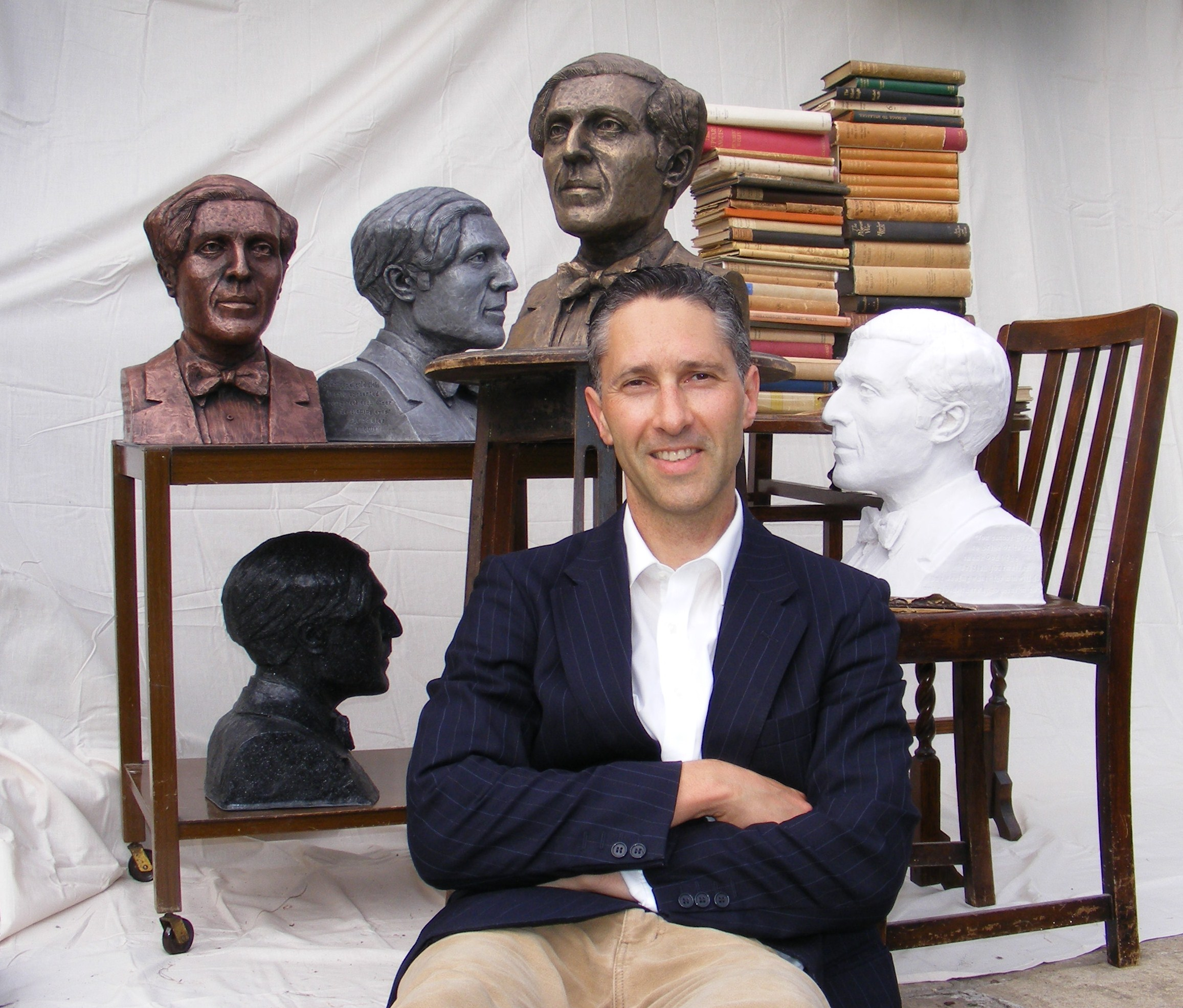
The 5 Heads of Humbert Wolfe by Anthony Padgett

In 2014–2015, five busts of the poet were created and sited by sculptor Anthony Padgett to mark the 75th anniversary of Wolfe's death. The sculptures have been sited where Wolfe died in London – 75 Eccleston Square, where he studied – Wadham College Oxford, where there is a collection of his manuscripts – New York Public Library and where he grew up – Bradford Library and Bradford Grammar School.

== Works ==
- London Sonnets (1920)
- Shylock Reasons with Mr. Chesterton and other poems (1920)
- Wolfe, Humbert (1922). "Labour Ministry and Department of Labour" . Encyclopædia Britannica. Vol. 31 (12th ed.). Please note that a wikilink to the author's article on [Labour Supply and Regulation] in [EB1922] is not available
- Circular Saws (1923)
- Labour Supply and Regulation (1923)
- The Lilac (1924)
- Lampoons (1925)
- The Unknown Goddess (1925) poems
- Humoresque (1926)
- News of the Devil (1926) poems
- Requiem (1927) poems
- Cursory Rhymes (1927) poems
- Others Abide (1927) translator, Ancient Greek poems
- Kensington Gardens (1924)
- Dialogues and Monologues (1928) criticism
- This Blind Rose (1928) poems
- Troy (1928) Faber & Gwyer, Ariel poems
- The Moon and Mrs. Misses Smith (1928)
- The Craft of Verse (1928) essay
- The Silver Cat and other poems (1928)
- Notes on English Verse Satire (1929)
- A Winter Miscellany (1930) editor, prose anthology, plus some original poems
- Homage to Meleager (1930 Limited Edition)
- Tennyson (1930) criticism of Maud
- The Uncelestial City (1930) poems
- Early Poems (1930)
- George Moore (1931) biography
- Snow (1931) poems
- Signpost to Poetry (1931)
- Reverie of Policeman: A ballet in three acts (1933)
- Now a Stranger (1933) autobiography
- Romantic and Unromantic Poetry (1933)
- Truffle Eater. Pretty Stories and funny pictures An anti-Nazi parody of the famous Struwwelpeter, published under the alias "Oistros", with pictures by Archibald Louis Charles Savory (1933)
- Portraits by Inference (1934) biographical sketches
- Sonnets pour Helene (by Ronsard) (1934) translator
- X at Oberammergau : A poem (1935) drama
- The Fourth of August (1935) poems
- Selected Lyrics of Heinrich Heine (1935) translator
- P. L. M.: Peoples Landfalls Mountains (1936)
- The Pilgrim's Way (1936)
- Personalities; a selection from the writings of A. A. Baumann (1936) editor, biographical sketches by Arthur A. Baumann
- The Silent Knight: A Romantic Comedy in Three Acts (by Eugene Heltai)(1937)
- Others Abide: Translated Greek Epigrams (1937)
- The Upward Anguish (1938) autobiography
- Out of Great Tribulation (1939) poems
- Kensington Gardens in War-Time (1940) poems
- Cyrano de Bergerac (1941) by Edmond Rostand translator
