= Arthur Collins (theatre manager) =

English playwright and theatre manager

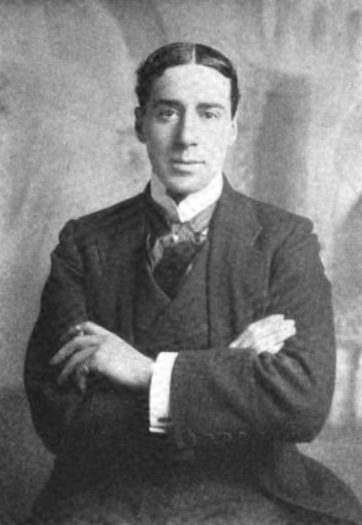
Collins in The Sketch, 1899

Arthur Pelham Collins (1864 – 15 January 1932) was an English playwright and theatre manager. He was perhaps best known for his many Christmas pantomimes produced at the Theatre Royal, Drury Lane, which he managed during the late Victorian and Edwardian era. Many of these were co-authored by Collins and J. Hickory Wood.

== Biography ==
=== Early life ===
Of Jewish heritage, Collins was born in London to the architect Hyman Henry Collins (1833–1905). Arthur was one of nine children; his younger brothers, Alphonse and Horace were both in the theatrical business with the former having had a brief music-hall career and Horace being a Press agent for the Drury Lane Theatre, later becoming Secretary of the Theatrical Managers' Association. Collins's youngest brother Frank was a stage director for Charles B. Cochran. Another of his brothers, Marcus Evelyn Collins, was a successful architect.

=== Career ===
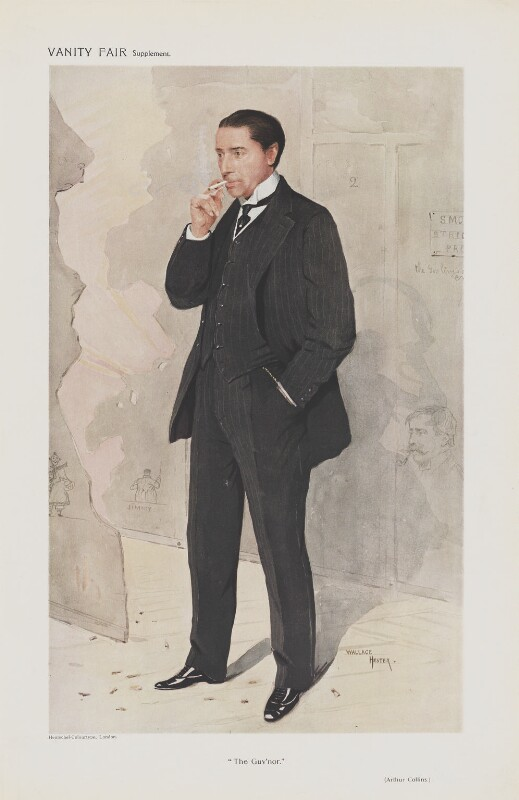
"The Guv'nor", caricature by Wallace Hester in Vanity Fair, 1910

Collins began his working life in a Holborn seedsman's shop before beginning an apprenticeship to Henry Emden, who was the scenic artist at Drury Lane Theatre, during the tenure of the impresario and dramatist Augustus Harris. From 1881, he was associated with the theatre continuously for 43 years. There he also learned from scene-painter William Beverley, whom he described as being "the most celebrated scenic artist of the day." Collins met the dramatist W. S. Gilbert, who directed his own plays; the meeting was, for Collins, "one of his pleasantest recollections. Gilbert always knew what he wanted. He would look at a scene model, point out defects and suggest alterations in a sympathetic manner."

Following the death of Augustus Harris in 1896, Collins became managing director of the Drury Lane Theatre, a post he held until 1924. Collins's brother Horace remembered that, after Harris died, Collins had at short notice to raise £1,000 "with which he took up the option on the lease. He then had to interview the Duke of Bedford's agent. It was the Duke's intention to pull down the historic building and use the site for a new potato market. There was a loud outcry in the Press against the destruction of the [theatre]. The agent was somewhat diffident about granting a long lease of the theatre to an inexperienced man of thirty-one, but Arthur overcame his objections and, probably impressed by the results of his management under Harris, he advised the Duke to grant Arthur a forty years' lease, which was subsequently extended to eighty." The first Drury Lane production under the proprietorship of Arthur Collins was a play called The White Heather, by Cecil Raleigh and Harry Hamilton, for which Collins invited his sister-in-law's sister, the fashion and society writer Eliza Davis, to assist in designing the costumes. She wrote, under her pen name "Mrs Aria": "There were no less than ninety frocks altogether".

Collins "superintended the first command performance [at Drury Lane] (in 1911), and signalled his surprise marriage to the beautiful Jette Thom of Los Angeles with the laconic cable from California, 'Bringing home winsome bride'." Mrs. Aria remembered that Collins enjoyed spending time in the country playing "croquet until it is time for billiards or bridge, and bridge or billiards until it is time for croquet again". Horace wrote:

[O]ut of the many productions at Drury Lane during Arthur's regime there was only one real failure. That was in 1923, the year before he retired, and the play was Angelo, adapted from the German by Louis N. Parker. [This was an extraordinarily complex and expensive production], and ... the stage was divided up into small compartments, to one or other of which, from time to time, the action was confined, leaving the rest of the vast stage in darkness. No doubt the spasmodic action and the slowness of the story had a good deal to do with the failure. It survived only twenty-nine performances.

Under Collins, Drury Lane was famous for its lavish annual pantomimes, with costumes by Atillio Comelli. One London paper reported, "It was a 'harvest' ballet one year and a 'flowers' spectacle the next; girls dancing as sea shells would follow a year later".

Collins died in January 1932.
