= Wallace Hester =

British artist (1866–1942)

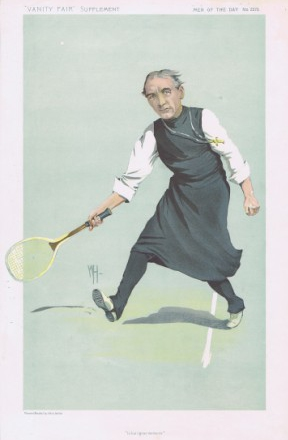
Caricature of the Bishop of London, Vanity Fair, 1912, by Wallace Hester

Robert Wallace Hester (1866 – 1942) was a British artist, engraver and caricaturist who made witty illustrations of famous people for Vanity Fair. He used the abbreviations and pseudonyms 'W. Hester', 'Hester', 'WH' and 'WH-'.

Wallace's father Edward Gilbert Hester was an engraver who worked in Chiswick, exhibiting at the Royal Academy from 1882 onwards. Edward taught Wallace the art of engraving. Wallace exhibited his work at the Salon des Artistes Français in Paris from 1905.

As well as caricatures, Hester made engravings of school buildings.

== Collections ==
- National Portrait Gallery (54 portraits)
- National Trust (2 paintings)
