= Isabella Frankau =

British psychiatrist (died 1967)

Dr Isabella McDougall Robertson (died May 1967), also known as Lady Frankau, was a British psychiatrist who specialised in alcohol and drug addiction and became known for prescribing controlled drugs.

== Biography ==
After the death of her first husband, Gordon Cunningham, she married the eminent surgeon Claude Frankau (1883–1967) in 1935. When her husband was knighted in the 1945 New Years Honours, Isabella Frankau became known as "Lady Frankau" in accordance with accepted usage.

As Dr Isabella Robertson, she was one of the first researchers at the Maudsley Hospital, initially working with Frederick Mott and Frederick Golla on the physical basis of psychoses. During the Second World War, she worked at Cambridge University's Psychological Laboratory on the use of dietary supplements to improve the physical performance of servicemen. In the early 1950s she researched the use of subconvulsive electroshock therapy treatment for alcoholism.

A London-based "society doctor", she became widely known in the 1960s as a prescriber of heroin. Her readiness to prescribe controlled drugs is credited with single-handedly addicting many British people. From evidence she gave to the Brain Committee, she said the total between 1958 and 1964 was just over 500. After Frankau's death in 1967, John Petro largely took over her practice as a prescriber to heroin addicts; he was struck off in 1968.
