= Marcus Evelyn Collins =

Marcus Evelyn Collins (1861–1944) was one of the nine sons and two daughters of London architect and City of London District Surveyor Hyman Henry Collins (1833–1905).

Noted buildings by H. H. Collins included a number of synagogues, such as the St John's Wood United Synagogue, the Chatham Memorial Synagogue, and the Park Row Synagogue, Bristol. H. H. Collins was also a staunch advocate of domestic sanitation for all classes of housing – "He was instrumental in the framing of the first London Building Act and was one of the pioneers of improvements in sanitation of towns."

Marcus Collins followed his father into architectural practice, later working on a number of noted London buildings including "London's Wonder Works", the Arcadia Cigarette Factory in Hampstead where, from the late 1920s to the late 1950s, Black Cat and Craven "A" cigarettes were made.

One of his younger brothers, Horace Samuel Collins (1875–1964), trained and worked as a surveyor but subsequently became Press agent for the Drury Lane Theatre, and was later appointed Secretary of the Theatrical Managers' Association.

Their youngest brother Frank Louis Collins (1878–1957) was Charles B. Cochran's general stage director, and another of the Collins brothers was Arthur P. Collins (1864–1932), managing director of Drury Lane Theatre.

== Private life ==
In 1889, Marcus Collins married Florette Davis, daughter of London portrait photographer Hyman Davis: Marcus Collins was thus brother-in-law of theatre critic and librettist "Owen Hall", novelist "Frank Danby", and journalist "Mrs Aria".
