= Spencer Frankl =

American dentist

Spencer N. Frankl (c. 1933 – c. Oct. 2007) was an American dentist.

== Biography ==
Frankl grew up in Philadelphia where he became friends with Rhoda Stein and married her seven years later. In 1958 he graduated from Temple University School of Dentistry and became a postdoctoral fellow in pediatric dentistry at Tufts University, where he received an MSD. Three years later, he became a faculty member at Boston University, where he founded the department of pediatric dentistry in 1964. During the same years he was the chief of the dental service at Beth Israel Hospital and by 1972 he launched the DMD program at Boston University. On October 24, 1977, he became the second dean at the Goldman School of Dental Medicine. He served in the role until his death in 2007, making him the longest-serving dean of a dental school in the United States.
