= Henry Stanley Bennett =

20th-century English literary historian

Bennett in 1959.

Henry Stanley Bennett, FBA (15 January 1889 – 5 June 1972) was an English literary historian. Known as Stanley Bennett and publishing as H. S. Bennett, he was an authority on medieval England. He wrote Life on the English Manor (1937), and subsequently wrote extensively on literature of the 15th and 16th centuries.

== Education and career ==
Bennett was educated initially at St Mark's College in Chelsea, and after graduation became a schoolmaster at a London elementary school. After being invalided during the final stages of the Great War, he returned to England and gained admission to study at Emmanuel College, Cambridge.

In 1920, Bennett married the literary critic Joan Frankau. Their son, Christopher S. Bennett, was a contemporary of the writer Simon Raven at King's College, Cambridge; he went into the Treasury, and disappeared (possibly intentionally, given a work dispute and his hosting of several parties before his departure) in September 1966 whilst on a walking tour of the Savoy Alps. Their daughter, Margaret (born 1924), married in 1948 the librarian Philip Gaskell.

Bennett was the Sandars Reader in Bibliography at the University of Cambridge in 1951. His topic was "English books and readers 1475 to 1557; being a study in the history of the book trade from Caxton to the incorporation of the Stationers’ Company."

Bennett's English Books and Readers 1475 to [1640]: Being a Study in the History of the Book Trade has been characterized as the "perfect commentary on the Short-title Catalogue of English Books...1475-1640," and "social and economic history at its best, not merely a standard work, but a classic."

== Bibliography ==
For a full bibliography see A List of His Writings Presented to H. S. Bennett on His Eightieth Birthday, 15 January 1969. Cambridge University Press. 15 January 1969.

- The Pastons and their England, 1922
- England from Chaucer to Caxton, 1928
- Life on the English Manor, 1937
- The Author and his Public in the Fourteenth and Fifteenth Centuries, 1938
- Shakespeare's Audience, 1944
- Medieval Literature and the Modern Reader, 1945
- Chaucer and Fifteenth-Century Verse and Prose, Oxford, 1947 (part of "The Oxford History Of English Literature" series)
- English Books and Readers, volume 1, 1475 to 1557: Being a Study in the History of the Book Trade from Caxton to the Incorporation of the Stationers' Company, Cambridge University Press, 1952
- Six Medieval Men and Women, 1955
- English Books and Readers, volume 2, 1558 to 1603, 1965
- English Books and Readers, volume 3, 1603 to 1640, 1970
