= Magda Frank =

Hungarian-Argentine sculptor (1914–2010)

Magda Frank Fischer
- Born: 20 July 1914; Kolozsvár, Austria-Hungary (present-day Cluj-Napoca, Romania)
- Died: 23 June 2010 (aged 95); Buenos Aires, Argentina
- Known for: Sculpture

Magda Frank Fischer (20 July 1914 – 23 June 2010) was a Hungarian-Argentine sculptor.

== Biography ==
She was born in Kolozsvár, Transylvania, which at that time belonged to Hungary but in 1918, was incorporated into Romania. Because of Nazi persecution, she left Hungary to settle in Switzerland. Years later, she moved to Paris to study at the Académie Julian. In 1950, she arrived in Buenos Aires, Argentina to visit her brother, her only living family member and here she met the man with whom she had, the sculptor Aurelio Macchi (1916-2010), whom died a week after her. Here, she was appointed professor at the Artes Visuales de Buenos Aires and exhibited at the Galería Pizarro. She participated in the Premio Palanza Buenos Aires. She received the Benito Quinquela Martín award at the Eduardo Sívori Museum, and was honored by the Argentine Senate. Her works are part of the collections at the Musée National d'Art Moderne in Paris, the National Museum of Fine Arts in Paris, the National Museum of Fine Arts in Buenos Aires. Frank resettled in Argentina in 1995 and built the Magda Frank House Museum in the Saavedra barrio at Vedia 3546. She died in 2010 in Buenos Aires.
