= The Love Story of Aliette Brunton (film) =

1924 film

- Directed by: Maurice Elvey
- Written by: Gilbert Frankau (novel); Alicia Ramsey
- Starring: Isobel Elsom; Henry Victor; James Carew; Humberston Wright
- Cinematography: J.J. Cox
- Production company: Stoll Pictures
- Distributed by: Stoll Pictures
- Release date: August 1924
- Running time: 7,450 feet
- Country: United Kingdom
- Languages: Silent; English intertitles

The Love Story of Aliette Brunton is a 1924 British silent romance film directed by Maurice Elvey and starring Isobel Elsom, Henry Victor and James Carew. The film was based on the 1922 novel of the same title by Gilbert Frankau. The film was a success on its release.

This was the last film Elvey made for Stoll Pictures, leaving them shortly afterwards for independent work and later for Gaumont British.

== Cast ==
- Isobel Elsom as Aliette Brunton
- Henry Victor as Ronald Cavendish
- James Carew as Hector Brunton
- Humberston Wright as Admiral Brunton
- Lewis Gilbert as William
- Minna Leslie as Maggie Peterson
- Adeline Hayden Coffin as Julia Cavendish

== Bibliography ==
- Low, Rachel. The History of British Film: Volume IV, 1918–1929. Routledge, 1997.
