= Timothy D'Arch Smith =

British author

- Born: 1936 (age 89–90)
- Occupations: Biographer, bookseller, novelist
- Writing career
- Notable work: Love in Earnest (1970)

Timothy d'Arch Smith (born 15 October 1936) is a British author and antiquarian bookseller. He co-founded Fuller d’Arch Smith Limited and Victim Press.

Early life and career

Timothy d’Arch Smith was born in Farnborough, Hampshire, England, on 15 October 1936. He was the son of Charles Harry d’Arch Smith and Ursula Nannette d’Arch Smith (née Frankau).

He was educated at St George’s, Windsor Castle, and Cheltenham College in Gloucestershire. His first job was at Foyles bookshop on Charing Cross Road in London. After working there, he was called up for National Service in the Army.

After completing his National Service, he joined the Royal Academy of Dramatic Art (RADA) in 1957. He later decided that acting was not for him and chose bookselling instead. In 1958, he joined the Times Bookshop on Wigmore Street, London, as a assistant. In 1961 he was promoted to buyer of its antiquarian department. The shop closed in 1968.

In 1970, he formed a partnership with Jean Overton Fuller and established Fuller d’Arch Smith Limited, selling antiquarian books. The company was dissolved after Overton Fuller’s death in 2009.

== Bibliography ==
- C. Day-Lewis: The Poet Laureate. A Bibliography (1968) (with Geoffrey Handley-Taylor)
- Love in Earnest: Some Notes on the Lives and Writings of English 'Uranian' Poets from 1889 to 1930 (1970)
- R. A. Caton and the Fortune Press: A Memoir and a Handlist (1983)
- Montague Summers: A Bibliography (1983)
- Smith, Timothy D.; D'Arch Smith, Timothy (1987). The books of the beast: essays on Aleister Crowley, Montague Summers, Francis Barrett and others. Wellingborough: Crucible. ISBN 978-0-85030-542-5.
- D'Arch Smith, Timothy (1992). Peepin' in a seafood store: some pleasures of rock music. Norwich: Russell. ISBN 978-0-85955-177-9.
- Alembic (1992)
- Bunbury: Two Notes on Oscar Wilde, Aleister Crowley and the Origin of Bunbury, and a Source for The Importance of Being Earnest (1998)
- D'Arch Smith, Timothy (2003). The times deceas'd: The Rare Book Departement of The Times Bookshop in the 1960s. Settrington, York: Stone Trough Books. ISBN 978-0-9529534-6-3.
- D'Arch Smith, Timothy (2015). The Frankaus: prejudice and principles within a London literary family. Norwich: Michael Russell. ISBN 978-0-85955-326-1.
