= Katherine Frank (anthropologist) =

American anthropologist

Academic background
- Education: Duke University (PhD)

Academic work
- Discipline: anthropology
- Sub-discipline: human sexuality
- Institutions: University of Nevada, Las Vegas
- Website: http://www.katefrank.com/

Katherine Frank is an American cultural anthropologist and Affiliate Research Faculty Researcher in the Department of Sociology at the University of Nevada, Las Vegas. She is known for her works on human sexuality; studying different facets of human sexual behavior such as group sex and strip club visits in order to understand their relationships with both historical and contemporary culture.

In her 2002 publication G-Strings and Sympathy: Strip Club Regulars and Male Desire, Frank discusses ethnographic research conducted for her dissertation at Duke University. Her methods of approach included a combination of ethnography and long-term participant observation as an exotic dancer in five separate clubs located in a southeastern U.S. city. This engagement allowed her to explore her research questions from an emic perspective; focusing on male identities and the social construction of space within strip clubs.

== Books ==
- Plays Well in Groups: A Journey Through The World of Group Sex, Rowman & Littlefield, 2013
- G-Strings and Sympathy: Strip Club Regulars and Male Desire,, Durham, NC: Duke University Press, 2002
- Flesh for Fantasy: Producing and Consuming Exotic Dance, with R. Danielle Egan and M. Lisa Johnson. Thunder's Mouth Press, 2006
