= Miriam Mendes Belisario =

English writer and educator (1816–1885)

- Born: 30 November 1816; London, England
- Died: 1885 (aged 68–69); London, England
- Occupations: Educator and writer
- Writing career
- Pen name: Little Miriam

Miriam Mendes Belisario (Hebrew: מרים מנדס בליסאריו; 30 November 1816 – 1885), also known by the pen name Little Miriam, was an English Jewish writer and educator who sought to make the Jewish religion more accessible to the young.

== Biography ==
Miriam Mendes Belisario was born in London in 1820, the daughter of Jamaican Jewish merchant Abraham Belisario. Her paternal grandfather was artist Isaac Mendes Belisario. The family were descendants of Portuguese Sephardim Jews who sought refuge in England from persecution.

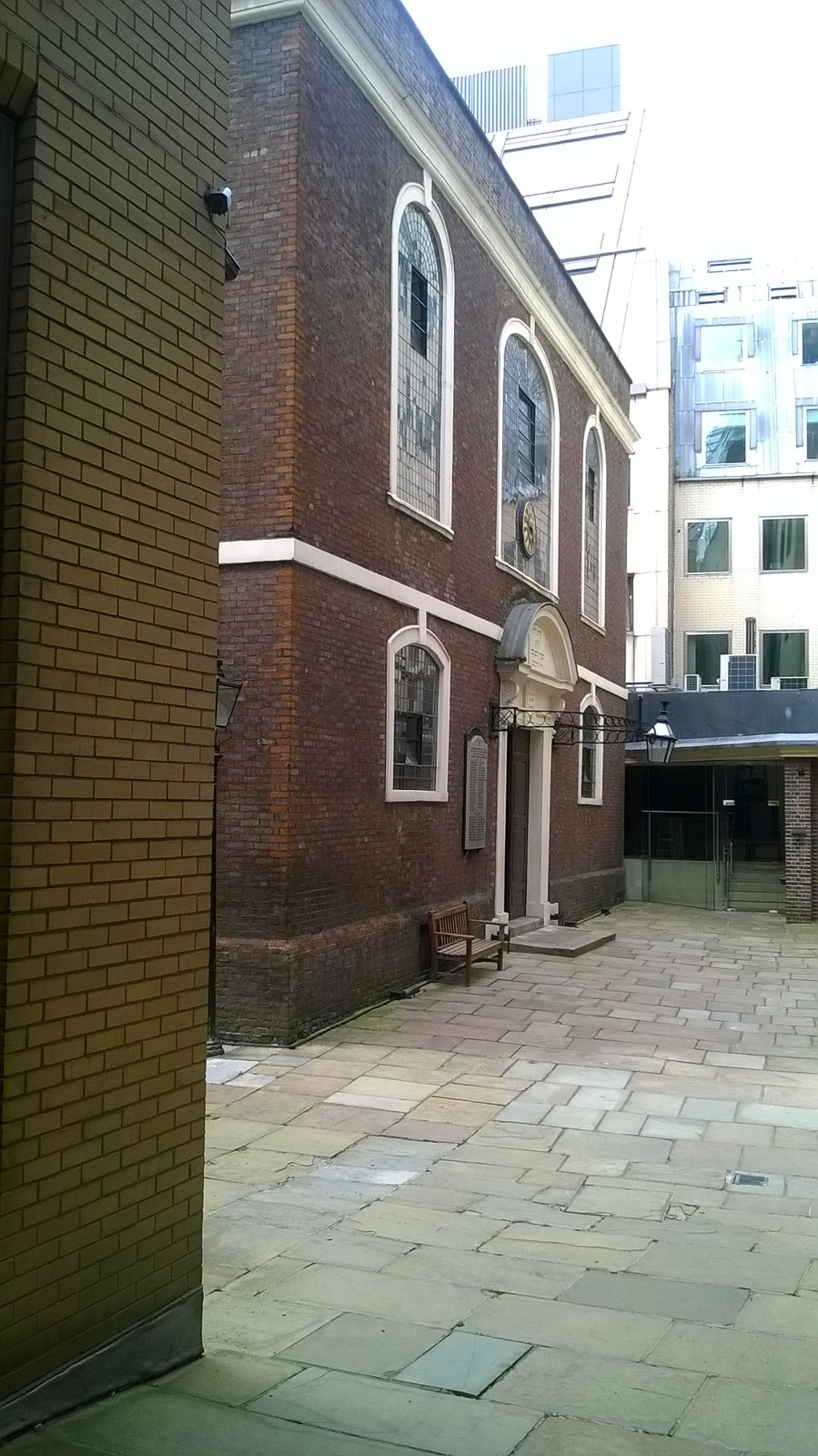
Bevis Marks Synagogue, where she attended

Belisario for many years ran an Orthodox girls' school in Clapton founded by her mother in 1807, in which numerous members of the Sephardic community were educated under her direction. She compiled a Hebrew and English Vocabulary for a selection of the daily prayers (1848), and wrote Sabbath Evenings at Home (1856), a collection of dialogues on the Jewish religion. Belisaro was an influence upon the Christian writer Charlotte Elizabeth Tonna.

== Bibliography ==
- Belisario, Miriam Mendes (1856). Sabbath Evenings at Home; or: Familiar Conversations on the Jewish Religion, its Spirit and Observances. London: S. Joel.
- Belisario, Miriam Mendes (1848). A Hebrew and English Vocabulary, from a Selection of the Daily Prayers. London.
