= Hampstead Cemetery =

Historic cemetery in West Hampstead, London

- Interactive map of Hampstead Cemetery

Details
- Established: 1876; 150 years ago
- Location: West Hampstead
- Country: England
- Coordinates: 51°33′19″N 0°12′00″W
- Type: Public, closed
- Owned by: Islington and Camden Cemetery Services
- Website: iccslondon.co.uk/the-sites/hampstead-cemetery/

Listed Building – Grade II
- Official name: Hampstead Cemetery
- Designated: 16 September 2002
- Reference no.: 1001644

Listed Building – Grade II
- Official name: Hampstead Cemetery Mortuary Chapels
- Designated: 14 May 1974
- Reference no.: 1113020

Hampstead Cemetery is a historic cemetery in West Hampstead, London. It is managed by Islington and Camden Cemetery Services and opens seven days a week, with closing times varying throughout the year.

== Geography ==
Hampstead Cemetery is situated on Fortune Green Road and is bordered on the northern side by the sports ground of University College School. A public footpath running from Hocroft Road to Fortune Green runs through the cemetery, effectively splitting it in two. The entire site covers 26 acres (0.11 km^{2}).

The cemetery has a large number of mature ash trees. Other trees include yew, sycamore, Norway maple, silver birch, Lombardy poplar, purple cherry-plum, willow and Swedish whitebeam. There is a wildlife area in the north part of the eastern half of the cemetery. This has been planted with trees, shrubs and wild flowers especially attractive to wildlife, such as field maple, hazel, oak, oxeye daisy, common knapweed and bird's-foot-trefoil. This is where most of the site's butterflies are to be found, including small white, speckled wood, holly blue, meadow brown and small copper. Birds recorded in the cemetery include jay, robin redbreast, green woodpecker, long-tailed tit, goldcrest, willow warbler and linnet. It is also home to the ubiquitous grey squirrel, as well as many species of fungi.

== History ==
Hampstead Burial Board was established in 1873 to provide a new cemetery for the parish of Hampstead.

The cemetery was consecrated by the Bishop of London and opened in November 1876.

== Features ==
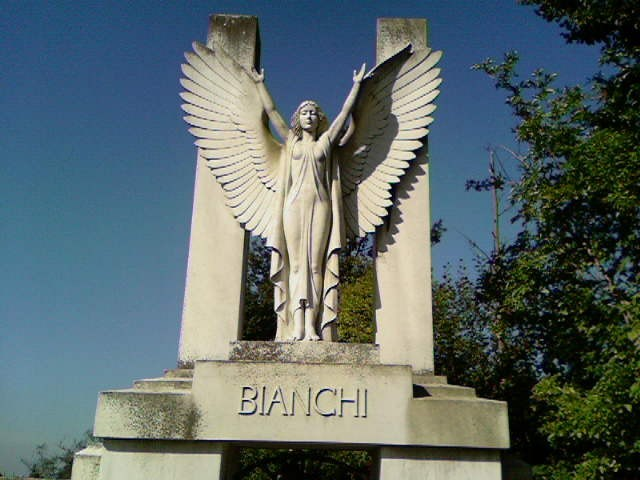
The Bianchi Monument in Hampstead Cemetery

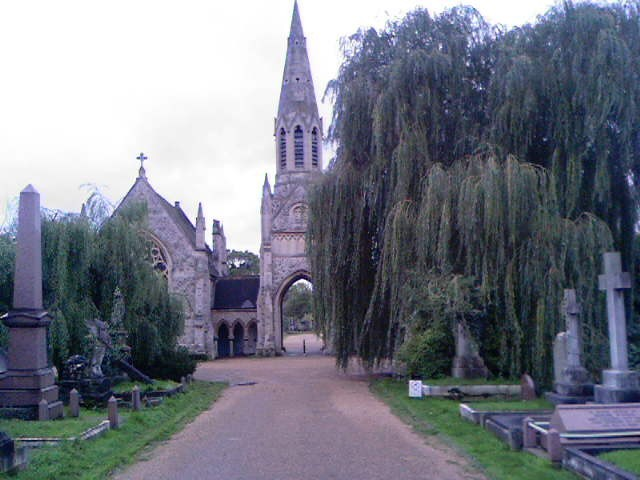
One of the Neogothic chapels and the central porte-cochère

An estimated 60,000 people are buried there. While there are no new grave spaces available, there is an area for cremated remains to the north of the cemetery, by the Fortune Green Road exit.

The cemetery has a pair of Gothic style mortuary chapels, both of which are Grade II listed buildings. The southern chapel was originally Anglican, and the northern non-conformist; they share a common porte-cochère. Currently, only the southern chapel is in use as an inter-faith place of worship. There is also an entry lodge made of Kentish Rag and Bath stone. The Heritage Lottery Fund has funded restoration work on the buildings.

A large number of Celtic crosses can be found in the area to the southwest of the chapel, marking the presence of several Scottish families. The northeastern corner has some notable examples of modern and Art Deco stonemasonry, in particular the Bianchi monument and the sculpted church organ in memory of Charles Barritt.

=== Notable monuments ===
The eastern part of the cemetery houses the so-called Bianchi Monument, a large triangular grave for the Gall family, executed in the finest Art Deco style by the Trieste-born sculptor Romeo Rathmann in 1937. The most prominent feature of the grave – a stylised sculpture of a female angel raising her hands to heaven – has become famous in its own right, and often adorns the covers of local guidebooks.

Similarly, the tomb of James Wilson ('Wilson Pasha'), Chief Engineer to the Egyptian Government (1875-1901), executed in red marble and also found in the eastern section, has a striking Egyptian look to it.

The monument built by the sculptor Sir William Goscombe John to his wife Marthe (died 1923) was stolen from the cemetery in 2001 but later returned after being spotted at an auction a few months later. It was then moved to East Finchley Cemetery but was once more stolen from a storage area in autumn 2006. It has not been recovered.

=== Notable burials ===
- Dorothea Baird, actress (wife of H.B. Irving, also buried in the same grave)
- Nigel Balchin, novelist
- Francis Barraud, painter (most notably of His Master's Voice)
- Lajos Biro, Hungarian novelist
- Dennis Brain, horn player
- Ann Dudin Brown, philanthropist and co-foundress of Westfield College
- Gladys Cooper, actress
- Ewan Christian, architect
- Alan Coren, journalist, writer and satirist
- William Randal Cremer, politician and pacifist
- Sebastian Ziani de Ferranti, engineer and inventor
- Frank Bernard Dicksee, Pre-Raphaelite painter
- Maurice Feild, painter
- Walter Field, painter
- Andrew Fisher, fifth Prime Minister of Australia
- Banister Fletcher (Senior), architectural historian, and his son Banister Fletcher, architect
- Gilbert Frankau, novelist
- Ronald Frankau, comedian and comedy partner of Tommy Handley
- Pamela Frankau, author
- Ronald Fraser, actor
- Charles Gatliff, housing campaigner
- Walter Goodman, artist, author and illustrator
- Kate Greenaway, children's book illustrator
- John Hargrave, pacifist and social activist
- H. B. Irving, actor son of Sir Henry Irving
- William Stanley Jevons, British economist and logician
- Henry Arthur Jones, playwright
- Goscombe John, sculptor
- Tamara Karsavina, Russian Prima Ballerina
- John Kensit, English religious leader and polemicist
- Joseph Lister, discoverer of antiseptic treatment of wounds
- Marie Lloyd, music hall star
- Marie Lloyd Jr., entertainer and daughter of the above
- George Alexander Macfarren, composer and musicologist
- Jo Maxwell-Muller, actress
- Gaetano Meo, artist's model for the Pre-Raphaelites, landscape painter, and craftsman in mosaic and stained glass
- Charlotte Mew, poet
- Grand Duke Michael Mikhailovich of Russia and his wife Countess Sophie von Merenberg, Countess de Torby
- Alan Moorehead, writer
- Agnes G. Murphy, writer
- Julia Neilson, actress wife of Fred Terry
- Tom O'Brien, politician
- Herbert Andrew Patey, flying ace and military hero
- Adam Pragier, Polish socialist, minister and writer
- Harry Randall, actor and comedian
- Paula Rego, Portuguese painter
- Robert Reid (Australian politician) merchant and member of the Victorian Legislative Council and Australian Senate
- Joseph Rotblat, Nobel Laureate
- Eustace Short, co-founder of Short Brothers
- Horace Short, aircraft pioneer
- Elliott Spiers, actor (played the role of Marc in the 1988 film Paperhouse)
- George Adolphus Storey, painter
- James W. Tate, composer
- Fred Terry, actor (younger brother of Ellen Terry)
- Dennis Neilson-Terry, actor son of Fred Terry and Julia Neilson
- Florence Kate Upton, creator of the Golliwog
- Valli Valli, musical comedy actress and silent film performer
- Victor Willing, painter
- Charles Wyndham, actor and theatre manager

=== War graves ===
There are buried in the cemetery 216 Commonwealth service personnel from the First World War and 44 from the Second, besides one Polish and one Czech serviceman from the latter war. Those whose graves could not be marked by headstones are listed on a Screen Wall memorial near the north boundary, right of the main entrance.

=== Inscriptions ===
The cemetery contains more than one grave with humorous or bizarre inscriptions. On the main avenue of the eastern section can be seen the grave of John Kensit (died 1902), a religious protester who was "struck down by the missile of an assassin in Birkenhead", actually a chisel thrown by a member of a crowd he was preaching to (the man was charged with manslaughter but later acquitted).

The following epitaph is carved on the tomb of Charles Cowper Ross, "a man of the theatre":

What will be said,
When I am dead,
Of what I used to do?
They liked my smile?
I failed with style?
Or, more than likely, "Who?"
