= The Love Story of Aliette Brunton (novel) =

Novel by Gilbert Frankau

- Author: Gilbert Frankau
- Language: English
- Genre: Romance
- Publication date: 1922
- Publication place: United Kingdom
- Media type: Print

The Love Story of Aliette Brunton is a romance novel by the British writer Gilbert Frankau which was first published in 1922.

== Film adaptation ==
In 1924 the novel was adapted into a film The Love Story of Aliette Brunton made by Stoll Pictures and directed by Maurice Elvey.

== Bibliography ==
- Goble, Alan. The Complete Index to Literary Sources in Film. Walter de Gruyter, 1999.
