= Todd Endelman =

American historian (born 1946)

Todd M. Endelman (born 1946) is the William Haber Professor of Modern Jewish History at the University of Michigan. He specializes in the social history of Jews in Western Europe and in Anglo-Jewish history. He is the author of The Jews of Georgian England, 1714-1830: Tradition and Change in a Liberal Society (1979), Radical Assimilation in Anglo-Jewish History, 1656-1945 (1990), and The Jews of Britain, 1656-2000 (2002).

== Career ==
Endelman was awarded a B.A. in 1968 from the University of California, Berkeley, and his Ph.D. in 1976 at Harvard University.

He taught at Yeshiva University and Indiana University, then moved to Michigan in 1985. While at the University of Michigan, Endelman served as director of the Jean & Samuel Frankel Center for Judaic Studies intermittently for 11 years. During his tenure as director, there was a significant growth for the program, including the creation of a Masters program and the establishment of the Frankel Institute for Advanced Judaic Studies with a $20 million endowment. At the time, it was the largest gift ever given to a Jewish Studies program.

He was succeeded as director by fellow historian Deborah Dash Moore in 2005. Endelman served as the Frankel Institutes's Head Fellow for the 2008–09 academic year.

== Awards ==
1980: National Jewish Book Award in the Jewish History category for The Jews of Georgian England, 1714-1830: Tradition and Change in a Liberal Society
