= Terry and June =

British TV sitcom (1979–1987)

- Terry and June opening titles
- Genre: Sitcom
- Starring: Terry Scott; June Whitfield; Terence Alexander; Tim Barrett; John Quayle; Reginald Marsh; Rosemary Frankau; Allan Cuthbertson
- Country of origin: United Kingdom
- Original language: English
- No. of series: 9
- No. of episodes: 65 (list of episodes)

Production
- Running time: 30 minutes (approximately)

Original release
- Network: BBC1
- Release: 24 October 1979 – 31 August 1987

Related
- Happy Ever After

Terry and June is a BBC television sitcom, broadcast on BBC1 from 1979 to 1987. The show was largely a reworking of Happy Ever After, and starred Terry Scott and June Whitfield as a middle-aged, middle-class suburban couple, Terry and June Medford, who live in Purley.

Most of the 65 episodes were written by John Kane, with seven other writers also contributing some episodes.

== Production ==
Terry Scott and June Whitfield began their television partnership in Scott On in 1968. On 7 May 1974, a Comedy Playhouse pilot called "Happy Ever After" aired on BBC1 with Scott and Whitfield playing Terry and June Fletcher, a middle-class couple whose grown-up children have just left home. This was commissioned into a series of the same name, and five series and two Christmas specials were broadcast, ending on 25 April 1979.

John T. Chapman, one of the original writers, said that the programme had run out of ideas and had to come to an end. BBC Comedy, however, was unwilling to end a popular show, and so brought in fresh new writers. Legal complications meant that the name and setting had to change, and so on 24 October 1979, Terry and June was born.

The characteristics of Terry and June remained largely similar. However, the character of Aunt Lucy and her mynah bird, a popular ingredient of Happy Ever After, were dropped.

The character of Melinda Spry, Terry and June's neighbour, was originally played by Joan Benham in the 1981 episode "The Lawnmower". Benham died on 13 June 1981, and Terry and June was her last television appearance. She was replaced by Diana King.

The BBC planned a feature-length film, entitled Terry and June – The Movie, but it was never made.

Despite being seen as "cosy" and somewhat "dated" even upon its original broadcast, and lampooned by contemporaneous alternative comedy programmes, the show nevertheless attracted large viewing figures. The series never came to an 'official' end, with series 9 in 1987 not planned to be the last, but, according to main writer John Kane, the show "just sort of petered out in the end", after series 8 (1985) already having been "buried in an early tea-time slot", with the BBC "slightly embarrassed of their 'safe and cosy' sitcom but one which still commanded strong audience figures". Several scripts for a proposed series 10 were submitted, but in the end the show "simply wasn't renewed". During filming of series 9, Terry Scott commented that he felt the programme's format had started to become tired and that he was keen to do something new.

In 2004, it came 73rd in Britain's Best Sitcom, jointly with Happy Ever After.

In The Listener at the end of its run it was described, not unaffectionately, by Andy Medhurst as "a Macmillanite sitcom" to which Thatcherism was as alien as socialism.

The theme tune, "Bell Hop" by John Shakespeare (real name: John Carter), was also used for the radio series Never Too Late which starred Thora Hird and Joe Gladwin and ran for two series (1981 and 1982).

== Cast ==
- Terry Scott as Terence 'Terry' Medford
- June Whitfield as June Medford
- Reginald Marsh as Sir Dennis Hodge (25 episodes)
- Terence Alexander (3 episodes), Tim Barrett (13 episodes) and John Quayle as Malcolm Harris (15 episodes)
- Rosemary Frankau as Beattie Harris (24 episodes)
- John Warner as Reverend Austin Doyle (14 episodes)
- Joanna Henderson as Miss Nora Fennell (14 episodes)
- Allan Cuthbertson as Tarquin Spry (7 episodes)
- Roger Martin as Alan Medford (6 episodes)
- Patsy Smart as Miss Nora Dingle (6 episodes)
- Joan Benham (1 episode) and Diana King (actress) (3 episodes) as Melinda Spry
- Evie Garrett as Miss Dunwiddy (4 episodes)
- Anita Graham as Tina Pillbeam (4 episodes)
- Roland Curram as Brian Pillbeam (3 episodes)
- Jessica Turner (2 episodes) and Caroline Holdaway (1 episode) as Wendy
- Kit Thacker as Roger (2 episodes)

== Plot ==
The series starts as middle-class couple Terry and June Medford prepare to move into 26 Elmtree Avenue in Purley, Surrey. They are in their late 40s and have a daughter named Wendy, who is married to Roger; both are rarely seen. Terry's nephew, Alan Medford, pays occasional visits where he always causes some form of trouble. Terry can be headstrong and determined, but often as a result of his childlike enthusiasm getting the better of him, and his plans and schemes normally end in disaster. June, meanwhile, is tolerant of her husband, but frequently doubtful about his ideas and acts as the voice of reason and common sense, although this often falls upon deaf ears.

Terry works for Playsafe Fire Extinguishers and Appliances, and his boss is Malcolm Harris. In a continuity error his surname is sometimes referred to as Laurence instead of Harris. Malcolm frequently has affairs, and he and his wife Beattie, a friend of June, often argue. The owner of Playsafe is Sir Dennis Hodge (Reginald Marsh, who played a similar character in The Good Life), a grumpy man who rules the company with a rod of iron. His personal secretary of over 20 years is Miss Nora Fennell, whose fondness for Sir Dennis is not reciprocated.

In the first two series, their neighbours are Brian and Tina Pillbeam. From the third to sixth series, the Medfords' neighbours are Tarquin and Melinda Spry. Terry and Tarquin frequently compete against each other.

== Episodes ==
Terry and June first aired on 24 October 1979, running for a total of nine series and 65 episodes, (including four Christmas specials). The last ever episode aired on 31 August 1987.

== Home media ==
All nine series and four Christmas specials have been released on DVD in Region 2. The Complete Collection 10 disc boxset DVD Region 2 has also been released on 23 October 2017.

DVD Title	Disc No.	Year	Number of episodes	DVD release
DVD Title	Disc No.	Year	Number of episodes	Region 2
Series 1	1	1979	6	15 August 2005
Series 2	1	1980	7	30 January 2006
Series 3	1	1981	7	17 April 2006
Series 4	1	1982	6	19 June 2006
Series 5	1	1982	7	28 August 2006
Series 6	1	1983	6	16 April 2007
Series 7	1	1983	6	13 August 2007
Series 8 Volume 1	1	1985	6	19 May 2008
Series 8 Volume 2	1	1985	7	18 August 2008
Series 9	1	1987	7	4 May 2009
Complete Collection	10	1979–87	65	23 October 2017

== See also ==
- British sitcom
