= Renee Roberts =

British actress (1908–1996)

- Roberts as Miss Gatsby in Fawlty Towers
- Born: Irene Roberts; 24 September 1908; England
- Died: 6 February 1996 (aged 87); Wandsworth, London, England
- Occupation: Actress
- Spouses: Ronald Frankau (m. 1930; died 1951) Eric P Pattison (m. 1952; div. 1957)
- Children: Rosemary Frankau

Irene Roberts (24 September 1908 – 6 February 1996), better known by her professional name Renee Roberts, was an English actress who is best remembered for her portrayal of Miss Ursula Gatsby in Fawlty Towers in both series in 1975 and 1979, as well as a 1983 episode of Only Fools and Horses.

She made numerous television appearances in Britain, starting in the 1960s.

== Personal life ==
She was married to the actor Ronald Frankau. Their daughter, Rosemary Frankau, was also an actress.
