= Gilbert Frankau =

British writer

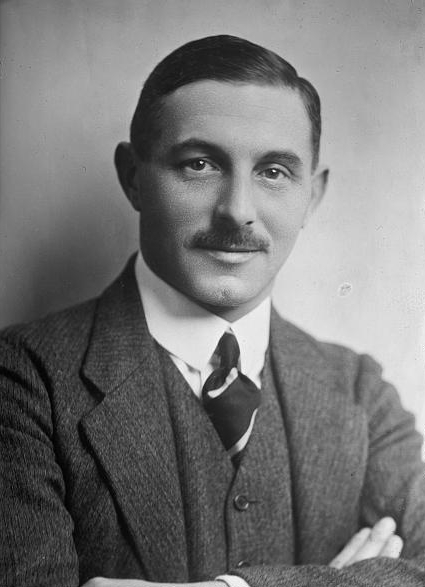
- Born: 21 April 1884
- Died: 4 November 1952 (aged 68)
- Occupation: Novelist

Captain Gilbert Frankau (21 April 1884 – 4 November 1952) was a popular British novelist. He was known also for verse (he was a war poet of World War I), including a number of verse novels, and short stories. He was born in London into a Jewish family but was baptised as an Anglican at the age of 13. After education at Eton College, he went into the family cigar business and became managing director on his twenty-first birthday, his father, Arthur Frankau, having died in November 1904. A few months before his death, at sixty-eight, from lung cancer, he converted to Roman Catholicism.

== Career ==
Frankau served in the British Army from the outbreak of war in 1914. He was first commissioned in the 9th Battalion of the East Surrey Regiment on 6 October 1914, then transferred to the Royal Field Artillery in March 1915. He went to the Western Front as a brigade adjutant and fought in battles of the British Expeditionary Force – Loos, Ypres and the Somme in France and Belgium – and wrote for the Wipers Times. He was made staff captain in October 1916 for special duty in Italy. He was invalided out on 22 February 1918. His later used his wartime experiences in novels. The family business did not survive the war.

His novels, while having conventional romantic content, also contained material from his conservative politics and meditations on Jewish identity in the climate of the times. Some of them were filmed (see Christopher Strong; If I Marry Again was based on a short story). His status as a divorcé (he married three times) frustrated his political ambitions – the Conservative Party of the time did not regard divorce as acceptable. His outspoken criticism of Stanley Baldwin also did not endear him to the Tory leadership.

Recalling the 1920s, Gilbert Frankau wrote, "Political journalism meant more to me than my novels and short stories. Only fiction, however, could make me enough money to gratify my supreme ambition – a seat in the House." In 1928, he was invited by the proprietor of "The Great Eight" – a group of weeklies including Tatler, The Graphic and The Illustrated London News – to launch a new Right-wing weekly newspaper, Britannia. Frankau threw himself into this venture with characteristic energy, but it was not a success. After he had been unceremoniously removed from his post, Time gleefully reported:

Twirling his glass of sherry, Gilbert 'Swankau' Frankau alibied: "As the founder of Britannia [sip], I said what I thought, without fear or favour. Evidently, I am against lots of people [sip], for I believe in everything British! That was what Britannia stood for while I held her helm." Actually the Frankau weekly Britannia stood not for but against everything British or foreign which did not come within the extreme Fascist fringe of the little Semite's whims. He was 'agin' the Government of Conservative Prime Minister Stanley Baldwin, 'agin' the David Lloyd George Liberals, 'agin' the Ramsay MacDonald Laborites...

In the aftermath of this disappointment, Gilbert Frankau – according to his own account – approached a Conservative politician he "knew to be rather close to Stanley Baldwin", offering to stand for Parliament at his own expense in the forthcoming General Election, but was advised: "'I'd better be frank with you. As a divorced man, you could never be adopted by the Conservative party. If you're so keen on a political career, I should try the Labour people. They're not so particular.'" Frankau remained a staunch Right-winger, however. In 1933, his notorious Daily Express article "As a Jew I am Not Against Hitler" was published shortly after Adolf Hitler had come to power in Germany; he later retracted his position. In fact, this particular piece was more balanced than the headline now appears: "Time alone will tell whether the little Austrian with the Charlie Chaplin moustache is a mere spellbinder or a statesman", comments Frankau, ending with the poignant question, "who are we, the great expounders of democracy, and how are we, already disarmed to the point of national danger, to interfere?"

His autobiography, completed in August 1939, includes emphatically anti-German comments, such as: "The Pomper of Potsdam looked all of a warlord, even if he did bolt to Doorn like a rabbit. The Neurasthenic of Nuremberg and his gangster stooges look – the hooligans they are."

In August 1939, on the eve of the Second World War, Frankau was commissioned into the Royal Air Force Volunteer Reserve. He was promoted Squadron Leader in April 1940 but invalided from the service in February 1941. He was awarded permanent disability retired pay in 1944, in the meantime having served in the 14th (Home Guard) Battalion of the Royal Sussex Regiment from 1942.

== Critical reception ==
In her 1932 book Fiction and the Reading Public, Q. D. Leavis criticised Gilbert Frankau. Leavis described Frankau and Warwick Deeping as pompous writers whose novels acted to "debase the emotional currency by touching grossly on fine issues."

== Family ==
His mother, Julia Frankau (1859–1916), sister of Mrs Aria and Owen Hall, wrote under the name Frank Danby (and is said to have collaborated with George Moore). His mother was an associate of Oscar Wilde. His youngest daughter from his first marriage, Pamela Frankau, was also a successful writer. His eldest daughter Ursula D'Arch Smith (Nee Frankau) wrote under the name Mary Nicholson. Her son Timothy d'Arch Smith, writer and bibliographer, is a grandson. His brother was comedian Ronald Frankau. His sister was the Cambridge don Joan Bennett (1896–1986), one of the "constellation of critics" called by the defence in the Lady Chatterley Trial. His niece was the actress Rosemary Frankau.

== Works ==
- Eton Echoes (1901) poems
- The XYZ of Bridge (1906)
- Jack – One of Us: A Novel in Verse (1912) also as One of Us
- Tid'apa (What Does It Matter?) (1914)
- A Song of the Guns in Flanders (1916) poems
- How Rifleman Brown Came To Valhalla (1916)
- The Woman of the Horizon: A Romance of Nineteen-Thirteen (1917)
- One of Them: A Novelette in Verse (1918)
- The Judgement of Valhalla (1918)
- The Other Side, and Other Poems (1918)
- The City of Fear and Other Poems (1918)
- Peter Jackson, Cigar Merchant: A Romance of Married Life (1919)
- The Seeds of Enchantment (1921)
- The Love Story of Aliette Brunton (1922)
- Men, Maids and Mustard Pot (1923) short stories
- Peter Jameson: A Modern Romance (1923)
- Poetical Works (1923)
- Gerald Cranston's Lady (1924)
- Life – and Erica: A Romance (1924)
- The Dominant Type of Man (1925) non-fiction
- My Unsentimental Journey (1926)
- Masterson, a Story of an English Gentleman (1926)
- Twelve Tales (1927)
- So Much Good: A Novel in a New Manner (1928)
- Martin Make-Believe (1930)
- Dance, Little Gentleman! (1930)
- Concerning Peter Jackson and Others (c.1930)
- Christopher Strong (1932), adapted into a 1933 film directed by Dorothy Arzner, Christopher Strong, starring Katharine Hepburn in her second screen role.
- Wine, Women And Waiters (1932)
- The Lonely Man: A Romance of Love and the Secret Service (1932)
- Secret Services: A Collection of Tales (1934)
- Everywoman (1934)
- A Century of Love Stories (c.1935) editor
- Farewell Romance (1936)
- Three Stories of Romance (1936) with Warwick Deeping and Ethel Mannin
- Experiments in Crime and Other Stories (1937)
- More of Us: Being the Present-Day Adventures of "One of Us": A Novel in Verse (1937)
- The Dangerous Years: A Trilogy (1937)
- Royal Regiment: A Drama of Contemporary Behaviours (1938)
- Gilbert Frankau's Self Portrait: A Novel of His Own Life (1940)
- Winter of Discontent (1942) as Air Ministry Room 28 (1942) in the United States
- World Without End (1942)
- Escape to Yesterday (1942)
- Selected Verses (1943)
- Three Englishman: A Romance of Married Lives (1935), (Re-issued with slight emendations December 1944)
- Michael's Wife (1948)
- Son of the Morning (1949)
- Oliver Trenton K.C. (1951)
- Unborn Tomorrow: A Last Story (1953)
- The Peter Jackson Omnibus
