= Pamela Frankau =

English novelist (1908–1967)

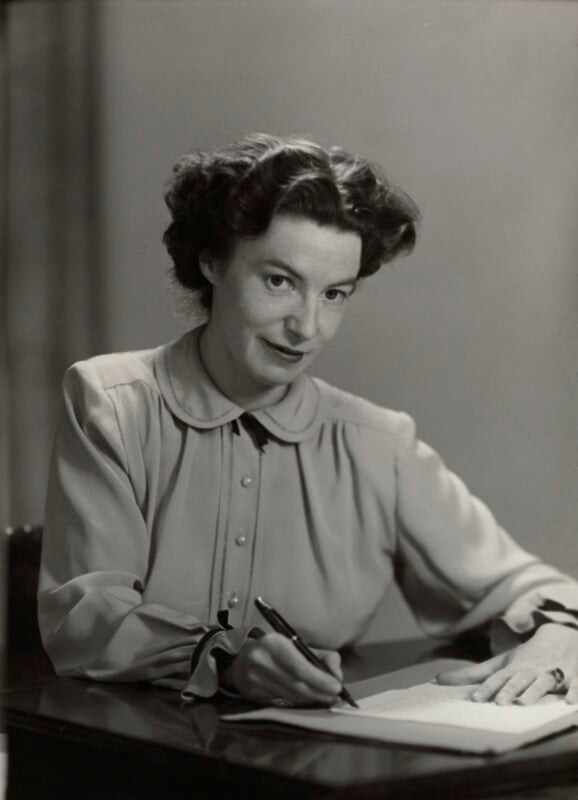
- Frankau in 1949
- Born: 3 January 1908; London, England
- Died: 8 June 1967 (aged 59); Hampstead, London, England
- Occupation: Writer
- Years active: 1927–1967
- Notable work: Jezebel, A Wreath for the Enemy, The Willow Cabin.
- Partner(s): Humbert Wolfe (1931–1940), Marjorie Vernon Whitefoord (c. 1939–1942), Marshall Dill Jr (m.1945–div.1951), Margaret Webster (c.1953–1967, Frankau's death)
- Parent(s): Gilbert Frankau (father); Dorothea Frances Markham Drummond-Black (mother)
- Relatives: Julia Frankau (paternal grandmother); Gilbert Frankau (father); Ronald Frankau (paternal cousin)

Pamela Sydney Frankau (3 January 1908 – 8 June 1967) was a popular English novelist from a prominent artistic and literary family. She was abandoned by her novelist father Gilbert Frankau at an early age, and she became a prolific writer. She stopped writing for a decade after the death of her lover, the poet Humbert Wolfe, in 1940. After serving in World War II, she was married for several years to an American naval officer, but returned to England and resumed her writing career.

== Early life and career ==
Frankau was born in London, the younger daughter of Dorothea Frances Markham Drummond-Black and the novelist Gilbert Frankau. Her grandmother was the satirist Julia Frankau, one of several famous siblings, and her uncle was the British radio comedian Ronald Frankau. Never attentive to his two daughters, her father abandoned the family for another woman in 1919, and Frankau and her elder sister Ursula were sent as boarders to Burgess Hill Girls (previously named Burgess Hill School for Girls) in Sussex until 1924. Frankau wrote about this period in her autobiographical novel I Find Four People (1935).

She had success as a writer from a young age. Marriage of Harlequin (1927), her first novel, was written at age 19 and well received by critics. Over the next dozen years, she published 20 novels. She had a long but stormy friendship with the author and journalist Dame Rebecca West. A long relationship with the married poet Humbert Wolfe ended with his death in 1940. Frankau then ceased to write for almost 10 years. During the Second World War, she worked for the BBC, the Ministry of Food and then with the Auxiliary Territorial Service, where she began a lesbian affair with fellow officer Marjorie Vernon Whitefoord, who sponsored Frankau's conversion to Roman Catholicism in 1942.

In 1945, she married Marshall Dill Jr. (1916 – 2000), a former American naval intelligence officer. After the war, Dill became a university professor. They resided in California. In 1946, their only child, Anthony Marshall Dill, died in infancy, resulting from complications due to premature birth. The couple divorced in 1951, and Frankau later returned to London

== Later years ==
The Willow Cabin, Frankau's most successful novel, was published in 1949, which was based partly on the experience of her love for Wolfe, and her following novels were widely read. First published in 1954, A Wreath for the Enemy is perhaps her most enduring novel, and still is in print. In the novel, the events of one night transform what appears at first to be a typical adolescent crisis into a prolonged struggle for self-definition on the part of the novel's teenage protagonist. In part autobiographical, Frankau clearly identified with her lead character, who is presented as a writer in development.

A long and happy relationship with the theatre director Margaret Webster began in the mid-1950s. The couple divided their time among residences in Hampstead, London, and Aquinnah, Massachusetts, and a home in France. Frankau wrote of her distant relationship with her father in Pen to Paper (1961).

In a response to a questionnaire for the book Authors Take Sides on Vietnam, Frankau stated, "I am against the war in Vietnam because I am against all wars, no matter how, where or why they are fought".

In 1962, Frankau was diagnosed with breast cancer, with a poor prognosis due to the remedial cancer treatments available at the time. After a five-year battle with the disease, Frankau died aged 59 at the Hampstead home she had shared with Margaret Webster. Frankau was buried in a Catholic service at Hampstead Cemetery. Webster dedicated her first autobiography, titled The Same, Only Different: Five Generations of a Great Theatre Family (1969), to Frankau's memory. Colonel Blessington, Frankau's final novel was edited by her cousin, writer Diana Raymond; it was posthumously published in 1968.

== Works ==
- Marriage of Harlequin (1927)
- The Fig Tree (1928)
- The Black Minute, and other stories (1929)
- Three. A Novel (1929)
- She and I (1930)
- Born at Sea (1931)
- Letters from a Modern Daughter to her Mother (1931)
- The Devil We Know (1931)
- "I was the Man". (1932)
- Women are so Serious, and other stories (1932)
- The Foolish Apprentices (1933) - published in America as Walk into my Parlour
- A Manual of Modern Manners (1933)
- Tassell-Gentle (1934) as Fly Now Falcon (US)
- I Find Four People (1935) autobiography
- Fifty-Fifty, and other stories (1936)
- Villa Anodyne (1936)
- Jezebel (1937)
- Some New Planet (1937)
- No News (1938)
- A Democrat Dies (1939)
- The Devil We Know (1939)
- Shaken in the Wind (1948)
- The Willow Cabin (1949)
- The Offshore Light (1952)
- The Winged Horse (1953)
- To The Moment of Triumph (1953)
- A Wreath for the Enemy (1954)
- The Bridge (1957)
- Ask me no More (1958)
- Road through the Woods (1960)
- Pen to Paper. A novelist's notebook (1961)
- Letter to a Parish Priest (1962)
- Sing for Your Supper (1963)
- Slaves of the Lamp (1965)
- Over the Mountains (1967)
- Colonel Blessington (1968) posthumous, editor Diana Raymond
