= Joan Bennett (literary scholar) =

British literary scholar and critic

- Born: Aline Frankau; 26 June 1896
- Died: 20 July 1986 (aged 90)
- Spouse: Henry Stanley Bennett (m. 1920; died 1972)

Academic background
- Education: Girton College, Cambridge

Academic work
- Discipline: Literature
- Sub-discipline: Metaphysical poets; Virginia Woolf; George Eliot
- Institutions: Girton College, Cambridge; Faculty of English, University of Cambridge

Joan Bennett (née Aline Frankau; 26 June 1896 – 20 July 1986), also known as Joan Frankau, was a British literary scholar and critic. She was a Fellow of Girton College, Cambridge, and a lecturer in English at the University of Cambridge from 1936 to 1964. She was among the "constellation of critics" called by the defence in the Lady Chatterley Trial of D. H. Lawrence.

== Life and career ==
Bennett was the daughter of London cigar importer Arthur Frankau (1849–1904) and writer Julia Frankau (1859–1916). Though she was known as Joan throughout her life, she was christened Aline. She married the Cambridge literary historian Henry Stanley Bennett (1889–1972) in 1920.

Bennett was educated at Wycombe Abbey and Girton College, Cambridge, and was a life fellow of Girton, and additionally a lecturer in English at the University of Cambridge from 1936 to 1964. She wrote one of the first critical studies of Virginia Woolf. She was awarded the Rose Mary Crawshay Prize by the British Academy in 1963 for her book Sir Thomas Brown: His Life and Achievement.

As one of the expert witnesses in the Lady Chatterley Trial, she helped counter the arguments of the prosecution by confirming Lawrence's reputation as a novelist, that the work was more than a description of sexual encounters, and that Lawrence's repeated use of ‘four-letter words’ were justified by literary intent. Bennett's mother had earlier been credited by Mrs Belloc Lowndes with having been "one of the very few to recognise the genius of D. H. Lawrence".

== Works ==
Publications by Joan Bennett include—

- Four Metaphysical Poets – Donne, Herbert, Vaughan, Crashaw, Cambridge University Press 1934
- Virginia Woolf – Her Art as a Novelist, Cambridge University Press 1945
- George Eliot – Her Mind and her Art, Cambridge University Press 1948
- Sir Thomas Browne – "A Man of Achievement in Literature", Cambridge University Press 1962
- Five Metaphysical Poets – Donne, Herbert, Vaughan, Crashaw, Marvell, Cambridge University Press 1964
