= List of writers by name: F =

The following is a List of writers by name whose last names begin with F:

Abbreviations: ch = children's; d = drama, screenwriting; f = fiction; nf = non-fiction; p = poetry, song lyrics

== Fa ==
- Frederick William Faber (1814–1863, England, p/nf)
- Geoffrey Faber (1889–1961, England, p/nf)
- George Stanley Faber (1773–1854, England, nf)
- Dušan Fabian (born 1975, Czechoslovakia/Slovakia, f)
- Johannes Fabian (1937–2026, Germany, nf)
- Mary Fabilli (1914–2011, US, p)
- Kinga Fabó (1953–2021, Hungary, p/nf)
- Johan Fabricius (1899–1981, Netherlands, f/ch/nf)
- Johann Albert Fabricius (1668–1736, Germany, nf)
- Robert Fabyan (died c. 1512, England, nf)
- Héctor Abad Faciolince (born 1958, Colombia, f/nf)
- Youssef Fadel (born 1949, Morocco, f/d)
- José Fernandes Fafe (1927–2017, Portugal, p/f/nf)
- Ahmed Fagih (1942–2019, Libya/Egypt, f/d/nf)
- Daniel O. Fagunwa (1903–1963, Nigeria, f)
- Diane Fahey (born 1945, Australia, p/nf)
- Jacqueline Fahey (born 1929, N Zealand, nf)
- Fawzia Fahim (born 1931, Egypt, nf)
- Ludwig Fahrenkrog (1867–1952, Germany, nf)
- Harry Fainlight (1935–1982, England/US, p)
- Ruth Fainlight (born 1931, US/England, p/f)
- Thomas Fairfax (1612–1672, England, p/nf)
- Gordon Hamilton Fairley (1930–1975, Australia/England, nf)
- Margaret Fairley (1885–1968, England/Canada, nf)
- Linda Fairstein (born 1947, US, f)
- Faiz Ahmed Faiz (1911–1984, India/Pakistan, p)
- Miled Faiza (born 1974, Tunisia/US, p)
- Doumbi Fakoly (born 1944, Mali/France, f)
- Cristóvão Falcão (c. 1512 – c. 1557, Portugal, p)
- Maria and Harriet Falconar (fl. 1780s, England or Scotland, p)
- María Inés Falconi (born 1954, Argentina, ch)
- Knut Faldbakken (born 1941, Norway, f)
- Matias Faldbakken (born 1973, Denmark/Norway, f/d)
- Adebayo Faleti (1921–2017, Nigeria, d/p/nf)
- Johannes Daniel Falk (1768–1826, Polish Prussia/Germany, p)
- Johan Falkberget (1879–1967, Norway, f/nf)
- Kolbein Falkeid (1933–2021, Norway, p)
- Suzanne Falkiner (born 1952, Australia, nf/f)
- J. Meade Falkner (1858–1932, England, f/p)
- Hugh Falkus (1917–1996, England, nf)
- Khadi Fall (born 1948, Senegal, f)
- Kiné Kirama Fall (born 1934, Senegal, p)
- Hans Fallada (1893–1947, Germany, f), pseudonym of Rudolf Wilhelm Friedrich Ditzen
- Padraic Fallon (1905–1974, Ireland, p/d)
- Toyin Falola (born 1953, Nigeria, nf)
- Christian Falster (1690–1772, Denmark, p/nf)
- Ferenc Faludi (1704–1779, Hungary, f)
- György Faludy (1910–2006, Hungary, p/nf)
- Fan Chengda (范成大, 1126–1193, China, nf/p)
- Fan Chung (金芳蓉, born 1949, China, nf)
- Fan Ye (范曄, 398–445/446, China, nf)
- Juraj Fándly (1750–1811, Austria-Hungary, nf)
- Julian Fane (1927–2009, England, f/nf/d)
- Margaret Fane (1887–1962, Australia, f)
- Mildmay Fane (1602–1666, England, d)
- Violet Fane (1843–1905, England, p), pseudonym of Lady Mary Montgomerie Currie
- Fang Fang (方方, born 1955, China, p/f/nf)
- Fang Xuanling (房玄齡, 579–648, China, nf)
- Ronald Fangen (1895–1946, Norway, f/nf/d)
- Sölvi Fannar (born 1971, Iceland, nf/p)
- Frantz Fanon (1925–1961, Martinique/US, nf)
- Ann, Lady Fanshawe (1625–1680, England, nf)
- Catherine Maria Fanshawe (1765–1834, England, p)
- Richard Fanshawe (1608–1666, England, nf)
- Simon Fanshawe (born 1956, England, nf)
- John Fante (1909–1983, US, f)
- U. A. Fanthorpe (1929–2009, England, p)
- Ladislas Farago (1906–1980, Hungary/US, nf)
- Cristina Ali Farah (born 1973, Italy, f/nf)
- Nuruddin Farah (born 1945, Somalia/S Africa, f/d)
- Anthony Faramus (1920–1990, Jersey/England, nf)
- Myrddin Fardd (1836–1921, nf), pseudonym of John Jones
- John Fardell (born 1967, ch)
- Nabile Farès (1940–2016, Algeria/France, f)
- Léon-Paul Fargue (1876–1947, France, p/nf)
- Rosa Lobato de Faria (1932–2010, Portugal, f/p/d)
- Joseph Farington (1747–1821, England, nf)
- Helen Farish (born 1962, England, p)
- Benjamin Farjeon (1838–1903, England, f/d/nf)
- Eleanor Farjeon (1881–1965, England, ch/d/p)
- Herbert Farjeon (1887–1945, England, d/p)
- Joseph Jefferson Farjeon (1883–1955, England, f/d)
- Paul Farley (born 1965, England, p/d/nf)
- Walter Farley (1815–1889, US, ch)
- Beverley Farmer (1941–2018, Australia, f/nf)
- Nancy Farmer (born 1941, US, ch/f)
- Penelope Farmer (born 1939, England, ch)
- Philip José Farmer (1918–2009, US, f)
- Thomas Farnaby (c. 1575–1647, England, nf)
- Nigel Farndale (born 1964, England, f/nf)
- Jeffery Farnol (1878–1952, England, f/nf)
- Musharraf Ali Farooqi (born 1968, Pakistan, f/ch/nf)
- Fadhila El Farouk (born 1967, Algeria, nf), pseudonym of Fadhila Melkemi
- Nabil Farouk (1956–2020, Egypt, f)
- Florence Farr (1860–1917, England, nf/f)
- Frederic Farrar (1831–1903, England, nf/f)
- Stewart Farrar (1916–2000, England, d/f/nf)
- Fiona Farrell (born 1947, N Zealand, p/f/d)
- J. G. Farrell (1935–1979, England/Ireland, f)
- John Farrell (1851–1904, Argentina/Australia, p)
- John Farrell (1968–2010, US, p)
- Kathleen Farrell (1912–1999, England, f)
- Michael Farrell (born 1965, p)
- Forugh Farrokhzad (1934–1967, Iran, p/nf)
- Angie Farrow (born 1951, N Zealand, nf)
- G. E. Farrow (1862–1919, England, ch)
- Rainer Werner Fassbinder (1945–1982, Germany, d/nf)
- Adélaïde Fassinou (born 1955, Benin, f)
- Howard Fast (1914–2003, US, f/p/d)
- Kåre Fasting (1907–1983, Norway, f/nf)
- Sherko Fatah (born 1964, Germany, f)
- Tarek Fatah (born 1949, Pakistan/Canada, nf)
- Gertrude Minnie Faulding (1875–1961, ch/f/nf)
- Mary Faulkner (1903–1973, S Africa, f), pseudonym of Kathleen Lindsay
- William Faulkner (1897–1962, US, f/p/nf)
- Sebastian Faulks (born 1953, England, f)
- Jörg Fauser (1944–1987, Germany, f/d)
- Beatrice Faust (1939–2019, Australia, nf)
- Joseph Fawcett (c. 1758–1804, England, p/nf)
- Millicent Fawcett (1847–1929, England, nf)
- Francis Fawkes (1720–1777, England, p/nf)
- András Fáy (1786–1864, Hungary, p/f/d)
- Eliza Fay (1755 or 1756–1816, England, nf)
- Jean-Pierre Faye (1925–2026, France, f/nf/p)
- Jean-François Leriget de La Faye (1674–1731, France, f)
- Louis Diène Faye (born 1936, Senegal, nf)
- Madame de La Fayette (1634–1693, France, f)
- Mihály Fazekas (1766–1828, Hungary, p/nf)

== Fe–Ff ==
- Jane Fearon (1654 or 1656–1737, England, nf)
- Jane Feather (born 1945, England/US, f)
- Daniel Featley (1582–1645, England, nf)
- Vicki Feaver (born 1943, England, p)
- Logan February (born 1999, Nigeria, p/nf)
- Constance Fecher (1911–1995, England, f), pseudonym of Constance Fecher Heaven
- Gustav Fechner (1801–1887, Germany, nf), pseudonym Dr. Mises
- Heinrich Federer (1866–1928, Switzerland, f/nf/p)
- Tim Federle (born 1980, US, nf/d)
- Wayne Federman (born 1959, US, nf)
- Jürg Federspiel (1931–2007, Switzerland, f)
- Klára Fehér (1919–1996, Hungary, nf/f/ch)
- Lopito Feijóo (born 1963, Angola, p)
- José Pablo Feinmann (1943–2021, Argentina, f/d/nf)
- Elaine Feinstein (1930–2019, England, p/f/d)
- David Feintuch (1944–2006, US, f)
- Raymond Feist (born 1945, US, f)
- Bu Feiyan (步非烟, born 1981, China, f), pseudonym of Xin Xiaojuan (辛晓娟)
- István Fekete (1900–1970, Hungary, ch/f)
- Else Feldmann (1884–1942, Austria, f/d/p), Holocaust victim
- Alison Fell (born 1944, Scotland, p/f)
- John Fell (1625–1686, England, nf)
- Károly Fellinger (born 1963, Czechoslovakia/Slovakia, p/nf)
- Mary Fels (1863–1953, Germany/US, nf)
- Owen Feltham (1602–1668, England, nf)
- Kurt Feltz (1910–1982, Germany/Spain, f)
- Jonathan Fenby (born 1942, England, nf)
- Feng Jicai (馮驥才, born 1942, China, f/nf)
- Feng Menglong (馮夢龍, 1574–1646, China, nf/f/p)
- Feng Yidai (馮亦代, 1913–2005, China, nf)
- Feng Youlan (馮友蘭, 1895–1990, China, nf)
- Feng Yuanjun (冯沅君, 1900–1974, China, nf)
- Fenggan (豐干, fl. 9th c., China, nf)
- Forrest Fenn (1930–2020, US, f)
- George Manville Fenn (1831–1909, England, f/nf/ch)
- John Fenn (died 1615, England, nf)
- John Fenn (1739–1794, England, nf)
- Lionel Fenn (1942–2006, US, f)
- Achour Fenni (living, Algeria, p/nf)
- Beppe Fenoglio (1922–1963, Italy, f/d)
- Elijah Fenton (1683–1730, England, p/nf)
- Geoffrey Fenton (c. 1539–1608, England, nf)
- James Fenton (1931–2021, N Ireland, p)
- James Fenton (born 1949, England, p/nf)
- Roger Fenton (1565–1615, England, nf)
- Eliza Fenwick (1767–1840, England/Barbados, f/nf/ch)
- Miksa Fenyő (1877–1972, Hungary, nf)
- Mouloud Feraoun (1913–1962, Algeria, nf)
- Edna Ferber (1885–1968, US, f/d)
- Ferdowsi (c. 935/940 – c. 1019/1026, Persia, p)
- Teréz Ferenczy (1823–1853, Austria-Hungary, p)
- Kitty Ferguson (born 1941, US, nf)
- Ruby Ferguson (1899–1966, England, f/ch), pseudonym RC Ashby
- Sarah Ferguson (born 1965, Australia/US, nf)
- Bernard Fergusson (1911–1980, nf)
- Robert Fergusson (1750–1774, Scotland, p)
- Halima Ferhat (born 1941, Morocco, nf)
- Nils Ferlin (1898–1961, Sweden, p)
- Lawrence Ferlinghetti (1919–2021, US, p/f/nf)
- Patrick Leigh Fermor (1915–2011, England, nf)
- Fanny Fern (1811–1872, US, f/ch/nf), born Sara Payson Willis
- Macedonio Fernández (1874–1952, Argentina, f/p/nf)
- Chitra Fernando (1935–1998, Ceylon/Sri Lanka, f/ch)
- Elena Ferrante (living, Italy, f)
- Marie Ferrarella (born 1948, Germany/US, f)
- Gabriella De Ferrari (born 1941, US, nf)
- Elizabeth Ferrars (1907–1995, Burma/England, f), pseudonym of Morna Doris MacTaggart
- Léo Ferré (1916–1993, Monaco/Italy, p)
- Rosario Ferré (1938–2016, Puerto Rico, f/nf/p)
- António Ferreira (1528–1569, Portugal, p/d)
- Isabel Ferreira (born 1958, Angola, nf)
- José Gomes Ferreira (1900–1985, Portugal, p/f)
- Vergílio Ferreira (1916–1996, Portugal, f/nf)
- Susan Edmonstone Ferrier (1782–1854, Scotland, f)
- Helen Josephine Ferris (1890–1969, US, f)
- Maria Fetherstonhaugh (1847–1918, England, f)
- Omar Fetmouche (born 1955, Algeria, d)
- Touati Fettouma (born 1950, Algeria, f)
- Eduard von Feuchtersleben (1798–1857, Poland/Austria, d/nf/p)
- Lion Feuchtwanger (1884–1958, Germany/US, f/d)
- Malcolm Fewtrell (1909–2005, England, nf)
- Renate Feyl (born 1944, Czechoslovakia/Germany, f/nf)
- Jasper Fforde (born 1961, England, f)
- Katie Fforde (born 1952, England, f)
- I. D. Ffraid (1814–1875, Wales, p/nf)

== Fi–Fl ==
- Ferdinand Kwasi Fiawoo (1891–1969, Gold Coast, nf/d)
- Jerzy Ficowski (1924–2006, Poland, p/nf)
- Eugene Field (1850–1895, US, ch/p/nf)
- Michael Field (Katharine Harris Bradley, 1846–1914, and Edith Emma Cooper, 1862–1913, England, p/d)
- Richard Field (1561–1616, England, nf)
- Daphne Fielding (1904–1997, England, nf)
- Helen Fielding (born 1958, England, f/d)
- Henry Fielding (1707–1754, England, f/d/p)
- Sarah Fielding (1710–1768, England, f/ch)
- Xan Fielding (1918–1991, England, nf), pseudonym of Alexander Percival Wallace
- Celia Fiennes (1662–1741, England, nf)
- William Fiennes (born 1970, England, nf)
- Fanny Carrión de Fierro (born 1936, Ecuador, p/nf)
- Humberto Fierro (1890–1929, Ecuador, p)
- Graeme Fife (born 1946, England, nf/d)
- C. H. S. Fifoot (1899–1975, England/Scotland, nf)
- Eva Figes (1932–2012, Germany/England, f/nf)
- Salvador Reyes Figueroa (1899–1970, Chile, f/nf)
- Margita Figuli (1909–1995, Czechoslovakia/Slovakia, f/nf/ch)
- Adonias Filho (1915–1990, Brazil, f/nf)
- Ernesto Lara Filho (1932–1977, Angola, p/nf)
- Juan de Dios Filiberto (1885–1964, Argentina, p)
- Nicolae Filimon (1819–1865, Wallachia/Romania, f/nf)
- Amanda Filipacchi (born 1967, US, f/nf)
- Emil Filipčič (born 1951, Yugoslavia/Slovenia, f/d)
- Vukašin Filipović (1930–1990, Yugoslavia, nf/f/d)
- Catherine Filloux (living, France/US, d)
- Juan Filloy (1894–2000, Argentina, f/nf)
- Robert Filmer (c. 1588–1653, England, nf)
- Anne Finch, Countess of Winchilsea (1661–1720, England, p)
- Charles Finch (born 1980, US, f)
- Annie Finch (born 1956, US, p/d/nf)
- Brian Finch (1936–2007, England, d)
- William Coles Finch (1864–1944, England, nf)
- Timothy Findley (1930–2002, Canada, f/d)
- Anne Fine (born 1947, England, ch/f)
- Cordelia Fine (born 1975, Canada/England, nf)
- Nadia Fink (born 1977, Argentina, nf/ch)
- Thomas Fink (born 1972, US/England, nf)
- Fiona Finlay (1914–1986, England, f), pseudonym of Violet Vivian Stuart
- George Finlay (1799–1875, Scotland, nf)
- Ian Hamilton Finlay (1925–2006, Scotland, p/nf)
- John Martin Finlay (1941–1991, US, nf/f)
- Martha Finley (1828–1909, US, ch)
- Mitch Finley (born 1945, US, nf)
- Jack Finney (1911–1995, US, f/d)
- Steinunn Finnsdóttir (c. 1640 – c. 1710, Iceland, p)
- Fran Saleški Finžgar (1871–1962, Austrian E/Yugoslavia, f/p/d)
- Carmen Firan (born 1958, Romania/US, p/f/nf)
- Ronald Firbank (1886–1926, England/Italy, f)
- Ruth First (1925–1982, S Africa/Mozambique, nf)
- Charles Firth (1857–1936, England, nf)
- John Rupert Firth (1890–1960, England, nf)
- Tim Firth (born 1964, England, d/p)
- Johann Fischart (c. 1545–1591, Germany, p/f)
- Caroline Auguste Fischer (1764–1842, Germany, f)
- Louis Fischer (1896–1970, US, nf)
- Tibor Fischer (born 1959, England, f)
- Margery Fish (1892–1969, England, nf)
- Tim Fish (born 1970, US, ch/f)
- Timothy Fish (living, US, f/nf)
- A. S. T. Fisher (1906–1989, England, p/nf)
- Aileen Fisher (1906–2002, US, ch/p)
- Allen Fisher (born 1944, England, p)
- Ann Fisher (1719–1778, England, nf)
- Carrie Fisher (1956–2016, US, f/d)
- Catherine Fisher (born 1986, Wales, p/ch)
- Dorothy Canfield Fisher (1879–1958, US, f/nf/ch)
- Herbert William Fisher (1826–1903, England, nf)
- John Fisher (1469–1535, England, nf)
- Jon Fisher (born 1972, US, nf)
- Lala Fisher (1872–1929, Australia, nf)
- M. F. K. Fisher (1908–1992, US, nf)
- Mark Fisher (1968–2017, England, nf)
- Roy Fisher (1930–2017, England, p)
- William Fisher (1780–1852, England, f)
- Nicholas Fisk (1923–2016, England, f/ch), pseudonym of David Higginbottom
- Robert Fisk (1946–2020, England/Ireland, nf)
- Sebastian Fitzek (born 1971, Germany, f/nf)
- Edward Fitzgerald (1809–1883, England, p)
- Helen FitzGerald (born 1966, Australia/Scotland, f)
- F. Scott Fitzgerald (1896–1940, US, f/nf/d)
- John D. Fitzgerald (1907–1988, US, ch/nf)
- Penelope Fitzgerald (1916–2000, England, f/p/nf)
- R. D. Fitzgerald (1902–1987, Australia, p)
- Robert Fitzgerald (1910–1985, p/nf)
- Louise Fitzhugh (1928–1974, US, ch)
- April FitzLyon (1920–1998, England, nf)
- Joseph Fitzmyer (1920–2016, US, nf)
- James Percy FitzPatrick (1862–1931, S Africa, nf/ch)
- Kathleen Fitzpatrick (1905–1990, Australia, nf)
- William Fitzstephen (died c. 1191, England, nf)
- Matthias Flacius (1520–1575, Istria, nf), Croatian name Matija Vlačić Ilirik
- Marjorie Flack (1897–1958, US, ch)
- John Flanagan (1944–2026, Australia, f/ch)
- Roderick Flanagan (1828–1862, Ireland/Australia, p/nf)
- Judith Flanders (born 1959, England, nf)
- Peter Flannery (born 1951, England, d)
- Thomas Flatman (1635–1688, England, p)
- Gustave Flaubert (1821–1880, France, f/nf)
- Konrad Fleck (fl. 13th c., Germany, p)
- James Elroy Flecker (1884–1915, England, f/d/p)
- Richard Flecknoe (c. 1600–1678, England, d/p)
- Paul Fleischman (born 1952, US, ch)
- Sid Fleischman (1920–2010, US, ch/d/f)
- Marieluise Fleißer (1901–1974, Germany, d)
- Abraham Fleming (c. 1552–1607, England, nf/p)
- Cardine Fleming (born 1936, England, f), pseudonym of Anne Mather
- Caroline Fleming (born 1975, Denmark, nf)
- Ian Fleming (1908–1964, England, f)
- Marjorie Fleming (1803–1811, Scotland, ch/nf/p)
- Paul Fleming (1609–1640, Germany, p)
- Peter Fleming (1907–1971, England, nf)
- Louis Fles (1872–1940, Netherlands, nf), pseudonym Dr. W. Bottema C. Az.
- Beryl Fletcher (1938–2018, N Zealand, f)
- Giles Fletcher (c. 1586–1623, England, p)
- Giles Fletcher the Elder (1548–1611, England, p)
- J. S. Fletcher (1863–1935, England, f/nf)
- Jane Fletcher (1870–1956, Australia, nf/f)
- John Fletcher (1579–1625, England, d)
- John Gould Fletcher (1886–1960, US, p)
- Lisa Anne Fletcher (1844–1905, US, p/nf)
- Mary Bosanquet Fletcher (1739–1815, England, nf)
- Phineas Fletcher (1582–1650, England, p/nf)
- Susan Fletcher (born 1979, England, f)
- Thomas Fletcher (1666–1713, England, p)
- Olaf de Fleur (born 1975, Iceland, d), pseudonym of Ólafur Jóhannesson
- Maria De Fleury (fl. 1773–1791, England, p/nf)
- Antony Flew (1923–2010, England, nf)
- Robert Newton Flew (1886–1962, England, nf)
- Walter Flex (1887–1917, Germany/Russian E, f)
- Eric Flint (born 1947, US, f)
- F. S. Flint (1885–1960, England, p)
- Kjartan Fløgstad (born 1944, Norway, p/f)
- Malva Flores (born 1961, Mexico, p/f/nf)
- Marco Antonio Flores (1937–2013, Guatemala, p/f/nf)
- Filip Florian (born 1968, Romania, f)
- John Florio (1552–1625, England, p/nf)
- Pat Flower (1914–1977, England/Australia, d/f)
- Tui Flower (1925–2017, N Zealand, nf)
- Alice Flowerdew (1759–1830, England, p)
- R. Barri Flowers (born 1956, US, f/nf)
- John Floyd (1572–1649, England/France, nf)
- Robert Fludd (1574–1637, England, nf)
- Torbjörn Flygt (born 1964, Sweden, f)
- Chris Flynn (born 1972, Australia, f)
- Michael Flynn (born 1947, US, nf)

== Fo ==
- Gorch Fock (1880–1916, Germany, f/p/d), pseudonym of Johann Wilhelm Kinau
- Giles Foden (born 1967, England, f)
- Usman dan Fodio (1754–1815, Hausa Kingdoms, nf)
- Aïcha Fofana (1957–2003, Mali, f/nf)
- Lionel Fogarty (1958–2026, Australia, p)
- Antonio Fogazzaro (1842–1911, Italy, f/nf/d)
- Per Anders Fogelström (1917–1998, Sweden, f)
- Rodolfo Enrique Fogwill (1941–2010, Argentina, f/p)
- Jolán Földes (1902–1963, Hungary/England, f/d), also Yolanda Foldes
- Winifred Foley (1914–2009, England, nf)
- Jean Follain (1903–1971, France, nf/p)
- Ken Follett (born 1949, Wales/England, f)
- Hans Folz (c. 1437–1513, Germany, p/d)
- Rufino Blanco Fombona (1874–1944, Venezuela, nf)
- Albany Fonblanque (1793–1872, England, nf)
- Mikkjel Fønhus (1894–1973, Norway, f/nf)
- Manuel da Fonseca (1911–1993, Portugal, f)
- Rubem Fonseca (1925–2020, Brazil, f)
- Jean de La Fontaine (1621–1695, France, f/p)
- Roberto Fontanarrosa (1944–2007, Argentina, f)
- Theodor Fontane (1819–1898, Germany, nf/f)
- Narbal Fontes (1899–1960, Brazil, f)
- Philippa Foot (1920–2010, England, nf)
- Mary Hallock Foote (1847–1938, US, f/nf)
- Samuel Foote (1720–1777, England, d)
- Tim Footman (born 1968, England, nf)
- Mary Hannay Foott (1846–1918, Scotland/Australia, p)
- Lady Angela Forbes (1876–1950, England/Jersey, f)
- Colin Forbes (1923–2006, England, f), pseudonym of Raymond Harold Sawkins
- Duncan Forbes (1798–1868, Scotland, nf)
- Duncan Forbes (1922–1994, Scotland, nf)
- Duncan Forbes (born 1947, England, p)
- Edward Forbes (1815–1854, Isle of Man, nf)
- Esther Forbes (1891–1967, US, f/nf/ch)
- John Forbes (1950–1998, Australia, p)
- Carolyn Forché (born 1950, US, p/nf)
- Anne Ford (1737–1824, England, nf)
- Boris Ford (1917–1998, India/England, nf)
- Elbur Ford (1906–1993, England, f), pseudonym of Eleanor Burford Hibbert
- Ford Madox Ford (1873–1939, England, f/p/nf), born Joseph Leopold Ford Hermann Madox Hueffer
- John Ford (1586 – c. 1639, England, d/p)
- John M. Ford (1957–2006, US, f/p)
- Mark Ford (born 1962, Kenya/England, p/nf)
- Norrey Ford (1907–1985, England, f), pseudonym of Norren Dilcock
- Richard Ford (1796–1858, England, nf)
- Thomas Ford (c. 1580–1648, England, p)
- Amanda Foreman (born 1968, England/US, nf)
- Michael Foreman (born 1938, England, ch)
- Antonia Forest (1915–2003, England, ch), pseudonym of Patricia Giulia Caulfield Kate Rubinstein
- C. S. Forester (1899–1966, England/US, f/d/nf)
- Simon Forman (1552–1611, England, nf)
- Juan Forn (1959–2021, Argentina, f/nf)
- Aminatta Forna (born 1964, Scotland/Sierra Leone, f/nf)
- Xavier Forneret (1809–1884, France, f/d/nf)
- Richard Forno (living, US, nf)
- Fereshteh Forough (born 1985, Iran/Afghanistan, nf)
- David Forrest, 1929–2023 and born 1933, England, f), pseudonym of Robert Forrest-Webb and David Eliades)
- Mabel Forrest (1872–1935, Australia, p/f)
- Elaine Forrestal (born 1941, Australia, ch)
- Alfred Henry Forrester (1804–1872, England, f/ch)
- Helen Forrester (1919–2011, England/Canada, nf/f)
- Tony Forrester (born 1953, England, nf)
- Jeff Forshaw (born 1968, England, nf)
- Thelma Forshaw (1923–1995, Australia, f/nf)
- Lars Forssell (1928–2007, Sweden, p/d)
- Tua Forsström (born 1947, Finland/Sweden, p)
- William R. Forstchen (born 1950, US, f/nf)
- E. M. Forster (1879–1970, England, f/nf/d)
- Jackie Forster (1926–1998, England, nf)
- John Forster (1812–1876, England, nf)
- Margaret Forster (1938–2016, England, f/nf)
- Mary Forster (c. 1620–1687, England, nf)
- Michelanne Forster (born 1953, N Zealand, d)
- William Forster (1818–1882, India/Australia, p)
- Frederick Forsyth (born 1938, England, f)
- Jessie Forsyth (1847/49 – 1937, England/US/Australia, nf/f/p)
- Paul Fort (1872–1960, France, p)
- Richard Fortey (born 1946, England, nf)
- Drew Fortier (born 1987, US, nf)
- Elena Fortún (1886–1952, Spain, ch)
- Mary Fortune (c. 1833–1911, Australia, f/p/nf), pseudonym Waif Wander
- Valentin Fortunov (1957–2014, Bulgaria, nf)
- Robert L. Forward (1932–2002, US, nf/f)
- Ugo Foscolo (1778–1827, Italy, p/f/d)
- Jon Fosse (born 1959, Norway, f/p/ch)
- Karin Fossum (born 1954, Norway, f)
- Alan Dean Foster (born 1946, US, f)
- E. M. Foster (fl. late 18th – early 19th c., England, f)
- John Foster (1770–1843, England, nf)
- Lori Foster (living, US, f)
- Lynn Foster (1914–1985, Australia, d/nf)
- Mo Foster (born 1944, England, nf)
- John Fothergill (1876–1957, England, nf)
- John Knight Fotheringham (1874–1936, England, nf)
- Michel Foucault (1926–1984, France, nf)
- John Foulcher (born 1952, Australia, p)
- Adam Foulds (born 1974, England, f/p)
- Tim Fountain (born 1967, England, d/nf)
- Margaret Fountaine (1862–1940, England, nf)
- Friedrich de la Motte Fouqué (1777–1843, Germany, d/p)
- Charles J. Fourie (born 1965, S Africa, d)
- Alain-Fournier (1886–1914, France, f/p), pseudonym of Henri-Alban Fournier
- Martha Fowke (1689–1736, England, p)
- Dorothy Fowler (living, N Zealand, f)
- Ellen Thorneycroft Fowler (1860–1929, England, f/p/ch)
- Francis George Fowler (1871–1918, England/Guernsey, nf)
- Henry Watson Fowler (1858–1933, England, nf)
- Karen Joy Fowler (born 1950, US, f)
- William Fowler (c. 1560–1612, Scotland, p/nf)
- John Fowles (1926–2005, England, f/d)
- Aileen Fox (1907–2005, England, nf)
- Caroline Fox (1819–1871, England, nf)
- Francis Fox (1675–1738, England, nf)
- George Fox (1624–1691, England, nf)
- Helen Fox (born 1962, England, ch)
- Len Fox (1905–2004, Australia, nf)
- Mem Fox (born 1946, Australia, ch)
- Michael J. Fox (born 1961, Canada/US, nf)
- Robert Fox (1798–1843, England, nf)
- Robert J. Fox (1927–2009, US, nf)
- Robin Lane Fox (born 1946, England, nf)
- Edgar Foxall (1906–1990, England, p)
- John Foxe (1516/1517–1587, England, nf)
- Samuel Foxe (1560–1630, England, nf)

== Fr–Fy ==
- Randall Frakes (living, US, d/f)
- Esther G. Frame (1840–1920, US, nf)
- Janet Frame (1924–2004, N Zealand, f/p/ch)
- Martin le Franc (c. 1410–1461, France/Switzerland, p)
- Anatole France (1844–1924, France, p/nf/f)
- Marie de France (fl. 12th c.), France/England, p)
- Ruth France (1913–1968, N Zealand, p/f)
- Anne Francis (1738–1800, England, nf/p)
- Dick Francis (1920–2010, England, f)
- Gavin Francis (born 1975, Scotland, nf)
- Matthew Francis (born 1956, England/Wales, p/f)
- Philip Francis (1740–1818, Ireland/England, nf)
- Robert Francis (1901–1987, US, p/nf)
- Suzanne Francis (born 1959, England, f)
- Julia Franck (born 1970, Germany, f/nf)
- Sebastian Franck (1499 – c. 1543, Germany, nf)
- Veronica Franco (1546–1591, Republic of Venice, p/nf)
- Anne Frank (1929–1945, Germany/Netherlands, nf), Holocaust victim
- Bruno Frank (1878–1945, Germany/US, d/f/p)
- Leonhard Frank (1882–1961, Germany/US, f/d)
- Gilbert Frankau (1884–1952, England, f/p)
- Julia Frankau (1859–1916, England, f), pseudonym Frank Danby
- Pamela Frankau (1908–1967, England, f)
- Alona Frankel (born 1937, Poland/Israel, ch/p)
- Neville Frankel (born 1948, South Africa/United States)
- Charis Frankenburg (1892–1985, England, nf)
- Frankétienne (born 1936, Haiti, p/f/d), born Franck Étienne
- Ludwig August Frankl von Hochwart (1810–1894, Austrian Empire, p)
- Benjamin Franklin (1706–1790, English N American colonies/US, nf)
- John Franklin (1886–1947, England/Canada, nf)
- Miles Franklin (1879–1954, Australia, f/nf), pseudonym of Stella Maria Sarah Miles Franklin
- André Franquin (1924–1997, Belgium, f)
- Marie-Louise von Franz (1915–1998, Switzerland, nf)
- Franzobel (born 1967, Austria, p/f), pseudonym of Franz Stefan Griebl
- Karl Emil Franzos (1848–1904, Austrian E/Germany, f)
- Antonia Fraser (born 1932, England, nf/f)
- Caro Fraser (1953–2020, England, f)
- George MacDonald Fraser (1925–2008, England/Isle of Man, f/d)
- George Sutherland Fraser (1915–1980, Scotland, p/nf)
- Gregory Fraser (living, US, p)
- Ian Fraser, Baron Fraser of Lonsdale (1897–1974, England, nf)
- Margaret Fraser (1866–1951, N Zealand, nf)
- Mary Crawford Fraser (1851–1922, Italy/US, nf/f)
- Raymond Fraser (1941–2018, Canada, nf/f/p)
- Naim Frashëri (1846–1900, Ottoman E, nf/p)
- Benjamin Frater (1979–2007, Australia, p)
- Heinrich Frauenlob (c. 1250/1260–1318, Germany, p)
- Abraham Fraunce (c. 1558/1560 – c. 1592/1593, England, p)
- Michael Frayn (born 1933, England, d/f)
- Brentley Frazer (born 1972, Australia, p/nf/f)
- Margaret Frazer (1946–2013, US, f)
- Ian Frazier (born 1951, US, nf)
- Louis-Honoré Fréchette (1839–1908, Canada, p/d/f)
- Pauline Fréchette (1889–1943, Canada, p/d/nf)
- André Frédérique (1915–1957, France, p)
- Marianne Fredriksson (1927–2007, Sweden, f/nf)
- Aleksander Fredro (1793–187t, Poland, p/d/nf)
- Lynn Freed (born 1945, S Africa, f/nf)
- Jonathan Freedland (born 1967, England, nf/f), fiction pseudonym Sam Bourne
- Russell Freedman (1929–2018, US, nf/ch)
- Barbara C. Freeman (1906–1999, England, ch)
- Don Freeman (1908–1978, US, ch)
- Douglas S. Freeman (1886–1953, US, nf)
- Edward Augustus Freeman (1823–1892, England/Spain, nf)
- Grace Beacham Freeman (1916–2002, US, p/nf/f)
- John Freeman (1880–1929, England, p/nf)
- Pamela Freeman (born 1960, Australia, f/ch)
- R. Austin Freeman (1862–1943, England, f)
- Dave Freer (born 1959, S Africa/Australia, f)
- Nicholas Freeston (1907–1978, England, p)
- Alicia Freilich (born 1939, Venezuela, f/nf)
- Ferdinand Freiligrath (1810–1876, Germany, p/nf)
- Raquel Freire (born 1973, Portugal, d/f)
- António A. de Freitas (born 1947, Mozambique/Portugal, nf)
- Armindo Freitas-Magalhães (born 1966, Portugal, nf)
- Elizabeth Freke (1641–1714, England, nf/p)
- Jasmin B. Frelih (born 1986, Yugoslavia/Slovenia, f)
- Elizabeth Wynne Fremantle (1778–1857, England, nf)
- Celia Fremlin (1914–2009, England, f)
- Allen French (1870–1946, US, nf/ch)
- Anne French (born 1956, N Zealand, p)
- Ashley French (1897–1985, England, f/d), pseudonym of Denise Robins
- Jackie French (born 1953, Australia, nf/ch)
- Patrick French (born 1966, England, nf)
- Tana French (born 1973, United States/Ireland, f)
- Gustav Frenssen (1863–1945, Germany, f)
- John Hookham Frere (1769–1846, England, p)
- Rodrigo Fresán (born 1963, Argentina/Spain, f/nf)
- Yvonne du Fresne (1929–2011, N Zealand, f/d)
- James Frey (born 1969, US, nf/f)
- Oskar Freysinger (born 1960, Switzerland, nf/f)
- Sindri Freysson (born 1970, Iceland, f/p)
- Gustav Freytag (1816–1895, Germany, f/d)
- Alfred Hermann Fried (1864–1921, Germany, nf)
- Erich Fried (1921–1988, Austria/England, p/d/f)
- Johannes Fried (1942–2026, Germany, nf)
- Leonie Frieda (born 1956, Sweden/England, nf)
- Egon Friedell (1878–1938, Austria, nf/d), Holocaust victim
- Frieda Friedman (born 1905, date of death unknown, US, ch)
- Joseph Friedenson (1922–2013, Poland/US, nf)
- C. S. Friedman (born 1957, US, f)
- David D. Friedman (born 1945, US, nf)
- Graeme Friedman (living, S Africa, f/p)
- Richard Elliott Friedman (born 1946, US, nf)
- Brian Friel (1929–2015, Ireland, d/f)
- Rogelio Julio Frigerio (1914–2006, Argentina, nf)
- Frik (fl. 13th–14th cc., Armenia, nf)
- Shirley Frimpong-Manso (born 1977, Ghana, d/nf)
- Max Frisch (1911–1991, Switzerland, d/f)
- Barbara Frischmuth (1941–2025, Austria, f/ch/d)
- William Powell Frith (1819–1909, England, nf)
- Nikolaj Frobenius (born 1965, Norway, f/d)
- Gustaf Fröding (1860–1911, Sweden, p/f)
- Gayleen Froese (born 1972, Canada, f/nf/p)
- Abraham Emanuel Fröhlich (1796–1865, Switzerland, p)
- Jean Froissart (c. 1337 – c. 1405, Flanders, nf/p)
- Robert Frost (1874–1963, US, p)
- Helen Losanitch Frothingham (1885–1972, Serbia/France, nf)
- James Anthony Froude (1818–1894, England, nf/f)
- Hurrell Froude (1803–1836, England, nf)
- Alistair Fruish (living, England, nf/f)
- Gene Frumkin (1928–2007, US, p)
- C. B. Fry (1872–1956, England, nf)
- Caroline Fry (1787–1846, England, nf)
- Christopher Fry (1907–2005, England, p/d)
- Plantagenet Somerset Fry (1931–1996, England, nf)
- Ruth Fry (1878–1962, England, nf)
- Stephen Fry (born 1957, England, d/f/nf)
- Susanna M. D. Fry (1841–1920, US, f/nf)
- Agnes Moore Fryberger (1868–1939, US, f)
- Fu Baoshi (傅抱石, 1904–1965, China, nf)
- Fu Shanxiang (傅善祥, 1833–1864, China, nf)
- Fu Tianlin (傅天琳, born 1946, China, p/nf)
- Carlos Fuentes (1928–2012, Mexico, f/nf)
- Athol Fugard (born 1932, S Africa, d/f)
- Lisa Fugard (living, S Africa/US, f)
- Sheila Meiring Fugard (born England/S Africa, f/d)
- Alberto Fuguet (born 1963, Chile, f/nf)
- Shizuo Fujieda (藤枝静男, 1907–1993, Japan, f)
- Sadakazu Fujii (藤井貞和, born 1942, Japan, p/nf)
- Shū Fujisawa (藤沢周, born 1959, Japan, f)
- Yoshinaga Fujita (藤田宜永, 1950–2020, Japan, f/d)
- Fujiwara no Akisue (藤原顕季, 1055–1123, Japan, p)
- Fujiwara no Ietaka (藤原家隆, 1158–1237, Japan, p)
- Fujiwara no Kintō (藤原公任, 966–1041, Japan, p)
- Fujiwara no Shunzei (藤原俊成, 1114–1204, Japan, p)
- Fujiwara no Teika (藤原定家, 1162–1241, Japan, p/f/nf)
- Kyūya Fukada (深田久弥), 1903–1971, Japan, f/nf)
- Shichirō Fukazawa (深沢七郎), 1914–1987, Japan, f)
- Fukuchi Gen'ichirō (福地源一郎, 1841–1906, Japan, nf)
- Fukuda Hideko (福田英子, 1865–1927, Japan, nf)
- Sadayoshi Fukuda (福田定良, 1917–2002, Japan, nf)
- Masami Fukushima (福島正実, 1929–1976, Japan, f)
- Fukuzawa Yukichi (福澤諭吉, 1835–1901, Japan, nf/ch)
- Yvonne K. Fulbright (living, Iceland/US, nf)
- George Williams Fulcher (1795–1855, England, p/nf)
- Ludwig Fulda (1862–1939, Germany, d/p)
- Robert Fulghum (born 1937, US, nf)
- Alexandra Fuller (born 1969, England/US, nf)
- Andrew Fuller (1754–1815, England, nf)
- Claire Fuller (born 1967, England, f)
- Jean Overton Fuller (1915–2009, England, nf)
- John Fuller (born 1937, US, p/f/ch)
- Peter Fuller (1947–1990, England, nf)
- Roy Fuller (1912–1991, England, p/f/nf)
- Thomas Fuller (1608–1661, England, nf)
- Lady Georgiana Fullerton (1812–1885, England, f/nf)
- Mary Eliza Fullerton (1868–1946, Australia/England, f/p)
- Alice Fulton (born 1952, US, p/f/nf)
- Catherine Fulton (1829–1919, N Zealand, nf)
- Ulpian Fulwell (1545 or 1546 – pre-1586, England, d/p)
- Funahashi Seiichi (舟橋聖一, 1904–1976, Japan, f/d)
- Vicente Cabrera Funes (1944–2014, Ecuador, f/nf)
- Cornelia Funke (born 1958, Germany, ch)
- Bilkisu Funtuwa (living, Nigeria, f)
- Antoine Furetière (1619–1688, France, nf/f)
- Monica Furlong (1930–2003, England, f/ch/nf)
- John Furnival (1933–2020, England, p)
- Frederick James Furnivall (1825–1910, England, nf)
- Yoshikichi Furui (古井由吉, 1937–2020, Japan, f/nf)
- Henry Fuseli (1741–1825, Switzerland/England, nf)
- Sandy Fussell (born 1960, Australia, ch)
- Milán Füst (1888–1967, Hungary, f/nf)
- Futabatei Shimei (二葉亭四迷, 1864–1909, Japan, f/nf)
- Füzuli (c. 1494–1556, Ottoman E, p), birth name Mahammad bin Suleyman
- Simwnt Fychan (c. 1530–1606, Wales, p/nf)
- Rose Fyleman (1877–1957, England, p/ch)
