= Finley (name) =

Male given name and surname

Finley is both a surname and given name. Its meaning is of Scottish origin, from the Gaelic personal name Fionnlagh (Old Irish Findlaech), composed of the elements fionn "white", "fair" (see Finn) + laoch "warrior", "hero", which led many people believe that has been reinforced by an Old Norse personal name composed of the elements "finn" ("Finn") + "leikr" ("fight", "battle", "hero").

Finley is a popular given name both in the United States and the United Kingdom. It is in use for both boys and girls in the United States. It has been more common for boys than girls in the United Kingdom. As of 2017 the name is no longer associated especially with fair-headed people. The name is popular with persons of many ethnic and cultural backgrounds.

Notable people with the name are listed below:

== Surname ==
- A. J. Finley (born 2001), American football player
- Albert Ernest Finley (1870–1923), Canadian physician and political figure
- Amy Finley (born 1973), American cook and writer
- Art Finley (1926–2015), American television and radio personality
- Asa Finley (1788–1853), first elected judge of Arrow Rock, Missouri, 1824
- Ben Finley broadcast journalist who is the Editorial Producer with “Anderson Cooper 360” which broadcasts on CNN
- Bob Finley (1915–1986), American baseball catcher
- Brian Finley (born 1981), Canadian ice hockey player
- Carl A. Finley (1924–2002), American minority owner of the Kansas City A's
- Chad Finley (born 1992), American professional stock car racing driver and team owner
- Charles Finley (politician) (1865–1941), U.S. Representative from Kentucky
- Charles Finley (coach) (1907–1972), college basketball coach for the Idaho Vandals, UTEP Miners, Southern Miss Golden Eagles
- Charles M. Finley (1899–1958), businessman and politician from Philadelphia
- Charlie Finley (1918–1996), businessman and Oakland Athletics owner
- Chuck Finley (born 1962), American baseball pitcher
- Clement Finley (1797–1879), 10th Surgeon General of the United States Army
- David Finley Jr. (born 1958), Northern Irish professional wrestling trainer, producer and former professional wrestler
- David E. Finley (1861–1917), United States Representative from South Carolina
- Diane Finley (born 1957), Canadian politician
- Donna Finley, American politician
- Doug Finley (1946–2013), Canadian politician and Campaign Director for the Conservative Party of Canada during 2006 and 2008 elections
- Ebenezer B. Finley (1833–1916) was a U.S. representative from Ohio, nephew of Stephen Ross Harris
- Eli Finley (born 2004), American football player
- Evelyn Finley (1916–1989), American actress and stuntwoman
- Francis Finley (1882 – c. 1943), British-born Australian rugby union player
- Frank Finley Merriam (186 –1955), the 28th governor of California from 1934 to 1939
- Gary Finley (born 1970), English former professional football central defender and non-league manager
- Gary Wade Finley Jr., American multiple time champion
- Gerald Finley (born 1960), Canadian bass-baritone opera singer
- Gerry Finley-Day (born 1947), Scottish comics writer
- Gregory Finley (born 1984), American actor
- Hala Finley (born 2009), American actress
- Holly Finale' Finley, American professional disc golfer
- Hugh F. Finley (1833–1909), U.S. Representative from Kentucky, father of Charles Finley
- Jack Finley (born 2002), Canadian-American ice hockey player
- James Finley (engineer) (1756–1828), American judge and bridge designer
- James Finley (minister) (1725–1795), American Presbyterian minister
- James I. Finley, American former Deputy Under Secretary of Defense for Acquisition and Technology in the U.S. Department of Defense
- James "John" Finley Gruber (1928–2011), American teacher and early LGBT rights activist
- James Bradley Finley (1781–1856), United States Methodist elder and minister
- Jeanne C. Finley (born 1962) American artist who works with representational media including film, photography, and video
- Jeffrey Finley (born 1991), Canadian football player
- Jermichael Finley (born 1987), American football tight end
- Jesse J. Finley (1812–1904), American member of the United States House of Representatives from Florida and the mayor of Memphis
- Joe Finley (born 1987), American ice hockey player
- John Finley (musician) (born 1945), Canadian singer/songwriter
- John Finley Williamson (1887–1964), American founder of the Westminster Choir and co-founder of Westminster Choir College
- John Huston Finley (1863–1940), American educator
- John "Jack" Lawrence Finley (1935–2006), a United States Navy aviator and astronaut
- John Park Finley (1854–1943), American meteorologist and Army officer; tornado researcher
- Jonathan Finley (born 1972), British-German physicist
- Joseph Cameron Finley (born 1987), American former child actor and molecular biologist
- Julie Finley the United States Ambassador to the Organization for Security and Co-operation in Europe (OSCE)
- Karen Finley (born 1956), American performance artist
- Kelly Rae Finley (born 1985), American basketball coach
- Lucinda Finley (born 1950), American professor and attorney appellant
- Lucy Sherrard Atkinson (née Finley) (1817–1893), English explorer and author who travelled throughout Central Asia and Siberia
- Martha Finley (1828–1909), teacher, author
- Mason Finley (born 1990), American shot putter and discus thrower
- Matt Finley (born 1951), American flugelhorn player and composer of Brazilian jazz
- Michael Finley (born 1973), American basketball player
- Mike Finley (1950–2020), American writer, poet, and videographer
- Mitch Finley (born 1945), American religious writer
- Morgan M. Finley (1925–2016), American politician and businessman
- Moses I. Finley (1912–1986), American and English historian
- Nicholas Finley (born 2005), American professional wrestler better known as Nick Wayne
- Otis E. Finley Sr. (1898–1979), American football coach
- Quinn Finley (born 2004), American ice hockey player
- Robert Finley (1772–1817), American academic, minister and co-organizer of the colonization movement to Liberia
- Robert Finley (musician), American blues and soul singer-songwriter and guitarist.
- Ron Finley, American fashion designer
- Ron Finley (American football), American former football coach
- Ronald Finley[ (1940–2016), American wrestler
- Ruth Finley (1920–2018), American businesswoman who was the founder and publisher of The Fashion Calendar
- Ryan Finley (businessman), American founder of SurveyMonkey, an online survey software provider
- Ryan Finley (soccer) (born 1991), American former professional soccer player
- Ryan Finley (American football) (born 1994), American football player
- Sam Finley (born 1992), English professional football midfielder
- Samuel Finley (1715–1766), American Presbyterian minister and prominent academic
- Samuel Finley Brown Morse (1885–1969), American environmental conservationist and the developer
- Samuel Finley Patterson (1799–1874), American politician, planter, and businessman
- Samuel Finley Vinton (1792–1862), American member of the United States House of Representatives from Ohio
- Stacey Finley, American science professor
- Stephanie A. Finley (born 1966), American judge
- Steve Finley (born 1965), American baseball centerfielder
- Steve Finley (1967–2017), American professional wrestler better known as Buddy Wayne; father of Nick Wayne
- Susan G. Finley, an American researcher and the longest-serving woman in NASA
- T. J. Finley (born 2002), American football player
- William James Finley (1863–1912), American professional baseball player
- William Asa Finley (1839–1912), first president of Oregon State University in the United States
- William Finley (actor) (1940–2012), American actor
- William L. Finley (1876–1953), American wildlife photographer and conservationist
- William Finley (actor), American film actor

== Given name ==
- Finley Duncan (died 1989), American singer who worked with independent record companies in Florida
- Finley Peter Dunne (1867–1936), American writer and humorist
- Finley Lockwood (born 2008), daughter of Lisa Marie Presley and Michael Lockwood
- Finley Potter (born 2004), English footballer
- Finley Quaye (born 1974), Scottish musician
- William Finley Semple (1832–1923), American dentist
