= Fulcher =

Fulcher may refer to:

== Given name ==
- Fulcher of Angoulême (died 1157), Patriarch of Jerusalem
- Fulcher of Chartres (c. 1059–after 1128), a chronicler of the First Crusade

== Surname ==
- Ann S. Fulcher, American abdominal radiologist
- Arthur Fulcher (1855–1932), English yacht racer and cricketer
- Bill Fulcher (1934–2022), American football player and coach
- Byron Fulcher (born 1970), English trombonist
- Christine Fulcher (born 1954), Irish swimmer
- Colin Fulcher, birth name of English graphic artist Barney Bubbles (1942–1983)
- David Fulcher (born 1964), American football player
- Eric Fulcher (1890–1923), English cricketer
- Gabriel Fulcher (born 1969), Irish rugby union footballer
- George Fulcher (disambiguation), multiple people
- Homer Fulcher (1918–1995), American duck decoy carver
- Jonni Fulcher (born 1974), Scottish snooker and pool player
- Kaden Fulcher (born 1998), Canadian ice hockey player
- Lionel Fulcher (1866–1945), British philatelist
- Mondriel Fulcher (born 1976), American football player
- Rich Fulcher (born 1968), American comedy performer
- Russ Fulcher (born 1962), American politician from Idaho

== See also ==
- Fulk, a variant of the given name Fulcher
