= Frankel =

Frankel is a surname. Notable people with the surname include:

- Aerin Frankel (born 1999), American professional ice hockey player
- Benjamin Frankel (1906–1973), British composer
- Bethenny Frankel (born 1970), American chef and reality television personality
- Charles Frankel (1917–1975), American philosopher
- Cyril Frankel (1921–2017), British director
- Dan Frankel (American politician) (born 1956), American politician from Pennsylvania
- Dan Frankel (British politician) (1900–1988), British politician
- Dave Frankel (1957–2025), American attorney, television weatherman and news anchor
- David Frankel (born 1959), American director, editor, screenwriter, and executive producer
- Felice Frankel, American photographer
- Gene Frankel (1919–2005), American theater director
- Jacob Frankel (1808–1887), German-born American rabbi
- Jeffrey Frankel (born 1952), American economist
- Jerry Frankel (1930–2018), American musical theatre producer and thoroughbred breeder and owner
- Jonah Frankel (1928–2012), Hebrew literature professor and author
- Jonah Frankel (businessman) (died 1846), German businessman, banker and philanthropist
- Jonah Teomim-Frankel (1595–1669), author
- Joseph Frankel (musician) (1882–1956), American army band and klezmer bandleader
- Justin Frankel (born 1978), American computer programmer
- Laurie Frankel (born 1973), American novelist, essayist, and public speaker
- Lee K. Frankel (1867–1931), American social worker and insurance executive
- Leó Frankel (1844–1896), Hungarian politician
- Lois Frankel (born 1948), American politician from Florida
- Lois P. Frankel (born 1948), American author and executive coach
- Martin Frankel (born 1954), American financier
- Max Frankel (1930–2025), American journalist and editor
- Naomi Frankel (1918–2009), German-Israeli novelist
- Neville Frankel (born 1948), American author
- Otto Frankel (1900–1998), Australian biologist and geneticist
- Richard B. Frankel, American physicist
- Robert "Bobby" J. Frankel (1941–2009), American thoroughbred race horse trainer
- Sandra Frankel (born 1941), American politician from New York
- Susannah Frankel, British fashion journalist and author
- Susy Frankel, New Zealand law academic
- Stan Frankel (1919–1978), American physicist
- Theodore Frankel (1929–2017), American mathematician
- Tomer Frankel (born 2000), Israeli swimmer
- William Frankel (1903–2008), British newspaper editor
- Zecharias Frankel (1801–1875), Bohemian-German rabbi and historian

== See also ==
- Fränkel
- Frenkel
- Frankl
