= William Finley =

William Finley or Finlay may refer to:

- William Finlay (1853–1914), Irish-born Canadian politician
- William Finlay (mayor) (1840–1885), mayor of Albany, Western Australia
- William Finley (actor) (1940–2012), American actor
- William Finley (Southern Railway), president of the Southern Railway in the United States, 1906–1913
- William A. Finley (1839–1912), president of Oregon State University, 1865–1872
- William L. Finley (1876–1953), American wildlife photographer and conservationist
- William Finlay, 2nd Viscount Finlay (1875–1945), British barrister and judge
- William Henry Finlay, South African astronomer
- Willie Finlay (1926–2014), Scottish footballer for East Fife and Clyde

== Similar spellings ==
- William Findlay (disambiguation)
- William Findley (c. 1741 – 1821), American politician
