= Passport to Danger =

Passport to Danger may refer to:

== Books ==
- Passport to Danger is the title of two novels featuring the Hardy Boys:

Passport to Danger (Nancy Drew/Hardy Boys), a 1993 crossover novel set in Mexico
Passport to Danger (Hardy Boys), a 2003 mystery novel set in Paris

- Passport to Danger by Mary Richmond (novelist) 1938

== Film and TV ==
- Passport to Danger (TV series) with Cesar Romero 1954–1958
