= Ben Finley =

Ben Finley may refer to:

- Ben Finley (American football) (born 2001), American football quarterback
- Ben Finley (journalist), American television journalist
