= Asa Finley =

American politician (1788–1853)

- Born: 1788; Montgomery County, Virginia, United States
- Died: 8 April 1853 (aged 64–65); Nelson, Saline County, Missouri, United States

Asa Finley (1788– 8 April 1853) was a local judge and then state legislator politician in Missouri during early statehood.

== Early life ==
Finley was born in Montgomery County, Virginia, and after marrying his first wife, Esther Gleaves in 1806, they migrated to Christian County, Kentucky and settled on land he had already surveyed for himself in 1803. Migrating to Kentucky with them were Asa Finley's brothers, Dabney Finley and John Pettus Finley.

== Further migration ==
In 1817-1818 Asa Finley, Esther Gleaves Finley, and their children headed for Cooper County, Missouri and settled near the city of Arrow Rock, Missouri. The History of Saline County, Missouri, published in 1881, dates Asa Finley's arrival as early as 1819. However, the deed of the sale of some of their Kentucky land lists him as Asa Finley of Saline County dated September 17, 1818. Saline County, Missouri was made out of part of Cooper County, Missouri in 1820. Migrating with them again was Asa Finley's brother Dabney Finley's family and some of the children of John Pettus Finley's family.

== Political service ==
In 1822 and again in 1826 Asa Finley was elected as Representative of Saline County, Missouri to the Missouri Legislature. In 1824, Asa Finley was elected as the first judge in Arrow Rock. Asa Finley and his wife, Esther Gleaves Finley, also helped found the Salt Fork Cumberland Presbyterian Church, and took turns holding service in their home until it was built.

== Legacy ==
One of Finley's grandsons, William Asa Finley, became the first president of Oregon State University. William Lovell Finley (namesake for William L. Finley National Wildlife Refuge) is also a descendant of Asa Finley.
