= William Findlay =

William Findlay may refer to:

- William Findlay (governor) (1768–1846), governor of Pennsylvania
- William Findlay (cricketer, born 1880) (1880–1953), English cricketer and administrator
- William Findlay (cricketer, born 1896) (1896–1951), English cricketer and officer in the British Army
- William Findlay (soccer) (1904–1981), Scottish-born American footballer
- W. H. Findlay (1911–2006), Scottish photographer
- Willie Findlay (1926–2001), Scottish footballer
- Bill Findlay (Australian footballer) (1913–1986), Australian rules footballer
- Bill Findlay (Scottish footballer) (1900–1949), Scottish footballer
- Bill Findlay (writer) (1947–2005), translator of drama into Scots
- Billy Findlay (born 1970), Scottish footballer

== See also ==
- William Findley (1741–1821), American farmer and politician
- William Finley (disambiguation)
- William Finlay (disambiguation)
- William Findlay Maclean (1854–1929), Canadian politician
- William Findlay Rogers (1820–1899), U.S. Representative
