= George Fulcher =

George Fulcher may refer to:

- George Avis Fulcher (1922–1984), American clergyman of the Roman Catholic Church
- George Williams Fulcher (1795–1855), English poet and miscellaneous writer
