= Gertrud Zwicknagl =

German physicist

Gertrud Zwicknagl is a German solid-state physicist whose research involved the development of renormalized band theory for intermetallic solids and its application to the theory of superconductors and heavy fermion materials, as well as the study of heavy quasiparticles in uranium compounds. Formerly a professor of physics at the Technical University of Braunschweig, she retired in 2020. In 2020 she joined the Max Planck Institute for Chemical Physics of Solids as a Guest Group Leader.

== Education and career ==
After studying physics as an undergraduate at LMU Munich from 1970 to 1975, Zwicknagl continued her studies at the University of Cologne, earning a doctorate (Dr. rer. nat.) in 1979.

She became a researcher at KFA Jülich (now the Forschungszentrum Jülich) from 1976 to 1980, at the Max Planck Institute for Solid State Research in Stuttgart from 1980 to 1986, at the Laboratory of Atomic and Solid State Physics at Cornell University in the US from 1983 to 1984, and at the Institute of Solid State Physics at the Technische Universität Darmstadt from 1986 to 1991. While at Darmstadt she completed a habilitation in 1991.

She returned to the Max Planck Institute for Solid State Research as a senior researcher in 1991, and moved to the Max Planck Institute for the Physics of Complex Systems in Dresden in 1996. In 1998 she took a professorship at the Technical University of Braunschweig, from which she retired in 2020.

== Recognition ==
Zwicknagl was the 1993 recipient of the Walter Schottky Prize of the German Physical Society.

She was named a Fellow of the American Physical Society (APS) in 2023, after a nomination from the APS Division of Condensed Matter Physics, "for original and paramount contributions to the theory of emergent solid-state materials, in particular, for groundbreaking advances toward the quantitative microscopic understanding of strongly correlated systems on the basis of their atomistic and electronic structure".
