= John Fiechter House =

Historic house in Oregon, United States

- U.S. National Register of Historic Places
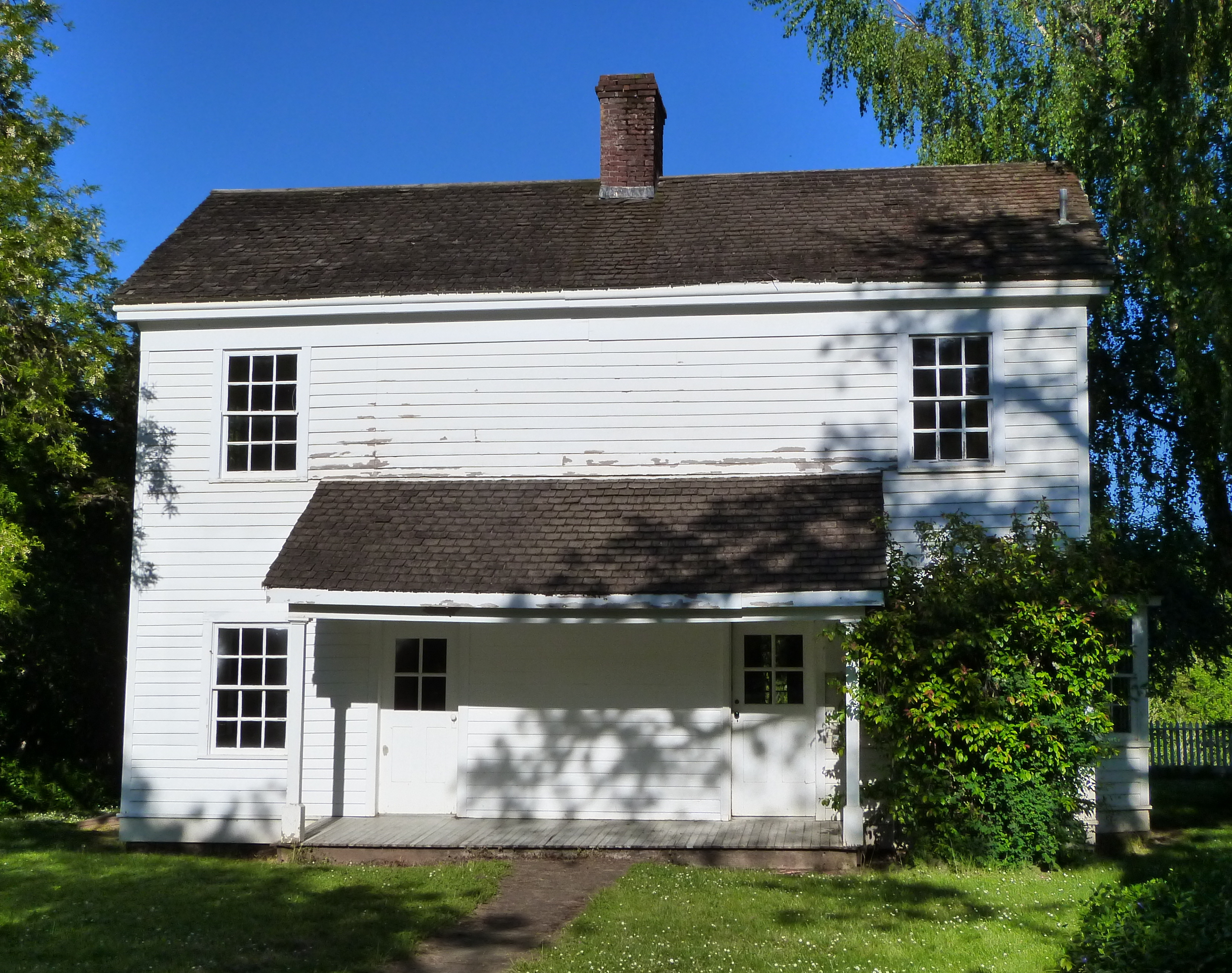
- The Fiechter House in 2016

- Location within Oregon Location within the United States
- Location: Finley Road, William L. Finley National Wildlife Refuge
- Nearest city: Corvallis, Oregon
- Coordinates: 44°25′11″N 123°19′28″W
- Area: 0.26 acres (0.11 ha)
- Built: 1855–1857
- Built by: Abiathar Newton
- Architectural style: Greek Revival
- NRHP reference No.: 85000789
- Added to NRHP: April 11, 1985

The John Fiechter House, also known as Failing Cottage, is a historic house in Benton County, Oregon, United States.

It is believed to be the oldest house in Benton County. It is included in the William L. Finley National Wildlife Refuge.

The house was listed on the National Register of Historic Places in 1985.

== See also ==
- National Register of Historic Places listings in Benton County, Oregon
