= Walter Schottky Prize =

Award of the German Physical Society

The Walter Schottky Prize is a scientific prize awarded by the German Physical Society for outstanding research work of young academics in the field of solid-state physics. Since 1973 the prize is generally awarded annually. The endowment of the prize with 10,000 euros is contributed by Infineon Technologies AG and Robert Bosch GmbH. The prize is dedicated to Walter Schottky, a physicist and pioneer of electronics.

== List of recipients ==
Source: German Physical Society

- 2026: Marcel Reutzel
- 2025: Libor Šmejkal
- 2024: Nicola Paradiso
- 2023: Kai-Qiang Lin
- 2022: Felix Büttner
- 2021: Andreas Hüttel
- 2020: Zhe Wang
- 2019: Eva Vera Benckiser
- 2018: Sascha Schäfer
- 2017: Helmut Schultheiss
- 2016: Ermin Malic
- 2015: Frank Pollmann, Andreas Schnyder
- 2014: Sven Höfling
- 2013: Claus Ropers
- 2012: Alex Greilich
- 2011: not awarded
- 2010: Thomas Seyller
- 2009: Florian Marquardt
- 2008: Fedor Jelezko
- 2007: Jonathan Finley
- 2006: Manfred Fiebig
- 2005: Wolfgang Belzig
- 2004: Markus Morgenstern
- 2003: Jurgen Smet
- 2002: Harald Reichert
- 2001: Manfred Bayer
- 2000: Clemens Bechinger
- 1999: Thomas Herrmannsdörfer
- 1998: Achim Wixforth
- 1997: Christoph Geibel
- 1996: Bo Persson
- 1995: Jochen Feldmann
- 1994: Paul Müller
- 1993: Gertrud Zwicknagl
- 1992: Kurt Kremer
- 1991: Christian Thomsen
- 1990: Hermann Grabert, Helmut Wipf
- 1989: Ulrich Eckern, Gerd Schön, Wilhelm Zwerger
- 1988: Martin Stutzmann
- 1987: Bernd Ewen, Dieter Richter
- 1986: Gerhard Abstreiter
- 1985: Hans Werner Diehl, Siegfried Dietrich
- 1984: Gottfried Döhler
- 1983: Klaus Sattler
- 1982: Volker Dohm, Reinhard Folk
- 1981: Klaus von Klitzing
- 1980: Klaus Funke
- 1979: Heiner Müller-Krumbhaar
- 1978: Bernhard Authier, Horst Fischer
- 1977: Siegfried Hunklinger
- 1976: Franz Wegner
- 1975: Karl-Heinz Zschauer
- 1974: Andreas Otto
- 1973: Peter Ehrhart

== See also ==
- List of physics awards
