= Franz Wegner =

Theoretical Physicist

- Born: 15 June 1940 (age 86)
- Education: Forschungszentrum Jülich; Technical University of Munich
- Known for: Lattice gauge theory Wegner exponent Wegner estimate Wegner orbital model
- Awards: Lars Onsager Prize (2015); Max Planck medal (1986); Walter Schottky Prize (1976)
- Scientific career
- Fields: Statistical Physics
- Workplaces: University of Heidelberg; Brown University
- Thesis: Zum Heisenberg-Modell im paramagnetischen Bereich und am kritischen Punkt (1968)
- Doctoral advisor: Wilhelm Brenig
- Other academic advisors: Leo Kadanoff; Herbert Wagner

Franz Joachim Wegner (born 15 June 1940) is emeritus professor for theoretical physics at the University of Heidelberg.

== Education ==
Franz Wegner attained a doctorate in 1968 with thesis advisor Wilhelm Brenig at the Technical University of Munich with the thesis, "Zum Heisenberg-Modell im paramagnetischen Bereich und am kritischen Punkt" ("On the Heisenberg model within the paramagnetic range and at the critical point").

Subsequently, he did research with a post-doctoral position at Forschungszentrum Jülich, in the group of Herbert Wagner and at Brown University with Leo Kadanoff. Since 1974 he is a professor at Heidelberg University.

== Research ==
The emphasis of Wegner's scientific work is statistical physics, in particular the theory of phase transitions and the renormalization group. The eponymous "Wegner exponent" is of fundamental importance for the purpose of describing corrections to asymptotic scale invariance in close proximity to phase transitions. Wegner also "invented" the foundational lattice gauge theoretical models. The method developed from Wegner's foundational work is nowadays intensively used in simulations of quantum chromodynamics.

== Accolades ==
Wegner won the Walter Schottky prize in 1976 for his work on phase transitions and elementary particles. He has also been elected to the Heidelberger Academy of Sciences and won the Max Planck medal among other awards and recognitions. He won the Lars Onsager prize from American Physical Society in 2015 for his contributions to Statistical mechanics.

== Selected works of Wegner ==
- Wegner, F. J. (1972). "Corrections to scaling laws". Physical Review B. 5 (11): 4529. Bibcode:1972PhRvB...5.4529W. doi:10.1103/PhysRevB.5.4529.
- Wegner, F. (1979). "Mobility edge problem – continuous symmetry and a conjecture". Zeitschrift für Physik B. 35 (3): 207. Bibcode:1979ZPhyB..35..207W. doi:10.1007/BF01319839. S2CID 119653249.
- Wegner, F. (1971). "Duality in Generalized Ising Models and Phase Transitions without Local Order Parameter". J. Math. Phys. 12 (10): 2259–2272. Bibcode:1971JMP....12.2259W. doi:10.1063/1.1665530.

Reprinted in Claudio Rebbi (ed.), Lattice Gauge Theories and Monte Carlo Simulations, World Scientific, Singapore (1983), p. 60–73. (Abstract.)

== See also ==
- Wegner's scaling function
