= Ann S. Fulcher =

American radiologist and academic

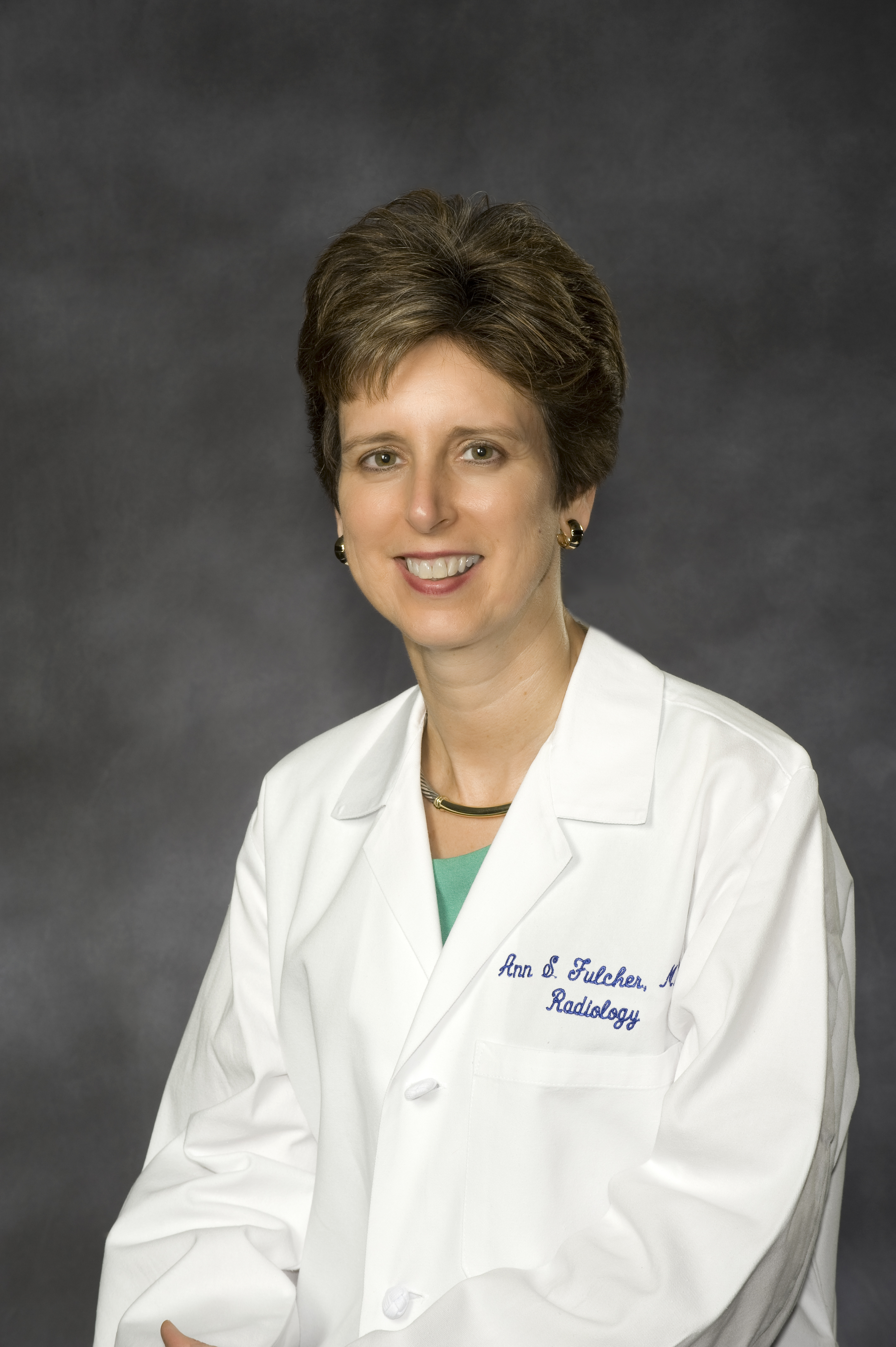
- Occupations: abdominal radiologist, professor and chair

Academic background
- Education: Virginia Commonwealth University/Medical College of Virginia

Ann S. Fulcher is an American abdominal radiologist in the radiology department at Virginia Commonwealth University/Medical College of Medicine (VCU). She serves as a professor and the chair of the department of radiology at VCU.

== Education ==
Fulcher completed her undergraduate training at Westhampton College of the University of Richmond, obtaining a bachelor of science in biology. Afterward, she attended medical school at Virginia Commonwealth University/Medical College of Virginia (VCU) in Richmond, VA under the Health Professions Scholarship Program (HPSP). After completing medical school with honors, she completed a diagnostic radiology residency at VCU, until she began her active duty service in the United States Air Force from 1991 to 1995 at Andrews Air Force Base, MD.

== Career ==
Fulcher held the position of staff radiologist at Andrews Air Force Base from 1991 to 1995 where she also served as an assistant professor at the Uniformed Services University of Health Sciences in Bethesda, MD. During her time at Andrews AFB, Fulcher was also appointed the chief of computed tomography section and body MR and chairperson for the department of radiology. Fulcher's military service also included a highest rank of major being awarded the Meritorious Service Medal in 1995.

Fulcher became an assistant professor in the department of radiology, abdominal imaging section at Medical College of Virginia/VCU. From 1996 to 2001Fulcher was the director of the radiology division in the ambulatory care center at VCU, the director of abdominal MR at VCU from 1997 to 2005, director of the abdominal imaging section at VCU from 2000 and vice-chairman of operations within the department of radiology from 2001 to 2003. Additional academic appointments include the senior deputy editor for the Radiology journal. 2003 is when she was ultimately appointed chair of the department of radiology at VCU along with receiving academic tenure.

== Research ==
Fulcher's research interest includes Magnetic resonance cholangiopancreatography (MRCP), Pelvic MRI, benign and malignant processes of the pelvis and functional imaging of the pancreas with MRI. In addition to numerous peer-reviewed publications, Fulcher's editorial experience includes book chapters, and RSNA teaching files. Fulcher has served as an editorial reviewer for Abdominal Imaging Journal, CardioVascular and Interventional Radiology Journal, Radiology Journal, and Clinical Journal of Gastroenterology.

== Awards ==
- Voted as "Top Doc" in Radiology by Richmond Magazine: 2004, 2008, 2010–2016, 2017 (Top in category), 2019-2020.
- Elected to "Best Doctors in America" by Best Doctors: 2007–2008, 2011–2015, 2017–2020.
- Elected to "Best Doctors" by Virginia Living Magazine: 2018.
- Professional Achievement Award for Women in Science, Dentistry & Medicine: 2005.
- Recipient of Distinguished Resident Award, American Association of Women Radiologists: 1990.
