= Eric Fulcher =

English cricketer (1890–1923)

Personal information
- Full name: Eric Jesser Fulcher
- Born: 12 March 1890; Bearsted, Kent
- Died: 14 February 1923 (aged 32); Llandogo, Monmouthshire
- Batting: Right-handed
- Bowling: Right-arm medium
- Relatives: Arthur Fulcher (father)

Domestic team information
- Years: Team
- 1910–1922: Norfolk
- 1919: Kent
- FC debut: 24 February 1912 Marylebone Cricket Club (MCC) v Argentina
- Last FC: 30 June 1921 MCC v Oxford University

Career statistics
Competition	First-class
Matches	10
Runs scored	329
Batting average	19.35
100s/50s	0/2
Top score	64
Balls bowled	354
Wickets	4
Bowling average	57.00
5 wickets in innings	0
10 wickets in match	0
Best bowling	2/35
Catches/stumpings	9/–
- Source: Cricinfo, 10 March 2017

Eric Jesser Fulcher MC (12 March 1890 – 14 February 1923) was an English cricketer. He played ten first-class matches between 1913 and 1921.

== Early life ==
Fulcher was born at Bearsted in Kent in 1890. His father, Arthur Fulcher, had played cricket for Kent and was a noted yachtsman and his eldest brother, Edward, played cricket for Devon and for Kent's Second XI. Fulcher was educated at Castlemount College in Dover and then at Radley College where he played cricket for the school in 1906 and 1907. He scored over 350 runs and took 51 wickets in his final year at school, and was described as an "outstanding" fielder by Wisden. After leaving school he moved to Attleborough in Norfolk, farming and studying land management.

== Cricket ==
Fulcher played 71 Minor Counties Championship matches for Norfolk County Cricket Club between 1910 and 1922 as an attacking middle-order batsman and change bowler. He toured Argentina with Marylebone Cricket Club (MCC), led by Lord Hawke, in 1912, and played the first of his 10 first-class matches on the tour. He played for LG Robinson's XI at Old Buckingham in Norfolk in both 1913 and 1914. Norfolk won the Minor Counties Championship in 1913 in a rain affected match, Fulcher taking a five-wicket haul to bowl Glamorgan out and ensure Norfolk had a first-innings lead - the method of breaking a tie in the competition.

After the end of the First World War, Fulcher played again at Old Buckingham in May 1919 against the Australian Imperial Force Touring XI. He was part of a team which included several Kent players, and made his first-class county debut in June, playing in four County Championship matches for Kent. His final first-class appearance came for MCC against Oxford University in 1921. His final match for Norfolk was the challenge match to determine the 1922 Minor Counties champions, a match which Norfolk lost to Buckinghamshire, being bowled out for 89 chasing just 98 for victory.

Fulcher scored 2,057 Minor Counties Championship runs for Norfolk at an average of 19.40 runs per innings. He took 64 wickets for the county.

== Military service ==
During World War I Fulcher served in the Royal West Kent Regiment, enlisting in the army in 1914 and being commissioned as a second lieutenant in the RWK by the end of the year. He served in France from 1915 onward, initially with the 1st battalion around Ypres. He was promoted to temporary lieutenant at the end of 1915 and saw action during the closing stages of the Battle of the Somme the following year.

A series of illnesses kept him out of the front line at times throughout the war, and he spent the first half of 1918 away from the battalion before returning in August and was given command of A company, promoted to the rank of captain. Fulcher led the company during the Second Battle of the Somme during August, and was awarded the Military Cross for bravery. He remained at the front through to the end of the war and spent the winter in Belgium before being demobilised in February 1919. He joined the Royal Norfolk Regiment as a captain but resigned his commission in December 1920.

== Family and later life ==
After leaving the military, Fulcher returned to play cricket for Norfolk and joined the board of Norwich City F.C. In 1922 he moved to Monmouthshire and farmed near Chepstow. He died as a result of a shotgun accident in February 1923, aged 32.

== Bibliography ==
- Carlaw, Derek (2020). Kent County Cricketers, A to Z: Part Two (1919–1939) (PDF). Cardiff: ACS.
