= Lois P. Frankel =

American author and expert in organization development (born 1953)

- Born: 1953 (age 72–73); New York City, United States
- Citizenship: American
- Occupations: Executive coach, author, advocate for women and girls
- Known for: Expert in organization development and writing the book Nice Girls Don't Get the Corner Office
- Website: drloisfrankel.com

Lois P. Frankel is an American author, executive coach, and expert in organization development. She is known as the author of the books series starting with Nice Girls Don't Get the Corner Office. She is also the president of Corporate Coaching International.

== Early life and education ==
She was born and raised in New York. In 1973, she graduated with the degrees in Education and Psychology, from SUNY Oswego, and completed her doctorate Counseling Psychology from the University of Southern California. She also received an honorary PhD of humane letters from Phillips Graduate Institute.

== Career ==
She founded two nonprofits: Los Angeles: Motivating Our Students through Experience (MOSTE) and Bloom Again Foundation.

== Books ==
- — (2020). Nice girls don't speak up or stand out : how to make your voice heard, your point known, and your presence felt. Hachette Book Group. ISBN 978-1549103346.
- —; Frohlinger, Carol (2011). Nice girls just don't get it : 99 ways to win the respect you deserve, the success you've earned, and the life you want. Crown Publishers. ISBN 978-0307590480.
- — (2007). See Jane lead : 99 ways for women to take charge at work. Warner Business Books. ISBN 978-0446194815.
- — (2007). Stop sabotaging your career : 8 proven strategies to succeed – in spite of yourself. Warner Business Books. ISBN 978-0446697859.
- — (2005). Nice girls don't get rich : 75 unavoidable mistakes women make with money. Warner Business Books. ISBN 978-0446577090.
- — (2004). Nice girls don't get the corner office : 101 unconscious mistakes women make that sabotage their careers. Warner Business Books. ISBN 978-0446531320.

== Awards and recognition ==
- Woman of the Year Award by Los Angeles County Commission on Women.
- Women Who Empower through Education Award by Maybelline New York.
- Presidential Medal and Distinguished Alumna Award from the State University of New York at Oswego.
