= Gabriella De Ferrari =

American art historian

- Born: Gabriella De Ferrari; 1941 (age 84–85); Tacna, Peru
- Occupations: Writer; art historian

Gabriella De Ferrari is an American art historian, curator, and writer who has worked with and led major arts institutions throughout the United States.

== Background and education ==
Born in Tacna, Peru in 1941 to Italian parents, De Ferrari moved to the United States to attend Saint Louis University in Saint Louis, Missouri, where she graduated with a B.A. in marketing and economics. De Ferrari then earned an M.A. from The Fletcher School of Law and Diplomacy of Tufts University, and an M.A. in art history from Harvard University. After her studies, she became an influential art historian, curator, and administrator at major US art institutions, such as The Institute of Contemporary Art, Boston, where she became director. She moved to New York City in 1989, where she began to write about art, design, and general-interest subjects.

== Art historian and curator ==
De Ferrari served as curator of exhibitions of The Institute of Contemporary Art, Boston, before becoming director of the institute. Later, she became curator of Harvard's Busch-Reisinger Museum, and the assistant director of the Fogg Museum. At the Fogg, she organized courtyard installations of the work of Richard Long, Maria Nordman, Patrick Ireland, and Mary Miss, as well as a James Lee Byars exhibition and the exhibition of the Busch Reisinger Museum Collection at the National Gallery of Art in Washington, D.C.

In 1994, De Ferrari became the founding chair of the board of governors of the Colby College Museum of Art. Under her leadership, the museum's collection added major works by artists Sol LeWitt, Terry Winters, and Richard Serra, among others.

From 2000 to 2006, De Ferrari served as the philanthropic advisor to the chairman and CEO of United Technologies Corporation. Under her guidance, the company was awarded the Americans for the Arts Award for corporate leadership in the arts, as a result of several new arts initiatives, including a public art program that commissioned new works displayed in New York, Boston, and Hartford, and a program that funded exhibitions, including one of Vincent van Gogh’s drawings and one of Jasper Johns’ Grey Paintings at the Metropolitan Museum of Art in New York.

In 2007 and 2008, De Ferrari was creative director of Project Globe 2008 for American Express Publishing and Travel + Leisure magazine. The project commissioned arts and designers to create works in response to the concept of the globe.

== Writer ==
De Ferrari is the author of a novel, a memoir, and numerous articles published in magazines, newspapers, and other periodicals.

Her novel, A Cloud on Sand, was published in 1990 by Alfred A. Knopf. In 1990, Barnes & Noble awarded A Cloud on Sand a Discover Award via its annual “Discover Great New Writers” program. It was also named one of the ten best books of 1990 by Entertainment Weekly and was published in many languages.

In 1994, she published Gringa Latina: A Woman of Two Worlds (Houghton Mifflin), a memoir about growing up as a “gringa” in Peru and then becoming a “Latina” in the United States. The book appeared in many foreign editions.

De Ferrari currently writes for Travel + Leisure magazine, where she is a contributing editor. She has written for them on topics including the artist Richard Serra and the architect Renzo Piano. She has also published short stories and articles in Bomb magazine and has written articles for House & Garden, Connoisseur, and Mirabella. Additionally, she has written for the op-ed page of the New York Times, including a piece on 9/11 and one on private art in public spaces.

== Philanthropy ==
As a result of her extensive activities in the cultural sector, De Ferrari has earned a place on the boards of trustees and advisory boards of numerous cultural and educational institutions. While serving on the board of trustees of the Wadsworth Atheneum Museum of Art in Hartford, Connecticut, De Ferrari was a member of the executive committee and co-chair of the building committee. She served on the board of The New School in New York, where she was the founding chair of The Vera List Center for Art and Politics and chaired the advisory board for the Art Collection and for the Graduate Writing Program. She is also a member of the visiting committee for the Harvard University Art Museums and the visiting committee for the Department of Modern and Contemporary Art at the Metropolitan Museum of Art, New York. She was the founding chair of the advisory board of the Colby College Museum of Art. She is a member of the board of the Bogliasco Foundation in Genoa (Italy) and the Bank Street College of Education in New York, and was chair of the board of Creative Time in New York. She is the chair of the board of the CUNY Graduate Center Foundation. She is a member of the board of Pen America.

== Awards and recognition ==
In 1990, Barnes & Noble awarded A Cloud on Sand a Discover Award

One of the ten best books of 1990 by Entertainment Weekly (A Cloud on Sand) (1990)

The New School Medal for Distinguished Service (1996)

Honorary Doctorate in Letters from Colby College (2008)
