= Jonathan Finley =

- Born: Jonathan James Finley; 20 April 1972 (age 54)
- Education: University of Manchester (BSc); University of Sheffield (PhD)
- Scientific career
- Fields: Semiconductor Optics; Nanophotonics; Quantum Optics; Plasmonics
- Workplaces: University of Sheffield; Max Planck Institute for Quantum Optics; Technical University of Munich
- Thesis: Novel Transport Processes in GaAs-AlGaAs Heterostructures
- Doctoral advisor: Maurice S. Skolnick
- Website: www.professoren.tum.de/en/finley-jonathan/

Jonathan James Finley (born 1972) is a Professor of Physics at the Technical University of Munich in Garching, Germany, where he holds the Chair of Semiconductor Nanostructures and Quantum Systems. His focus is on quantum phenomena in semiconductor nanostructures, photonic materials, dielectric and metallic films, among others, for applications in quantum technology. At such, he made major contributions to the characterization and understanding of the optical, electronic and spintronic properties of quantum dots and wires both from group-IV (Si, SiGe, C) and II-VI materials and oxides (CdSe, ZnO).

== Awards and honours ==
- University of Manchester Prize for Physics (1990, 1991, 1992, 1993)
- Royal Society (London) Junior Fellowship (1998)
- Max Planck Society Research Fellowship (2002)
- DPG Walter Schottky Preis für Festkörperforschung (2007)
- ISCS Young Scientist Prize (2008)
- Golden Chalk (Teaching Award of the TUM Physics Student Council) (2008, 2011, 2012)

== Key publications ==
- Kroutvar, Miro; Ducommun, Yann; Heiss, Dominik; Bichler, Max; Schuh, Dieter; Abstreiter, Gerhard; Finley, Jonathan (2004). "Optically programmable electron spin memory using semiconductor quantum dots". Nature. 432 (7013): 81–4. Bibcode:2004Natur.432...81K. doi:10.1038/nature03008. PMID 15525984. S2CID 2040204.
- Fry, P. W.; Itskevich, I. E.; Mowbray, D. J.; Skolnick, M. S.; Finley, J. J.; Barker, J. A.; O'Reilly, E. P.; Wilson, L. R.; Larkin, I. A.; Maksym, P. A.; Hopkinson, M.; Al-Khafaji, M.; David, J. P. R.; Cullis, A. G.; Hill, G.; Clark, J. C. (2000). "Inverted Electron-Hole Alignment in InAs-GaAs Self-Assembled Quantum Dots" (PDF). Phys. Rev. Lett. 84 (4): 733–6. Bibcode:2000PhRvL..84..733F. doi:10.1103/PhysRevLett.84.733. PMID 11017359.
- Laucht, A.; Hauke, N.; Villas-Bôas, J.M.; Hofbauer, F.; Böhm, G.; Kaniber, M.; Finley, J.J. (2009). "Dephasing of Exciton Polaritons in Photoexcited InGaAs Quantum Dots in GaAs Nanocavities". Phys. Rev. Lett. 103 (8) 087405. arXiv:0904.4759. Bibcode:2009PhRvL.103h7405L. doi:10.1103/PhysRevLett.103.087405. PMID 19792763. S2CID 119107631.
- Krenner, H.J.; Clark, E.C.; Nakaoka, T.; Bichler, M.; Scheurer, C.; Abstreiter, G.; Finley, J.J. (2006). "Optically Probing Spin and Charge Interactions in a Tunable Artificial Molecule" (PDF). Phys. Rev. Lett. 97 (7) 076403. arXiv:cond-mat/0604659. Bibcode:2006PhRvL..97g6403K. doi:10.1103/PhysRevLett.97.076403. PMID 17026254. S2CID 36292988.
- Krenner, H.J.; Sabathil, M.; Clark, E.C.; Kress, A.; Schuh, D.; Bichler, M.; Abstreiter, G.; Finley, J.J. (2006). "Direct Observation of Controlled Coupling in an Individual Quantum Dot Molecule" (PDF). Phys. Rev. Lett. 97 (7) 076403. doi:10.1103/PhysRevLett.97.076403. PMID 17026254. S2CID 36292988.
