= Helen Josephine Ferris =

Helen Josephine Ferris (November 19, 1890 – September 28, 1969) was an American writer and editor in the field of juvenile literature. She served as editor-in-chief of the Junior Literary Guild for 30 years, from 1929–1959.

== Early life and education ==
Ferris was born in Hastings, Nebraska to Elmer E. Ferris (lawyer and pastor) and Minnie (née Lum) Ferris. She earned a Bachelor's of Arts from Vassar College in 1912.

== Life and career ==
Ferris worked as a correspondent for local Poughkeepsie and New Jersey newspapers during her college years. Following college, she edited various periodicals, including the Guardian (1921-1923); the American Girl Scouts magazine, American Girl (1923-1928); and the children's magazine, the Youth's Companion (1928-1929).

Ferris became editor-in-chief of the Junior Literary Guild in 1929 and held that position for 30 years, during which time she worked closely with Eleanor Roosevelt, who served on the Guild's editorial board. Together, Ferris and Roosevelt selected books to send to teenage girls who were members of the Guild. Their collaboration included co-authoring two books focused on improving the lives of young people around the world.

Ferris died of cancer, September 28, 1969.

== Bibliography ==
- Girls's Clubs, Their Organization, and Management: A Manual for Workers. 1918.
- Producing Amateur Entertainments: Varied Stunts and Other Numbers with Program Plans and Directions. 1921.
- Girl Scout Short Stories. 1925.
- Girls Who Did: Stories of Real Girls and their Careers. 1927.
- Adventure Waits. 1929.
- Juliette Low and the Girl Scouts: The Story of an American Woman, 1860-1927, with Anne Hyde Choate. 1928.
- Love Comes Racing. 1929.
- This Happened to Me. 1929.
- When I Was a Girl: The Stories of Five Famous Women as Told by Themselves. 1930.
- Five Girls Who Dared. 1931.
- Here Comes Barnum. 1982.
- Partners: The United Nations and Youth, with Eleanor Roosevelt. 1950.
- Favorite Poems: Old and New. 1957.
- Your Teens and Mine, with Eleanor Roosevelt. 1961.
