= Arthur Fulcher =

English cricketer and yacht racer

Arthur Futcher
Personal information
- Full name: Arthur William Fulcher
- Born: 7 May 1855; Pau, Basses-Pyrénées, France
- Died: 7 May 1932 (aged 77); Bayswater, London, England
- Batting: Right-handed
- Bowling: Right-arm slow
- Role: Batsman
- Relatives: Eric Fulcher (son)

Domestic team information
- Years: Team
- 1878–1887: Kent

Career statistics
Competition	First-class
Matches	7
Runs scored	156
Batting average	14.18
100s/50s	0/0
Top score	44*
Catches/stumpings	2/–
- Source: ESPNcricinfo, 4 January 2012

Arthur William Fulcher (7 May 1855 – 17 May 1932) was an English businessman, soldier, sailor, and cricketer. He played seven first-class cricket matches for Kent County Cricket Club, was a member of the Royal Yacht Squadron and served in both the Royal Navy Reserve and British Army during World War I.

== Early life ==
Fulcher was born at Pau in south-west France in 1855, the second son of Edward and Caroline Fulcher (née Green). His father was a captain in the 87th Royal Irish Fusiliers and Fulcher and educated at Westminster School between 1868 and 1872. He played cricket at school and was considered a good club cricketer.

== Cricket ==
A successful batsman for clubs such as Sevenoaks Vine, The Mote, Tunbridge Well, I Zingari, and Band of Brothers, Fulcher made seven first-class appearances for Kent between 1878 and 1887. He had played for Marylebone Cricket Club (MCC) from 1876, and made his first-class debut for the county against Nottinghamshire at Town Malling in June 1878. He made two further top-level appearances during the season, both against Hampshire, scoring 44 not out at Tunbridge Wells, an innings that remained his highest first-class score throughout his career.

Fulcher did not play for Kent again until the mid-1880s. In good batting form at club level, he made a number of high scores during the 1880s, including 224 for The Mote against the Royal West Kent Regiment in 1886. He played once for the county against Derbyshire at The Note later in the season, before making his final three first-class appearances during 1887. He scored a total of 156 first-class runs and continued to play for The Mote into the 1890s.

== Yachting career ==
Fulcher was an "enthusiastic" sailor, acquiring his first yacht, the 62-ton schooner Eurelia, in 1886. He bought the schooners Roseneath and Algeria, and the 27-ton yawl Grade before building a new Roseneath in 1898. He competed for the Queens Cup in the yacht, a 54-ton schooner, at Cowes Week in 1899 and in both 1899 and 1900 the yacht won the Emperor's Cup at the same regatta. With its joint owner Lord Normanton at the helm, it competed in the Dover–Heligoland Race in 1899.

During 1903, Fulcher raced the Villaya, a yacht he was the joint owner of, in the Solent one-design class. In 1905 he sold the Roseneath, purchasing a yawl, Xenia, which he converted into a ketch and rechristened Kestrel. A member of the Royal Yacht Squadron, Fulcher was also a member of the Royal Dorset, Royal Cinque Ports, and Castle clubs.

== Military career ==
The son of a career soldier, Fulcher was commissioned as a lieutenant in the West Kent Yeomanry, a militia cavalry unit, in 1883. He served in the West Kent's until transferring to the Suffolk Yeomanry in 1890. He was promoted to captain and in 1897 to the rank of major, before retiring from the militia the same year.

Soon after the start of World War I, Fulcher joined the Royal Navy Reserve and was commissioned with the rank of lieutenant commander. He commanded the 330-ton steam yacht Hersilia which had been launched in 1895 and requisitioned and armed at the start of the war. The vessel patrolled the waters of the Hebrides as part of the naval blockade of Germany. (Note: Hersilia was wrecked in the Hebrides in 1916.)

Fulcher resigned his naval commission in early 1915 and took up the post of Assistant Provost Marshal of the South Irish Command, based at Queenstown in County Cork. He served until the end of 1915 when, at the age of 60, he retired from the army.

== Personal life ==
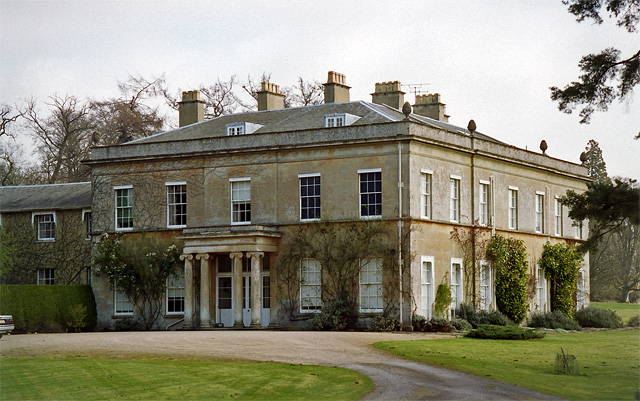
Redenham House where Fulcher lived in Hampshire.

Professionally Fulcher worked as a wine merchant and was on the board of a brewery, although for much of his life he was considered wealthy enough to not need to work. As well as cricket and yachting, he was thought of as a good shot and rode in fox hunts. He married Gertrude Cooper in 1882; the couple had three sons.

Their eldest son Edward played for Devonshire County Cricket Club between 1904 and 1930 and made two appearances for the Kent Second XI in 1909. Their younger son, Eric played for Norfolk between 1910 and 1922 and made four first-class appearances for Kent in 1919. Both sons served in the army during World War I, Eric winning the Military Cross.

Fulcher lived at Bearsted in Kent, at Billericay in Essex, and at Redenham House near Andover in Hampshire. He was a Justice of the Peace for Kent between 1899 and 1911, for Hampshire between 1911 and 1914, and then again in Kent from 1918. He died from pneumonia at Bayswater in London in 1932 aged 77.

== Bibliography ==
- Carlaw, Derek (2020). Kent County Cricketers, A to Z: Part One (1806–1914) (PDF). Cardiff: ACS.
- Lewis, Paul (2014). For Kent and Country. Eastbourne: Reveille Press. ISBN 978-19-08336-63-7.
