= William A. Finley =

American college president

W.A. Finley was the first president of Corvallis College, forerunner of today's Oregon State University.

William Asa Finley (1839 – June 18, 1912) was an American academic and the first president of Corvallis College, known today as Oregon State University.

== Biography ==
=== Early years ===
Born in Missouri in 1839, Finley moved to California in 1852. He went to California Wesleyan College in Santa Clara for three years and Pacific Methodist College for one year, where he received the degree of Artium Magister.

Thereafter, he received the honorary Doctor of Divinity from Wofford College in Spartanburg, South Carolina in 1871.

William Asa Finley was the grandson of both Missouri state legislator Asa Finley and of California Pioneer William M. Campbell I, whose son co-founded the city of Campbell, California.

=== College administrator ===
In 1865, Finley became the first president of Corvallis College by the appointment of the Methodist Episcopal Church, South. His son Ernest L. Finley, the future founder of The Press Democrat, was born in 1870. His presidency there lasted until he resigned in June 1872 because of the health problems of his wife, Sarah Elizabeth Latimer. After Finley moved back to Santa Rosa, California with his wife, he became the second president of Pacific Methodist College in 1876; later, he became a president of Santa Rosa Young Ladies College.

=== Death and legacy ===
Finley died June 18, 1912, in Santa Rosa, California, of "general debility." He was 78 years old at the time of his death.

Finley's contribution to Oregon State University was significant in that during his presidency, Corvallis College became Oregon's first and only independent institution of higher education in 1868.

William L. Finley National Wildlife Refuge was named for Finley's nephew, conservationist William L. Finley.

Finley Hall on the Oregon State University campus was named for him.
