= Timothy Fish =

American novelist

Timothy Fish is a multi-genre author. He has written both fiction and non-fiction titles. His fiction titles are characterized by his unusual way of looking at the world in general. He is distinctive from other christian fiction authors in his apparent disdain for religion.

He lives in Texas and is a native of Zalma, Missouri.

== List of works by Timothy Fish ==
1. Church Website Design: A step by step approach (ISBN 1-4196-5971-5) - Church Website Design takes the reader through the step by step process of developing a church website. It begins by explaining the process of determining the needs the church has for a website. It then shows the reader how to start with a rough idea of what the website should look like and convert that into an attractive church website. The book also deals with coding and maintaining the website.
2. Searching for Mom (2007) (ISBN 1-4196-7039-5) - This novel is about a tomboy named Sara who uses an online dating service, pretending to be her Dad, to find him a wife and her a mother. When Sara meets Ellen everything seems to be going well. Ellen is everything Sara could want in a mother and they become friends but trouble comes when Sara tries to bring Ellen and her Dad together.
3. The Story Teller (a short story)
4. How to Become a Bible Character (2007) (ISBN 978-1-4196-8331-2) - This novel is about a youth minister who must teach a teenager who has one unmet goal. He wants to become a Bible character. The youth minister must point him in the right direction when he attempts the impossible.
5. For the Love of a Devil (2008) (ISBN 978-1-4392-1425-1 ) - This novel is inspired by the biblical account of Hosea. In this modern retelling of that story, a beleaguered English teacher, Geoff Mywell, longs for the love he once thought his wife had for him, but when she leaves him for another man, he isn't sure whether to give in to the relief of having her out of the house or be sorry that the marriage seems broken beyond repair. He goes after her as she moves from one man to the next and then returns to prostitution. Geoff must enter the darkness and pull her back or lose the woman he loves forever.
6. And Thy House (2009) (ISBN 978-1-4392-6871-1) - This novel is about a man who comes to salvation late in life and struggles to handle the consequences of the mistakes he made before.
7. Mother Not Wanted (2010) (ISBN 978-1-6129-5000-6) - This novel is about a woman who has illegally raised a girl as her own, but decides to return the girl to her family.
8. Book Cover Design Wizardry: For the Self-Publishing Author (ISBN 978-1-6129-5001-3) - This book, through 250 full color graphics and text, shows self-publishing authors how they can create covers for their books.
