= Lucinda Finley =

American law professor

Lucinda Finley is the Frank G. Raichle Professor of Trial and Appellate Advocacy at the University at Buffalo.

== Biography ==
She has a 1980 J.D. from Columbia University School of Law, and a 1977 B.A. from Barnard College. Prior to joining the Buffalo law faculty, she was on the Yale Law School faculty, and she has also been a visiting professor at the University of Sydney Law School in Australia and an adjunct professor at Cornell Law School. In 1999, she was the distinguished visiting professor at DePaul University Law School in Chicago.

She was additionally appointed to the newly-created position of vice provost for faculty affairs in February 2005, a position she held until 2014..

At Buffalo, Professor Findley teaches courses in Civil Procedure, Mass Torts, Complex Litigation and Employment Discrimination.

== Books published ==
She is the author of two books:

- Tort Law and Practice (with D. Vetri, L. Levine, and J. Vogel) (LexisNexis/Matthew Bender, 3rd edition, 2006)
- Tort Law and Practice (with D. Vetri, L. Levine, and J. Vogel) (LexisNexis/Matthew Bender, 2nd edition, 2003)
