= Susy Frankel =

New Zealand law academic

Susy Rebecca Frankel FRSNZ
- Education: Queen Mary University of London
- Scientific career
- Fields: International Economic Law
- Workplaces: Victoria University of Wellington

Susy Rebecca Frankel FRSNZ is a New Zealand law academic, and as of 2019 is a full professor at the Victoria University of Wellington.

== Academic career ==
After an LL.B. at Victoria University of Wellington and an LLM at Queen Mary University of London, Frankel returned to Wellington, rising to full professor. She serves on the board of the Pacific Economic Cooperation Council. She was elected Fellow of the Royal Society Te Apārangi in 2018.

In 2020 she was appointed a member of the Waitangi Tribunal.

== Selected works ==
- Frankel, Susy. "WTO Application of the Customary Rules of Interpretation of Public International Law to Intellectual Property." Va. J. Int'l L. 46 (2005): 365.
- Frankel, Susy. "Challenging TRIPS-plus agreements: the potential utility of non-violation disputes." Journal of International Economic Law 12, no. 4 (2009): 1023–1065.
- Frankel, Susy, and Geoff McLay. Intellectual Property in New Zealand. LexisNexis Butterworths, 2002.
- Frankel, Susy, and Daniel Gervais. "Plain Packaging and the Interpretation of the TRIPS Agreement." Vand. J. Transnat'l L. 46 (2013): 1149.
