= Neville Frankel =

American writer (born 1948)

Neville D. Frankel
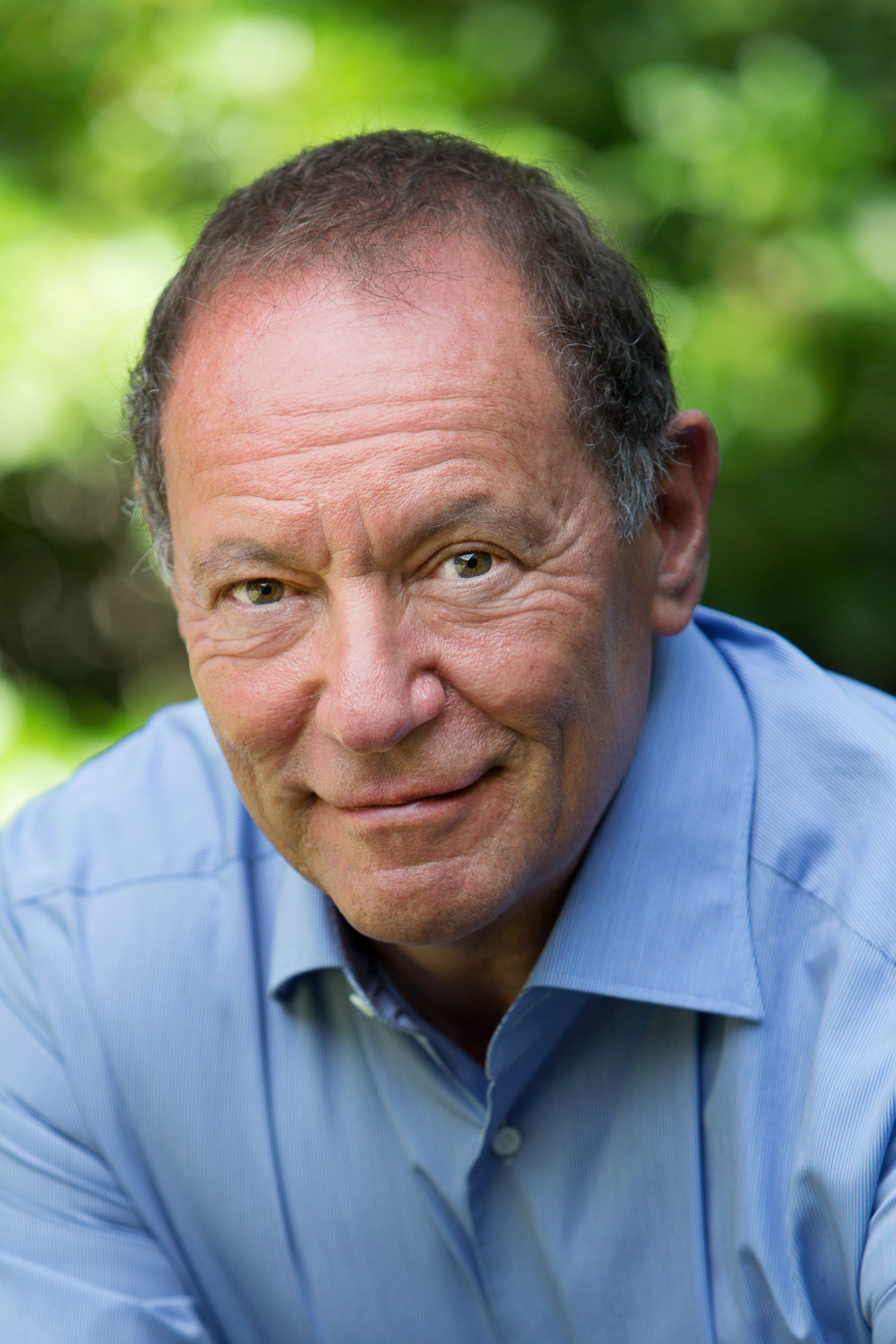
- Born: Neville David Frankel; 7 December 1948 (age 77); Johannesburg, South Africa
- Education: Dartmouth College (B.A.), University of Toledo (M.A.), University of Toronto (Ph.D., ABD)
- Occupation: Novelist
- Writing career
- Genres: Literary fiction, historical fiction
- Notable awards: Emmy (1984), National Jewish Book Award finalist (2017)
- Website: www.nevillefrankelauthor.com

Neville Frankel (born 7 December 1948) is a South Africa-born, American writer of literary and historical fiction. His novels include The Third Power (1980), Bloodlines (2012) and On the Sickle's Edge (2017). He received an Emmy for his work on a BBC documentary in 1984.

Frankel was also a financial planner for more than thirty years.

== Early life and education ==
Born in Johannesburg, South Africa, Frankel immigrated to the United States with his family in 1962 at the age of 14. He majored in English at Dartmouth College in Hanover, New Hampshire, where he graduated in 1972. He earned an MA in English literature from the University of Toledo in 1976. He subsequently pursued doctoral work in English literature at the University of Toronto.

== Literary career ==
Frankel’s first published book was The Third Power (1980), a political thriller about the transformation of Rhodesia to Zimbabwe.

He was the program consultant for the Emmy award-winning documentary, The Mind of a Murderer: Part 1, produced by the BBC/Frontline in 1984.

In 2005 Frankel resumed his writing career and published Bloodlines, a novel set in South Africa’s anti-apartheid era, in 2012.

In 2017 Frankel published On the Sickle's Edge, a novel set in the Soviet Union and Eastern Europe in the 20th century and inspired by the author's own family story. On the Sickle's Edge was selected as a 2017 National Jewish Book Award finalist in the Book Club Award category.

== Personal life ==
Frankel is married and has three grown children and five grandchildren. He is also an avid painter and mountain hiker.

== Bibliography ==
=== Novels ===
- The Third Power (1980) ISBN 978-1-4800-7470-5
- Bloodlines (2012) ISBN 0984963200
- On the Sickle's Edge (2017) ISBN 978-1-944884-10-9

=== Documentary film ===
- The Mind of a Murderer: Part 1, British Broadcasting Company/Frontline (1984)

=== Awards ===
- 1984: Emmy for BBC/Frontline documentary film
- 2017: National Jewish Book Award: Finalist in the Book Club Award category
