= Kathleen Lindsay =

English author

- Born: Kathleen Mary Lindsay; 1903; Aldershot, Hampshire, England
- Died: 1973 (aged 69–70); Somerset West, Cape Province, South Africa
- Education: Convent of Sacre Coeur, Kakkatini Convent, Cairo
- Occupation: Author
- Writing career
- Pen name: Pen names -: Mary Faulkner; Margaret Cameron; Mary Richmond; Moolly Waring; Betty Mavera; Elisabeth Fenton; Nigel McKenzie; Hugh Desmond
- Genre: Historical Romantic fiction

Kathleen Mary Lindsay (1903–1973), was an English writer of historical romance novels. For some years she held the record as the most prolific novelist in history. According to Guinness World Records (1986 edition, where they refer to her under pen name of "Mary Faulkner"), she wrote 904 books under eleven pen names. This record has since been surpassed.

== Life ==
Kathleen Mary Lindsay was born in Aldershot, Hampshire, England. She was married at least three times, one of her husbands being Percy Edward Jeffryes. She wrote under all three married names as well as eight other pen names, using names of both sexes. These included Mary Faulkner, Margaret Cameron, Mary Richmond, Molly Waring, Betty Manvers, Elizabeth Fenton, Nigel Mackenzie and Hugh Desmond.

She seems to have lived in Western Australia at one stage. In 1934 she moved to New Zealand. However she later lived in Somerset West, Cape Province, South Africa, where she died.

== Works ==
Her titles include There is No Yesterday and Wind of Desire.

In 1961, Lindsay was accused of plagiarism by the author Georgette Heyer, after a reader identified similarities between Lindsay's book Winsome Lass and Heyer's works. Heyer sent a summary of the similarities to Lindsay's publisher, Robert Lusty of Hurst & Blackett, prompting Lindsay to reply, "What does it all amount to? About four incidents and two lines." Lindsay's dismissive response inspired Heyer to provide a detailed eleven-page analysis of the alleged plagiarisms cross referenced against eight of her own novels to her solicitor, who recommended an injunction. The case never made it to court.

== Sources and external links ==
- FantasticFiction
- AustLit
- Classic Crime Fiction
- Crime Fiction IV: A Comprehensive Bibliography, 1749–2000
