= William L. Finley National Wildlife Refuge =

Protected area in Oregon, United States

- IUCN category IV (habitat/species management area)
- Location within Oregon
- Location: Benton County, Oregon, United States
- Nearest city: Corvallis, OR
- Coordinates: 44.4090110°N 123.3217657°W
- Area: 5,706 acres (2,309 ha)
- Established: 1964
- Named for: William L. Finley
- Governing body: United States Fish and Wildlife Service
- Website: William L. Finley NWR

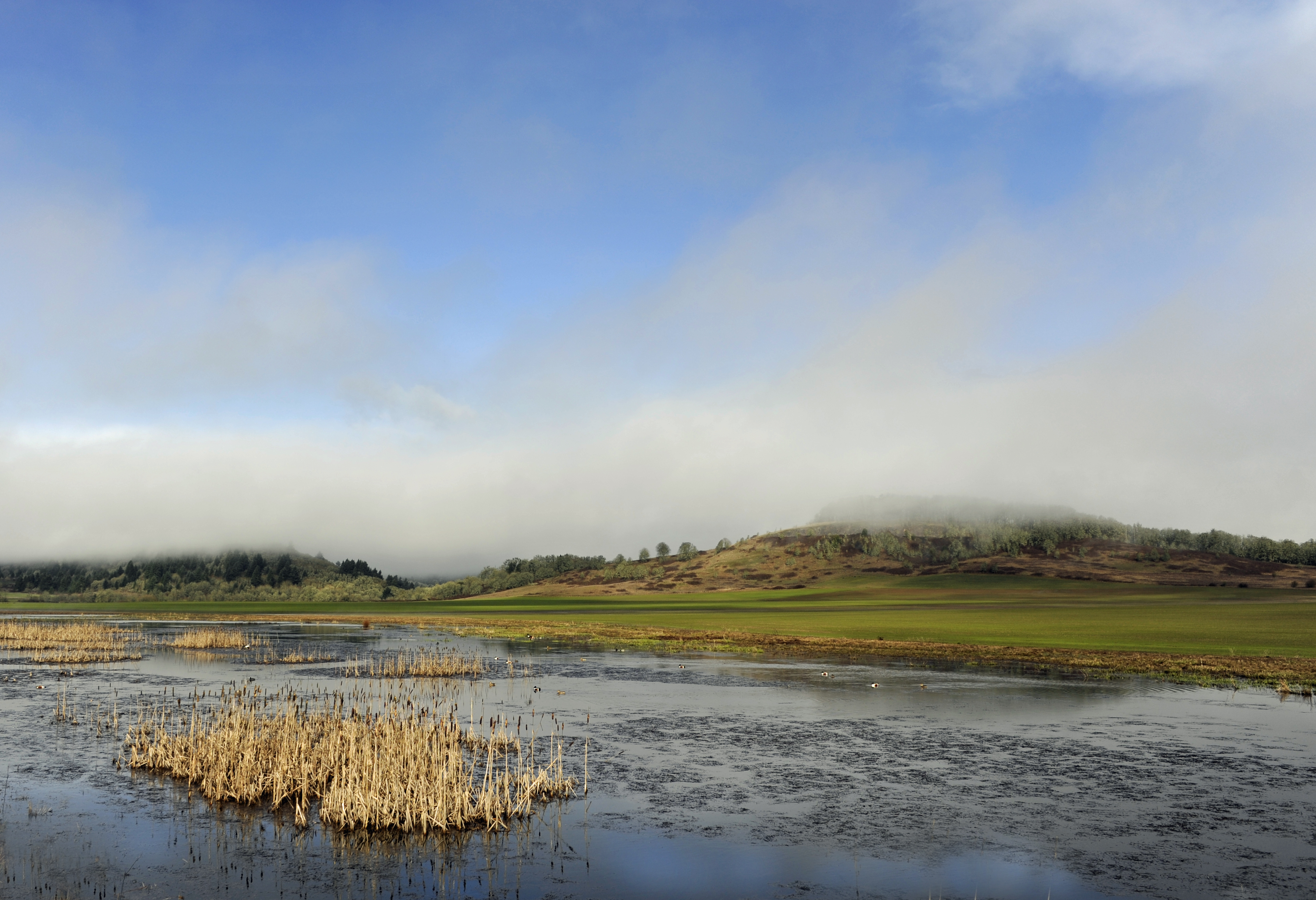
Wetlands at Pigeon Butte in morning light

William L. Finley National Wildlife Refuge is a natural area in the Willamette Valley in Oregon, United States. It was created to provide wintering habitat for dusky Canada geese. Unlike other Canada geese, dusky Canada geese have limited summer and winter ranges. They nest on Alaska's Copper River Delta and winter almost exclusively in the Willamette Valley. Habitat loss, predation, and hunting have caused a decrease in population.

Located ten miles south of Corvallis, Oregon, the refuge protects many of the historic habitats of the valley, including the largest remaining tract of native Willamette Valley wet prairie. Fields of wildlife food crops are interspersed with Oregon white oak savannah, meandering creeks with bottomland Oregon ash forest, old growth bigleaf maple, and native prairie.

Other management goals are to preserve native species and enhance biodiversity including the rare oak savannah, upland prairie, and wet prairie habitats. Endangered and threatened species such as Oregon chub, and Bradshaw's desert parsley find protection and sanctuary on the refuge. A herd of Roosevelt elk can be found in the bottomland forests or farm fields on the refuge.

Under cooperative agreements, area farmers plant refuge fields to produce nutritious grasses preferred by geese. The geese also need water for resting and foraging habitat. Many refuge wetlands occur naturally; others are created by dikes and levees. Some refuge wetlands, drained or channelized by previous owners, are being restored in low-lying areas of the refuge to increase diversity and desirability of habitat for wildlife.

The majority of wetlands are being managed as moist soil units, to promote growth of wetland food plants (millet, smartweed, sedges, etc.) used as food by waterfowl and other wildlife. By resting in undisturbed areas on the refuges, wintering geese regain energy reserves required for migration and nesting. This sanctuary reduces depredation problems on neighboring private lands.

Of historic interest is the Fiechter House, completed in 1857, and thought to be the oldest house in Benton County. The refuge was named for William L. Finley, an early conservationist who persuaded President Theodore Roosevelt to set aside the first National Wildlife Refuge west of the Mississippi River.

Two county roads passing through the refuge are open to the public throughout the year. Similar access is also provided at four viewpoints (kiosks and bulletin boards) and two trails (Woodpecker Loop and Mill Hill). To provide a quiet resting area, waterfowl habitat is closed to public entry while the geese are in residence, from November 1 through March 31. This winter waterfowl closure includes all portions of the refuge except the two trails, kiosks, bulletin boards, and headquarters building.

== See also ==
- List of National Wildlife Refuges
- John Fiechter House
- Willamette Valley National Wildlife Refuge Complex
