= Ben Finley (journalist) =

Broadcast journalist

Ben Finley is a broadcast journalist who is the editorial producer with Anderson Cooper 360 on CNN. He was a producer for In the Life on PBS and has produced for several MSNBC and CNN programs and specials, including presidential debates, the wedding of William & Kate, Hurricane Sandy, PoliticsNation with Al Sharpton, Hope Survives: 30 Years of AIDS and Bullying: It Stops Here. Shows he has worked on have earned an Emmy Award and three Peabody Awards. He is a graduate of New York Institute of Technology.
