= George Williams Fulcher =

George Williams Fulcher (1795–1855) was an English poet and miscellaneous writer. He was also a practical botanist.

== Annual ==
Fulcher, born in 1795, carried on the business of a bookseller, stationer, and printer at Sudbury in Suffolk, where in 1825 he issued the first number of the Sudbury Pocket Book, an annual which he continued to publish during his life, and to which Bernard Barton, William and Mary Howitt, James Montgomery and other lesser known writers contributed. A selection from these contributions appeared under the title of Fulcher's Poetical Miscellany in 1841.

== Publications ==
In 1838, Fulcher started a monthly miscellany of prose and verse entitled Fulcher's Sudbury Journal; this was not continued beyond the year. He made an effort to treat pauperism poetically, publishing The Village Paupers, and Other Poems. "The Village Paupers", in heroic couplets, shows the influence of George Crabbe and of Oliver Goldsmith's The Deserted Village. Of his miscellaneous poems, "The Dying Child" is best appreciated.

Fulcher also published The Ladies' Memorandum Book and Poetical Miscellany (1852 ff.) and The Farmer's Day-book, which reached a sixth edition in 1854.

On his death on 19 June 1855, he was writing a biography of Thomas Gainsborough, who was also from Sudbury. This work, embodying much original research and written in a terse, scholarly style, was completed by his son, E. S. Fulcher, and published in London in 1856. A second edition appeared the same year.

== Interests ==
Fulcher was a diligent student throughout his life, particularly in relation to Crabbe and Cowper. James Boswell's Life of Samuel Johnson (1791) was another of his favourite books. He was a practical botanist. He also took an active interest in local affairs, as one of the magistrates of the borough of Sudbury, president of its board of guardians and several times mayor. He gave much to charities.

George William Fulcher was buried in the churchyard of St Gregory's Church, Sudbury. Townspeople closed their shops, and the mayor, corporation, and magistrates of the borough followed the bier.
