= Mitch Finley =

American author

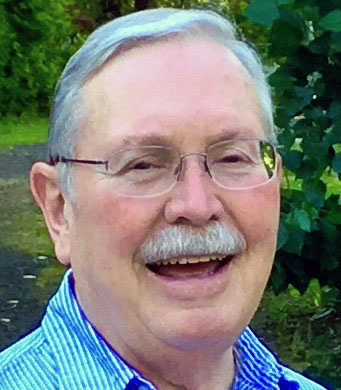
Mitch Finley

Mitch Finley (born December 17, 1945) is an American author who writes on religious and Catholic subjects.

Finley has written over 30 books and has won 11 Catholic Press Awards, along with an Excellence in Writing Award from the American Society of Journalists and Authors.

== Biography ==
Finley was born in 1945 in La Grande, Oregon. In 1964, he graduated from DeSales Catholic High School in Walla Walla, Washington. After graduation, Finley enlisted in the U.S. Navy. He received an honorable discharge in 1968 as a petty officer second class. Finley says that he "put in four years in the Navy without serving even one day aboard ship; it was all shore duty."

After the Navy, Finley entered the Brothers of Holy Cross three-month candidacy program, then located at Saint. Francis High School in Mountain View, California, During this time, Finley also attended Santa Clara University as an English major. In January 1969, Flnley completed the Holy Cross Brothers' one-year novitiate in Valatie, New York. The community then sent him to St. Edward's University in Austin, Texas, for one semester.

Finley returned to the Brothers' community at St. Francis High School, where he re-enrolled at Santa Clara as a religious studies major. In November 1972, he left the Holy Cross Brothers. In May 1973, Finley graduated from Santa Clara, earning a Bachelor of Arts in Religious Studies.

On March 9, 1974. Finley and Kathleen Hickey were married. The wedding took place in the student chapel of Gonzaga University, in Spokane, Washington, Kathleen Hickey's alma mater. In 1976, he earned a Master of Arts in Theology from Marquette University in Milwaukee, Wisconsin. The couple has three adult sons.

== Books ==
- The Seeker's Guide to Being Catholic
- The Ten Commandments: Timeless Challenges for Today
- The Seven Gifts of the Holy Spirit
- The Joy of Being Catholic
- A Man's Guide to Being Catholic
- The Seeker's Guide to Saints
- Season of Promises
- Christian Families In the Real World: Reflections On a Spirituality for the Domestic Church, written with Kathy Finley
- Your One-Stop Guide to Mary
- Prayer for People Who Think Too Much: A Guide to Everyday, Anywhere Prayer from the World's Faith Traditions
- Saint Anthony and Saint Jude: True Stories of Heavenly Help
- The Joy of Being a Eucharistic Minister
- The Catholic Virtues: Seven Pillars of a Good Life
- The Corporal & Spiritual Works of Mercy: Living Christian Love and Compassion
- It's Not the Same Without You: Coming Home to the Catholic Church
- Everybody Has a Guardian Angel
- The Joy of Being a Lector
- Catholic is Wonderful!
- Surprising Mary
- You Are My Beloved: Meditations on God's Steadfast Love
- Your Family in Focus: Appreciating What You Have, Making It Even Better
- What Faith is Not
- Season of New Beginnings
- Let's Begin with Prayer: 130 Prayers for Middle and High Schools
- The Saints Speak to You Today: 365 Daily Reminders
- The Gospel Truth
- Catholic Spiritual Classics
- Whispers of God's Love: Touching the Lives of Loved Ones After Death
- 101 Ways to Happiness: Nourishing Body, Mind, and Soul
- Key Moments in Church History
- The Rosary Handbook: A Guide for Newcomers, Old-Timers, and Those In Between
- The Patron Saints Handbook
