= William L. Finley =

American wildlife photographer and conservationist

William Lovell Finley
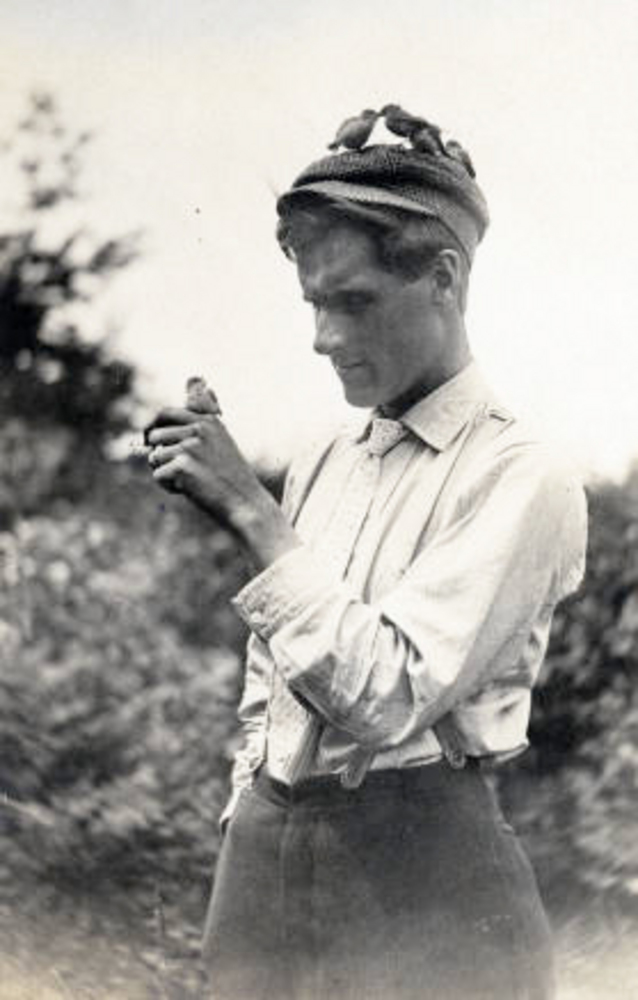
- Finley c. 1908
- Born: August 9, 1876; Santa Clara, California
- Died: June 29, 1953 (aged 76); Portland, Oregon

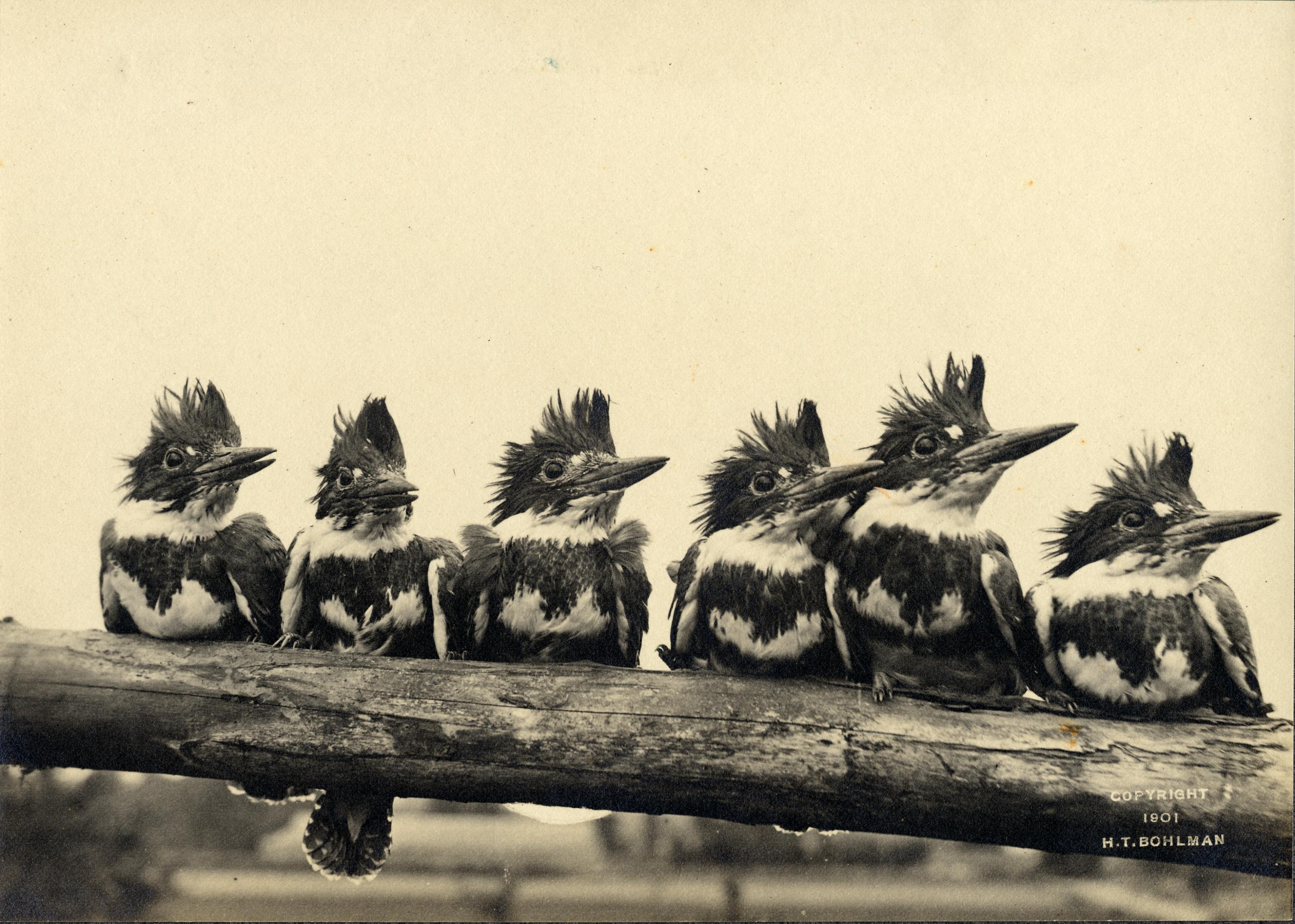
"Six of the frowzy-headed Fishers in a pose", from Finley's American Birds, 1908.

William Lovell Finley (August 9, 1876 – June 29, 1953) was an American wildlife photographer and conservationist from Northern California. The William L. Finley National Wildlife Refuge was named in his honor.

== Family ==
He was born on August 9, 1876, in Santa Clara, California, to John Pettus Finley and Nancy Catherine Rucker. Finley's parents had migrated west by covered wagon in 1852 from Saline County, Missouri, to Santa Clara, California, when they were just small children. Finley's middle name, Lovell, was the name of another of the families that went west with the Finleys and Ruckers. Finley's great-grandfather was Asa Finley, the first elected judge of Arrow Rock in Saline County, and his uncle was William Asa Finley, the first president of Oregon State University (then named Corvallis College).

Finley married, and he and his wife Irene traveled together on expeditions in the Bering Sea, the Gulf of Mexico, and mountainous parts of North America. They had two children – a son and a daughter.

== Career ==
In 1905, Finley and Herman T. Bohlman visited and photographed Lower Klamath Lake and Tule Lake. Their report in the November–December issue of Bird Lore helped prompt President Theodore Roosevelt to set the areas aside as federal bird reservations. The same year, Finley was elected to the board of the National Association of Audubon Societies for the Protection of Wild Birds and Animals (which later became the National Audubon Society), to fill the term vacated by Isaac N. Field.

In 1906, Finley was elected the second president of the Oregon Audubon Society (which became the Audubon Society of Portland in 1968).

In 1907, Finley published American Birds, which he and Herman T. Bohlman illustrated. In 1910, he was appointed to study fish and game commissions in other states, and in 1911, based on his information, one was set up in Oregon.

In 1925, Finley was appointed by the Oregon Governor Walter M. Pierce to the State Game Commission.

He died on June 29, 1953, in Portland, Oregon.
