= Wanda Live! at Third Man Records =

Live album by Wanda Jackson
- Released: 2011
- Label: Third Man
- Producer: Jack White

Wanda Jackson chronology
The Party Ain't Over (2011)	Wanda Live! at Third Man Records (2011)	Unfinished Business (2012)

Wanda Live! at Third Man Records is a live album by American singer Wanda Jackson.

The album features some of Jackson's own music as well as covers of songs originally by artists like Amy Winehouse.

== Track listing ==
1. "Raunchy" (instrumental)
2. "Riot in Cell Block Number 9"
3. "I'm Busted"
4. "You Know I'm No Good"
5. "Like a Baby"
6. "Right or Wrong"
7. "Fujiyama Mama"
8. "Funnel of Love"
9. "Blue Yodel #6"
10. "Let's Have a Party"
11. "Shakin' All Over"

== Personnel ==
- Wanda Jackson - vocals
- Jack White - lead guitar
- Olivia Jean - rhythm guitar
- Rich Gilbert - pedal steel guitar
- Dominic Davis - bass
- Joe Gillis - keyboards
- Joey Waronker - drums
- Craig Swift - saxophone
- Leif Shires - trumpet
- Justin Carpenter - trombone
- Ashley Monroe, Ruby Amanfu - backing vocals
