= The Alligators =

Danish rockabilly band (1990–??)

- Origin: Denmark
- Genres: Rock 'n' roll, rockabilly
- Years active: 1990–??
- Label: Rekord Records
- Members: Morten Kjeldsen; Ole Ballund; Jens Dan; Niels Mathiasen
- Website: thealligators.dk (defunct)

The Alligators are a Danish rock'n'roll and rockabilly band. Three members of The Aligators form The Pek'a'billies, the supporting band for performer Mek Pek on albums and songs credited to Mek & The Pek'a'billies.

== History ==
The Alligators were founded in the later summer of 1990 in Copenhagen by drummer Ole Ballund, bassist Jens Dan and guitarist Morten Kjeldsen ("rockM"), all seasoned musicians with a common passion for the 1950s rock'n'roll and rockabilly. Saxophonist Niels Mathiasen initially joined the group in 1994; however, he did not become a full-time member of the group until 1997.

During their first six months, The Alligators became familiar in the Copenhagen area as performers on the street and in undistinguished bars. Then, in the spring of 1991, a demonstration recording of theirs reached the mainland, with the outcome that they signed an exclusive booking and management contract with the well established CBA agency. From that point, the band grew increasingly successful, and by the end of 1991 The Alligators were considered one of the hardest working rock'n'roll bands in Denmark.

In 1992 they played more than 200 shows, recorded their debut album Rock'n'roll ball, played engagements as the back-up band for The Jordanaires, and toured in the Greek islands. Also in that year, the band formed a productive association with singer and entertainer Mek Pek, following a performance in late February that developed into an all night jam session. By late 1992, they had together formed the band Mek & The Pekabillies.

Much studio work occupied the band in 1993: the recording of Mek & The Pek'a'billies, and of children's songs for the Aah Abe project. Also that year, they made several television appearances, played many concerts, and in November journeyed to the United States, for inspiration. In early 1994, Mek & The Pekabillies, on behalf of all artists involved, accepted the Danish Grammy Award for best album in the category "Songs for children", for the "Aah Abe" project, which to date has sold more than 400,000 copies in Denmark, whose population is 5.5 million.

In the summer of 1994 The Alligators were introduced to American singer Wanda Jackson. During the recording of her album Let's Have a Party, Jackson was so impressed with the band that she demanded that, when recording and touring Scandinavia, it must be with The Alligators. This resulted in two albums and one annual tour. About the same time, The Alligators met Danish-based, Scottish piano player and singer Stan Urban, which led to several live performances and some recording sessions.

The spring of 1995 brought more live work, and that summer The Alligators went into the Country Sound Studio to start recording their album The History of Rock'n'Roll, which included guest performances by a host of rockabilly veterans including Scotty Moore, Wanda Jackson and The Jordanaires.

The recording of The Queen of Rockabilly, the band's second album with Jackson, took place at the Pek Farm Studio, Ormslev, Denmark, in the early summer of 1996, followed by a minor tour in Denmark.

The band spent most of 1997 touring, including a Wanda Jackson tour of Germany. They also established their own studio and record label that year.

By January 1998 The Alligators ended their contract with CBA agency, and started pre-production work on a new album, this time concentrating on original material. During the same period they increasingly often performed as a quartet, the original trio being augmented with Scandinavia's leading tenor saxophone player, Niels Mathiasen, an old friend from the Pekabilly days.

By 1999, The Alligators were independent artists and very well known in the circles of Scandinavian music. Their first major undertaking of that year was an unprecedented tour of Greenland. This two-week tour of Greenland's west coast was something of a cultural shock, leaving a lasting impression on everybody involved. Transport was by large and small airplanes, helicopters and even dog sled. Summer is the season when motorcycle and hot rod enthusiasts assemble, camp, and party, and The Alligators are often the entertainment at these affairs, ensuring a couple of busy and enjoyable months for them, throughout the nation. In October, they went into the studio to begin recording a new album of original material. After recording some songs, they broke to do more writing, performing and planning. The millennium ended with The Alligators returning to Greenland for a new year's evening concert and celebration at Kangerlussuaq, the former American air base.

As of 2007, The Alligators were still touring.

== Discography ==
=== Albums ===
- Rock'n'Roll Ball (1992)
- Mek & The Pekabillies (1993)
- Randers Rock'n'Roll (1993)
- Åh Abe - Various artists, children's compilation album, including two songs by Mek & The Pekabillies (1993)
- Pa-Papagøje - Various artists, children's compilation album, including one song by Mek & The Pekabillies (1994)
- Let's Have a Party - Wanda Jackson, with The Alligators (1995)
- The History of Rock'n'Roll (with Scotty Moore, The Jordanaires, Wanda Jackson, Stan Urban, Mek Pek, Eddie Ryan) (1996)
- The Queen of Rock'a'Billy - Wanda Jackson (Dan, Ballund, Kjeldsen and Mathiasen are each credited - but not collectively as The Alligators) (1996)

=== Movies ===
- Vildbassen (1994)
