= Back Then (Wanda Jackson song) =

Single by Wanda Jackson

from the album I Wouldn't Want You Any Other Way
- B-side: "I'm Gonna Walk Out of Your Life"
- Released: July 1971
- Recorded: May 1971
- Studio: Jack Clement Studio
- Genre: Country
- Length: 3:15
- Label: Capitol
- Songwriter: Jerry Crutchfield
- Producer: Larry Butler

Wanda Jackson singles chronology
"People Gotta Be Loving" (1971)	"Back Then" (1971)	"I Already Know (What I'm Getting for My Birthday)" (1971)

"Back Then" is a song written by Jerry Crutchfield that was originally recorded by American singer, Wanda Jackson. The country recording was released as a single by Capitol Records in July 1971 and was her seventeenth single to make the US country top-40. It was later included on her 1972 album, I Wouldn't Want You Any Other Way.

== Background, recording and content ==
Wanda Jackson was best-known for her rock and roll recordings during the 1950s that made her among the first women to record this material. She moved into the country genre during the 1960s and had top-20 and top-40 singles during the decade. In 1971, Jackson became a Christian, which had a profound impact on her personal and professional life. She began recording more gospel material including 1971's Praise the Lord but was told by her label (Capitol Records) that she needed to continue recording country as well. Among her country recordings from this period was "Back Then". The song was penned by Jerry Crutchfield and produced by Larry Butler in May 1971 at the Jack Clement Studio in Nashville, Tennessee. According to Cash Box, the song's main character is reminiscing of how much better her relationship was when it was new.

== Release, critical reception and chart performance ==
"Back Then" was released as a single by Capitol Records in July 1971 and was distributed as a seven-inch vinyl disc. It was backed on the B-side by the track "I'm Gonna Walk Out of Your Life". It was reviewed by Billboard who called it a "compelling ballad" and believed it would be "the biggest seller of all-time" in her career. Similarly, Cash Box predicted it would become "the biggest of her career thus far". Despite these predictions, "Back Then" only made the US country top-30. It debuted on the Billboard Hot Country Songs chart on August 7, 1971 and spent 12 weeks there, only rising to number 25 by October 2. It was Jackson's seventeenth top-40 country single and among her final to make the top-40. It was later included on her 1972 album I Wouldn't Want You Any Other Way.

== Track listings ==
7" vinyl single

- "Back Then" – 3:15
- "I'm Gonna Walk Out of Your Life" – 2:20

== Chart performance ==
Chart (1971)	Peak position
US Hot Country Songs (Billboard)	25
