= Both Sides of the Line =

Single by Wanda Jackson and Her Party Timers

from the album You'll Always Have My Love
- B-side: "Famous Last Words"
- Released: March 1967
- Recorded: April 1966
- Studio: Columbia Studios
- Genre: Country
- Length: 2:15
- Label: Capitol
- Songwriter: Marian Francis
- Producer: Ken Nelson

Wanda Jackson and Her Party Timers singles chronology
"Tears Will Be the Chaser for Your Wine" (1966)	"Both Sides of the Line" (1967)	"My Heart Gets All the Breaks" (1967)

"Both Sides of the Line" is a song written by Marian Francis that was first recorded by American singer, Wanda Jackson and her band the Party Timers. It was released as a single by Capitol Records in March 1967 and became a top-30 charting US country song that year. It received positive reviews from music publications after its release.

== Background, recording and content ==
Wanda Jackson began her career as a country singer in the mid-1950s before briefly shifting to rock and roll in the late 1950s. She had found success in both fields during this period, but made her primary focus within the country genre as the 1960s progressed. In 1966, she had two top-20 country songs: "The Box It Came In" and "Tears Will Be the Chaser for Your Wine". "Both Sides of the Line" immediately followed her latter single release and was composed by Marian Francis. It was recorded in April 1966 at Columbia Studios, located in Nashville, Tennessee. The session was produced by Ken Nelson. The lyrics of "Both Sides of the Line" describe a female partner's "straying man", according to Cash Box.

== Release, critical reception and chart performance ==
"Both Sides of the Line" was released as a single by Capitol Records in March 1967 and was issued as a seven-inch vinyl disc. It featured a B-side titled "Famous Last Words". Jackson's backing band called "Her Party Timers" are also credited on the single. Cash Box named it one of its "Bullseye" country picks, meaning it was one of their top choices for the week the magazine was issued. Billboard described it as "plaintive ballad sung to perfection" and predicted it would make the top-10 of the country list. Despite this prediction, it would only reach the top-30. "Both Sides of the Line" entered the US Billboard Hot Country Songs chart on April 22, 1967 and spent 12 weeks there, stalling at number 21 on June 16. It later appeared on Jackson's studio album You'll Always Have My Love.

== Track listings ==
7" vinyl single

- "Both Sides of the Line" – 2:15
- "Famous Last Words" – 2:19

== Chart performance ==
Chart (1967)	Peak position
US Hot Country Songs (Billboard)	21
