= Because It's You =

Single by Wanda Jackson

from the album Reckless Love Affair
- B-side: "Long as I Have You"
- Released: April 1966
- Recorded: September 1965
- Studio: Columbia Studios
- Genre: Country
- Length: 2:23
- Label: Capitol
- Songwriters: Bobby George; Vern Stovall
- Producer: Ken Nelson

Wanda Jackson singles chronology
"The Box It Came In" (1966)	"Because It's You" (1966)	"This Gun Don't Care" (1966)

"Because It's You" is a song originally recorded by American singer, Wanda Jackson. The country music ballad was written by Vern Stovall and Bobby George and released as a single in 1966. It later reached the US country top-40 that year and was included on the studio album Reckless Love Affair. It also received positive reviews from Billboard and Cash Box.

== Background, recording and content ==
Wanda Jackson found popularity originally in the country field and then briefly shifted to rock and roll in the late 1950s and early 1960s with songs like "Let's Have a Party". She eventually reverted to the country genre as the decade progressed, reaching the top-20 in 1966 with "The Box It Came In". "Because It's You" would serve as its follow-up release the same year. The tune was composed by Vern Stovall and Bobby George, while production was credited to Ken Nelson. It was recorded in September 1965 at Columbia Studios, located in Nashville, Tennessee. The lyrics of "Because It's You" center on a woman who chooses to stand by her male partner regardless of the places he chooses to venture to.

== Release, critical reception and chart performance ==
"Because It's You" was released as a single by Capitol Records in April 1966 and was distributed as a seven-inch disc. It included a B-side titled "Long as I Have You". It received a positive response from music publications. Cash Box classified it as a "Bullseye", which meant it was one of their top song picks for the week. "Wanda Jackson should score well among country fans with this top-notch vocal," they wrote. Billboard praised Jackson for giving "a warm, emotional reading" to the song and predicted it would place higher on their country chart than "The Box It Came In" did. However, "Because It's You" reached a lower position. Debuting on the US Billboard Hot Country Songs chart on June 25, 1966, it spent seven weeks there, peaking at the number 28 position on July 30, 1966. It was Jackson's eighth top-40 single on the Billboard country chart. It was released as part of Jackson's Capitol album Reckless Love Affair.

== Track listings ==
7" vinyl single

- "Because It's You" – 2:23
- "Long as I Have You" – 2:19

== Chart performance ==
Chart (1966)	Peak position
US Hot Country Songs (Billboard)	28
