= My Baby Walked Right Out on Me =

Single by Wanda Jackson and the Party Timers

from the album Cream of the Crop
- B-side: "My Days Are Darker Than Your Nights"
- Released: April 1968
- Recorded: June 1967
- Studio: Columbia Studios
- Genre: Country
- Length: 2:20
- Label: Capitol
- Songwriter: Curtiss Wayne
- Producer: Ken Nelson

Wanda Jackson and the Party Timers singles chronology
| "By the Time You Get to Phoenix" (1968) | "My Baby Walked Right Out on Me" (1968) | "Little Boy Soldier" (1968) |

"My Baby Walked Right Out on Me" is a song written by Curtiss Wayne that was originally recorded by American singer, Wanda Jackson and her band the Party Timers. The uptempo song was issued as a single that made the top-40 on the US country chart in 1968, becoming her eleventh single to do so.

== Background, recording and content ==
Wanda Jackson launched as a country singer at the Decca label when she switched to the rock and roll market during much of the 1950s. In the 1960s, she returned to the country field with top-10 singles like "In the Middle of a Heartache" and the top-20 "The Box It Came In". One of her 1960s top-40 country songs was "My Baby Walked Right Out on Me". It was composed by Curtiss Wayne and was produced by Ken Nelson at Columbia Studios (located in Nashville, Tennessee) in June 1967. The uptempo recording was described by Billboard as being about "lost love".

== Release, critical reception and chart performance ==
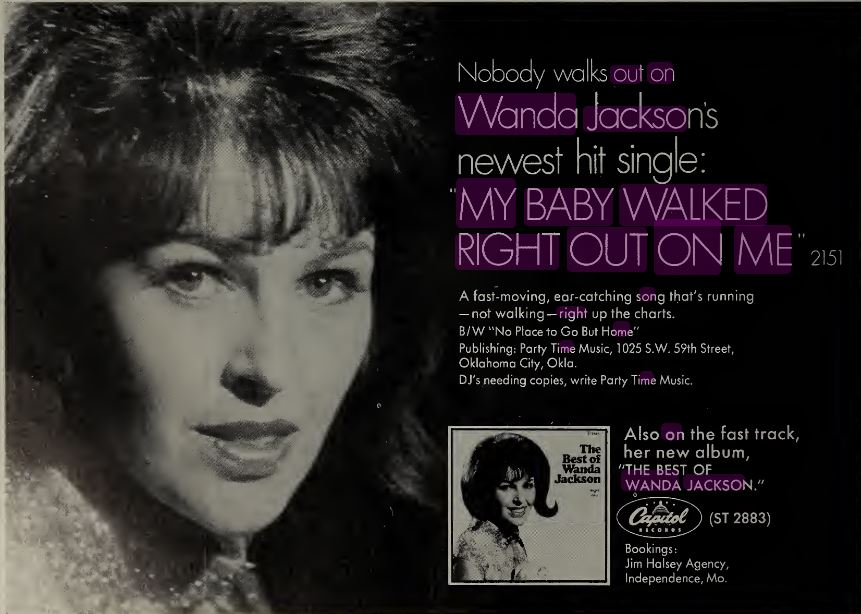
A trade ad for "My Baby Walked Right Out on Me", June 1968.

"My Baby Walked Right Out on Me" was released as a single by Capitol Records in April 1968 and distributed as a seven-inch vinyl disc. The release credited Jackson's backing band named the Party Timers and was titled on the disc as "Wanda Jackson and Her Party Timers". Billboard predicted its fast tempo arrangement would help it make the top-20 on their country chart. Cash Box described it as "a galloper" that they believed would make a top-50 chart placement. It debuted on the US Billboard Hot Country Songs list on May 4, 1968, and spent ten weeks there, reaching number 34 on June 8. It was Jackson's twelfth single to make the Billboard country top-40. It was later included on her 1968 album, Cream of the Crop.

== Track listings ==
7" vinyl single

- "My Baby Walked Right Out on Me" – 2:20
- "No Place to Go But Home" – 2:23

== Chart performance ==
| Chart (1968) | Peak position |
|---|---|
| US Hot Country Songs (Billboard) | 34 |
