= A Girl Don't Have to Drink to Have Fun =

Single by Wanda Jackson and the Party Timers

from the album Cream of the Crop
- B-side: "My Days Are Darker Than Your Nights"
- Released: October 1967
- Recorded: June 1967
- Studio: Columbia Studios
- Genre: Country
- Length: 2:38
- Label: Capitol
- Songwriters: Charlie Williams; Joe Nixon
- Producer: Ken Nelson

Wanda Jackson and the Party Timers singles chronology
| "My Heart Gets All the Breaks" (1967) | "A Girl Don't Have to Drink to Have Fun" (1967) | "By the Time You Get to Phoenix" (1968) |

"A Girl Don't Have to Drink to Have Fun" is a song originally recorded by American singer, Wanda Jackson. The country recording described a woman's beliefs about sobriety in social situations. It was released as a single by Capitol Records and reached the top-30 on the US country chart in early 1968.

== Background, recording and content ==
When Wanda Jackson began her career, she started in the country music genre before crossing into the Rockabilly field in the late 1950s. She then returned to country music in the 1960s and had several top-20 hits during the decade, including 1966's "The Box It Came In". Among the charting songs that followed the latter tune was "A Girl Don't Have to Drink to Have Fun". The track was co-written by Charlie Williams and Joe Nixon, and was produced by Ken Nelson at Columbia Studios (located in Nashville, Tennessee) in June 1967. "A Girl Don't Have to Drink to Have Fun" was an uptempo tune whose main character describes how she avoids drinking in social situations.

== Release and critical reception ==
"A Girl Don't Have to Drink to Have Fun" was released by Capitol Records in October 1967 as a seven-inch vinyl disc single and featured a B-side titled "My Days Are Darker Than Your Nights". The single release credited Jackson's backing band and was titled on the disc as "Wanda Jackson and the Party Timers". Cash Box believed it would "follow the hit sales" of her previous releases and would become a commercial success. Billboard called it "one of Miss Jackson's most commercial entries ever" and predicted it would make the top-10 of their country survey.

== Chart performance and impact ==
"A Girl Don't Have to Drink to Have Fun" debuted on the US Billboard Hot Country Songs chart on November 25, 1967 and spent 12 weeks there, reaching the number 22 position on January 13, 1968. It was Jackson's eleventh single to make the Billboard country top-40. It was later included on her 1968 album, Cream of the Crop. In the years following its original release, the tune continued to be reviewed. This included a review by Robert Christgau, who called the song "spunky" when reviewing a compilation by Jackson. Mary A. Bufwack and Bob Oermann found it to be among several examples of country songs from the era that criticized how men perceived women around bars and alcohol.

== Track listings ==
7" vinyl single

- "Both Sides of the Line" – 2:38
- "My Days Are Darker Than Your Nights" – 2:32

== Chart performance ==
| Chart (1967–1968) | Peak position |
|---|---|
| US Hot Country Songs (Billboard) | 22 |
