= Marty Roberts =

American radio disc jockey, songwriter, TV personality and actor (1918–2009)

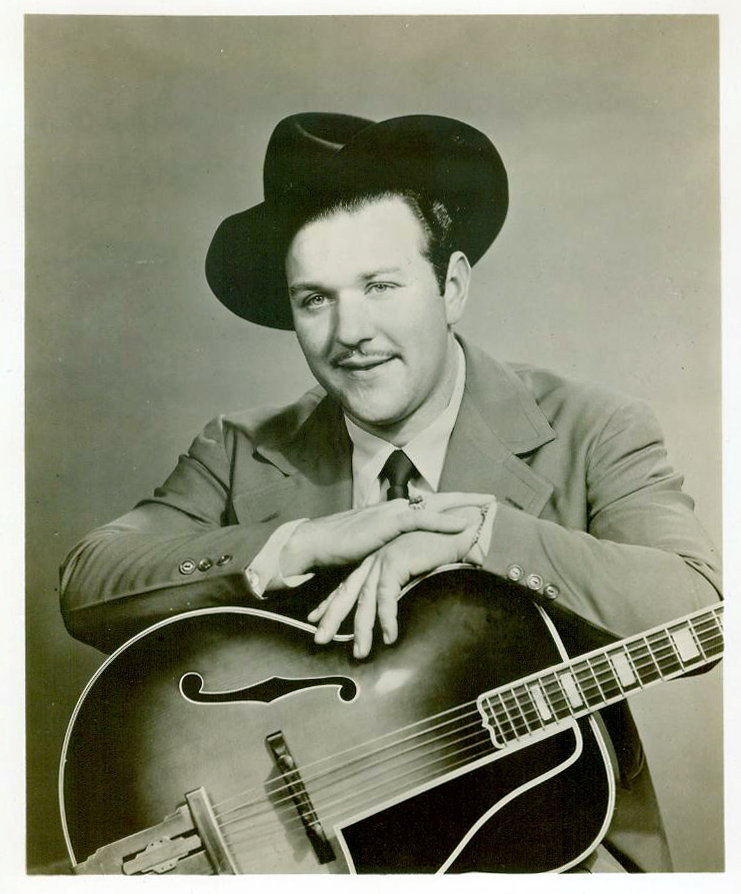
Marty Roberts with his favorite instrument, the L5 Gibson he purchased upon returning from WWII.

Marty Roberts (December 6, 1918 – November 20, 2009) was an American radio disc jockey (DJ), songwriter, TV personality and actor.

== Early life ==
Born Martin Robert Schopp in Chenoa, Illinois, he graduated from high school in 1935. Marty got an early start in the radio business when he appeared on WDZ in Decatur, Illinois as a sophomore in high school. Marty played the bass fiddle with The Lone Pine Fiddlers, a bluegrass group led by David "Stringbean" Akeman who later became notable as a longtime member of The Grand Ole Opry in Nashville, Tenn and a regular on the television show, "Hee Haw".

== Career ==
During his long career, Roberts played in several bands and appeared on many radio stations such as: WBT, Charlotte, N. C, 1938–41, with Tenn. Ramblers; WJJD, Chicago, 1941–2; WDZ, Tuscola, 1947–51; WCKY, Cincinnati, Ohio, 1951–8; WDZ, Decatur, 1958. In 1937, Marty was playing his bass with Ted DeLeon and his Mexican Caballeros, touring the country by private train. A year later, Roberts was playing with the Moon Mullins Dixeland Band in Greensboro, N.C. when he got his first break. While playing in a club in North Carolina, he became a member of the Tennessee Ramblers, which are based out of North Carolina.

The Ramblers appeared regularly on WBT in Charlotte playing their American Country and Western swing music. The band had a recording contract with Bluebird records and appeared in several Hollywood singing cowboy feature films, Ride Ranger, Ride (1936), Yodelin’ Kid from Pine Ridge (1937) and Ridin' the Cherokee Trail (1941).

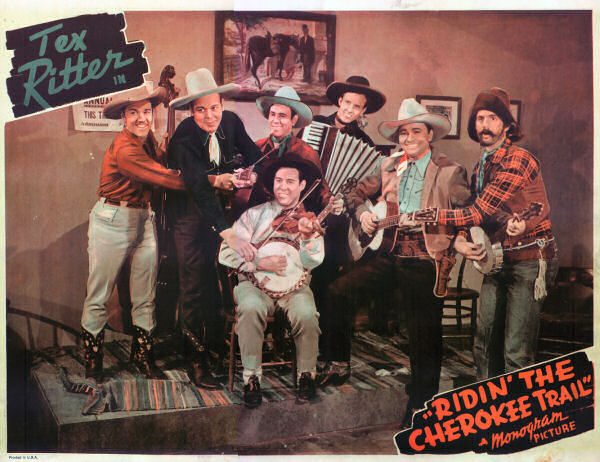
Marty Roberts and The Tennessee Ramblers on the movie set of Ridin' the Cherokee Trail starring Tex Ritter

Roberts' movie career was abruptly interrupted by the onset of WWII. Marty served in the Army as a Staff Sergeant during his deployment in Europe. Elements of the 63rd Infantry Division, including Schopp, landed in Marseilles, France, on December 8, 1944, and were rushed north to support Americans locked in the Battle of the Bulge. Shortly after VE-Day, Schopp played a part in providing entertainment for the men. Marty joined the troupe of 45 combat veterans of his 253rd Infantry Regiment turned in rifles for greasepaint to create G.I. Carmen.

Upon his return to the states after the war, Marty returned to his musical roots at WDZ in Illinois. He would later become a featured DJ on the station before moving to Cincinnati Ohio to join up with Nelson King on WCKY in 1951. He co-hosted the Hillbilly Jamboree with King and conducted the house band, “The Night Riders.”

Roberts authored and sang several country western tunes on Coral, Arc, and Flame record companies. Marty would achieve the honor of being in the Billboard magazines top 5 “Country and Western Disc Jockeys of the year” for 1951 through 1955.

Roberts also wrote several country and western tunes during his early years in the music business. Marty co-wrote a top ten hit for Wanda Jackson titled, “You Can't Have My Love” released for Decca Records May 1954.

Roberts finished his radio and entertainment career in Illinois on various radio stations as well as hosting “Marty's Dance Party” which was a live teen dance show produced by his wife Mary. The television show ran on WTVP in Decatur and WICS in Springfield Illinois during the 1960s. He continued to DJ on various radio stations in central Illinois for several years while taking his band on the road throughout the Midwest before retiring to a life of golf and relaxation in his home town of Chenoa Illinois.

Roberts died in November 2009 in St. Petersburg, Florida from complications related to a short illness. He is survived by his two sons, Allen Robert Schopp and Martin Brent Schopp.
