= You Can't Have My Love =

Single by Wanda Jackson with Billy Gray
- B-side: "Lovin' Country Style"
- Released: May 1954
- Recorded: March 24, 1954; Hollywood
- Genre: Country
- Label: Decca
- Songwriter(s): Billy Gray, Chuck Harding, Marty Roberts, Mark Thompson
- Producer(s): Tom Mack

Wanda Jackson singles chronology
| "You Can't Have My Love" (1954) | "The Right to Love" (1954) |

Billy Gray singles chronology
| "You Can't Have My Love" (1954) |

"You Can't Have My Love" is a song written by Billy Gray, Chuck Hardin, Marty Roberts, and Mark Thompson. It was recorded by American musician Wanda Jackson and American country musician Billy Gray.

The song was Jackson's first single released for Decca Records and it was released when she was only a teenager. Released as a single in May 1954, "You Can't Have My Love" became a national top-ten hit on the Billboard Magazine Most Played C&W in Juke Boxes chart, peaking at number eight. It would be the first of a string of charting country and pop hits for Jackson. In addition, it would be Gray's only charting single.

== Chart performance ==
| Chart (1954) | Peak position |
|---|---|
| U.S. Billboard Most Played C&W in Juke Boxes | 8 |
