= I Wouldn't Want You Any Other Way =

Studio album by Wanda Jackson
- Released: September 1972
- Recorded: January 1971 – December 1972
- Studio: Jack Clement Studio
- Genre: Country
- Label: Capitol
- Producers: Larry Butler; Bill Walker

Wanda Jackson chronology
Praise the Lord (1971)	I Wouldn't Want You Any Other Way (1972)	Country Gospel (1973)

Singles from I Wouldn't Want You Any Other Way
- 1. "Back Then" Released: July 1971; 2. "I Already Know (What I'm Getting for My Birthday)" Released: October 1971; 3. "I'll Be Whatever You Say" Released: February 1972; 4. "I Wouldn't Want You Any Other Way" Released: July 1972

I Wouldn't Want You Any Other Way is a studio album by American recording artist, Wanda Jackson. It was released in September 1972 by Capitol Records and contained ten tracks of country music. The album was Jackson's 19th release in her career. Four singles were spawned from the album including the title track. However, only "Back Then", "I Already Know (What I'm Getting for My Birthday)" and "I'll Be Whatever You Say" placed on the American country music chart. The album would later be re-released to digital markets.

== Background ==
Wanda Jackson had been recording for the Capitol label since the 1950s. She began as a Rockabilly artist and later transitioning into country music. In 1971, Jackson and her husband found Christ, which altered her musical direction in the years that followed. She released her first gospel record in 1972, and wished to continue recording gospel material. However, Capitol records rejected her request. Instead, Jackson was obligated to record another album of country songs. These songs would comprise I Wouldn't Want You Any Other Way.

== Content and recording ==
The project was recorded between January and December 1971 at the Jack Clement Studio in Nashville, Tennessee. The sessions were produced by Larry Butler and Bill Walker. I Wouldn't Want You Any Other Way consisted of 10 tracks featuring writing credits by Liz Anderson, Willie Nelson, and Tom T. Hall. According to the album's liner notes, the project was meant to showcase Jackson's vocal styles on "different kinds of country songs from ecology, to religion, to love." The album also included a cover of "Crazy", originally made commercially successful by Patsy Cline.

== Release and singles ==
I Wouldn't Want You Any Other Way was originally released in September 1972 by Capitol Records. The project marked Jackson's 19th studio album released in her career. It was originally issued as a vinyl LP containing 5 songs on either side of the record. The album was re-released via Capitol Records Nashville to digital and streaming markets including Apple Music. The LP's original release was noted in Billboard magazine and incorrectly spelled as I Wouldn't Have You Any Other Way.

The album included 4 single releases, beginning with "Back Then", which was issued in July 1971. Three months later, the song reached #25 on the Billboard Hot Country Singles chart. In October 1971, "I Already Know (What I'm Getting for My Birthday)" was released as the next single, In early 1972, the song reached #35 on the Billboard country singles chart. "I'll Be Whatever You Say" became the album's third single in February 1972. The track climbed to #57 on the country songs chart. The title track was issued as the project's final single in July 1972.

== Track listings ==
Side one
No.	Title	Writer(s)	Length
1.	"Song of the Wind"	Bob Millsap	2:36
2.	"Crazy"	Willie Nelson	2:33
3.	"One Hundred Children"	Tom T. Hall	2:56
4.	"I Wouldn't Want You Any Other Way"	Ray Griff	2:48
5.	"Happy Tracks"	Ray Pennington	2:30

Side two
No.	Title	Writer(s)	Length
1.	"I'll Be Whatever You Say"	Jamie Rogers	2:15
2.	"I Already Know (What I'm Getting for My Birthday)"	Liz Anderson	2:02
3.	"Missing You"	Larry Butler	2:20
4.	"Back Then"	Jerry Crutchfield	3:15
5.	"The More You See Me Less"	Curtiss Wayne	2:43

== Release history ==
Region	Date	Format	Label	Ref.
Canada; United States	September 1972	Vinyl	Capitol Records	
United States	2010s	Digital; Streaming	Capitol Records Nashville	
