= The Party Ain't Over =

Studio album by Wanda Jackson
- Released: January 25, 2011
- Recorded: 2009–2010
- Genres: Rockabilly, country, rock
- Length: 39:06
- Label: Third Man
- Producer: Jack White

Wanda Jackson chronology
I Remember Elvis (2006)	The Party Ain't Over (2011)	Wanda Live! at Third Man Records (2011)

Professional ratings
Review scores
Source	Rating
AllMusic	3/5 stars
Classic Rock	3/10 stars

The Party Ain't Over is the thirtieth studio album by American singer Wanda Jackson, produced by Jack White, the lead vocalist of The White Stripes. It peaked at number 17 on Top Rock Albums. The album also peaked at number 58 on the Billboard Hot 200 album chart, at the time making Jackson the oldest female vocalist to have ever charted on it. Billboard failed to place the album on its country LP chart, although Jackson covered several country songs on this disc.

The album featured covers of songs by artists including Amy Winehouse, Kitty Wells, Eddie Cochran, Johnny Cash, Johnny Kidd & The Pirates and Bob Dylan.

"Shakin' All Over" was featured on the Bridesmaids soundtrack and played during the end credits of the film.

== Track listing ==
No.	Title	Writer(s)	Length
1.	"Shakin' All Over"	Johnny Kidd, Guy Robinson	3:47
2.	"Rip It Up"	Robert Blackwell, John Marascalco	1:52
3.	"Busted"	Harlan Howard	2:48
4.	"Rum and Coca-Cola"	Lord Invader, Lionel Belasco	4:39
5.	"Thunder on the Mountain"	Bob Dylan	5:13
6.	"You Know I'm No Good"	Amy Winehouse	4:29
7.	"Like a Baby"	Jesse Stone	2:40
8.	"Nervous Breakdown"	Eddie Cochran	3:28
9.	"Dust on the Bible"	John Bailes, Walter Bailes	3:17
10.	"Teach Me Tonight"	Gene De Paul, Sammy Cahn	3:17
11.	"Blue Yodel #6"	Jimmie Rodgers	3:30

== Personnel ==
- Wanda Jackson – vocals, yodels
- Carl Broemel – pedal steel
- Justin Carpenter – trombone, piano
- Patrick Keeler – drums
- Joe Gillis – organ, piano, B3, keyboards
- Leif Shires – trumpet
- Craig Swift – saxophone
- Jack White – guitar, bass, tambourine
- Olivia Jean – guitar, percussion, bass
- Jack Lawrence – bass, fuzz bass, upright bass
- Dominic Davis – upright bass, mandolin
- Jackson Smith – guitar
- Ashley Monroe – background vocals
- Karen Elson – background vocals
