= A Woman Lives for Love =

Single by Wanda Jackson

from the album A Woman Lives for Love
- B-side: "What Have We Done"
- Released: March 1970
- Recorded: December 11, 1969
- Studio: Columbia (Nashville, Tennessee)
- Genre: Country
- Label: Capitol
- Songwriters: George Richey; Glenn Sutton; Norro Wilson
- Producer: George Richey

Wanda Jackson singles chronology
"Two Separate Bar Stools" (1969)	"A Woman Lives for Love" (1970)	"Who Shot John" (1970)

"A Woman Lives for Love" is a song written by George Richey, Glenn Sutton, and Norro Wilson. It was recorded and released as a single by American country, rock, and Christian artist, Wanda Jackson.

The song was recorded at the Columbia Recording Studios on December 11, 1969, in Nashville, Tennessee, United States. "A Woman Lives for Love" was officially released as a single in March 1970, peaking at number seventeen on the Billboard Magazine Hot Country Singles chart. The song was issued on Jackson's 1970 studio album of the same name.

The song earned Jackson a Grammy Award nomination for Best Female Country Vocal Performance in 1971. Jackson lost the award to Lynn Anderson for her monster hit ""Rose Garden." Ironically, "A Woman Lives for Love" may be best known by its cover version recorded by Anderson (who husband at the time was married to co-writer Sutton) which appeared on three albums in the early 1970s "Stay There Til I Get There", The World of Lynn Anderson, and the budget album also titled "A Woman Lives For Love".

== Chart performance ==
Chart (1970)	Peak position
U.S. Billboard Hot Country Singles	17
