= Reckless Love Affair =

Studio album by Wanda Jackson
- Released: March 1967
- Recorded: 1961 – 1966
- Studio: Columbia Studio
- Genre: Country
- Label: Capitol
- Producer: Ken Nelson

Wanda Jackson chronology
Wanda Jackson Salutes the Country Music Hall of Fame (1966)	Reckless Love Affair (1967)	You'll Always Have My Love (1967)

Singles from Reckless Love Affair
- 1. "Let Me Talk to You" Released: July 1963; 2. "The Box It Came In" Released: January 1966; 3. "Because It's You" Released: April 1966; 4. "This Gun Don't Care" Released: August 1966; 5. "Tears Will Be the Chaser for Your Wine" Released: November 1966

Reckless Love Affair is a studio album by American recording artist Wanda Jackson. It was released in March 1967 via Capitol Records and included 12 tracks. It was Jackson's tenth studio album release and was a collection of songs tailored towards the country music market. Reckless Love Affair included four singles that reached charting positions on the American country chart, including the top 20 hit "Tears Will Be the Chaser for Your Wine". The album itself reached charting positions in the United States and received a positive review following its initial release.

== Background and recording ==
Wanda Jackson released a series of Rockabilly recordings during the late 1950s, which included the top 40 hit "Let's Have a Party" and the international hit "Fujiyama Mama". In 1961, Jackson returned to her country music roots and had two top ten country hits with "Right or Wrong" and "In the Middle of a Heartache". She would continue to be identified with country music throughout the decade. Reckless Love Affair was among the albums Jackson recorded specifically for the country audience. The record was a concept studio album that included "Passionate words of heartbreak falling from tear-moistened lips", according to the liner notes. It was recorded in sessions held at the Columbia Studio in Nashville, Tennessee and was produced by Ken Nelson. The sessions were held between 1961 and 1966.

== Content ==
Reckless Love Affair was a collection of 12 newly recorded tracks. The album's fifth track, "What Have We Done", was composed by Jackson and her husband Wendell Goodman. The rest of the album had tracks composed by other writers and performers. The project featured several songs that told a story focused on the album's concept. The title track centered around a woman engaged in an affair. Meanwhile, "Tears Will Be the Chaser for Your Wine" and "This Gun Don't Care" offered advice to from a woman who finds her husband straying from their marriage. The liner notes describe "Long as I Have You" as a "melodious ballad celebrating the sunnier side of love".

== Release and chart performance ==
Reckless Love Affair was released in March on 1967 on Capitol Records. It was originally issued as a vinyl LP, containing six songs on either side of the record. The album was Jackson's tenth American studio release. In later decades it was re-released to digital and streaming markets, including Apple Music. Reckless Love Affair received a positive response from Billboard magazine following its original 1967 release. Writers called it "a winner all the way and will receive heavy radio exposure." The record also reached a charting position on the American country chart, peaking at number 17 on the Billboard Top Country Albums survey in June 1967. It was Jackson's third album to reach a Billboard chart position.

== Singles ==
Four singles were included on Reckless Love Affair. The first release was "Let Me Talk to You" in July 1963. It was followed by "The Box It Came In", which was issued as a single in January 1966. The song reached number 18 on the Billboard Hot Country Singles chart in March 1966, becoming Jackson's first top 20 hit single since 1962. It was followed in April 1966 by the single "Because It's You". The single reached number 28 on the Billboard country chart in July 1966. In August 1966, "This Gun Don't Care" was issued as the third single from the album. The song peaked at number 46 on the Billboard country list in October 1966. It was followed by "Tears Will Be the Chaser for Your Wine" in December 1966. The song climbed to number 11 on the Hot Country Singles chart by March 1967, becoming Jackson's highest chart hit since 1962.

== Track listings ==
Side one
No.	Title	Writer(s)	Length
1.	"Reckless Love Affair"	Rolley Baird	2:40
2.	"The Box It Came In"	Vic McAlpin	2:23
3.	"Look Out Heart"	L.D. Allen	2:15
4.	"Because It's You"	Bobby George; Vern Stovall	2:22
5.	"What Have We Done"	Wendell Goodman; Wanda Jackson	2:23
6.	"This Gun Don't Care"	Larry Lee	2:40

Side two
No.	Title	Writer(s)	Length
1.	"Tears Will Be the Chaser for Your Wine"	LeRoy Coates; Dale Davis	2:21
2.	"I Wonder If She Knows"	Yvonne Devaney	2:50
3.	"Long as I Have You"	Curtis Wayne	2:19
4.	"Let Me Talk to You"	Dan Dill; Don Davis	2:07
5.	"My Baby's Gone"	Hazel Houser	3:06
6.	"You Can't Make a Heel Toe the Mark"	Ray Pennington; Don Reno	2:09

== Chart performance ==
Chart (1967)	Peak position
US Top Country Albums (Billboard)	17

== Release history ==
Region	Date	Format	Label	Ref.
Canada; United States	March 1967	Vinyl	Capitol Records	
Taiwan	1968	Vinyl	Capitol Records	
United States	2010s	Digital; Streaming	Capitol Records Nashville	
