= Unfinished Business (Wanda Jackson album) =

Studio album by Wanda Jackson
- Released: October 9, 2012
- Recorded: 2012
- Genres: Country, blues, rockabilly
- Label: Sugar Hill
- Producer: Justin Townes Earle

Wanda Jackson chronology
Wanda Live! at Third Man Records (2011)	Unfinished Business (2012)	Encore (2021)

Unfinished Business is the 31st album by the American singer Wanda Jackson.

The album includes new material as well as cover versions of songs by singers and songwriters such as Townes Van Zandt, Etta James, Woody Guthrie and Bobby Womack/Shirley Womack.

The album draws upon her rockabilly and country roots and was produced by the Americana singer-songwriter Justin Townes Earle.

== Track listing ==
1. "I'm Tore Down"
2. "The Graveyard Shift"
3. "Am I Even a Memory" (featuring Justin Townes Earle)
4. "Pushover"
5. "It's All Over Now"
6. "Two Hands"
7. "Old Weakness"
8. "What Do You Do When You're Lonesome"
9. "Down Past the Bottom"
10. "California Stars"

== Personnel ==
- Drums – Bryan Owings
- Upright bass – Mike Bub
- Electric piano, organ, piano – Skylar Wilson
- Electric guitar, pedal steel – Paul Niehaus
- Electric guitar – Kenny Vaughan
- Harmonica on "Down Past The Bottom" – Cory Younts
- Acoustic guitar on "California Stars" – Justin Townes Earle
- Backup vocals – Cory Younts, Amanda Shires

== Chart performance ==
Chart (2012)	Peak position
US Billboard Top Country Albums	61
