= There's a Party Goin' On (Wanda Jackson album) =

Studio album by Wanda Jackson
- Released: January 1961
- Genre: Rock and roll; rockabilly
- Length: 29:17
- Label: Capitol
- Producer: Ken Nelson

Wanda Jackson chronology
Rockin' with Wanda (1960)	There's a Party Goin' On (1961)	Right or Wrong (1961)

There's a Party Goin' On is a studio album by country music and rockabilly singer Wanda Jackson. It was released in January 1961 by Capitol Records (catalog no. ST-1511). The album cover calls it "a collection of great country songs in the rhythmic singing style of Wanda Jackson."

AllMusic gave the album a rating of four stars. Reviewer Richie Unterberger called it "a pretty solid and energetic set" including "lightning-speed rockabilly riffing by Roy Clark."

== Track listing ==
Side A

1. "There's a Party Goin' On" (Don Covay, John Berry) [2:02]
2. "Lonely Week-Ends" (Charlie Rich) [2:20]
3. "Kansas City" (Jerry Leiber, Mike Stoller) [2:40]
4. "Bye Bye Baby" (Jule Styne, Leo Robin) [2:05]
5. "Fallin'" (Howard Greenfield, Neil Sedaka) [2:50]
6. "Hard Headed Woman" (Claude DeMetruis) [1:55]

Side B

1. "Tongue Tied" (Don Covay, John Berry, Mark Lewis) [2:22]
2. "It Doesn't Matter Anymore" (Paul Anka) [2:50]
3. "Tweedle Dee" (Winfield Scott) [2:40]
4. "Sparkling Brown Eyes" (Bill Cox) [2:35]
5. "Lost Week End" (Wayne Walker) [2:15]
6. "Man We Had a Party" (Jessie Mae Robinson) [1:58]
