= Fancy Satin Pillows =

Single by Wanda Jackson

from the album I've Gotta Sing
- B-side: "Why Don't We Love Like That Anymore"
- Released: November 1970
- Recorded: June 3, 1970; Nashville, Tennessee, U.S
- Genre: Country
- Label: Capitol
- Songwriters: Jerry Crutchfield, Dee Moeller
- Producer: Larry Butler

Wanda Jackson singles chronology
"Who Shot John" (1970)	"Fancy Satin Pillows" (1970)	"People Gotta Be Loving" (1971)

"Fancy Satin Pillows" is a song written by Jerry Crutchfield and Dee Moeller. It was recorded and released as a single by American country, rock, and Christian artist, Wanda Jackson.

The song was recorded at the Jack Clement Studio on June 3, 1970 in Nashville, Tennessee, United States. "Fancy Satin Pillows" was officially released as a single in November 1970, peaking at number thirteen on the Billboard Magazine Hot Country Singles chart. It was her final top-twenty single on that chart. The song was issued on Jackson's 1971 studio album, I've Gotta Sing.

In addition, "Fancy Satin Pillows" became Jackson's second song to chart the Canadian RPM Country Songs chart, reaching a peak position of number twenty-six.

== Chart performance ==
Chart (1971–1972)	Peak position
U.S. Billboard Hot Country Singles	13
CAN RPM Country Songs	26
