= I've Gotta Sing =

Studio album by Wanda Jackson
- Released: February 1971
- Recorded: February 1970 – June 1970
- Studio: Jack Clement Studio
- Genre: Country
- Label: Capitol
- Producer: Larry Butler

Wanda Jackson chronology
A Woman Lives for Love (1970)	I've Gotta Sing (1971)	Praise the Lord (1972)

Singles from I've Gotta Sing
- 1. "Fancy Satin Pillows" Released: November 1970

I've Gotta Sing is a studio album by American recording artist Wanda Jackson. It was released in February 1971 via Capitol Records and contained ten tracks. It was the seventeenth studio record released in Jackson's career and the seventeen released with the Capitol label. The project included one single release titled "Fancy Satin Pillows", which became a top 20 charting song on the American country music chart. I've Gotta Sing received a positive review from Billboard magazine following its original release.

== Background and recording ==
When first signed to Capitol Records in the 1950s, Wanda Jackson became known to audiences through a series of Rockabilly releases, including the top 40 pop single "Let's Have a Party". In 1961, she made the transition to country music and had two top ten charting singles that year. She continued releasing a series of country albums and singles during the decade, remaining popular in the field as well. In the early 1970s, Capitol continually changed producers on her recording sessions, according to Jackson. She was assigned to producer Larry Butler for I've Gotta Sing after having production disagreements with her prior producer, George Richey.

== Content ==
I've Gotta Sing contained a total of ten tracks. The album comprised a selection of country tracks. The album's liner notes explain the reason for its title: "A girl who has everything's just gotta sing...and Wanda Jackson's got all the talent there is," it explains. Both the title track and "I'm Gonna Walk Out of Your Life" were the album's only new tracks. The remaining songs were covers. Covers on the project include Conway Twitty's "Hello Darlin'", Simon and Garfunkel's "Bridge Over Troubled Water", The Four Preps' "Love of the Common People" and George Hamilton IV's "Break My Mind". The record was recorded between February and June 1970 at the Jack Clement Studio in Nashville, Tennessee.

== Release and reception ==
I've Gotta Sing was first released in February 1971 on Capitol Records, making it Jackson's seventeen studio album. It was also her seventeen album with Capitol. The album was originally issued as a vinyl LP, containing five songs on either side of the record. In later years, it was re-released to digital and streaming markets. The LP spent seven weeks on the Billboard Top Country Albums chart, peaking at number 19 in March 1971. It was her first album since 1968 to reach a charting position on the country albums survey. I've Gotta Sing received a positive review from Billboard magazine in their February issue of the magazine: "...this whole LP is packed with power sales power," writers concluded. The LP's only single release was "Fancy Satin Pillows", which was first issued in November 1970. The song became a top 20 charting single, peaking at number 13 on the Billboard Hot Country Songs chart in January 1971. It also charted at number 26 on the Canadian RPM Country Singles chart.

== Track listings ==
Side one
No.	Title	Writer(s)	Length
1.	"I've Gotta Sing"	Milton Blackford; Dan Wilson	2:36
2.	"Hello Darlin'"	Conway Twitty	2:24
3.	"Everything Is Beautiful"	Ray Stevens	3:32
4.	"Wonder Could I Live There Anymore"	Bill Rice	2:37
5.	"Bridge Over Troubled Water"	Paul Simon	3:46

Side two
No.	Title	Writer(s)	Length
1.	"Fancy Satin Pillows"	Jan Crutchfield; Dee Moeller	2:23
2.	"Break My Mind"	John D. Loudermilk	2:24
3.	"I'm Gonna Walk Out of Your Life"	Al Downing; Vernon Sandusky	2:19
4.	"Those Were the Days"	Gene Raskin	3:04
5.	"Love of the Common People"	John Hurley and Ronnie Wilkins	3:22

== Personnel ==
All credits are adapted from the liner notes of I've Gotta Sing.

- Larry Butler – Producer
- Pyramid Productions – Graphic illustrations
- Roland Young – Design

== Chart performance ==
Chart (1971)	Peak position
US Top Country Albums (Billboard)	19

== Release history ==
Region	Date	Format	Label	Ref.
Canada; United States	February 1971	Vinyl	Capitol Records	
United States	2010s	Digital; Streaming	Capitol Records Nashville	
