= Cream of the Crop (Wanda Jackson album) =

Studio album by Wanda Jackson and The Party Timers
- Released: August 1968
- Recorded: June 1967 – June 1968
- Studio: Columbia Studio
- Genres: Country; Honky Tonk
- Label: Capitol
- Producers: Kelso Herston; Ken Nelson

Wanda Jackson chronology
The Best of Wanda Jackson (1968)	Cream of the Crop (1968)	The Many Moods of Wanda Jackson (1968)

Singles from Cream of the Crop
- 1. "A Girl Don't Have to Drink to Have Fun" Released: October 1967; 2. "My Baby Walked Right Out on Me" Released: April 1968; 3. "Little Boy Soldier" Released: July 1968

Cream of the Crop is a studio album by American recording artist Wanda Jackson and her band The Party Timers. It was released in August 1968 via Capitol Records and contained 12 tracks. It was the twelfth studio album of Jackson's career and her second to give equal billing to The Party Timers. The project included three single releases, all of which reached charting positions on the North American country music sales chart. The album itself also reached charting positions in North America. Cream of the Crop received a positive review following its original release.

== Background and content ==
Wanda Jackson transitioned back into country music following a series of Rockabilly releases during the 1950s with songs like "Let's Have a Party". She had commercial success in 1961 with the country songs "Right or Wrong" and "In the Middle of a Heartache". She continued recording further country albums and singles during the 1960s and became more identified with the genre throughout the decade. Cream of the Crop was among the albums Jackson recorded for the country music field during this period. The project was recorded in sessions produced by Ken Nelson, along with Kelso Herston. It was Jackson's first album co-produced and to feature Herston on studio credits. The album was recorded between June 1967 and June 1968 at the Columbia Studio in Nashville, Tennessee. Cream of the Crop consisted of 12 recordings, all of which were composed by other songwriters besides Jackson. It was Jackson's second studio album to feature The Party Timers (her touring band), which was included performing various instruments and providing background vocals. The Party Timers were given equal billing on the album. The LP was a mixture of new recordings and cover versions of songs.

== Release and critical reception ==
Cream of the Crop was originally released in August 1968 on Capitol Records, making it Jackson's twelfth studio album. It was distributed as a vinyl LP, with six songs on either side of the record. In later decades, it was re-released through Capitol Records Nashville to digital and streaming markets, including Apple Music. The LP spent five weeks on the Billboard Top Country Albums chart in the United States, peaking at number 25 in October 1968. It was her sixth album to reach a peak position on the chart. The album received a positive response from Billboard magazine in their "album reviews" category. Writers highlighted the album's musical quality and further commented that "Wanda is one of the most polished of performers, and on this package she lends her talent to a variety of great tunes."

== Singles ==
Three singles included on the album preceded its release. The first single issued from the album was "A Girl Don't Have to Drink to Have Fun" in October 1967. In 1968, the track peaked at number 22 on the Billboard Hot Country Singles chart, eventually becoming the album's highest-charting single. In April 1968, "My Baby Walked Right Out on Me" was issued as the project's next single. Two months later, the single peaked at number 34 on the Billboard country singles survey. The final single included from the project was "Little Boy Soldier", which was issued in July 1968. Two months later, the track peaked at number 46 on the Billboard country chart.

== Track listings ==
Side one
No.	Title	Writer(s)	Length
1.	"Little Boy Soldier"	Curly Putman	2:39
2.	"Together Again"	Buck Owens	2:24
3.	"The Hurtin's All Over"	Harlan Howard	2:39
4.	"My Baby Walked Right Out on Me"	Curtiss Wayne	2:20
5.	"Don't Touch Me"	Hank Cochran	2:37
6.	"A Girl Don't Have to Drink to Have Fun"	Joe Nixon; Charlie Williams	2:39

Side two
No.	Title	Writer(s)	Length
1.	"Swinging Doors"	Merle Haggard	2:44
2.	"There Stands the Glass"	Autry Greisham; Russ Hull; Mary Jean Shurtz	2:37
3.	"I Talk a Pretty Story"	Yvonne DeVaney	2:34
4.	"I Betcha My Heart I Love You"	Bob Miller; Esther Van Sciver	2:17
5.	"No Place to Go But Home"	Howard	2:23
6.	"Wishing Well"	Bill Graham	2:09

== Chart performance ==
Chart (1968)	Peak position
US Top Country Albums (Billboard)	25

== Release history ==
Region	Date	Format	Label	Ref.
Canada; United Kingdom; United States	August 1968	Vinyl	Capitol Records	
Germany	August 1968	Vinyl	Capitol Records	
Taiwan	August 1968	Vinyl	Lux Records	
United States	2010s	Digital; Streaming	Capitol Records Nashville	
