= Wanda Jackson Sings Country Songs =

Studio album by Wanda Jackson
- Released: December 1965
- Recorded: 1960 – 1965
- Studios: Bradley Studios, Nashville, Tennessee; Columbia, Nashville, Tennessee; Capitol, Hollywood, California
- Genre: Country
- Label: Capitol
- Producer: Ken Nelson

Wanda Jackson chronology
Blues in My Heart (1965)	Wanda Jackson Sings Country Songs (1965)	Wanda Jackson Salutes the Country Music Hall of Fame (1966)

Singles from Wanda Jackson Sings Country Songs
- 1. "Little Charm Bracelet" Released: February 1961; 2. "One Teardrop at a Time" Released: December 1962; 3. "Slippin'" Released: October 1963; 4. "The Violet and the Rose" Released: March 1964; 5. "Kickin' Our Hearts Around" Released: January 1965; 6. "Have I Grown Used to Missing You" Released: June 1965; 7. "My First Day Without You" Released: September 1965

Wanda Jackson Sings Country Songs is a studio album by American recording artist Wanda Jackson. It was released in December 1965 via Capitol Records and contained 12 tracks. The album was Jackson's eighth studio record of her career and consisted of traditional country songs. Seven of these songs were released as singles between 1961 and 1965. Both "Slippin'" and "The Violet and the Rose" reached charting positions on the American country songs survey. The album received a positive review following its original release.

== Background and recording ==
After becoming known with international audiences as a Rockabilly performer, Wanda Jackson returned to the country music market in 1961. In 1959, a decision was made by Jackson's producer, Ken Nelson, to focus her career solely on the country field (since her original singles were more successful there). In 1961, she had top ten country singles with "Right or Wrong" and "In the Middle of a Heartache". Between 1960 and 1965, Jackson recorded sessions of traditional country material that would make up the studio album, Wanda Jackson Sings Country Songs. The sessions were held at the Bradley Studios and Columbia Studios in Nashville Tennessee. The project also contained sessions held at Capitol Studios, located in Hollywood, California.

== Content ==
The project contained a total of 12 tracks. Three songs were composed by Jackson herself: "Little Charm Bracelet", "Between the Window and the Phone" and "Kickin' Our Hearts Around". The latter recording was first released as a single by fellow country performer Buck Owens. Also included on the album was "The Violet and the Rose", a song made the most commercially-successful by Little Jimmy Dickens. Also included was a cover of Bill Anderson's "The Tip of My Fingers" and "Is This My Destiny", a song written by Helen Carter. The album was produced by Ken Nelson, who had recorded Jackson on the Capitol label since she signed a contract with them in 1956.

== Release and critical reception ==
Wanda Jackson Sings Country Songs was originally released in December 1965 on Capitol Records. It was the eighth studio album issued in Jackson's career. It was first distributed as a vinyl LP, containing six songs on either side of the record. In later decades, it was re-issued to digital and streaming sites, including Apple Music. The project received a positive review from Billboard magazine in their January 1966 issue. Reviewers praised the album's arrangement and highlighted the tracks "My First Day Without You" and "Send Me No Roses". Reviewers also said, "The country singer has a good package here, full of songs which are both poetic and tearful."

== Singles ==
A total of seven singles were included on the album, most of which were released prior to the album. The first single to be released was "Little Charm Bracelet" in February 1961. It was followed by "One Teardrop at a Time", which was released in December 1962. "Slippin'" was issued as a single in October 1963 and was the first to reach a charting position on any singles survey. Spending one week on the Billboard Hot Country Songs chart, "Slippin'" peaked at number 46 in January 1964.

Jackson's version of "The Violet and the Rose" followed as a single in March 1964. The song spent 11 weeks on the Billboard country singles chart and reached a peak position of 36 in June 1964. Jackson's version of "Kickin' Our Hearts Around" was then released as a single in January 1965. It was followed by "Have I Grown Used to Missing You" in June 1965 and "My First Day Without You" in September 1965. Despite having charting singles, the album itself did not reach any charting positions on the Billboard Top Country Albums list.

== Track listings ==
Side one
No.	Title	Writer(s)	Length
1.	"My First Day Without You"	Scott Turner; Charlie Williams	2:00
2.	"Send Me No Roses"	Hank Mills	2:21
3.	"The Tip of My Fingers"	Bill Anderson	2:48
4.	"Between the Window and the Phone"	L.D. Allen; Wanda Jackson	2:17
5.	"My Destiny"	Helen Carter	2:23
6.	"Kickin' Our Hearts Around"	Wanda Jackson	2:15

Side two
No.	Title	Writer(s)	Length
1.	"Have I Grown Used to Missing You"	Ned Miller	2:00
2.	"Slippin'"	Charles "Fuzzy" Owen	2:45
3.	"Little Charm Bracelet"	Jackson	2:28
4.	"The Violet and the Rose"	Billy Auge; Little Jimmy Dickens; John Reinfield; Mel Tillis	2:50
5.	"Take Me Home"	Vaughn Horton	2:27
6.	"One Teardrop at a Time"	Eddie Miller; Betty West	2:23

== Release history ==
Region	Date	Format	Label	Ref.
Japan	December 1965	Vinyl	Capitol Records	
Canada; United States	December 1965	Vinyl	Capitol Records	
United Kingdom	1966	Vinyl	Capitol Records	
Taiwan	1968	Vinyl	Capitol Records	
Australia	1971	Vinyl	World Record Club	
United States	2010s	Digital; Streaming	Capitol Records Nashville	
