= You'll Always Have My Love =

Studio album by Wanda Jackson and the Party Timers
- Released: September 1967
- Recorded: 1966 – 1967
- Studio: Columbia Studio
- Genre: Country
- Label: Capitol
- Producer: Ken Nelson

Wanda Jackson chronology
| Reckless Love Affair (1967) | You'll Always Have My Love (1967) | Made in Germany (1967) |

Singles from You'll Always Have My Love
- 1. "Both Sides of the Line" Released: March 1967; 2. "You'll Always Have My Love" Released: July 1967

You'll Always Have My Love is a studio album by American recording artist Wanda Jackson, along with her band The Party Timers. It included a total of 12 tracks and was Jackson's eleventh studio album release in her career. It was Jackson's first album that gave credit to The Party Timers. Two singles were included on the album: "Both Sides of the Line" and the title track. The recordings both reached chart positions on the American country chart in 1967, along with the album as well.

== Background ==
Wanda Jackson released a series of Rockabilly-styled singles and albums during the late 1950s, including the top 40 pop hit "Let's Have a Party". In 1961, Jackson returned to her country music roots and scored two top-ten hits that year. Throughout the remainder of the 1960s, she became increasingly identified with the country music audience through her various releases. In the mid 1960s, Jackson renamed her touring band The Party Timers. The group was occasionally featured on Jackson's recordings issued through the Capitol label. You'll Always Have My Love was the first Capitol studio album that included the band and they were given equal credit on the LP.

== Recording and content ==
The album included background harmonies from The Party Timers, while Jackson continued performing lead vocals. According to the LP liner notes, the songs were a collection of love songs, and “Wanda once again proves more than wonderfully equal to the challenge of singing.” A total of 12 tracks were included on the album. Two of the album's recordings were composed by Jan Paxton, which were "Who Do You Go To" and "Half That's Mine". Additionally, Vic McAlpin contributed two tracks to the album, along with Yvonne DeVaney. "My Heart Gets Al the Breaks" was composed by singer and songwriter Justin Tubb. You'll Always Have My Love was recorded at the Columbia Studio, located in Nashville, Tennessee in sessions held between 1966 and 1967. The album was produced by Ken Nelson.

== Release and singles ==
You'll Always Have My Love was released in September 1967 on Capitol Records and was Jackson's eleventh studio release in America. The disc was originally issued as a vinyl LP, containing six songs on either side of the record. In later decades, the album was re-released to digital and streaming sites, including Apple Music. The album spent eight weeks on the Billboard Top Country Albums chart in the United States, peaking at number 25 in November 1967. It was Jackson's fourth album to reach a peak position on the chart. Two singles were included on the project, beginning with "Both Sides of the Line" in March 1967. It spent 12 weeks on the Billboard Hot Country Singles chart, peaking at number 21 in June 1967. The title track was released as the second single in July 1967. The song spent two weeks on the Billboard country songs chart before peaking at number 64 in August 1967.

== Track listings ==
Side one
| No. | Title | Writer(s) | Length |
|---|---|---|---|
| 1. | "You'll Always Have My Love" | Yvonne DeVaney | 2:39 |
| 2. | "My Days Are Darker Than Your Nights" | Anne Bruce | 2:32 |
| 3. | "Memory Maker" | Dave Burgess; Janet Thomas | 2:25 |
| 4. | "Who Do You Go To?" | Jan Paxton | 2:39 |
| 5. | "I'd Like to Help You Out" | Larry Lee | 2:13 |
| 6. | "It'll Take Awhile" | Curtis Wayne | 2:35 |

Side two
| No. | Title | Writer(s) | Length |
|---|---|---|---|
| 1. | "Both Sides of the Line" | Marian Francis | 2:19 |
| 2. | "My Heart Gets All the Breaks" | Justin Tubb | 2:08 |
| 3. | "I'm the Queen of My Lonely Little World" | Vic McAlpin | 2:30 |
| 4. | "The Half That's Mine" | Paxton | 2:03 |
| 5. | "Famous Last Words" | DeVaney | 2:15 |
| 6. | "This Time's the Next Time" | McAlpin | 2:03 |

== Chart performance ==
| Chart (1967) | Peak position |
|---|---|
| US Top Country Albums (Billboard) | 25 |

== Release history ==
| Region | Date | Format | Label | Ref. |
|---|---|---|---|---|
| Germany | September 1967 | Vinyl | Capitol Records | |
| United Kingdom; United States | September 1967 | Vinyl | Capitol Records | |
| United States | 2010s | Digital; streaming | Capitol Records Nashville | |
