= Wanda Jackson Salutes the Country Music Hall of Fame =

Studio album by Wanda Jackson
- Released: September 1966
- Recorded: July 1966
- Studio: Capitol (Hollywood)
- Genre: Country
- Label: Capitol
- Producer: Ken Nelson

Wanda Jackson chronology
Wanda Jackson Sings Country Songs (1965)	Wanda Jackson Salutes the Country Music Hall of Fame (1966)	Reckless Love Affair (1967)

Wanda Jackson Salutes the Country Music Hall of Fame is a studio album by American recording artist Wanda Jackson. It was released in September 1966 via Capitol Records and contained 12 tracks. The album was a collection of cover songs recorded by country artists that have been inducted into the Country Music Hall of Fame and Museum. It was the ninth studio release of Jackson's career and the second to reach a charting position on the American country survey.

== Background ==
Wanda Jackson transitioned back to the country music market following several years of making Rockabilly recordings for the Capitol label. She saw commercial success with the country songs like 1961's "Right or Wrong" and "In the Middle of a Heartache". Through the remainder of the decade she became prolific in the country field with albums and singles. Wanda Jackson Salutes the Country Music Hall of Fame was another project focused towards this audience. The album was made as a tribute to Jackson's favorite performers who had been inducted into the Country Music Hall of Fame and Museum. "So in recording this album, we are offering a grateful salute to these five performing pioneers of country music," Jackson wrote in the liner notes.

== Content and recording ==
The project consisted of 12 tracks in total and were composed by other performers. As stated in the liner notes, Jackson chose songs from five Hall of Fame performers to include on the album. She chose Roy Acuff, Ernest Tubb, Tex Ritter, Jimmie Rodgers and Hank Williams. Covers included "Jambalaya (On the Bayou)", Wabash Cannonball" and "Soldier's Last Letter". The album was recorded in July 1966 at Capitol Studios located in Hollywood, California. The album was produced by Ken Nelson.

== Release and reception ==
Professional ratings
Review scores
Source	Rating
Allmusic	3/5 stars

Wanda Jackson Salutes the Country Music Hall of Fame was released in July 1966 on Capitol Records. The album was Jackson's ninth studio recording of her career. It was originally distributed as a vinyl LP, containing six tracks on either side of the record. The record was Jackson's second to reach a charting position on the Billboard Top Country Albums survey, peaking at number 12 after spending ten weeks there. It received a three-star rating from AllMusic in later years. Three decades following its original release, Jackson donated the guitar featured on the album's cover to the Country Music Hall of Fame and Museum.

== Track listing ==
Side one
No.	Title	Writer(s)	Original artist(s)	Length
1.	"Jambalaya (On the Bayou)"	Hank Williams	Hank Williams	1:56
2.	"Try Me One More Time"	Ernest Tubb	Ernest Tubb	2:34
3.	"There's a New Moon Over My Shoulder"	Lee Blastic; Jimmie Davis; Ekko Whelan	Tex Ritter	2:15
4.	"Blue Yodel No. 6"	Jimmie Rodgers	Jimmie Rodgers	2:48
5.	"Fire Ball Mail"	Floyd Jenkins	Roy Acuff	2:00
6.	"Let's Said Goodbye Like We Said Hello"	Jimmie Skinner; Tubb	Ernest Tubb	2:31

Side two
No.	Title	Writer(s)	Original artist(s)	Length
1.	"Jealous Heart"	Jenny Lou Carson	Tex Ritter	2:31
2.	"The Great Speckled Bird"	Traditional	Roy Acuff	2:51
3.	"The Soldier's Last Letter"	Redd Stewart; Tubb	Ernest Tubb	3:13
4.	"You Win Again"	Williams	Hank Williams	2:40
5.	"Wabash Cannon Ball"	A.P. Carter	Roy Acuff	2:36
6.	"Tuck Away My Lonesome Blues"	Rodgers	Jimmie Rodgers	1:58

== Chart performance ==
Chart (1966)	Peak position
US Top Country Albums (Billboard)	12

== Release history ==
Region	Date	Format	Label	Ref.
China	September 1966	Vinyl	Capitol Records	
Sweden	September 1966	Vinyl	Capitol Records	
United Kingdom; United States	September 1966	Vinyl	Capitol Records	
Netherlands	1967	Vinyl	Capitol Records	
