= A Woman Lives for Love (album) =

Studio album by Wanda Jackson
- Released: August 1970
- Recorded: December 1969 – February 1970
- Studio: Jack Clement Studio
- Genre: Country
- Label: Capitol
- Producer: George Richey

Wanda Jackson chronology
| Wanda Jackson Country! (1970) | A Woman Lives for Love (1970) | I've Gotta Sing (1971) |

Singles from A Woman Lives for Love
- 1. "A Woman Lives for Love" Released: March 1970

A Woman Lives for Love is a studio album by American recording artist Wanda Jackson. It was released in August 1970 via Capitol Records and contained ten tracks. It was the sixteenth studio album released in Jackson's career and the first to be solely-produced by George Richey. The album's title track, became a top 20 charting single on the American country chart prior to the album's original release. A Woman Lives for Love received a positive review from Billboard magazine in 1970.

== Background and recording ==
In the 1950s, Wanda Jackson became known to Rockabilly audiences with recordings like "Fujiyama Mama" and the top 40 pop hit "Let's Have a Party". In 1961, she made the transition to country music and had two charting top ten hits. She became more popular with the country market throughout the decade with a series of albums and single releases. A Woman Lives for Love was one of Jackson's studio recordings made exclusively for this audience. It was recorded between December 1969 and February 1970 at the Jack Clement Studio in Nashville, Tennessee. The sessions were produced by George Richey. It was her first album to be entirely produced by him. In her autobiography, Jackson explained her dissatisfaction with Richey's production work on the album, commenting that his lack of feedback "just made me mad". Following the album's release, Jackson told Capitol Records that she did not want to continue working with Richey.

== Content ==
A Woman Lives for Love was a concept album that centered around love songs. "Everyone loves 'til it hurts at least once in their lives, and this album is made for every one of these people," the liner notes explain. A total of ten tracks comprised the project. The title track was composed by George Richey, along with Glenn Sutton and Norro Wilson. Also included on the album was a cover of Tammy Wynette's "Stand by Your Man". Additional covers included Jerry Lee Lewis' "One Minute Past Eternity", Wynn Stewart's "It's Such a Pretty World Today", George Jones' "Walk Through This World with Me" and Sonny James' "You're the Only World I Know".

== Release and reception ==
A Woman Lives for Love was originally released in August 1970 on Capitol Records. It was Jackson's sixteenth studio recording in her career and the sixteenth released with Capitol. The project was originally issued as a vinyl LP, containing five songs on either side of the record. In later decades, the album was re-released through Capitol Records Nashville to digital and streaming markets, including Apple Music. The LP received a positive response from Billboard magazine in 1970, who praised the album in their review: "Well-produced and sure to move well in stores," writers concluded. The album's title track was the only single included and was originally released to radio in March 1970. The song became a top 20 charting single on the Billboard Hot Country Singles survey, peaking at number 17 in May 1970. It was Jackson's eighth top 20 single on the chart and among her final to reach the top 20 in her career.

== Track listing ==
Side one
| No. | Title | Writer(s) | Length |
|---|---|---|---|
| 1. | "A Woman Lives for Love" | George Richey; Glenn Sutton; Norro Wilson | 2:46 |
| 2. | "It's Such a Pretty World Today" | Dale Noe | 2:14 |
| 3. | "Stop the World" | Yvonne DeVaney | 2:27 |
| 4. | "The Dirt Behind My Years" | Dale Davis; LeRoy Goates | 2:35 |
| 5. | "Walk Through This World with Me" | Kay Savage; Sandy Seamons | 2:24 |

Side two
| No. | Title | Writer(s) | Length |
|---|---|---|---|
| 1. | "Stand by Your Man" | Billy Sherrill; Tammy Wynette | 2:38 |
| 2. | "You're the Only World I Know" | Sonny James; Robert Tubert | 3:03 |
| 3. | "One Minute Past Eternity" | Stanley Kesler; William E. Taylor | 2:26 |
| 4. | "Let Trouble Be You" | DeVaney | 2:16 |
| 5. | "I'd Fight the World" | Joe Allison; Hank Cochran | 2:20 |

== Release history ==
| Region | Date | Format | Label | Ref. |
|---|---|---|---|---|
| United States | August 1970 | Vinyl | Capitol Records | |
| Australia | 1972 | Vinyl | World Record Club | |
| United States | 2010s | Digital; Streaming | Capitol Records Nashville | |
