= I Already Know (What I'm Getting for My Birthday) =

Single by Wanda Jackson

from the album I Wouldn't Want You Any Other Way
- B-side: "The Man You Could Have Been"
- Released: October 1971
- Recorded: May 1971
- Studio: Jack Clement Studio
- Genre: Country
- Length: 2:02
- Label: Capitol
- Songwriter: E. Williams and R. Williams
- Producer: Larry Butler

Wanda Jackson singles chronology
"Back Then" (1971)	"I Already Know (What I'm Getting for My Birthday)" (1971)	"I'll Be Whatever You Say" (1971)

"I Already Know (What I'm Getting for My Birthday)" is a song written that was originally recorded by American singer, Wanda Jackson. The up-tempo country tune was released as a single by Capitol Records in October 1971 and made the US country top-40, becoming her last single to do so.

== Background and recording ==
Best-known for her rock and roll recordings from the 1950s, Wanda Jackson also recorded in the country field and placed a series of songs in the US country top-40 between the 1950s and 1970s. In the 1971, Jackson became a Christian, which influenced her to record more gospel including an album of spiritual tunes in 1971. Despite urges to record more gospel, Capitol Records pressured Jackson to continue cutting country music. One of her singles from this era included "I Already Know (What I'm Getting for My Birthday)". The song was written Liz Anderson but credited under the pseudonym "E. Williams and R. Williams". The song was produced by Larry Butler at the Jack Clement Studio, located in Nashville, Tennessee. The session took place in May 1971. The song was described as an up-tempo rhythm tune by both Billboard and Cash Box.

== Release, critical reception and chart performance ==
"I Already Know (What I'm Getting for My Birthday)" was released as a single by Capitol in October 1971 and was offered as a seven-inch vinyl disc that included a B-side titled "The Man You Could Have Been". It was given positive reviews by both Billboard and Cash Box who described it as "cute" and "dynamite". It debuted on the US Billboard Hot Country Songs chart on November 27, 1971 where it spent 11 weeks, peaking at the number 35 position on January 15, 1972. It became Jackson's eighteenth top-40 placement on the US country chart and the final in her career to do so. It was later included on her 1972 album I Wouldn't Want You Any Other Way.

== Track listings ==
7" vinyl single

- "I Already Know (What I'm Getting for My Birthday)" – 2:02
- "The Man You Could Have Been" – 2:24

== Chart performance ==
Chart (1971–1972)	Peak position
US Hot Country Songs (Billboard)	35
