= Nelson King =

American DJ

Nelson King (August 7, 1914 – March 16, 1974) was an American radio disc jockey (DJ) with a nationwide following. Credited by many historians as among the most influential country music DJs in the post-World War II era, the "King of the country deejays" was posthumously inducted into the Country Music DJ Hall of Fame in 1975.

Born Charles Schroeder in Portsmouth, Ohio, he graduated from Portsmouth High School in 1932. He worked at radio stations in various cities, as an announcer with "his resonant speaking voice", musical director, and host of Jam for Supper, a recorded music program, before joining WCKY in Cincinnati in January 1946.

It was at WCKY that he was asked to choose a radio name, which he picked from a telephone book. (He later legally changed his name to Nelson King.) He hosted several programs, but it was Hillbilly Jamboree which made him famous. Launched in 1946, the nightly show fueled the growing popularity of country music. The 4½ hour program garnered a national audience and was also heard in Canada, Mexico, and parts of South America. King was courted by record companies and stars such as Gene Autry and Eddy Arnold. He was the top DJ in Billboard magazine polls for eight consecutive years. He even recorded for King Records. Eventually, however, alcoholism ended his career at WCKY; he was fired in 1961 for going on the air while drunk. He found employment outside of radio, but returned to work as a morning DJ for Cincinnati's WCLU from 1968 to 1970.

Nelson King died of lung cancer in 1974.
