= By the Time I Get to Phoenix =

By the Time I Get to Phoenix may refer to:

- By the Time I Get to Phoenix (Glen Campbell album), 1967
  - "By the Time I Get to Phoenix" (song), the title song
- By the Time I Get to Phoenix (Injury Reserve album), 2021
- By the Time I Get to Phoenix (Marty Robbins album), 1968

== See also ==
- "By the Time I Get to Arizona"
