= Praise the Lord (album) =

Studio album by Wanda Jackson
- Released: March 1972
- Recorded: January 1971 – December 1971
- Studio: Jack Clement Studio
- Genres: Country gospel; Spiritual
- Label: Capitol
- Producers: Larry Butler; Bill Walker

Wanda Jackson chronology
I've Gotta Sing (1971)	Praise the Lord (1972)	I Wouldn't Want You Any Other Way (1972)

Singles from Praise the Lord
- 1. "People Gotta Be Loving" Released: February 1971

Praise the Lord is a studio album by American recording artist Wanda Jackson. It was released in March 1972 via Capitol Records and contained ten tracks. The project was Jackson's eighteenth studio recording and her first collection of gospel music. The album would be among a series of gospel recordings Jackson would make in her career following a rediscovery of religion. The album produced one single and received a positive review from Billboard in 1971.

== Background and recording ==
Wanda Jackson made her first recordings with Capitol Records as a Rockabilly performer, which included the top 40 pop hit "Let's Have a Party". She then transitioned into country music in 1961 and had several major charting singles during the decade, including "Right or Wrong". In 1971, Jackson and her husband rediscovered Christianity and she decided to record more Gospel material following this realization. Her first Gospel release would be 1972's Praise the Lord. The album was recorded between January and December 1971 at the Jack Clement Studio in Nashville, Tennessee. It was co-produced by Larry Butler and Bill Walker.

== Content ==
Praise the Lord consisted of ten tracks of gospel material. Included was a song composed by Jackson herself titled "My Testimony". In her autobiography, Jackson explained that "My Testimony" was the first gospel song she ever wrote. "...I just opened up my heart and shared what happened in my life," she recalled. More recordings were also included, such as "People Gotta Be Loving", which featured The Oak Ridge Boys. Other tracks on the album were covers of previously recorded gospel songs, such as "Oh Happy Day", "How Great Thou Art" and "Battle Hymn of the Republic". The album's cover was taken at Jackson's first gospel concert, which was held in Las Vegas, Nevada.

== Release and reception ==
Praise the Lord was released on Capitol Records in March 1972 and was Jackson's eighteenth studio album in her career. It was originally issued as a vinyl LP, containing five songs on either side of the record. In later decades, the album was re-released on Capitol Records Nashville to digital and streaming markets, including Apple Music. The original LP received a positive review from Billboard magazine in their April 1972 issue. Writers of the review highlighted tracks like "Didn't He Shine" and "Am I Not My Brother's Keeper". They also commented that the project is "a beautiful spiritual album, a very personal story by Wanda Jackson." The album included on single release, which was "People Gotta Be Loving". The song was released as a single on Capitol Records in February 1971, with credit also given to The Oak Ridge Boys.

== Track listings ==
Side one
No.	Title	Writer(s)	Length
1.	"The King Is Coming"	William J. Gaither	3:26
2.	"My Testimony"	Wanda Jackson	2:16
3.	"Didn't He Shine"	Bob McDill; Allen Reynolds	3:30
4.	"He Gives Us All His Love"	Randy Newman	2:48
5.	"People Gotta Be Loving"	Yvonne DeVaney	2:06

Side two
No.	Title	Writer(s)	Length
1.	"How Great Thou Art"	Stuart K. Hine	3:10
2.	"Am I Not Brother's Keeper"	Larry Henley; Kenny O'Dell	2:33
3.	"Oh Happy Day"	Edwin Hawkins	4:22
4.	"He's the Man"	Wendell Goodman; Walt Schultz, Jr.	2:42
5.	"Battle Hymn of the Republic"	Julia Ward Howe; William Steffe	3:22

== Personnel ==
All credits are adapted from the liner notes of Praise the Lord.

Technical personnel

- Larry Butler – Producer
- Reverend Paul Salyer – Liner Notes
- Bill Walker – Producer

== Release history ==
Region	Date	Format	Label	Ref.
Canada; United States	March 1972	Vinyl	Capitol Records	
United States	1985	Cassette	Capitol Records	
United States	2010s	Digital; Streaming	Capitol Records Nashville	
