= Mek Pek =

Danish singer and actor from Aarhus (born 1964)

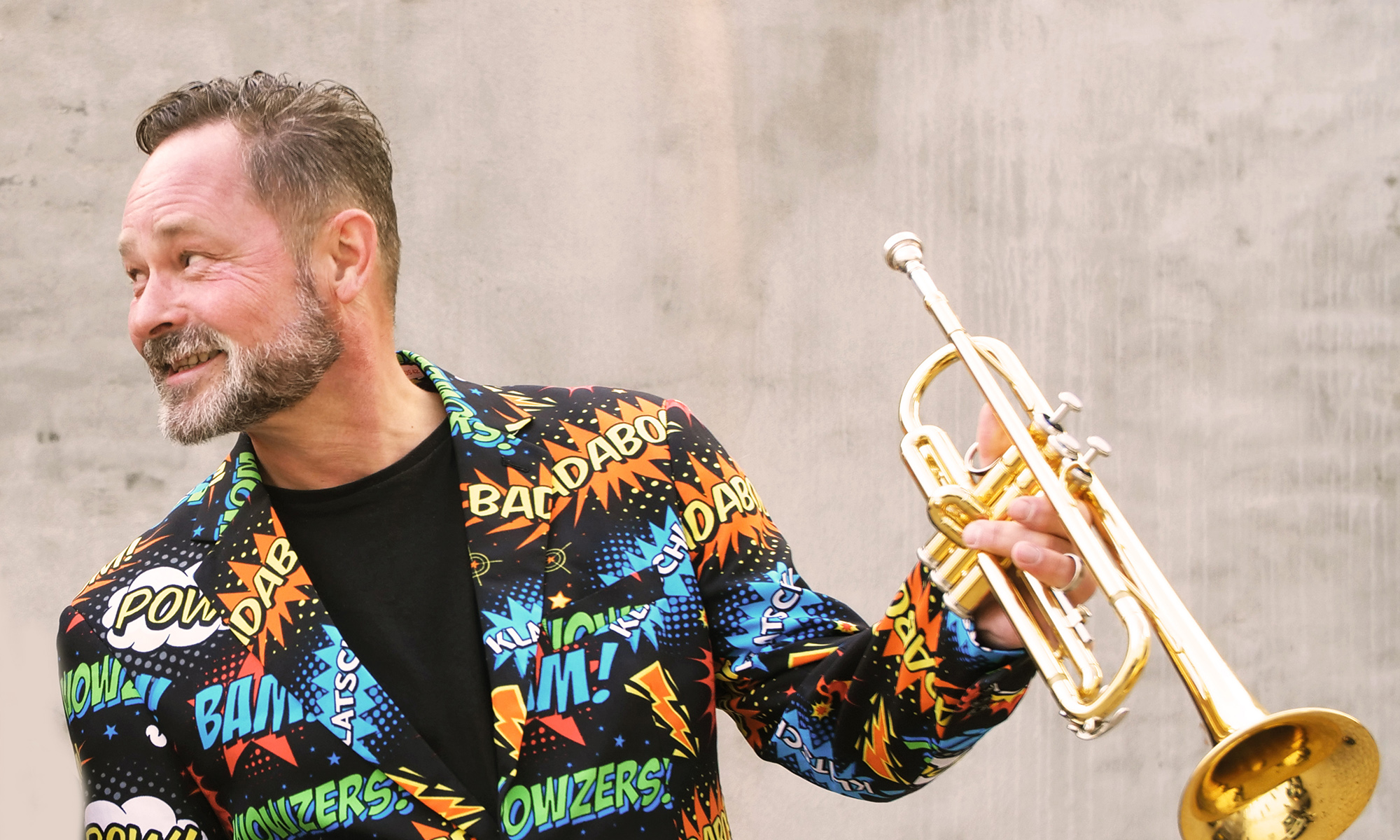
- Born: 4 January 1964; Aarhus, Denmark
- Occupations: Musician; Singer; Actor; Entertainer
- Years active: 1979-present
- Known for: Jungledyret Hugo
- Website: mekpek.dk/om-mek-pek

Mek Pek (born 4 January 1964) is a Danish singer and actor from Aarhus. Mek started his career in 1979 in the punk band Lost Kids in which he played the bass. Lost Kids eventually dissolved as a band and in 1982 he started his own band called Mek Pek Party Band. In 1995 he started The Allrights which he performed with under the name Mek Pek & The Allrights. Between 1990 and 2000 he worked with Kim Larsen and Peter A.G. Nielsen from the band Gnags. In 1999 he published the album Pek'en Passer, a tribute to Dirch Passer. Mek Pek has been active as an actor in several movies such as Casanova and Hvor kommer mælk fra? and television ads. He has published albums for children and has been voted the sexiest man in Aarhus in 1987.

== Timeline ==
- 1979: Lost Kids
- 1982: Mek Pek Party Band
- 1995: The Allrights
- 1999: Pek'en Passer
- 2003: Hvor kommer mælk fra?
- 2004: Ann & Aberne
- 2005: Anton & Sassabassa
- 2011: Mek Pek Party Band 30 år jubilæum
