= Wanda Jackson =

American singer, songwriter, and musician (born 1937)

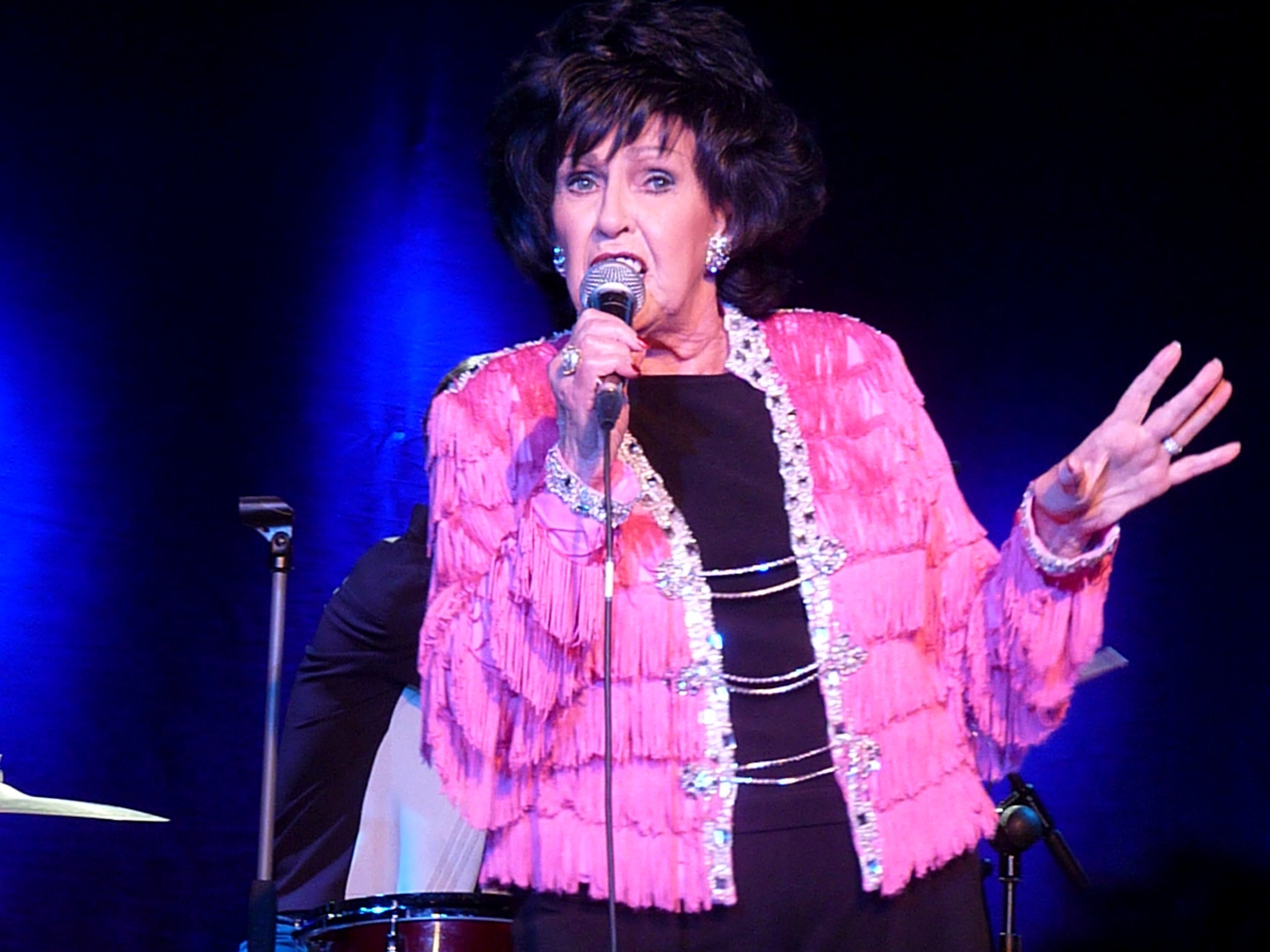
- Jackson in concert, 2011
- Born: Wanda LaVonne Jackson; October 20, 1937 (age 89); Maud, Oklahoma, U.S.
- Occupations: Singer; songwriter
- Years active: 1953–2021
- Works: Albums; singles
- Spouse: Wendell Goodman (m. 1961; died 2017)
- Musical career
- Genres: Rockabilly; rock and roll; country; gospel
- Instruments: Vocals; guitar; piano
- Labels: Decca; Capitol; Myrrh; Word; Deep Sea; Christian World; Vine; Tab; Supraphon; Amethyst; Elap; Success; CMH; Goldenlane; Third Man; Sugar Hill; Big Machine

Wanda LaVonne Jackson (born October 20, 1937) is an American singer and songwriter. Since the 1950s, she has recorded and released music in the genres of rock, country, and gospel. She was among the first women to have a career in rock and roll, recording a series of 1950s singles that helped give her the nickname "the Queen of Rockabilly". She is also counted among the first female stars in the genre of country music.

Jackson began performing as a child and later had her own radio show in Oklahoma City. She was then discovered by country singer Hank Thompson, who helped her secure a recording contract with Decca Records in 1954. At Decca, Jackson had her first hit single with the country song "You Can't Have My Love". She began touring the following year with Elvis Presley. The two briefly dated and Presley encouraged her to record in the rockabilly style. In 1956, Jackson signed with Capitol Records, where she was given full permission to record both country and rockabilly. The label released a string of Jackson's rock singles, including "Fujiyama Mama", "Mean Mean Man", and the top-40 hit "Let's Have a Party".

In the 1960s, Jackson moved back to country music and had several charting singles during the decade, including "Right or Wrong", "In the Middle of a Heartache", "Tears Will Be the Chaser for Your Wine", and "A Woman Lives for Love". In addition, she also recorded several selections for the German-language market overseas. In 1965, her German single "Santo Domingo" reached number one on the Austrian pop chart. After rediscovering Christianity in 1971, Jackson made gospel music a priority in her career. She left Capitol Records in 1973 and signed with Word Records to focus more on the gospel circuit. Over the next two decades, she released a series of gospel records.

In 1984, Jackson was sought out by European promoters to tour overseas. The same year, she released her first rock album in two decades and launched a new career in the genre. In the 1990s, her rock records were noticed again by American audiences, and she began touring alongside fellow rockabilly artist Rosie Flores. During this period, she released several commercially acclaimed albums in the rock-and-roll style, including Heart Trouble (2003) and I Remember Elvis (2006). Following her 2009 induction into the Rock and Roll Hall of Fame, Jackson collaborated with musician Jack White to record the commercially successful The Party Ain't Over. For several years, she kept a busy touring schedule before announcing her retirement from performing in 2019. She released her 32nd and final studio project, Encore, in 2021.

== Early life ==
Jackson was the only child of Tom and Nellie Jackson in Maud, Oklahoma. Her father worked multiple jobs, including a gas-station attendant and delivery-truck driver. He also played music in a local band alongside his brother. Because of limited opportunities in Maud, the family moved to Los Angeles, California, in 1941. Jackson often sang alongside her parents at home. Nellie Jackson often had Jackson sing while she was out of sight, to ensure her daughter was accounted for. In Los Angeles, Jackson was introduced to western swing music. She enjoyed hearing music by popular western acts such as Bob Wills and Rose Maddox. When she was six years old, her father introduced Jackson to the guitar. She also took guitar lessons and was soon skillful enough to play it alongside her father.

In the mid-1940s, the family relocated to Bakersfield, California, where Tom Jackson took a job as a barber. She also took piano lessons and continued to play the guitar. During this period, she began having trouble with academics. Jackson recalled the experience in her autobiography: "All I wanted to do was sing and play music, and it was impossible for me to sit still." When Jackson was nine, the family moved back to their home state, this time living in Oklahoma City. Her father found employment as a taxicab driver, and her mother worked on an air force base.

In Oklahoma City, Jackson sang in the local Baptist church and engaged in more performance opportunities. She auditioned for the local radio station, KLPR, after being pressured by peers. She was featured on one program, which impressed the station's disc jockey, who encouraged her to audition for a second KLPR contest. Jackson won the second contest at KLPR, which allotted Jackson her own 15-minute radio segment. On the show, Jackson performed a set of country songs and recalled having little understanding of how to host a radio show. "I was flying by the seat of my pants, but it didn't scare me to get out on a limb and try something brand new. I liked it," she explained in her biography.

As a teenager, Jackson attended Capitol Hill High School in Oklahoma City and continued her radio show. She also dated fellow student Leonard Sipes, who would later go by the name Tommy Collins. In 1952, Jackson was heard on the air by country singer and local resident, Hank Thompson. The singer invited Jackson to perform with him at the Trianon Ballroom in Oklahoma City. On Thompson's show, Jackson sang "Blue Yodel No. 6" backed by his band, the Brazos Valley Boys. The performance led to a regular gig singing alongside Merl Lindsay's country band. Jackson was always performing, but at times neglected her social life. "[Wanda] never had time for dates, nothing like that. Just that guitar – that's all she thought about," a high-school friend recalled.

== Career ==
=== 1953–1955: Country beginnings ===
Jackson also continued working with Hank Thompson. In 1953, she appeared with him regularly on his local television program and on a similar program for 30 minutes hosted by KLPR. Thompson also recorded Jackson on several demonstration tapes in hopes they would be heard by major record labels. Thompson was also attempting to get his band member Billy Gray a recording contract and had the pair sing several duets. Jackson was supposed to be signed by Thompson's label, Capitol Records, but was rejected by producer Ken Nelson. "Girls don't sell records!", he told Thompson. In her book, Jackson recalled hearing Nelson's statement: "I recognize that Ken wasn't being sexist, so much as he was thinking about business. But it still gave me a little nudge to prove him wrong!"

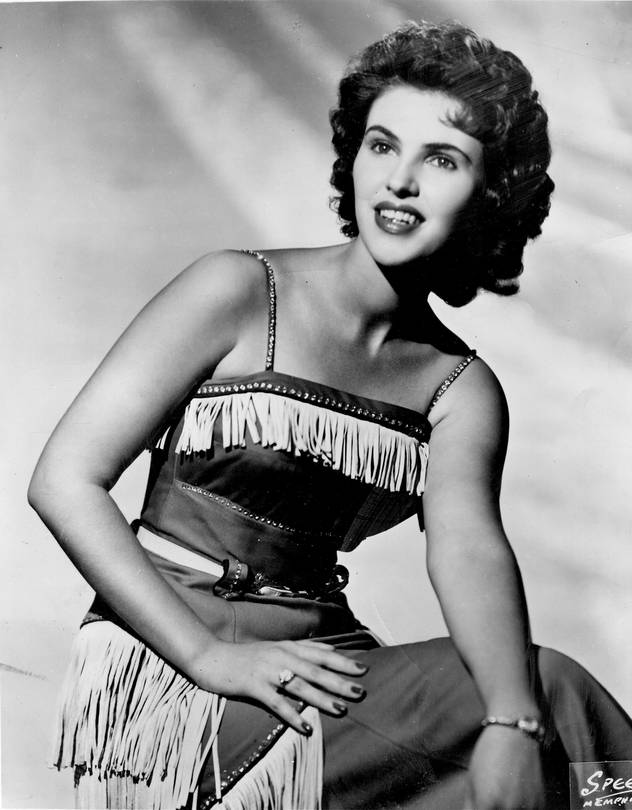
Jackson was known for her spaghetti-strap dresses, designed by her mother.

Instead, Thompson contacted Paul Cohen of Decca Records, who was interested in signing Jackson and Billy Gray. In 1954, while still high school, Jackson signed with the label. In March 1954, the Jackson family traveled to Hollywood, California, where she recorded her first Decca sessions backed by Thompson's band. She cut several solo sides, along with the Billy Gray duet, "You Can't Have My Love". Jackson disliked the song, but Thompson convinced her to record it. It was soon released as Jackson's debut single on Decca and reached the top 10, climbing to number eight on the U.S. country songs chart. With Decca's encouragement, Jackson and Gray recorded a second duet, titled "If You Don't Somebody Else Will". Released as a single, the song was a commercial failure due to a competing version by Jimmy & Johnny that reached the charts.

Instead of touring, Jackson started her senior year in fall 1954 and finished high school. She was part of the school band and acted in the musical Anything Goes. In March 1955, she returned to the recording studio, this time working with Paul Cohen at the Decca studio in Nashville, Tennessee. Jackson also did her first performance on the Grand Ole Opry while in town. For the performance, her mother made a dress fitted with spaghetti straps and a sweetheart neckline. Host Ernest Tubb told her it was unacceptable, so she covered it with a fringe jacket. She later recalled hearing fellow Opry members making negative comments about her while she was onstage. "I decided that night that the Grand Ole Opry scene was not for me," she recounted.

In 1955, Jackson graduated from Capitol Hill High School in Oklahoma City and began touring. Jackson's father quit his job to become her full-time manager, and he hired Bob Neal to book her engagements. Jackson's first concert dates included up-and-coming performer Elvis Presley. Together, the pair worked multiple shows alongside several other country performers in the United States that year. Jackson's father chaperoned her during the shows and drove her from one date to the next. Presley encouraged her to perform rock-and-roll music. He played her several rhythm-and-blues records and informed her of rock's growing popularity. Jackson also joined the cast of the Ozark Jubilee in 1955.

=== 1956–1960: Rock-and-roll years ===
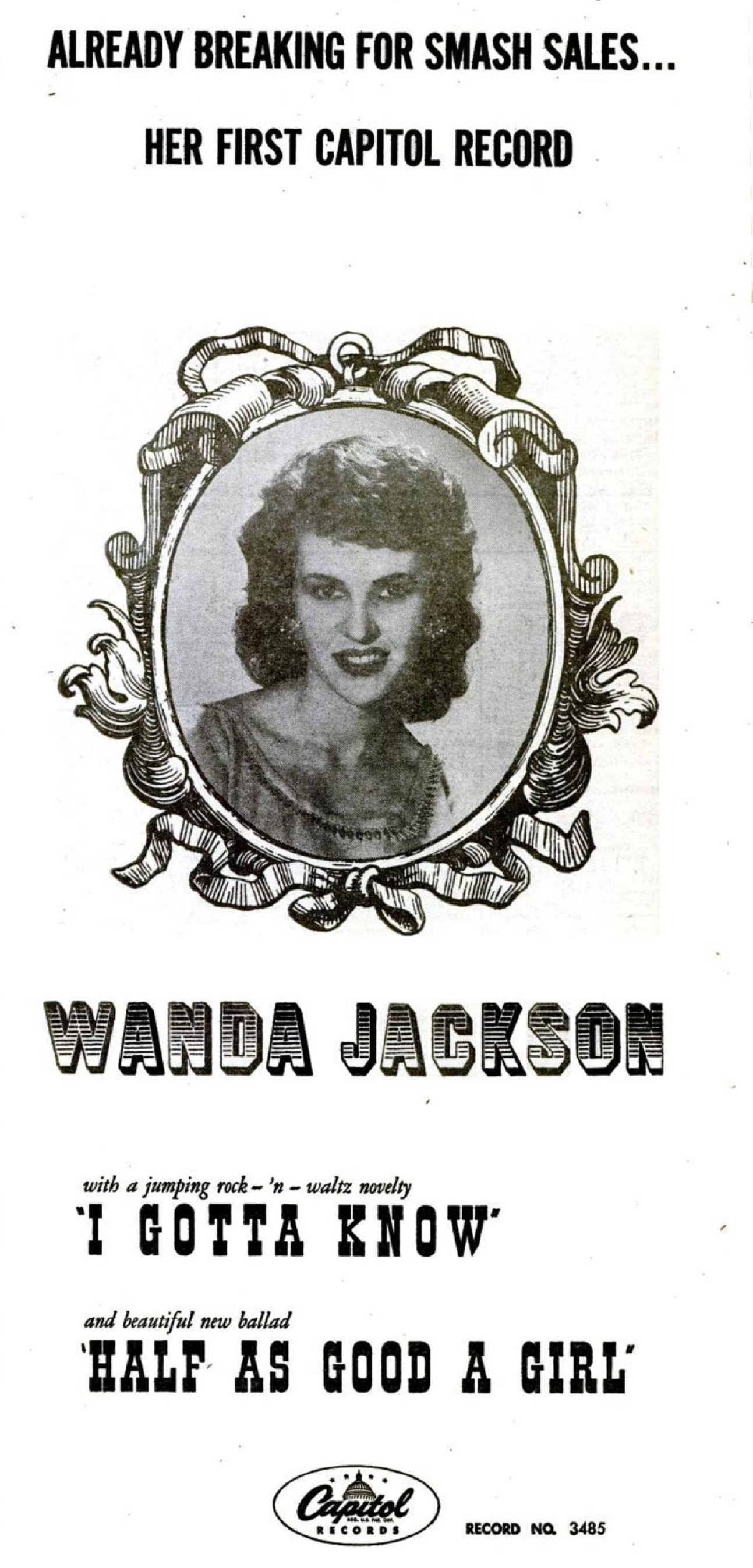
Billboard advertisement, July 21, 1956

In 1956, Decca Records released Jackson from her contract. With Hank Thompson's help, she secured a new contract with Capitol Records the same year. At her first Capitol recording session, Jackson cut two country songs and one rock-and-roll selection. One song, "I Gotta Know", incorporated elements of both country and rock. According to Jackson, the song's mixture of rock allowed her to get acquainted with the genre. Released as a single in 1956, "I Gotta Know" became Jackson's second commercially successful release, peaking at number 15 on the U.S. country chart. Jackson continued recording rock and roll under her Capitol contract and was given full permission to do so by producer Ken Nelson. Jackson also composed several of her Capitol recordings, including "Baby Loves Him", "Cool Love", and "Mean Mean Man". She continued recording country music, as well, often putting each style on either side of a single release.

Writers and critics have remarked positively about Jackson's recordings from the 1950s and noted their take on women's sexuality. Mary A. Bufwack and Robert K. Oermann described songs like "Baby Loves Him" as "rockabilly classics". In addition, they commented that Jackson's rock records were "sexually aggressive" and demonstrated "almost frightening savagery". Bruce Eder added that Jackson's material was at times "astonishingly raucous and even raunchy". Meanwhile, Kurt Wolff found that Jackson's rock material was also mixed with traditional country elements, which added to her musical individuality: "Jackson mixed straight country material and hot-to-the-core rockabilly numbers almost right from the beginning...Songs like 'Fujiyama Mama' and 'Mean Mean Man' were hard and fast, giving her plenty of reason to shimmy around in her glamorous fringe dresses".

In 1957, Jackson began working under a new booking agent, who arranged several tours in 1957 and 1958. Fellow performers included Johnny Cash, Jerry Lee Lewis, and Carl Perkins. With her new management, Jackson was making more money, sometimes as much as $500 per gig. Meanwhile, her follow-up singles proved unsuccessful in the U.S. According to Jackson, Capitol was unsure how to market her. "Capitol was still trying to figure out what to do with me, but they maintained faith that I could have strong potential in the teen market," she recalled in 2017. To promote her material, the label chose to release Jackson's eponymous debut album in 1958. The record mixed both rock and country selections. Included were her covers of the rock songs "Money Honey" and "Long Tall Sally". Also included were the country songs "Heartbreak Ahead" and "Making Believe". Produced by Ken Nelson, it was released on Capitol in July 1958 with six tracks on either side of the record.

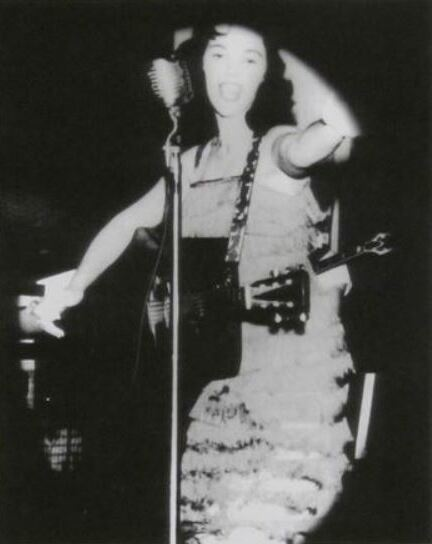
Jackson onstage, 1958

Also in 1958, Jackson saw success overseas with the rock-and-roll single, "Fujiyama Mama". Ken Nelson was reluctant to release the song, with its references to the Hiroshima and Nagasaki bombings. Yet, the disc found commercial appeal with Japanese fans, reaching number one on the nation's music chart. The song's success led Jackson to a Japanese tour in 1959. She played venues in major cities, including Tokyo and Okinawa. Upon her return to America, Jackson played in Las Vegas with Bob Wills and did additional concerts with her newly formed touring band. At different times, the band lineup included Roy Clark and black pianist Big Al Downing. She recalled touring alongside Downing, who was sometimes denied entrance into venues because of his race. In response, Jackson would refuse to work a show unless Downing performed with her. "Look, he's part of our band. If he's not welcome, then none of us are," she once told a club owner.

In 1960, Jackson's album cover of "Let's Have a Party" was discovered by an Iowa disc jockey, which led to an increased interest in it by radio listeners. Upon the encouragement of Capitol Records, "Let's Have a Party" was issued as a single the same year. By July 1960, it had reached number 37 on the US Hot 100. It also found commercial success in Australia and the United Kingdom. The success of "Let's Have a Party" led to Jackson to rename her band "the Party Timers" and prompted her label to release the compilation, Rockin' with Wanda (1960). The album included her previously recorded rock songs from the 1950s. It was later reviewed positively by AllMusic, which gave it four and a half stars.

Her third studio album for Capitol, as noted, came along in early 1961, titled There's a Party Goin' On, which included more rock-and-roll material. Richie Unterberger of AllMusic described the LP as a "pretty solid and energetic set" despite not having "most of Wanda's best rockabilly sides".

=== 1961–1971: New languages and return to country music ===
In the early 1960s, old-school rock-and-roll musicians lost favor as the "Big Beat" of the British Invasion grew in popularity. Feeling pressure from Capitol, Ken Nelson met with Jackson to discuss into which genre she should fit. Because she had her greatest commercial success with country music, they ultimately decided to invest Jackson there. "I wanted to record whatever I wanted to record, but I also understood that Capitol Records had made an investment in me," she recalled in her book. In 1961, Jackson returned with the self-penned track "Right or Wrong". She initially intended to pitch it to Brenda Lee, but Nelson believed Jackson could have success with her own version. The single climbed to number nine on the US country chart, the top 30 of the U.S. Hot 100 and number nine on the US adult contemporary survey. An album of the same name followed in 1961 that split country selections on "side A" and rockabilly selections on "side B". Her next single release, "In the Middle of a Heartache", was also a top-10 hit, reaching number six on the same country chart and number 27 on the Hot 100.

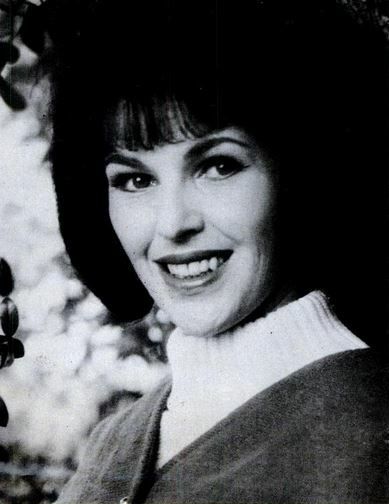
Jackson in a trade ad for Billboard magazine for her country album Reckless Love Affair, 1967

In August 1962, Jackson's fourth studio album was released titled Wonderful Wanda. The album included "In the Middle of a Heartache", along with the country-pop crossover tunes "If I Cried Every Time You Hurt Me" and "A Little Bitty Tear". The latter single had been released following Burl Ives's version, which became more commercially successful than hers. Wonderful Wanda received a positive review from critics, including Billboard magazine, which described her vocal performance as being "in fine form". Jackson and the Party Timers then toured the Southwestern United States for a series of one-night concert engagements. Now newly married, husband Wendell Goodman quit his job with IBM to become her full-time manager in 1962. Capitol continued releasing further country-flavored recordings by Jackson. In 1963, the label issued a Nashville Sound-inspired album of pop covers called Love Me Forever. It was followed in 1964 by her sixth studio album titled Two Sides of Wanda, which was another split disc of rockabilly and country selections.

In 1965, Jackson partnered with Capitol's German record distributor named Electrola Records. The label arranged for her to record music in the German language because her singing voice was "very pleasing to the German ear". That year, she flew to Cologne, Germany, where she cut several selections in German. Material was written especially for Jackson and she was coached through singing in German with the help of a vocal instructor. Following the sessions, Capitol released "Santo Domingo" as a single to the German market in 1965. The song became her first number-one single in her career, climbing to the top of the Austrian pop chart and the top five of the German pop list. In Germany and Austria, Jackson had several more charting songs, including the top-10 "Doch dann kam Johnny". Jackson's foreign-language success led to several European tours during the 1960s, including a package show with Roy Orbison. Upon her return to the United States, Jackson recorded for Capitol Records in Dutch and Japanese.

In the U.S., Jackson became increasingly identified with the country genre as the 1960s progressed. Between 1965 and 1967, she hosted her own syndicated country television program titled Music Village. In 1965, Blues in My Heart became her first album to reach the U.S. country albums chart. In 1966, Jackson had her first U.S. country hit in several years with the top-20 tune "The Box It Came In". It was followed by the number-11 chart single, "Tears Will Be the Chaser for Your Wine". They were issued on her 10th studio album titled Reckless Love Affair (1967). The album became her third chart entry on the U.S. country albums list, peaking at number 17. Jackson had 11 more charting U.S. country songs during the 1960s, including the top-40 hits "A Girl Don't Have to Drink to Have Fun", "Both Sides of the Line", "My Baby Walked Right Out on Me", and "Two Separate Bar Stools". In 1969, "My Big Iron Skillet", reached the top 20 there. Her other singles, including an answer song to Glen Campbell's "By the Time I Get to Phoenix" titled "By the Time You Get to Phoenix", made the U.S. country top 50. Her three studio albums, You'll Always Have My Love (1967), Cream of the Crop (1968), and The Many Moods of Wanda Jackson (1968) made the Billboard country LPs list.

Jackson's country recordings also received attention from music critics and journalists. Billboard described a 1965 studio album as both "poetic and tearful". Mary A. Bufwack and Robert K. Oermann gave the music a mixed review in their 2003 book: "Of Wanda's many country hits between 1961 and 1972, none recaptured her rockabilly zing, although several were self-assertive about women's issues." Meanwhile, Kurt Wolff described her mid-1960s singles as "deeply bitter and vengeful", while also having "genuine honky-tonk emotion". In reviewing a 2006 country compilation album, AllMusic's Thom Jurek found Jackson to be "a solid, original country singer".

In 1969, Jackson recorded her first live record in Phoenix, Arizona, titled Wanda Jackson in Person. Following the album, Capitol Records started replacing Ken Nelson with different producers to record Jackson. This included a two-album stint with producer George Richey, which ended in creative differences, according to Jackson. Richey and Jackson's recordings led to her next major hit called "A Woman Lives for Love" (1970). The single reached number 17 on the U.S. country chart. In 1971, Jackson was assigned Larry Butler to produce her next studio album titled I've Gotta Sing. The project made the top 20 on the U.S. country LPs list, and was her first charting album since 1968. It also featured the single, "Fancy Satin Pillows", which made it to number 13 on the country survey.

=== 1972–1983: Gospel and Christian music transition ===
In the early 1970s, Jackson and her husband became born-again Christians. The shift in her personal life prompted Jackson to concentrate more on gospel music. "Wendell and I both felt like God was calling us to stop working in nightclubs and bars in order to dedicate ourselves to the ministry," her autobiography recounted. Jackson's husband started removing her concerts from the country music nightclub circuit (which accounted for 80% of her income). She also began giving her testimony on stage, and played various tent-show revivals. In 1972, Capitol released her first gospel studio project called Praise the Lord. The LP featured vocal harmonies from the Oak Ridge Boys and included Jackson's first self-penned track. The record was well received by Billboard, which called it "a beautiful spiritual album".

To fulfill her obligations with Capitol, Jackson continued releasing country LPs. In 1972, the company released I Wouldn't Want You Any Other Way, a 10-track collection of traditional country songs. It included the top-40 country selections, "Back Then" and "I Already Know (What I'm Getting for My Birthday)". In her next studio sessions, Jackson asked Ken Nelson to record another gospel record, which he did not support. At the same time, Word Records offered a contract that would allow her the freedom to record more spiritual material. Knowing she was unhappy, Nelson allowed Jackson to accept Word's offer, and she was released from her Capitol contract. Capitol released her last studio album in 1973 titled Country Keepsakes. The disc peaked at number 43 on the country chart.

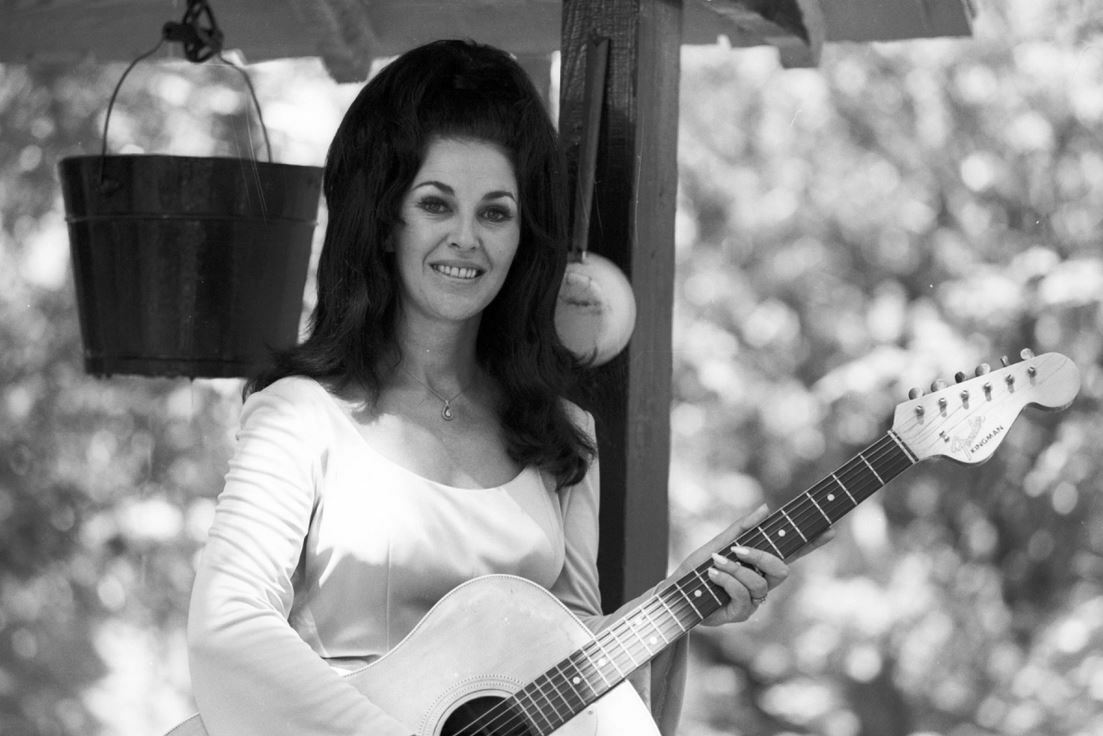
Jackson in 1975

Jackson's signing with Word allowed her also to record with their imprint label Myrrh Records. In her autobiography, Jackson explained that Word issued her gospel records while Myrrh issued her country records. In 1973, Word distributed her second gospel album titled Country Gospel. The project featured covers of the hymn "Farther Along" and Kris Kristofferson's Christian tune "Why Me, Lord". In 1974, Myrrh released the country record When It's Time to Fall in Love Again. Spawned from the album was the single, "Come on Home (To This Lonely Heart)". Billboard described it as "a beautiful love song" that hinted at her Christian "inner spirits". The single was Jackson's last to chart, peaking at number 98 on the U.S. country survey. Jackson later claimed that Word lost interest in her country recordings after being bought out by Dot Records. She was then left to only record gospel. "I was stuck, once again, being pigeonholed," Jackson commented in her book.

Word and Myrrh released three more studio gospel albums by Jackson during the decade: Now I Have Everything (1975), Make Me Like a Child Again (1976), and Closer to Jesus (1977) Reflecting on the LPs in her autobiography, Jackson commented that none of them was "particularly memorable" to her. In 1979, her contract with the labels ended. In need of a change, the Jackson family temporarily moved to Texas, where she became a stay-at-home mother. Yet, the family was unhappy with the move. In 1980, they relocated to Oklahoma City, where they built a house and she continued her entertainment career. The same year, she released a new country disc on the UK-based Deep Sea Music company titled Good Times. The album spawned one single, a cover of Melba Montgomery's "Don't Let the Good Times Fool You". In 1982, K-tel released a studio album of re-recordings titled Let's Have a Party. With limited commercial attention to her music, Jackson felt professionally stuck. "I wasn't even fifty yet, but I felt like I'd been forced into an early retirement as time had passed me by," she recalled in her 2017 book.

=== 1984–2006: Rock-and-roll revival ===
In the mid-1980s, rockabilly music increased in popularity in Europe, as did rock and roll. Jackson's Capitol rock recordings received interest from European fans, and she was soon sought out by overseas promoters. Jackson and her husband saw the opportunity as a message from God. "Wendell and I both realized that God was going to use our testimony in places that needed it", her autobiography explained. In 1984, her husband received a phone call from Swedish businessman, Harry Holmes, who was interested in recording her. Jackson then traveled to Scandinavia to record her first album of rock material in two decades. In 1984, Tab Records released Rockabilly Fever. The album was later released in the U.S. as Rock 'n' Roll Away Your Blues. The project featured covers of rockabilly numbers like "Stupid Cupid" and "It's Only Make Believe". The album received a three-star rating from Allmusic, while writers Mary Bufwack and Robert Oermann positively described it as "rockabilly fire".

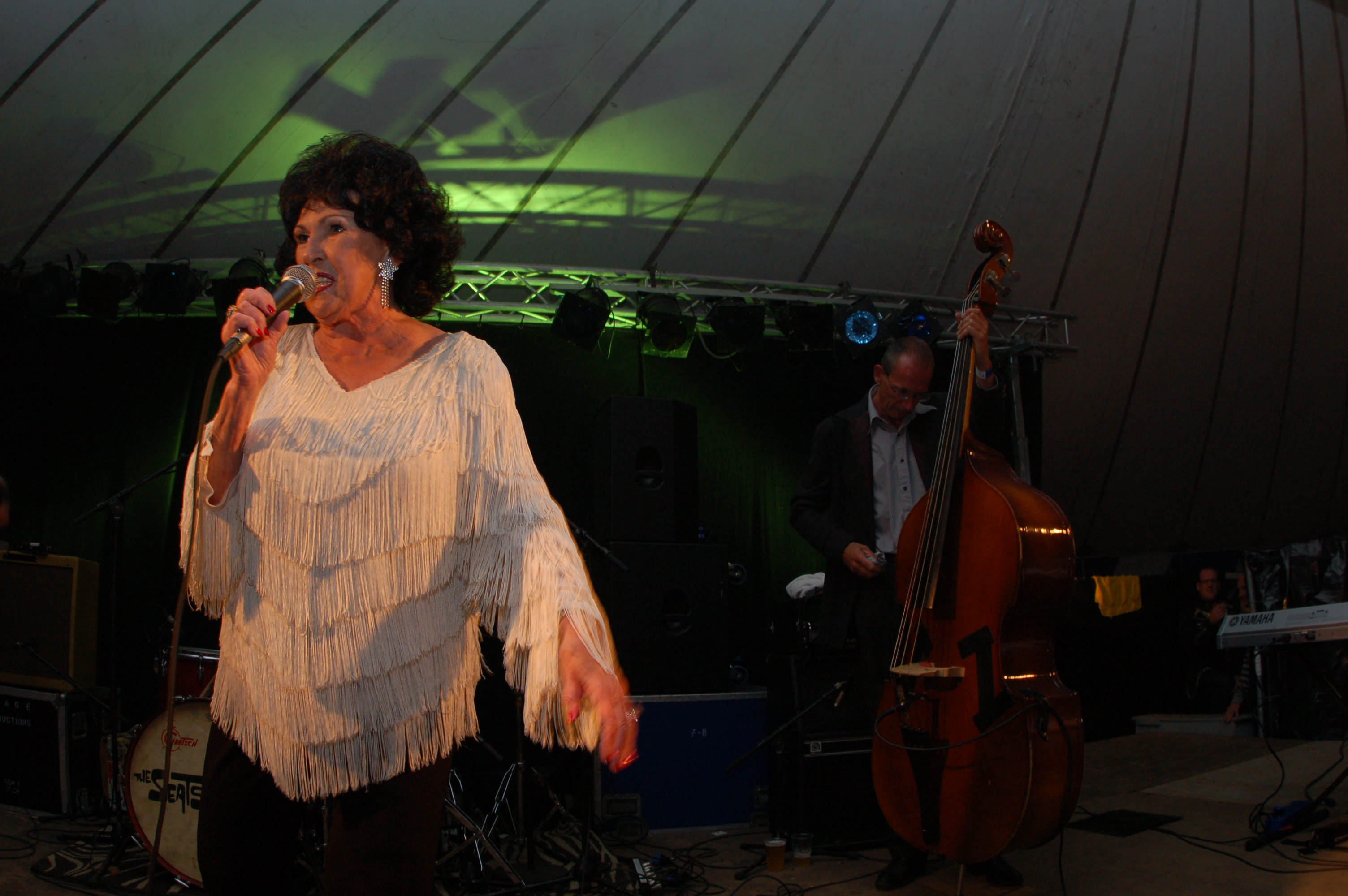
Jackson's rock-and-roll music saw a revival in Europe, where she performed at many festivals, such as the Sjock Festival in Belgium, 2008.

Jackson frequently toured Europe during this period and sang her 1950s rockabilly records. Many of the songs she performed had not been in her regular stage show for years. She recalled having to relearn the lyrics to songs like "Mean Mean Man" after getting hundreds of requests. As the decade progressed, she found opportunities touring in various European countries, including Spain, Switzerland, Hungary, the Czech Republic, and the United Kingdom. Continued interest in her rock music led to further album releases, including 1988's Let's Have a Party in Prague. The album was a collaborative studio LP with Czech performer Karel Zich released on the Supraphon label. She also continued releasing gospel material, such as Show Me the Way to Calvary (1981) on the Christian World label and Teach Me to Love (1984) on Vine Records. She also issued new collections of country recordings, such as Classy Country on Amethyst Records (1988).

In the 1990s, Jackson was informed of rockabilly's resurgence in the U.S. by country artist Rosie Flores. The two visited at Jackson's home, where Flores played several rockabilly records and informed her the growing American fan base. A friendship developed between the two performers and Jackson later appeared on Flores's album Rockabilly Filly (1995). Following the album's release, the pair embarked on a five-week North American tour. Jackson was surprised to find that her audience was young, and the venues were at times uncomfortable: "It was kind of eye-opening. Even though the rooms were a little frightening, the audiences couldn't have been sweeter," she stated. In the mid 1990s, Jackson also collaborated with The Alligators for studio releases on the Success and Elap labels: Let's Have a Party (1995) and The Queen of Rock' a 'Billy (1997).

In 2001, Jackson played at the Rockabilly Festival in Jackson, Tennessee, alongside the Cadillac Angels. In October 2003, CMH Records released her first American rock album in several decades titled Heart Trouble. She recalled in her autobiography that the project was originally intended to be a bluegrass collection. After word spread that Jackson would record an album, several rock musicians contacted the label about joining the production. Musicians who collaborated on the CD included Rosie Flores, the Cramps, and Elvis Costello. AllMusic's Thom Jurek praised the disc in his review: "Simply put, this is a rock-and-roll dream, full of raw, sharp performances, killer songs, and Jackson's irrepressible ability to take even the most innocent song and make it salacious." Charlotte Robinson of PopMatters called the album a "triumphant return", despite the fact that it "uses the same gimmicks as lesser 'comeback' albums."

In January 2006, Goldenlane Records issued Jackson's 43rd studio album, titled I Remember Elvis. The disc was dedicated to Elvis Presley, to whom she paid tribute in the liner notes: "Without the encouragement of Elvis, I may have never recorded rock and roll. So this tribute is just my way of saying thank you to a dear friend." The project received a positive response from Mark Deming of AllMusic, who wrote, "I Remember Elvis is something short of revelatory, but it is a sincere and loving tribute to an influential artist from someone who learned from him first-hand. Slant Magazine gave the collection a three-star rating and praised Jackson's vocals while noting that the arrangements lacked distinction from Presley's originals.

=== 2007–2021: Collaborations and retirement ===
Jackson continued a busy touring schedule in the late 2000s. This included several performances in London and a popular gig in Santa Barbara, California. She also collaborated with Jerry Lee Lewis and Linda Gail Lewis for performances at the London Forum during this time. Following her 2009 induction into the Rock and Roll Hall of Fame, Jackson was approached by rock musician Jack White to record her next album. The pair exchanged song ideas virtually and met for the first time in 2010 to record the album. Jackson did not think she would "see eye-to-eye" with White, who was used to recording "contemporary rock-style music". She eventually became more trusting after getting to know him better. "It was clear that Jack was for me in every way, and I felt honored by the respect he showed me," Jackson recalled in her autobiography. White had Jackson record several songs he selected, including Little Richard's "Rip It Up" and Amy Winehouse's "You Know I'm No Good". White also contacted Bob Dylan, who requested she record his original "Thunder on the Mountain". Jackson agreed and cut the tracks, along with several others for the project.

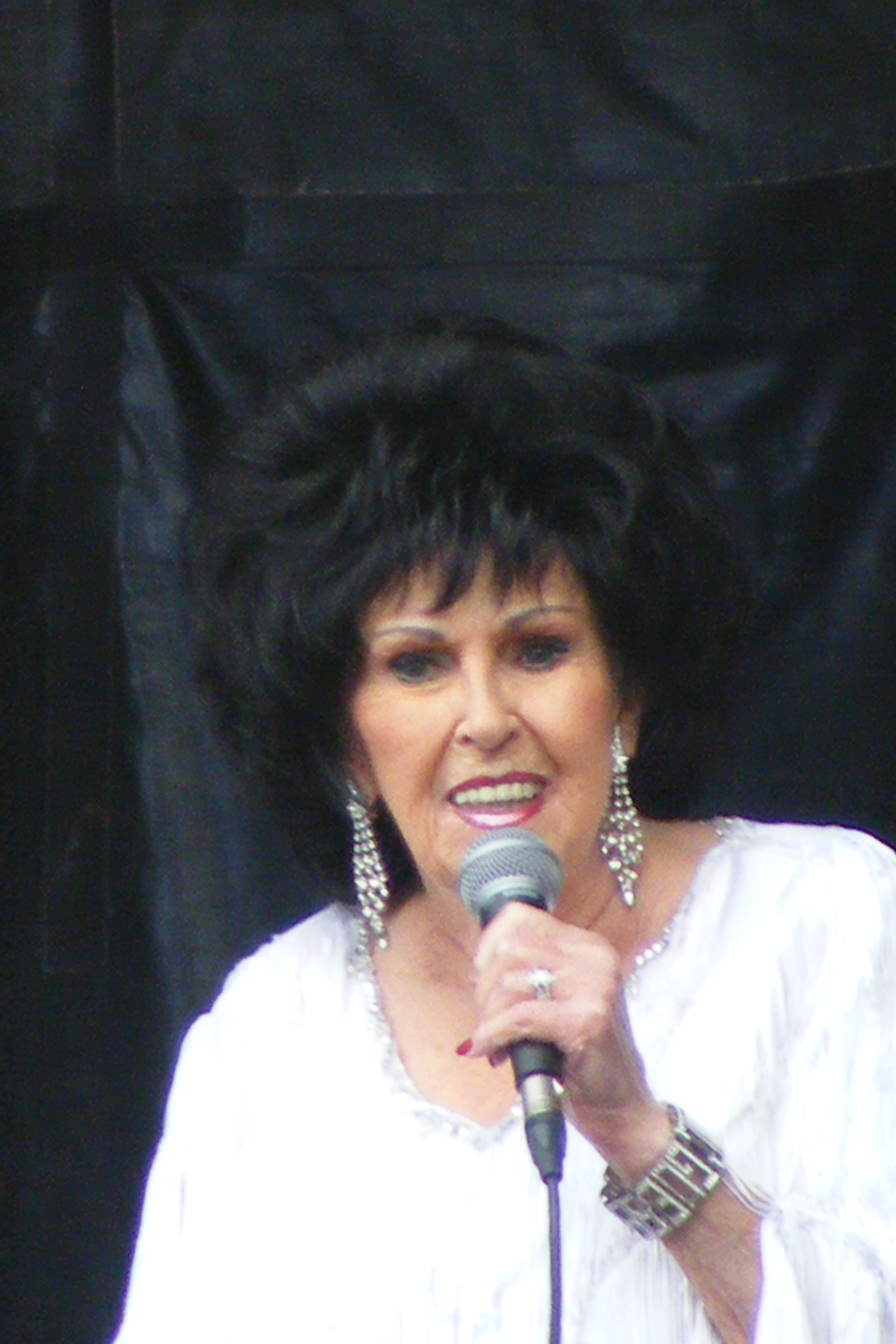
Jackson onstage in 2014: She continued performing until her retirement in 2019.

In January 2011, her 42nd album was released, titled The Party Ain't Over. The rock collection was released on Jack White's record label named Third Man Records. It became Jackson's first album to chart the Billboard 200 all-genre list, peaking at number 58. It also became her first disc to make the Billboard Top Rock Albums chart, where it climbed to number 17. The record received a three-star rating from Allmusic's Stephen Thomas Erlewine, who argued that White's influence overshadowed Jackson's musical image. Erlewine did praise Jackson's vocals and found several tracks that felt like "they belong to her". Rolling Stone's Jon Dolan gave the album three and half stars and called the track listing "superb". "Jackson’s not content to just remake the greats: Her slaying of Amy Winehouse's 'You Know I’m No Good' is a master class for her wild-child inheritors", Dolan concluded. In her autobiography, Jackson recalled making several television appearances to promote the disc. This included performances on the Late Show with David Letterman and Conan. She also recalled taking the stage for the first time in decades at the Grand Ole Opry.

Jackson did not think she could record an album better than her 2011 release. She was encouraged to return to the studio and collaborate with singer-songwriter Justin Townes Earle. In her autobiography, Jackson reflected that her voice was "not in top form" during the album's recording. She blamed a long concert schedule for her vocal quality. In October 2012, Sugar Hill Records released the project titled Unfinished Business. It included liner notes written by Stephen King. The CD peaked at number 61 on the Billboard Top Country Albums chart in 2012, becoming her first disc in 39 years to reach a peak position there. Mark Deming of AllMusic gave the project a positive response in his review: "Unfinished Business shows that six decades after her first recordings, that strategy still works, and she can still deliver the goods without a lot of needless fuss." Greg Kot of the Chicago Tribune found the album was better-suited to Jackson's musical roots compared to previous release, praising her vocal quality and Earle's production.

In 2017, Jackson's autobiography titled Every Night is Saturday Night: A Country Girl's Journey to the Rock and Roll Hall of Fame was published. Co-written by Jackson and Scott Bomar, it was published by BMG Music and featured a foreword by Elvis Costello. According to an interview, Jackson had attempted an autobiography, but found the writing "didn't come out well". Working with Bomar made Jackson feel more comfortable with writing a book. The launch was honored by a party, signing, and performance at the Grammy Museum.

Jackson played a handful of 2018 shows before announcing her retirement in March 2019. She told Rolling Stone that a previously undisclosed stroke was partially to blame, along with additional "health and safety concerns". In August 2021, Big Machine Records and Blackheart Records issued her next studio record titled Encore. The disc was produced by Joan Jett, who is featured performing on the record, along with Elle King and Angaleena Presley. Jackson announced that the project would be her last album. Encore featured songs co-written by Nashville songwriters including Will Hoge and Lori McKenna. It received a positive review from Mark Deming of AllMusic, who gave it three and a half stars: "Clocking in at a very 1950s 25 minutes, Encore doesn't feel like a major event and it doesn't add a great deal to the Wanda Jackson story, but it's a welcome reminder that the first truly great female rocker is still among us and hasn't surrendered to time," he concluded. American Songwriter commented that Jackson "sets the standard, and even in her seventh decade of making music, that confidence and control remain readily apparent."

== Artistry ==
=== Musical styles and voice ===
Jackson's musical style includes rockabilly, country and gospel music. In her early career, she was known for releasing country and rock records simultaneously. Music writers and critics have analyzed the reasoning behind this decision. Critic Bruce Eder explained, "she spent years walking a tightrope between traditional country and rock and roll, just trying to carve out a niche for herself and earn a living". Author Kurt Wolff wrote that Jackson released both genres simultaneously because she "never [felt] the need to hide one set of songs from fans of the other." Critic William Ruhlmann theorized that Jackson "was encouraged to straddle musical genres" due to her record label's worries that rock would decline in popularity.

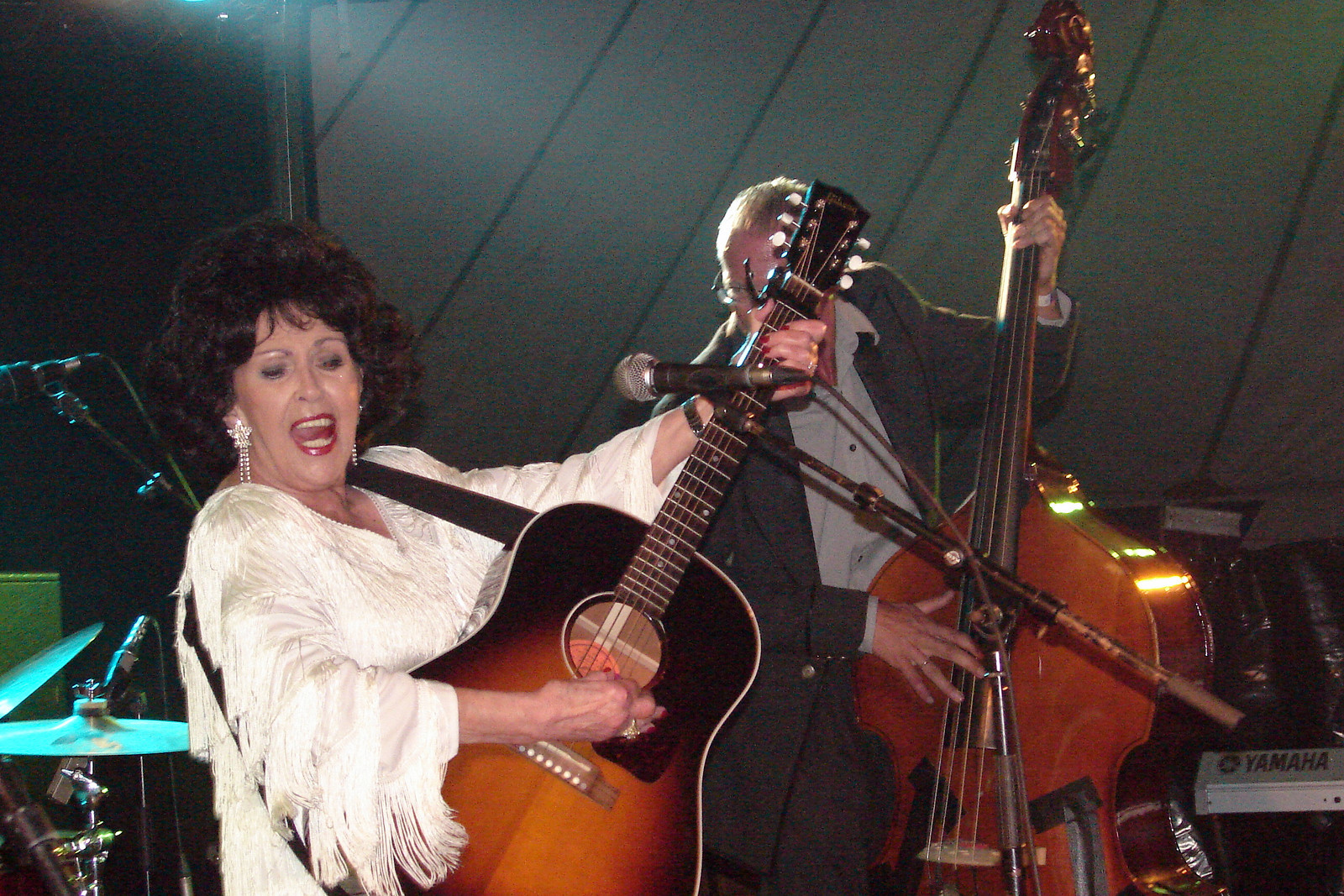
Jackson in concert, 2008.

Her characteristic vocal growl has also been a subject of discussion among writers, critics, and historians. Mary A. Bufwack and Robert K. Oermann stated that Jackson's vocal growl "captured the elemental, low-class wildness of this music [rock and roll] better than any female of her day." NPR's Maria Sherman claimed that Jackson's snarl changed the way audiences view female singers and performers. Stephen L. Betts of Rolling Stone commented that Jackson's vocal snarl gave her a "one-of-a-kind voice like spring-loaded dynamite wrapped in sandpaper." Jackson's singing growl led to one journalist dubbing her as "a really sweet lady – with a nasty voice." In 2023, Rolling Stone ranked Jackson at number 149 on its list of the 200 Greatest Singers of All Time.

Jackson is also known for being able to yodel. Several selections in her catalog feature yodeling, including 1969's "Cowboy Yodel" and 1975's "Jesus Put a Yodel in My Soul". "I always yodelled. People just loved yodelling," she told the BBC.

=== Performance style and image ===
Jackson's choice of stage wear and movement on stage has also been a subject of discussion. Unlike other female country performers, Jackson chose to dress in gold lamé outfits and sequined dresses, most of which were designed by her mother. "I was the first one to put some glamour in the country music," she explained to the Rockabilly Hall of Fame. Mary A. Bufwack and Robert K. Oermann added that Jackson's outfits demonstrated "fire, energy, and uninhibited nerve that doubtless shocked conservatives". The way Jackson moved on stage has also been seen as uncharacteristic of other female performers. Bobby Moore added that Jackson's live shows embedded "upbeat songs" and "high energy" that "compelled audience members to party like they don't have to work the next day." In the same interview, she explained her reasoning for putting on a high-energy performance show: "I feel like it's my job to see that people have a good time when they come out to a concert."

=== Influence ===
Jackson has been referred to as "the Queen of Rockabilly" due to her being one of the early female performers in the rock genre. She has also been considered among the first women to have a life-long career in country music. Her career has influenced a series of performers in both the country and rock fields. Pam Tillis is among several country artists who regard Jackson as an influence. To honor her, Tillis included Jackson on her 1995 TNN concert series hosted at the Ryman Auditorium. Rosie Flores has also cited Jackson as an influence on her music and career. Flores spoke of how Jackson influenced her career in a 2012 interview with the Chicago Tribune: "The main thing I learned was that the older you get, the music you do and the way you put it out doesn't change. You don't have to slow down. You can keep rocking. There is no age when it comes to rock 'n' roll." Jann Browne has also cited Jackson as a musical inspiration. She included Jackson on her 1990 studio album titled Tell Me Why. Miranda Lambert also found Jackson to be an influence on her career: "Here was the woman who in so many ways, changed the way audiences and record labels viewed female artists. She literally helped to pave the way for me to do what I love each and every day."

In rock music, several artists have also named Jackson an artistic influence. Bruce Springsteen and Elvis Costello paid tribute to Jackson in her 2008 documentary centered on her life and career. Cyndi Lauper cited her as one of the earliest influences on her career, recording "Funnel of Love" for her 2016 album Detour. "I think for country you look at Patsy Cline or Loretta Lynn who played a guitar, or sang the songs she wrote, and Dolly Parton. But Wanda Jackson was a rocker, and so, of course, I was going to listen and learn from her because I was a rocker and that's what we did." Adele explained that a "greatest hits" package by Jackson helped influence her 2008 studio album, 19. Elle King also named Jackson as an influence on her music in 2016.

== Recognition and legacy ==
Jackson was twice nominated for Grammy Awards. Her 1964 album, Two Sides of Wanda, was nominated for Best Female Country Vocal Performance. In 1970, "A Woman Lives for Love" was nominated for the same. Her recording of "Let's Have a Party" was inducted into the Grammy Hall of Fame in 2024.

Jackson's work got more recognition several decades later when she received the Fellowship Award from the National Endowment for the Arts. She became the first female country and rock performer to receive the accolade.

During this period, various rock musicians began advocating for Jackson to be inducted into the Rock and Roll Hall of Fame. In 2005, Elvis Costello wrote a letter to the organization about why she should be inducted. Cyndi Lauper and Bruce Springsteen also advocated for her. In 2005, she was nominated by the organization. In 2009, Jackson was officially inducted into the Rock and Roll Hall of Fame under the category "Early Influence". She was presented with the induction by singer-songwriter Rosanne Cash.

Jackson was also inducted into the Rockabilly Hall of Fame, the Iowa Rock and Roll Hall of Fame, the Oklahoma Hall of Fame and the Oklahoma Country Music Hall of Fame. On an international level, she has been inducted into the International Gospel Hall of Fame and the German Country Music Hall of Fame.

In 2009, Oklahoma City named an alley for Jackson in the Bricktown entertainment district. Jackson's hometown of Maud also named one of their streets after her. In 2010, John Mellencamp and she were recipients of the Lifetime Achievement award from the Americana Music Honors. In 2016, she was the recipient of the Founder of the Sound award at the Ameripolitan Music Awards.

In 2002, she was included on CMT's televised special of the 40 Great Women in Country Music. In 2006, Alfred Publishing acknowledged her influence on young musicians by publishing The Best of Wanda Jackson: Let's Have a Party, a songbook with music and lyrics to 13 songs associated with Jackson. In 2008, the Smithsonian Channel released a documentary focused on Jackson's career titled The Sweet Lady with the Nasty Voice. In 2019, Ken Burns profiled her in his televised documentary titled Country Music.

== Personal life ==
=== Relationships and family ===
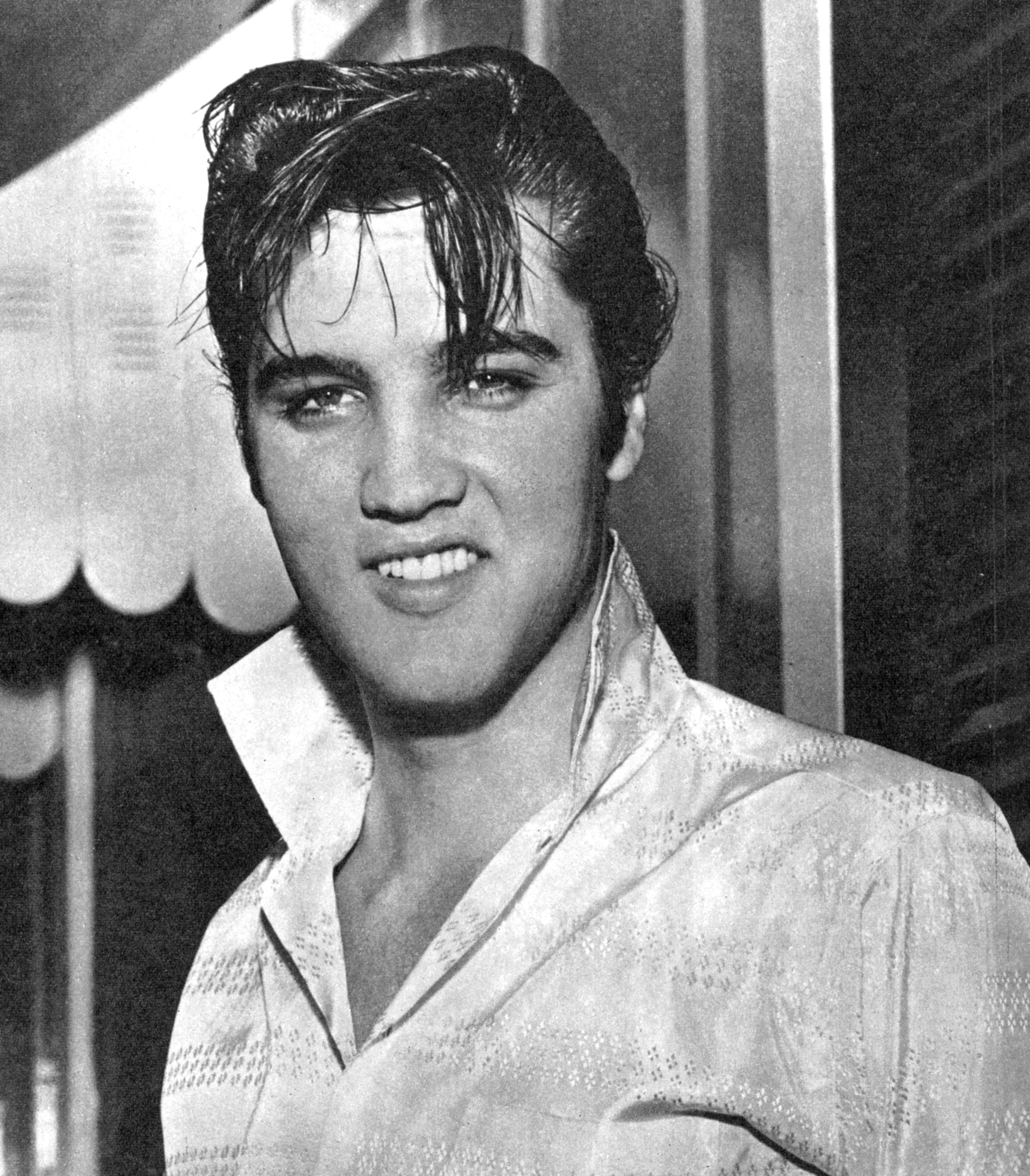
In the mid-1950s, Jackson dated fellow rock-and-roll artist Elvis Presley.

After Jackson spent time touring with Elvis Presley, the pair's relationship became romantic in 1955. He asked her to make the relationship official by giving Jackson a small diamond ring that she wore on a necklace. In her autobiography, she explained that Presley "won my heart as I was just beginning to understand what it really meant to embrace my femininity and express myself as a young woman." According to Jackson, the pair's relationship ended in 1956 once Presley began appearing in films and Colonel Tom Parker took control of his career.

In her teen years, Jackson befriended aspiring country performer Norma Jean. The two often appeared on the Ozark Jubilee television show and socialized frequently. Norma Jean began dating local resident, Wendell Goodman, and Jackson sometimes joined them on dates. In 1961, Norma Jean accepted an offer to become a cast member of The Porter Wagoner Show in Nashville and ended her relationship with Goodman. Jackson and Goodman started dating shortly after their breakup. In her 2017 book, she recalled that she fell in love with him prior to their dating: "When they [Norma Jean and Goodman] had first come into the house and I saw Wendell, that was it. It was love at first sight." The couple married in 1961. Goodman had begun a career in computers with IBM, but left the position to become his wife's full-time business manager. He later oversaw and managed his wife's company named Wanda Jackson Enterprises. In 2017, Goodman died at the age of 81.

The couple had two children together. Their daughter, Gina, was born in 1962, and their son, Greg, was born in 1964. Because Jackson's husband traveled with her, their children were kept home and raised by nannies. Jackson's parents also kept the children on weekends. "I knew it wasn't a normal childhood for them, and I've always carried a little guilt about that," she recalled in 2017.

=== Personal challenges and spirituality ===
"I had a lot to learn, but God was teaching me. We were surrounded by some of the greatest people who came alongside us and shepherded us as we grew in our faith. I felt like, at the age of thirty-three, I was just learning what it really meant to live life to the fullest. He saved our marriage, too, as Wendell and I came together in pursuit of spiritual morality. Our priorities were realigned and we were both filled with an indescribable sense of peace."

— Jackson, in her autobiography

By 1971, Jackson had become increasingly unhappy with her professional and personal life. "I had everything that a person could need or want. But I still couldn't shake that dull but persistent sense of emptiness inside," she later explained. Her husband and she had also developed a problem with alcohol, which led Goodman to become physically and verbally abusive with Jackson. Upon returning from a show, Jackson recalled going to church with her family and having a life-altering experience. "After we got up off our knees, everything was different," she stated in her autobiography. The couple found solace in Christianity and dedicated their personal lives to spirituality in 1971. They were later baptized, and the couple went on to state that faith saved their marriage.

The couple's belief in their faith would lead them to working with evangelists in Dallas, Texas during the late 1970s. Her husband set up an office building in the city that offered resources to various ministries in the local area. As Jackson's rockabilly music revived in the 1980s, the couple decided to invest less professional time with Christianity. "It was hard to feel right about singing in bars again, but God confirmed in my spirit, time and time again, that that's where He wanted me and that's where I could be most effective," she explained in her autobiography.

=== Health problems ===
In the 2010s, Jackson developed pneumonia and was hospitalized for a week. A knee replacement became infected with MRSA and she fell several times in her Oklahoma house, damaging her shoulder. In 2017, her internal bleeding was treated at a hospital in Tijuana, Mexico, that focused on nutritional and medical therapy. A 2018 stroke led her to retire. She said it would have impaired her more if her daughter had brought her to the hospital later. "I was so fortunate", she told The Independent in 2021.

== Discography ==
Studio albums

- Wanda Jackson (1958)
- Rockin' with Wanda (1960)
- There's a Party Goin' On (1961)
- Right or Wrong (1961)
- Wonderful Wanda (1962)
- Love Me Forever (1963)
- Two Sides of Wanda (1964)
- Blues in My Heart (1965)
- Wanda Jackson Sings Country Songs (1965)
- Wanda Jackson Salutes the Country Music Hall of Fame (1966)
- Reckless Love Affair (1967)
- You'll Always Have My Love (1967)
- Cream of the Crop (1968)
- The Many Moods of Wanda Jackson (1968)
- The Happy Side of Wanda (1969)
- Wanda Jackson Country! (1970)
- A Woman Lives for Love (1970)
- I've Gotta Sing (1971)
- Praise the Lord (1972)
- I Wouldn't Want You Any Other Way (1972)
- Country Gospel (1973)
- Country Keepsakes (1973)
- When It's Time to Fall in Love Again (1974)
- Now I Have Everything (1975)
- Make Me Like a Child Again (1976)
- Closer to Jesus (1977)
- Good Times (1980)
- Show Me the Way to Calvary (1981)
- Let's Have a Party (1982)
- My Kind of Gospel (1983)
- Rockabilly Fever (1984)
- Teach Me to Love (1984)
- Let's Have a Party in Prague (with Karel Zich) (1987)
- Classy Country (1988)
- Encore (1988)
- Don't Worry Be Happy (1989)
- Goin' on with My Jesus (1991)
- Rock & Roll-ra Hívlak! (with Dolly Roll) (1992)
- Generations (Of Gospel Music) (1993)
- Let's Have a Party (1995)
- The Queen of Rock' a 'Billy (1997)
- Heart Trouble (2003)
- I Remember Elvis (2006)
- The Party Ain't Over (2011)
- Unfinished Business (2012)
- Encore (2021)

== Filmography ==
Film and television appearances by Wanda Jackson
Title	Year	Role	Notes	Ref.
Music Village	1965–1967	Host		
Welcome to the Club: The Women of Rockabilly	2002	Herself		
The Sweet Lady with the Nasty Voice	2008	Herself		
VH1 Divas Celebrates Soul	2011	Herself	Guest performer	
Country Music	2019	Herself		

== Books ==
- Every Night Is Saturday: A Country Girl's Journey to the Rock & Roll Hall of Fame (with Scott Bomar) (2017)
