= The Box It Came In =

Single by Wanda Jackson

from the album Reckless Love Affair
- B-side: "Look Out Heart"
- Released: January 1966
- Recorded: September 24, 1965; Nashville, Tennessee, U.S.
- Genre: Country
- Length: 2:25
- Label: Capitol
- Songwriter: Vic McAlpin
- Producer: Ken Nelson

Wanda Jackson singles chronology
| "My First Day Without You" (1965) | "The Box It Came In" (1966) | "Because It's You" (1966) |

"The Box It Came In" is a song written by Vic McAlpin (1918–1980) and recorded by American country, rock and roll and Christian music artist Wanda Jackson.

The song was recorded at the Columbia Recording Studio in Nashville on September 24, 1965. "The Box It Came In" was originally released as a single by Capitol Records in January 1966, and peaked at No. 18 on the Billboard Magazine Hot Country Singles chart. The song would be Jackson's first major hit on the country chart since 1961, and the first in a series of charting country singles for her between 1966 and 1971. The song was included on Reckless Love Affair, Jackson's 1966 studio LP, and also appears on several subsequent compilation albums of her recordings.

"The Box It Came In" is spare and direct (one verse, and a repeated bridge and chorus), and is sung from the point of view of a woman who is destitute after her husband abandons her, taking "everything with him that wasn’t nailed down" - including her wedding dress. The song has been described as a murder ballad in which "the murder hasn’t happened … yet", given the last line:

But somewhere I'll find him
then I'll have peace of mind
and the box he comes home in
will be all satin lined.

== Chart performance ==
| Chart (1966) | Peak position |
|---|---|
| U.S. Billboard Hot Country Singles | 18 |
