= Wanda Jackson albums discography =

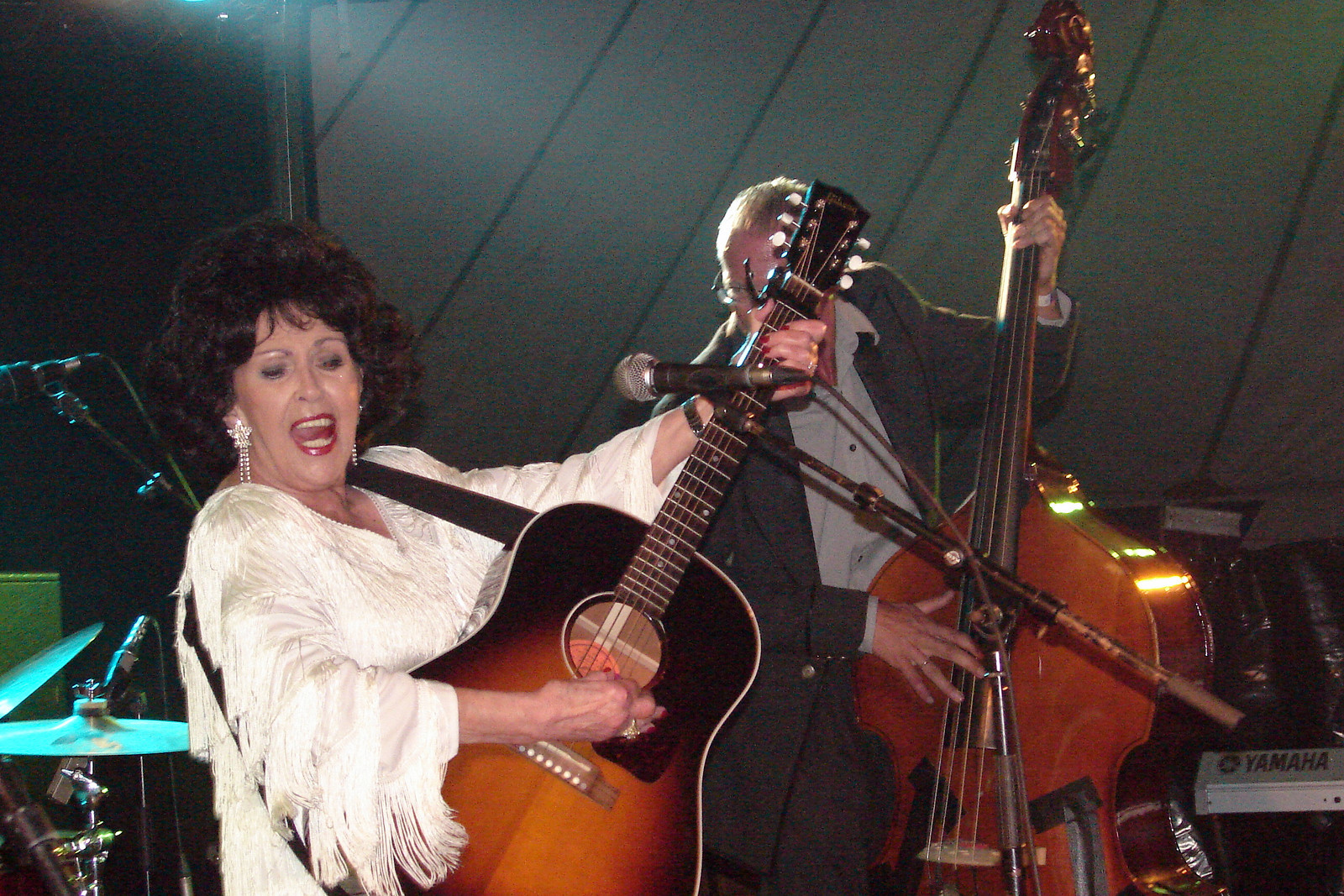
- Wanda Jackson performing at the Sjock Festival in Belgium, 2008
- Studio albums: 44
- Live albums: 4
- Compilation albums: 37
- Video albums: 1
- Box sets: 2
- Other appearances: 28

The albums discography of Wanda Jackson, an American recording artist, consists of 44 studio albums, 37 compilation albums, four live albums, one video album, two box sets and has made 28 album appearances. In 1954 at age sixteen, Jackson signed with Decca Records as a country music artist. The label did not issue a record until the 1962 compilation Lovin' Country Style, six years after Jackson left Decca. She signed with Capitol Records in 1956, and her self-titled debut studio album was released three years later. Although Jackson had recently been identifying herself as a rock-and-roll performer, the album consisted of country music recordings. However, it did contain Jackson's future rock-and-roll hit "Let's Have a Party", which was a hit in 1960, reaching the Top 40 on the Billboard Pop chart. The success of her rock-and-roll recordings led to the release of two more rock-and-roll studio LPs: Rockin' with Wanda (1960) and There's a Party Goin' On (1961). Additionally, Capitol issued two "split" studio albums (Right or Wrong and Two Sides of Wanda) which contained rock and roll on one side and country music on the other.

As rock and roll started declining in the early 1960s, Jackson was remarketed as a country artist. During this transitional period, her album production moved towards country pop and Nashville Sound styles on studio LPs such as Wonderful Wanda (1962) and Love Me Forever (1963). Jackson's 1965 studio album Blues in My Heart was her first to chart on a Billboard Magazine album list, peaking at number nine on the Country LP chart. While recording a tribute album to the Country Music Hall of Fame in 1967, Jackson issued an album of German songs, entitled Made in Germany. While remaining on Capitol Records, various country-marketed studio albums were issued that peaked in the Billboard Top Country Albums chart: Reckless Love Affair (number 17), Cream of the Crop (number 25), The Many Moods of Wanda Jackson (number 28), and I've Gotta Sing (number 19). In 1968, the compilation album The Best of Wanda Jackson reached number 29 on the Top Country Albums chart. Her first live album, Wanda Jackson in Person, was released the following year.

Converting to Christianity in 1971, Jackson released her first religious studio album, Praise the Lord. Deciding to record more religious music, she signed with the Word and Myrrh labels in the mid-1970s. Several albums of gospel hymns were issued, such as Make Me Like a Child Again (1976), I'll Still Love You (1976), and Show Me the Way to Calvary (1981). Additionally, Jackson released several cover records of country recordings, including Good Times (1980), Let's Have a Party (1982), and Classy Country (1988). Around this time, Jackson's rock-and-roll material was revived in Europe, where she launched a tour and issued several rockabilly studio albums, including Rockabilly Fever (1984), recorded in Sweden; a duet album with Karel Zich in 1987; and a live album in 1989. In response, the German-based Bear Family Records issued two box sets of Jackson's rock and country recordings. Jackson continued issuing gospel as well as rock albums into the 1990s. She released a fourth live album in 2000. Her album Heart Trouble (2003) and an album of cover versions of Elvis Presley songs both received critical acclaim. Following her induction into the Rock and Roll Hall of Fame (2009), Jack White (of the White Stripes) produced Jackson's "comeback album", The Party Ain't Over (2011), which brought renewed success to Jackson. The album became her first since 1973 to chart, peaking at number 58 on the Billboard 200 and number 17 on the Top Rock Albums chart. With The Party Ain't Over, Jackson became the oldest female artist to place an album on the Billboard 200 chart, at the age of 73. In October 2012, Justin Townes Earle produced her forty-fifth studio record, Unfinished Business, which reached number 61 on the Top Country Albums chart.

== Studio albums ==
=== 1950s–1960s ===
List of studio albums and selected chart positions, showing other relevant details
Title	Album details	Peak chart positions
Title	Album details	US Country
Wanda Jackson	Released: July 1958; Label: Capitol; Formats: LP	—
There's a Party Goin' On	Released: January 1961; Label: Capitol; Formats: LP	—
Right or Wrong	Released: October 1961; Label: Capitol; Formats: LP	—
Wonderful Wanda	Released: August 1962; Label: Capitol; Formats: LP	—
Love Me Forever	Released: May 1963; Label: Capitol; Formats: LP	—
Two Sides of Wanda	Released: March 1964; Label: Capitol; Formats: LP	—
Blues in My Heart	Released: April 1965; Label: Capitol; Formats: LP	9
Wanda Jackson Sings Country Songs	Released: December 1965; Label: Capitol; Formats: LP	—
Wanda Jackson Salutes the Country Music Hall of Fame	Released: September 1966; Label: Capitol; Formats: LP	12
Reckless Love Affair	Released: March 1967; Label: Capitol; Formats: LP	17
You'll Always Have My Love (with The Party Timers)	Released: September 1967; Label: Capitol; Formats: LP	25
Cream of the Crop (with The Party Timers)	Released: August 1968; Label: Capitol; Formats: LP	25
The Many Moods of Wanda Jackson	Released: December 1968; Label: Capitol; Formats: LP	28
The Happy Side of Wanda	Released: July 1969; Label: Capitol; Formats: LP	—
"—" denotes a recording that did not chart or was not released in that territory.

=== 1970s ===
List of studio albums and selected chart positions, showing other relevant details
Title	Album details	Peak chart positions
Title	Album details	US Country
Wanda Jackson Country!	Released: February 1970; Label: Capitol; Formats: LP	—
A Woman Lives for Love	Released: August 1970; Label: Capitol; Formats: LP	—
I've Gotta Sing	Released: February 1971; Label: Capitol; Formats: LP	19
Praise the Lord	Released: March 1972; Label: Capitol; Formats: LP	—
I Wouldn't Want You Any Other Way	Released: September 1972; Label: Capitol; Formats: LP	—
Country Gospel	Released: January 1973; Label: Word; Formats: LP	—
Country Keepsakes	Released: March 1973; Label: Capitol; Formats: LP	43
When It's Time to Fall in Love Again	Released: 1974; Label: Myrrh; Formats: LP	—
Now I Have Everything	Released: March 1975; Label: Myrrh; Formats: LP	—
Make Me Like a Child Again	Released: March 1976; Label: Myrrh; Formats: LP, cassette	—
Closer to Jesus	Released: 1977; Label: Word; Formats: LP	—
"—" denotes a recording that did not chart or was not released in that territory.

=== 1980s ===
List of studio albums, showing all relevant details
Title	Album details
Good Times	Released: 1980; Label: Deep Sea; Formats: LP
Show Me the Way to Calvary (Note: Show Me the Way to Calvary was later released in the United Kingdom under the name My Testimony.)	Released: 1981; Label: Christian World; Formats: LP
Let's Have a Party (re-recordings)	Released: 1982; Label: K-tel; Formats: LP, cassette
My Kind of Gospel	Released: 1983; Label: Tab/Vine; Formats: LP
Rockabilly Fever (Note: Rockabilly Fever was re-titled in the United States as Rock and Roll Away Your Blues and was released on Warrick Records.)	Released: 1984; Label: Tab; Formats: LP
Teach Me to Love	Released: 1984; Label: Tab; Formats: LP
Let's Have a Party in Prague (with Karel Zich)	Released: 1988; Label: Supraphon; Formats: LP, CD, cassette
Classy Country (re-recordings)	Released: 1988; Label: Amethyst; Formats: Cassette
Encore	Released: 1989; Label: Amethyst; Formats: LP, cassette
Don't Worry Be Happy	Released: 1989; Label: Amethyst; Formats: Cassette

=== 1990s–2000s ===
List of studio albums, showing all relevant details
Title	Album details
Goin' on with My Jesus	Released: 1991; Label: Amethyst; Formats: Cassette
Rock & Roll-ra Hívlak! (with Dolly Roll)	Released: 1992; Label: Proton/Python; Formats: CD, cassette
Generations (Of Gospel Music)	Released: 1993; Label: Amethyst; Formats: Cassette
Let's Have a Party (re-recordings)	Released: 1995; Label: Elap/Success; Formats: CD
The Queen of Rock' a 'Billy	Released: 1997; Label: CB Artists/Elap; Formats: CD
Heart Trouble	Released: October 14, 2003; Label: CMH; Formats: LP, CD
I Remember Elvis	Released: January 31, 2006; Label: Goldenlane; Formats: LP, CD

=== 2010s–2020s ===
List of studio albums and selected chart positions, showing other relevant details
Title	Album details	Peak chart positions		
Title	Album details	US	US Coun.	US Rock
The Party Ain't Over	Released: January 25, 2011; Label: Third Man; Formats: LP, CD, music download	58	—	17
Unfinished Business	Released: October 9, 2012; Label: Sugar Hill; Formats: LP, CD, music download	—	61	—
Encore	Released: August 20, 2021; Label: Big Machine/Blackheart; Formats: CD, music download	—	—	—
"—" denotes a recording that did not chart or was not released in that territory.

== Compilation albums ==
=== 1960s–1980s ===
List of compilation albums, with selected chart positions, showing other relevant details
Title	Album details	Peak chart positions
Title	Album details	US Country
Rockin' with Wanda	Released: May 1960; Label: Capitol Records; Formats: LP	—
Lovin' Country Style	Released: 1962; Label: Decca Records; Formats: LP	—
Made in Germany	Released: 1967; Label: Capitol; Formats: LP	—
The Best of Wanda Jackson	Released: February 1968; Label: Capitol Records; Formats: LP	29
Please Help Me I'm Falling	Released: 1968; Label: Hilltop Records; Formats: LP	—
Nobody's Darlin'	Released: 1968; Label: Vocalion; Formats: LP	—
Leave My Baby Alone	Released: 1969; Label: Hilltop Records; Formats: LP	—
We'll Sing in the Sunshine	Released: 1972; Label: Hilltop Records; Formats: LP	—
Four Sides	Released: 1972; Label: Capitol; Formats: LP	—
By the Time I Get to Phoenix	Released: 1973; Label: Hilltop Records; Formats: LP	—
Wanda Jackson	Released: 1974; Label: Pickwick Records; Formats: LP	—
Stars of Country	Released: 1975; Label: Capitol; Formats: LP	—
I'll Still Love You	Release: 1976; Label: DJM; Formats: LP	—
Rock 'n' Roll Best 20	Released: 1977; Label: Capitol; Formats: LP	—
Her Greatest Country Hits	Released: 1978; Label: Capitol; Formats: LP	—
20 Rock 'n' Roll Hits	Released: 1979; Label: Capitol/EMI; Formats: LP	—
Featuring 16 Country Chart Hits	Released: 1979; Label: Capitol; Formats: LP	—
Wanda Jackson	Released: 1980; Label: Capitol; Formats: LP	—
Early Wanda Jackson	Release date: 1984; Label: Bear Family; Formats: LP	—
Country Love Songs	Released: 1985; Label: Capitol/Wereldsterren; Formats: LP	—
"—" denotes a recording that did not chart or was not released in that territory.

=== 1990s–2010s ===
List of compilation albums, showing all relevant details
Title	Album details
Rockin' in the Country: The Best of Wanda Jackson	Released: June 1990; Label: Rhino; Formats: CD
Greatest Hits	Released: 1990; Label: Curb; Formats: Cassette, CD
Santo Domingo – Hre Deutsche Aufnahmen	Released: 1990; Label: Bear Family; Formats: Cassette, CD
Vintage Collection Series	Released: January 23, 1996; Label: Capitol Nashville; Formats: Cassette, CD
The World Didn't Give It to Me	Released: February 28, 2000; Label: Word; Formats: CD
Queen of Rockabilly	Released: October 17, 2000; Label: Ace; Formats: CD
Wanda Rocks	Released: December 9, 2002; Label: Bear Family Records; Formats: CD
Heartache	Released: February 10, 2004; Label: Varèse Sarabande; Formats: CD
The Very Best of the Country Years	Released: September 19, 2006; Label: Ace Records; Formats: CD
The Ballads of Wanda Jackson	Released: March 5, 2007; Label: Bear Family Records; Formats: CD
The Ultimate Collection	Released: July 2, 2007; Label: EMI; Formats: CD, music download
Let's Have a Party: The Very Best of Wanda Jackson	Released: May 3, 2011; Label: Varèse; Formats: CD, music download
The Complete Decca Recordings	Released: September 4, 2020; Label: MCA; Formats: Music download
The Capitol Singles: 1956–1958	Released: October 23, 2020; Label: EMI; Formats: Music download
The Capitol Singles: 1964–1966	Released: October 23, 2020; Label: EMI; Formats: Music download
The Capitol Singles: 1967–1968	Released: October 23, 2020; Label: EMI; Formats: Music download
The Capitol Singles: 1969–1970	Released: October 23, 2020; Label: EMI; Formats: Music download
The Capitol Singles: 1971–1973	Released: October 23, 2020; Label: EMI; Formats: Music download
The Capitol Singles: 1962–1963	Released: October 30, 2020; Label: EMI; Formats: Music download

== Live albums ==
List of live albums, showing all relevant details
Title	Album details
Wanda Jackson in Person	Released: October 1969; Label: Capitol; Formats: LP
Live in Scandinavia	Released: 1989; Label: Tab; Formats: LP
The Wanda Jackson Show: Live and Still Kickin'	Released: March 25, 2003; Label: DCN; Formats: CD
Wanda Live! at Third Man Records	Released: 2011; Label: Third Man; Formats: LP

== Video albums ==
List of video albums, showing all relevant details
Title	Album details
Live in Chicago	Released: 2012; Label: Wanda Jackson; Formats: DVD

== Box sets ==
List of box sets, showing all relevant details
Title	Album details
Right or Wrong	Released: December 14, 1992; Label: Bear Family; Formats: CD
Tears Will Be the Chaser for Your Wine	Released: September 10, 1997; Label: Bear Family; Formats: CD

== Other appearances ==
List of non-single guest appearances, with other performing artists, showing year released and album name
Title	Year	Other artist(s)	Album	Ref.
"Don't Let the Good Times Fool You"	1982	—N/a	Silk Cut Festival	
"I Forgot More Than You'll Ever Know"	1990	Jann Browne	Tell Me Why	
"Blue Christmas"	1992	Tom Astor	Country Weihnachten mit Tom Astor	
"Stille Nacht, Heilige Nacht"	1992	Tom Astor	Country Weihnachten mit Tom Astor	
"Mean, Mean Man"	1994	Salty Dogs	Unblended	
"Rock 'n' Roll Honey"	1994	Salty Dogs	Unblended	
"His Rockin' Little Angel"	1995	Rosie Flores	Rockabilly Filly	
"Rock Your Baby"	1995	Rosie Flores	Rockabilly Filly	
"Honey Bop"	1996	The Alligators	The History of Rock 'n' Roll	
"Swing Band in Heaven"	1996	—N/a	Stonehorse and Friends – Tribute to Tulsa Music	
"There's Not a Dry Eye in the House"	1997	George and Lucky Riders	Nashville Friends	
"We Got Started on the Wrong Foot"	1997	George and Lucky Riders	Nashville Friends	
"Silent Night"	1997	The Continentals	Merry Christmas Baby	
"Blue Christmas"	1997	The Continentals	Merry Christmas Baby	
"Go Tell It on the Mountain"	1997	The Continentals	Merry Christmas Baby	
"Merry Christmas Baby"	1997	The Continentals	Merry Christmas Baby	
"Saving My Love"	2001	Andy Lee Lang	Duets	
"What Have We Done"	2002	Justin Trevino	The Scene of the Crying	
"What Gives You the Right"	2004	—N/a	Country Gala	
"Let's Have a Party"	2004	—N/a	Country Gala	
"Whose Bed Have Your Boots Been Under?"	2005	—N/a	An All Star Tribute to Shania Twain	
"Ashes of Love"	2005	Norma Jean	The Loneliest Star in Texas	
"Pretty Miss Norma Jean"	2005	Norma Jean	The Loneliest Star in Texas	
"Queen of Hearts"	2006	Leilah Safka	Country Duetts	
"Have You Ever Seen the Rain"	2006	Leilah Safka	Country Duetts	
"Crazy"	2007	Patsy Cline	The Best of Anthology	
"Santo Domingo"	2008	Tom Astor	Alles Klar: Kein Problem! Das Jubilau	
"My Destiny"	2009	The Byrds	The Roots of The Byrds	
