= Wanda Jackson singles discography =

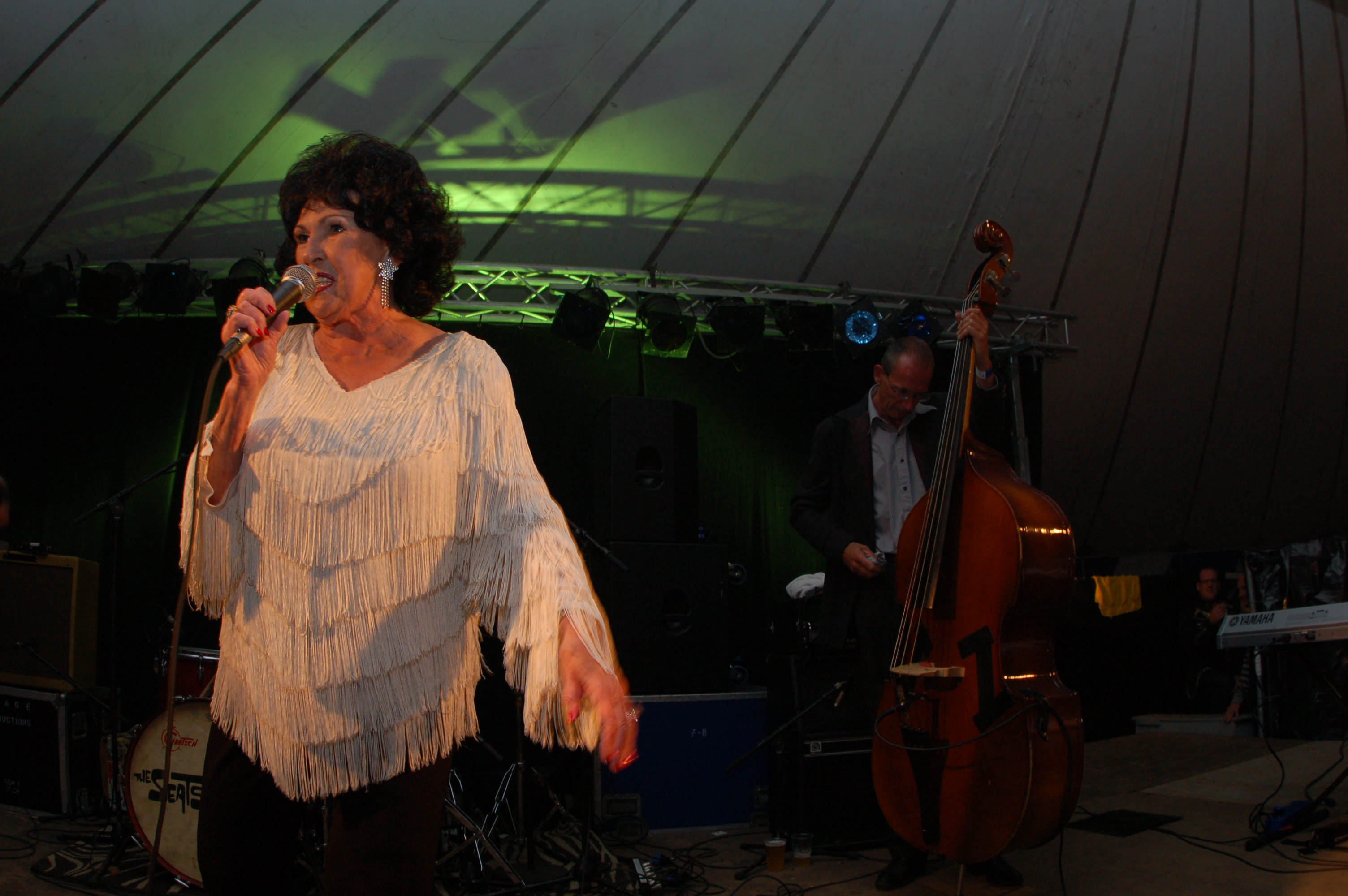
- Wanda Jackson performing at the Sjock Festival in Belgium, July 2008.
- Singles: 80
- Music videos: 3
- International releases: 9
- Other charted songs: 1

The singles discography of Wanda Jackson, an American recording artist, consists of 80 singles, nine international singles, one other charted song, and three music videos. In 1954 at age 16, she signed as a country artist with Decca Records. Her debut single was a duet recording with Billy Gray which reached the eighth spot on the Billboard Hot Country Singles chart, also in 1954. Refusing to tour until completing high school, Jackson's further singles for Decca failed gaining success. She signed with Capitol Records in 1956 and began incorporating rock and roll into her musical style. Jackson's first Capitol single exemplified this format ("I Gotta Know") and became a national top-20 country hit. Follow-up rock singles between 1957 and 1959 failed gaining enough attention to become hits including, "Hot Dog! That Made Him Mad", "Fujiyama Mama", and "Honey Bop". In 1960 however, the rock and roll-themed, "Let's Have a Party", became Jackson's first Billboard top-40 pop hit after it was picked up by an Iowa disc jockey.

As rock and roll's popularity declined, Jackson started releasing singles targeted specifically toward the country market. Her 1961 releases, "Right or Wrong" and "In the Middle of a Heartache", became top-10 hits on the Billboard country chart respectively. Further country pop releases from 1962 to 1964 became minor Billboard country and pop hits; "A Little Bitty Tear", "If I Cried Every Time You Hurt Me", and "Slippin'". In 1965, Jackson started recording in German as well as English. Her debut German single, "Santo Domingo", went to number five in Germany and a series of international singles followed suit. Continuing as a country performer, most of Jackson's singles peaked in the top 40 on the country chart. Considered "self-assertive" song names by critics, titles included, "The Box It Came In" (1966), "Tears Will Be the Chaser for Your Wine" (1966), "A Girl Don't Have to Drink to Have Fun" (1967), "My Baby Walked Right Out on Me" (1968), and "My Big Iron Skillet" (1969).

In 1971, Jackson converted to Christianity and recorded a gospel single that year entitled "People Gotta Be Loving". Before signing to the Christian label, Word Records, Jackson had two top-20 Billboard country hits with "A Woman Lives for Love" (1970) and "Fancy Satin Pillows" (1971). Through Word and later Myrrh Records, she issued several Christian and gospel singles until the end of the 1970s such as "Jesus Put a Yodel in My Soul" (1974). She spent the next decade recording gospel music and performing religious touring shows, until European rock and roll revivalists sought out Jackson. From the renewed success, Jackson issued two rock and roll singles in the 1980s including, "My Party" (1988), a duet with Karel Zich. In the 1990s, she primarily toured as a rock and gospel artist without releasing any singles. After several more album releases in the 2000s, Jack White of the successful rock band, The White Stripes, produced Jackson's comeback album, The Party Ain't Over. The release spawned Jackson's first pair of singles since the 1980s: "Thunder on the Mountain" and "You Know I'm No Good".

== Singles ==
=== 1950s ===
List of singles, with selected chart positions, showing other relevant details
Title	Year	Peak chart positions		Album
Title	Year	US Cou.	JPN	Album
"You Can't Have My Love" (with Billy Gray)	1954	8	—	—N/a
"The Right to Love"	1954	—	—	—N/a
"You'd Be the First One to Know"	1954	—	—	—N/a
"Tears at the Grand Ole Opry"	1955	—	—	—N/a
"It's the Same World (Wherever You Go)"	1955	—	—	—N/a
"Wasted"	1956	—	—	—N/a
"I Gotta Know"	1956	15	—	Rockin' with Wanda
"Hot Dog! That Made Him Mad"	1956	—	—	Rockin' with Wanda
"The Heart You Could Have Had"	1957	—	—	—N/a
"Baby Loves Him"	1957	—	—	Rockin' with Wanda
"Don'a Wan'a"	1957	—	—	Rockin' with Wanda
"Cool Love"	1957	—	—	Rockin' with Wanda
"Fujiyama Mama"	1957	—	1	Rockin' with Wanda
"Honey Bop"	1958	—	—	Rockin' with Wanda
"Mean Mean Man"	1958	—	—	Rockin' with Wanda
"Rock Your Baby"	1958	—	—	Rockin' with Wanda
"You've Turned to a Stranger"	1959	—	—	Rockin' with Wanda
"You're the One for Me"	1959	—	—	Rockin' with Wanda
"Reaching"	1959	—	—	—N/a
"—" denotes a recording that did not chart or was not released in that territory.

=== 1960s ===
List of singles, with selected chart positions, showing other relevant details
Title	Year	Peak chart positions							Album
Title	Year	US	US AC	US Cou.	AUS	CAN Cou.	NLD	UK	Album
"Please Call Today"	1960	—	—	—	—	—	—	—	—N/a
"Let's Have a Party"	1960	37	—	—	6	—	17	32	Wanda Jackson
"Mean Mean Man" (re-release)	1960	—	—	—	33	—	—	40	Wanda Jackson
"Little Charm Bracelet"	1961	—	—	—	—	—	—	—	Wanda Jackson Sings Country Songs
"Right or Wrong"	1961	29	9	9	33	—	—	—	Right or Wrong
"In the Middle of a Heartache"	1961	27	—	6	73	—	—	—	Wonderful Wanda
"A Little Bitty Tear"	1961	84	—	—	38	—	—	—	Wonderful Wanda
"If I Cried Every Time You Hurt Me"	1962	58	16	28	—	—	—	—	Wonderful Wanda
"I Misunderstood"	1962	— (Note: "I Misunderstood" peaked at number 17 on the Billboard Bubbling Under Hot 100 singles chart, a list which acts as a 25-song extension of the Hot 100.)	—	—	—	—	—	—	—N/a
"The Greatest Actor"	1962	— (Note: "The Greatest Actor" peaked at number 17 on the Billboard Bubbling Under Hot 100 singles chart, a list which acts as a 25-song extension of the Hot 100.)	—	—	—	—	—	—	—N/a
"One Teardrop at a Time"	1962	—	—	—	—	—	—	—	Wanda Jackson Sings Country Songs
"But I Was Lying"	1963	—	—	—	—	—	—	—	—N/a
"This Should Go on Forever"	1963	—	—	—	—	—	—	—	—N/a
"Let Me Talk to You"	1963	—	—	—	—	—	—	—	Reckless Love Affair
"Slippin'"	1963	—	—	46	—	—	—	—	Wanda Jackson Sings Country Songs
"The Violet and the Rose"	1964	—	—	36	—	—	—	—	Wanda Jackson Sings Country Songs
"Leave My Baby Alone"	1964	—	—	—	—	—	—	—	—N/a
"Candy Man"	1964	—	—	—	—	—	—	—	Two Sides of Wanda
"Kickin' Our Hearts Around"	1965	—	—	—	—	—	—	—	Wanda Jackson Sings Country Songs
"Have I Grown Used to Missing You"	1965	—	—	—	—	—	—	—	Wanda Jackson Sings Country Songs
"My First Day Without You"	1965	—	—	—	—	—	—	—	Wanda Jackson Sings Country Songs
"The Box It Came In"	1966	—	—	18	—	—	—	—	Reckless Love Affair
"Because It's You"	1966	—	—	28	—	—	—	—	Reckless Love Affair
"This Gun Don't Care"	1966	—	—	46	—	—	—	—	Reckless Love Affair
"Tears Will Be the Chaser for Your Wine"	1966	—	—	11	—	—	—	—	Reckless Love Affair
"Both Sides of the Line" (with The Party Timers)	1967	—	—	21	—	—	—	—	You'll Always Have My Love
"My Heart Gets All the Breaks" (with The Party Timers)	1967	—	—	51	—	—	—	—	You'll Always Have My Love
"A Girl Don't Have to Drink to Have Fun" (with The Party Timers)	1967	—	—	22	—	—	—	—	Cream of the Crop
"By the Time You Get to Phoenix" (with The Party Timers)	1968	—	—	46	—	—	—	—	Wanda Jackson Country!
"My Baby Walked Right Out on Me" (with The Party Timers)	1968	—	—	34	—	—	—	—	Cream of the Crop
"Little Boy Soldier" (with The Party Timers)	1968	—	—	46	—	—	—	—	Cream of the Crop
"I Wish I Was Your Friend" (with The Party Timers)	1968	—	—	51	—	—	—	—	The Many Moods of Wanda Jackson
"If I Had a Hammer"	1969	—	—	41	—	—	—	—	The Many Moods of Wanda Jackson
"Your Tender Love"	1969	—	—	—	—	—	—	—	The Happy Side of Wanda
"Everything's Leaving"	1969	—	—	48	—	—	—	—	Wanda Jackson Country!
"My Big Iron Skillet"	1969	—	—	20	—	—	—	—	Wanda Jackson Country!
"Two Separate Bar Stools"	1969	—	—	35	—	41	—	—	Wanda Jackson Country!
"—" denotes a recording that did not chart or was not released in that territory.

=== 1970s ===
List of singles, with selected chart positions, showing other relevant details
Title	Year	Peak chart positions		Album
Title	Year	US Cou.	CAN Cou.	Album
"A Woman Lives for Love"	1970	17	—	A Woman Lives for Love
"Who Shot John"	1970	50	—	—N/a
"Fancy Satin Pillows"	1970	13	26	I've Gotta Sing
"People Gotta Be Loving" (with The Oak Ridge Boys)	1971	—	—	Praise the Lord
"Back Then"	1971	25	—	I Wouldn't Want You Any Other Way
"I Already Know (What I'm Getting for My Birthday)"	1971	35	—	I Wouldn't Want You Any Other Way
"I'll Be Whatever You Say"	1972	57	—	I Wouldn't Want You Any Other Way
"I Wouldn't Want You Any Other Way"	1972	—	—	I Wouldn't Want You Any Other Way
"Tennessee Women's Prison"	1972	—	—	Country Keepsakes
"Your Memory Comes and Gets Me"	1973	—	—	Country Keepsakes
"When It's Time to Fall in Love Again"	1973	—	—	When It's Time to Fall in Love Again
"Come on Home (To This Lonely Heart)"	1973	98	—	When It's Time to Fall in Love Again
"Jesus Put a Yodel in My Soul"	1974	—	—	Now I Have Everything
"Where Do I Put His Memory"	1974	—	—	I'll Still Love You
"I Can't Stand to Hear You Say Goodbye"	1975	—	—	I'll Still Love You
"Touring That City"	1975	—	—	Make Me Like a Child Again
"I'll Still Love You"	1976	—	—	I'll Still Love You
"—" denotes a recording that did not chart or was not released in that territory.

=== 1980s–2020s ===
List of singles, showing all relevant details
Title	Year	Album	Ref.
"Don't Let the Good Times Fool You"	1980	Good Times	
"Meet Me in Stockholm"	1985	Rockabilly Fever	
"My Party" (with Karel Zich)	1988	Let's Have a Party in Prague	
"Good Rockin' Tonight"	2007	I Remember Elvis	
"You Know I'm No Good"	2011	The Party Ain't Over	
"Thunder on the Mountain	2011	The Party Ain't Over	
"Tore Down"	2012	Unfinished Business	
"It Keeps Right On a-Hurtin'"	2021	Encore	

== Foreign-language singles ==
List of singles, with selected chart positions, showing other relevant details
Title	Year	Peak chart positions			Album
Title	Year	AUT	BEL	GER	Album
"Santo Domingo"	1965	1	14	5	Made in Germany
"Morgen, Ja Morgen"	1965	—	—	36	Made in Germany
"Doch dann kam Johnny"	1965	8	—	26	Made in Germany
"Komm Heim, Mein Wandersmann"	1965	—	—	—	Made in Germany
"Wer an Das Meer Sein Herz Verliert"	1966	—	—	—	Made in Germany
"Wenn Der Abschied Kommt"	1966	—	—	32	Made in Germany
"Vom Winde Verweht"	1967	—	—	—	Made in Germany
"Addio My Love"	1967	—	—	—	Made in Germany
"Warum Gleich Tränen"	1970	—	—	—	—N/a
"—" denotes releases that did not chart

== Other charted songs ==
List of charted songs, with selected chart positions, showing other relevant details
Title	Year	Peak chart positions	Album	Notes
Title	Year	US Country	Album	Notes
"You'll Always Have My Love"	1967	64	You'll Always Have My Love	(Note: Originally released as the B-side to the single "My Heart Gets All the Breaks".)

== Music videos ==
List of music videos, showing year released and director
Title	Year	Director(s)	Ref.
"Thunder on the Mountain"	2011	thirty two	
"Tore Down"	2012	Seth Graves	
"Am I Even a Memory"	2012	Seth Graves	
