= The Wanda Jackson Show: Live and Still Kickin' =

Live album by Wanda Jackson
- Released: March 25, 2003
- Recorded: December 7, 2002
- Venue: Arlene Grocery; Village Underground
- Genre: Country; Rockabilly
- Label: DCN
- Producer: Brad Navin; Usher Winslett

Wanda Jackson chronology
The Queen of Rock' a 'Billy (1997)	The Wanda Jackson Show: Live and Still Kickin' (2003)	Heart Trouble (2003)

The Wanda Jackson Show: Live and Still Kickin' is a live album by American recording artist Wanda Jackson. It was released on March 25, 2003 via the Digital Club Network and contained a total of 27 tracks. The album was recorded in New York City nearly a year prior and marked Jackson's first American live record in over two decades. It was also the third live album of her career. The disc received positive reviews from critics following its release.

== Background and content ==
Wanda Jackson had not recorded a live album for the American market in over 20 years. She had previously released a live project with Capitol Records in 1969 that had been issued in North America. She then released a second live disc in 1989 for her European fan base. On December 7, 2002, she appeared at the Village Underground in New York City (and later at Arlene Grocery) where she ultimately recorded her third live project. The project was recorded when Jackson was sixty five years old. It was produced by Brad Navin and Usher Winslett. It also featured Jackson's touring band named The Party Timers.

Live and Still Kickin' consisted of 27 tracks, mixing Jackson's Country and Rockabilly material. This included live versions of her Rockabilly recordings, like "Hot Dog! That Made Him Mad", "Fujiyama Mama" and "Let's Have a Party". On the album, Jackson also included covers of Hank Williams' "Lovesick Blues" and Bob Seger's "Old Time Rock and Roll".

== Release and reception ==
Professional ratings
Review scores
Source	Rating
Allmusic	3/5 stars

Live and Still Kickin' was released on March 25, 2003 on the Digital Club Network, a New York label formally titled DCN. It was issued as a compact disc and marked Jackson's third live recording in her career. It was also her 71st album in total. The album was received positively by music critics and journalists. Andrew Gilstrap of PopMatters praised Jackson's vocal performance and was surprised to find her to have youthful energy: "Not only is she alive, but she’s in her mid-60s with a surprising amount of her presence and vocal range intact — especially her trademark growl." Ken Burke of Country Standard Time commented that "the 65-year-old Oklahoma legend transforms her live nightclub set into an entertaining mini-history lesson."

Rock critic Robert Christgau explained that the album "offers proof aplenty that she [Jackson] remains likable, lively, and spunky." Although no formal review was given by AllMusic, the music website rated the album three stars out of five.

== Track listing ==
The Wanda Jackson Show: Live and Still Kickin'
No.	Title	Writer(s)	Length
1.	"Rock-A-Billy Fever"	Carl Perkins	4:20
2.	"Old Time Rock & Roll"	George Jackson; Thomas E. Jones III; Bob Seger	2:49
3.	"Rock 'N' Roll Journey"		1:57
4.	"Mean, Mean Man"	Wanda Jackson	2:20
5.	"I'm a Singer"		1:56
6.	"I Gotta Know"	Thelma Blackmon	2:32
7.	"Guitar in All the Right Places"		1:53
8.	"Blue Yodel #6"	Jimmie Rodgers	3:04
9.	"My Mentor"		1:06
10.	"Wild Side of Life/Honky Tonk Angels"	Arlie Carter; J.D. Miller; William Warren	3:03
11.	"When I Was a Young Girl"		0:54
12.	"Lovesick Blues"	Cliff Friend; Irving Mills	2:28
13.	"#1 in Japan"		2:37
14.	"Fujiyama Mama"	Earl Borrows	2:31
15.	"For All the Girls"		0:42
16.	"Hot Dog! That Made Him Mad"	Danny Barker; Don Raye	3:08
17.	"Toot Your Own Horn"		2:12
18.	"Right or Wrong"	Jackson	2:37
19.	"The One Joint I Missed"		0:46
20.	"Riot in Cell Block Number 9"	Jerry Leiber and Mike Stoller	2:31
21.	"This Guy Was Different"		3:09
22.	"One Night with You"	Dave Bartholomew; Pearl King	2:22
23.	"The Very Best Thing"		1:04
24.	"I Saw the Light"	Williams	2:26
25.	"Grab a D Chord and Hold On"		2:27
26.	"Let's Have a Party"	Jessie Mae Robinson	2:53
27.	"Whole Lotta Shakin'/Rip It Up"	D. David; David Curlee Williams	5:16
Total length:			1:05:23

== Personnel ==
All credits are adapted from the liner notes of Live and Still Kickin' and AllMusic.

Musical personnel

- Jim Duffy – Piano
- Wanda Jackson – Lead vocals
- Mark Spencer – Lap steel guitar, lead guitar
- Robert B. Warren – Band leader
- Doug Wygal – Drums

Technical personnel

- Ian Bryan – Arlene Grocery Sound Engineer
- Danny Garcia – Editing, mastering, mixing
- Holly George-Warren – Tray card text
- Bernardo Muricy – Village Underground sound engineer
- Jessica Nathanson – Project manager
- Brad Navin – Executive producer
- Dave Richman – Album artwork
- Steven Sandlick – Album photos
- John Steiner – Village Underground sound engineer
- Usher Winslett – Executive producer

== Release history ==
Region	Date	Format	Label	Ref.
North America	March 25, 2003	Compact Disc	Digital Club Network (DCN)	
