= The Best of Wanda Jackson =

Compilation album by Wanda Jackson
- Released: February 1968
- Recorded: 1958 – 1966
- Genres: Country; Rockabilly
- Label: Capitol
- Producer: Ken Nelson

Wanda Jackson chronology
Made in Germany (1967)	The Best of Wanda Jackson (1968)	Cream of the Crop (1968)

The Best of Wanda Jackson is a compilation album by American recording artist Wanda Jackson. It was released in February 1968 via Capitol Records and contained 12 previously released tracks. It was Jackson's third compilation album released in her career and featured some of Jackson's most commercially-successful singles up to that point. The album reached a charting position on the country LP's survey in the United States following its release.

== Background, content and release ==
On the Capitol Records label, Wanda Jackson recorded both Rockabilly and Country music. During the 1950s, Jackson released several Rockabilly-styled singles, notably the top 40 pop hit "Let's Have a Party". She then recorded country music in the 1960s and had top ten country hits in the United States, including "Right or Wrong". The Best of Wanda Jackson contained her most popular Rockabilly and Country songs, all of which had been previously released. The album's material was recorded in sessions between 1958 and 1966 produced by Ken Nelson. A total of 12 songs were chosen for the compilation. Three of these recordings were composed by Jackson herself.

The Best of Wanda Jackson was released on Capitol Records in February 1968. It was the third compilation release of Jackson's music career and the second issued for the English language market. The album was originally distributed as a vinyl LP, containing six songs on either side of the record. The LP spent seven weeks on the Billboard Top Country Albums in the United States, peaking at number 29 in April 1968. It was her fifth album to reach the Billboard country chart and her first compilation to do so.

== Track listing ==
Side one
No.	Title	Writer(s)	Length
1.	"Right or Wrong"	Wanda Jackson	2:36
2.	"In the Middle of a Heartache"	Laurie Christenson; Pat Franzese; Jackson	2:34
3.	"If I Cried Every Time You Hurt Me"	Harlan Howard	2:32
4.	"A Little Bitty Tear"	Hank Cochran	2:16
5.	"The Violet and the Rose"	Billy Auge; Little Jimmy Dickens; John Reinfield; Mel Tillis	2:50
6.	"Santo Domingo"	Bert Olden; Joachim Relin	3:04

Side two
No.	Title	Writer(s)	Length
1.	"Tears Will Be the Chaser for Your Wine"	LeRoy Coates; Dale Davis	2:21
2.	"I Wonder If She Knows"	Yvonne DeVaney	2:50
3.	"Kickin' Our Hearts Around"	Jackson	2:18
4.	"The Box It Came In"	Vic McAlpin	2:23
5.	"Reckless Love Affair"	Rolley Baird	2:40
6.	"Let's Have a Party"	Jessie Mae Robinson	2:07

== Chart performance ==
Chart (1968)	Peak position
US Top Country Albums (Billboard)	29

== Release history ==
Region	Date	Format	Label	Ref.
Australia, Canada and United States	February 1968	Vinyl	Capitol Records	
Japan	February 1968	Vinyl	Capitol Records	
