= Heart Trouble (album) =

Studio album by Wanda Jackson
- Released: October 14, 2003
- Studio: Steakhouse Studio
- Genres: Rockabilly; country
- Length: 47:28
- Label: CMH
- Producers: Aretha Sills; John Wooler

Wanda Jackson chronology
The Wanda Jackson Show: Live and Still Kickin' (2003)	Heart Trouble (2003)	I Remember Elvis (2006)

Heart Trouble is a studio album by American recording artist Wanda Jackson. It was released on October 14, 2003 via CMH Records and contained 16 tracks. The disc was Jackson's forty first studio release of her career and her first disc released in the United States in a decade. The album was a mixture of rockabilly and country recordings, featuring collaborations with musicians Elvis Costello, The Cramps, Dave Alvin, Lee Rocker (Stray Cats) and Rosie Flores. Heart Trouble received a positive response from critics following its release.

== Background ==
Wanda Jackson had kept a busy touring schedule during much of the 1990s and early 2000s. According to Jackson herself, she had not released a proper rock album "in decades". In recent years, she had released gospel recordings, such as Generations (Of Gospel Music) (1993) and rock albums overseas such as The Queen of Rock' a 'Billy (1997). According to her autobiography, Jackson had originally planned to make an album of bluegrass songs. However, when word spread that she would be recording a new album in California, several rock musicians asked to be part of the project. "I might have been a grandma, but it was time rock again!", she recalled in her book.

== Recording and content ==
Heart Trouble was produced by John Wooler, along with Anita Sills serving as executive producer. The album's sessions were recorded at the Steakhouse Studio, located in Hollywood, California. Jackson recalled enjoying the recording of Heart Trouble because she had time to prepare material: "Today, the process is approached much differently, and it was fun for me to take some time thinking about the arrangements and building rapport with the musicians." The album featured several collaborations with rock musicians, including Elvis Costello. Costello was brought to the project through the album's drummer Pete Thomas, who worked with him. Costello chose to record a duet version of Buck Owens' "Crying Time". The song was cut live in the studio. Jackson also recorded a cover of The Louvin Brothers "Cash on the Barrelhead". The album's title track was first recorded and released as a single by Martina McBride in 1994, reaching the top 25 of the American country songs chart.

Jackson also collaborated with rock group The Cramps for a remake of Jackson's 1961 song "Funnel of Love". Dave Alvin was also featured on several of the album's tracks, providing guitar instrumentation to three songs, including "Rockabilly Fever". Rosie Flores also joined Jackson for the project and recorded her self-penned track "Woman Walk Out the Door". The pair originally worked together ten years prior when Jackson appeared on Flores' 1995 album Rockabilly Filly. In addition, the Cadillac Angels joined Jackson on a remake of "Hard Headed Woman". Along with these remakes, Jackson re-recorded "Let's Have a Party", "Mean Mean Man" and "Riot in Cell Block Number 9".

== Critical reception ==
Professional ratings
Review scores
Source	Rating
Allmusic	4/5 stars
Blender	2/5 stars

Heart Trouble received mostly positive reviews upon its release. Thom Jurek of AllMusic gave the project a four-star rating, citing the album's "killer collection of songs" and Jackson's vocals that were "in fine shape". "Simply put, this is a rock & roll dream, full of raw, sharp performances, killer songs, and Jackson's irrepressible ability to take even the most innocent song and make it salacious," he concluded. Charlotte Robinson of PopMatters found that Jackson "is one of the few ’50s country/rock fusionists remaining who still tours on a regular basis and sounds just about as good as she did back in the day." Robinson praised the album's collaborations with Elvis Costello and Rosie Flores. She concluded positively in review, saying, "Still, to hear Jackson, now a grandmother, capture most of the snarls and hiccups she did in the old days is a real treat. Unlike many a smokin’, drinkin’ rocker, she's taken good care of her voice (are you listening Stevie Nicks?) and still has pretty impressive pipes. Thankfully, she's using them in the right way on this release, which is in every way a winner."

The album also received a positive response from OffBeat magazine, who compared it to Johnny Cash's American Recordings releases. "Heart Trouble is an excellent mix of new songs crafted to sound like the country and rockabilly standards that they join on this CD," reviewer Mike Perciaccante commented. Jon Johnson gave the album a mostly positive response, but criticized the record's rhythm section, highlighting the project's upright bass player and drummer. Still, Heart Trouble is well worth a listen, if only to marvel at Jackson's eternally young vocals," Johnson concluded. Robert Christgau wrote in Blender magazine that the album was well-produced but also criticized parts of the record. "Additional oomph, however, is in short supply here," he wrote.

== Release ==
Heart Trouble was released on October 14, 2003 on CMH Records. It was originally distributed as a compact disc with 16 tracks. The same year, the album was distributed as a vinyl LP by Sympathy for the Record Industry, featuring 13 tracks. In the 2010s, the album was offered to digital sites including Apple Music. Following its original release, Jackson discussed the album with Country Music Television and noted she was pleased with the record's response: "All the reviews have talked about the energy the songs still have — and how I’ve still got the growl. It still sounds like Wanda Jackson. I guess that's the main thing."

== Track listings ==
Heart Trouble
No.	Title	Writer(s)	Length
1.	"Heart Trouble"	Paul Kennerley	3:12
2.	"Cash on the Barrelhead"	Charlie Louvin; Ira Louvin	3:29
3.	"Funnel of Love" (featuring The Cramps)	Charlie McCoy; Kent Westbury	2:32
4.	"Woman, Walk Out the Door" (with Rosie Flores featuring Lee Rocker)	Hank DeVito; Rosie Flores	3:35
5.	"Crying Time" (with Elvis Costello)	Buck Owens	3:01
6.	"Mean Mean Man"	Wanda Jackson	2:04
7.	"It Happens Every Time" (featuring Dave Alvin)	Kennerley	2:51
8.	"Riot in Cell Block #9" (featuring The Cramps)	Jerry Leiber and Mike Stoller	2:56
9.	"Anytime You Wanna Fool Around"	A. Miller	3:33
10.	"Hard Headed Woman" (featuring Cadillac Angels)	Claude Demetrius	2:28
11.	"Lonely for You"	Kennerley	2:16
12.	"What Gives You the Right (To Do Me Wrong)"	Flores	2:49
13.	"Rockabilly Fever" (featuring Dave Alvin)	Carl Perkins	3:59
14.	"It'll Be Me" (featuring Dave Alvin)	Jack Clement	2:46
15.	"Walk with Me"	James Intveld	3:43
16.	"Let's Have a Party"	Jessie Mae Robinson	2:14
Total length:			47:28

== Personnel ==
All credits are adapted from the liner notes of Heart Trouble and AllMusic.

Musical personnel

- Dave Alvin – Guitar, guest artist
- Tony Balbinot – Guitar
- Brigette Bryant Blade – Background vocals
- Cadillac Angels – Background vocals, guest artist
- Elvis Costello – Acoustic guitar, guest artist, duet vocals
- The Cramps – Background vocals, guest artist
- Davey Faragher – Bass
- Rosie Flores – Background vocals, guest artist
- Siedah Garrett – Background vocals
- Stephen Hodges – Drums
- Dorian Holley – Background vocals
- Smokey Hormel – Banjo, guitar, mandolin
- James Intveld – Rhythm guitar
- Lux Interior – Background vocals
- Wanda Jackson – Lead vocals
- Randy Jacobs – Guitar
- Neil Larsen – Piano
- John McFee – Pedal steel guitar
- John Palmer – Drums
- Poison Ivy – Background vocals, guitar
- Lee Rocker – Bass, guest artist
- Larry Taylor – Bass
- Pete Thomas – Drums
- Michael Hart Thompson – Organ

Technical personnel

- Adam Byrne – Design, layout design
- John Cranfield – Assistant engineer
- Oz Fritz – Engineering, mixing
- Stephen Hodges – Percussion
- Sophie Olmstead – Photography
- Collin Rae – A&R
- Ron Sievers – Design, layout design
- Aretha Sills – A&R, executive producer
- Johnny Whiteside – Liner notes
- John Wooler – Producer

== Release history ==
Region	Date	Format	Label	Ref.
North America	October 14, 2003	Compact disc	CMH Records	
North America	October 14, 2003	Vinyl	Sympathy for the Record Industry	
North America	2010s	Music download; streaming	CMH Records	
