= Funnel of Love =

Single by Wanda Jackson
- A-side: "Right or Wrong"
- Released: April 1961
- Recorded: October 28, 1960
- Studio: Bradley Studios, Nashville, Tennessee
- Genre: Country; rock and roll
- Length: 2:08
- Label: Capitol
- Songwriters: Charles McCoy; Kent Westbury
- Producer: Ken Nelson

Wanda Jackson singles chronology
"Little Charm Bracelet" (1961)	"Right or Wrong" / "Funnel of Love" (1961)	"In the Middle of a Heartache" (1961)

"Funnel of Love" is a song by Wanda Jackson written by Charlie McCoy (credited as "Charles McCoy") and Kent Westbury. Recorded in 1960 and released in 1961, "Funnel of Love" was released as the B-side to Jackson's major country-pop single, "Right or Wrong". Although the song never became a hit independently from the A-side, it has received notable critical acclaim and attention. The song's unique combination of country, rock, and blues have made it a favorite of fans and critics. Many also consider "Funnel of Love" to be one of Jackson's best vocal performances.

== Background ==
Charlie McCoy, a country musician, and Kent Westbury, a country songwriter, wrote the lyrics and melody to "Funnel of Love". The song came to the attention of Jackson while recording for Capitol Records in 1960, under the direction of producer Ken Nelson. Up to this point, Jackson had been known as both a country and rock and roll performer. One of the few women of the era performing rock, she had hits with "You Can't Have My Love" (1954) and "Let's Have a Party" (1960). In an interview with Philadelphia Weekly, Jackson recounted that it was difficult identifying "Funnel of Love" with a specific musical genre, stating that its style was not like that of a typical country or rock recording: "It wasn’t country, it wasn’t rock, but we knew it was a good song. So we made a good record on it."

== Recording ==
The song was well received by both Jackson and Ken Nelson, leading to its initial recording. "Funnel of Love" was recorded at the Bradley Film and Recording Studio in Nashville, Tennessee, United States on October 28, 1960. The session was Jackson's third recording session in Nashville. Jackson and Nelson had been recording material in Hollywood, California since the early 1950s. Also cut at the session was the eventual A-side to "Funnel of Love" entitled "Right or Wrong", as well as "Riot in Cell Block #9" and "Little Charm Bracelet". The latter was the precessing single to "Right or Wrong". Included in the recording session was The Nashville A-Team of musicians, which appeared on most country recording sessions in the late 1950s and 1960s. The song's guitar solo is performed by Roy Clark, who was a member of Jackson's band "The Party Timers" and would later have a successful country music career.

== Release and reception ==
"Funnel of Love" was released in April 1961 as the B-side to "Right or Wrong". The songs were released on Capitol Records, and later anthologized by Omnivore Recordings as part of The Best of the Classic Capitol Singles. The A-side became Jackson's second top-10 entry on the US Billboard Hot Country and Western Sides chart, peaking at number nine. It also became her second top-40 single on the US Hot 100, reaching number 29. "Funnel of Love", however, failed to enter any Billboard charts.

"Funnel of Love" was never released via an album during Jackson's time at Capitol Records. The song went unreleased on an album until Bear Family Records released the Jackson box set Right or Wrong in 1992. "Funnel of Love" was then released onto various compilations during the 1990s and 2000s. The song has since received vast critical acclaim from multiple music critics. Adam Gold of Rolling Stone called Jackson's song a "greasy classic" and Tim Sendra of AllMusic explained that although "Funnel of Love" is not associated with the "girl group" sound of the 1960s, it "adds historical interest" and is "really quite good too". Chris Parker of Philadelphia Weekly stated that "Funnel of Love" was one of his favorite songs by Jackson.

== Legacy ==
With the renewal of interest in Jackson's career since the 1990s, "Funnel of Love" has become a favorite of Wanda Jackson fans. Many were surprised that the B-side did not become more successful. It has since been covered by various musical artists, including Rosie Flores. In 2001, foreign music group Velvetone released a single version of "Funnel of Love", featuring Jackson herself. Jackson revisited "Funnel of Love" on her 2003 studio album, Heart Trouble. The new version featured the punk rock band The Cramps as guest performers.

"Funnel of Love" has also served as an inspiration for new musical artists, most notably British soul artist Adele. According to Jackson, Adele mentioned to her that if she had not heard "Funnel of Love", then her 2010 single "Rolling in the Deep" may have never existed. In 2010, Adele explained how Jackson's music affected her, "I got addicted to this Wanda Jackson hits album," says the singer. "She's so cheeky and so raunchy. She's kind of like the female Elvis: really sexual, not afraid to embarrass herself." Adele's interest in her music led to a stint as Jackson serving as her opening act in Britain between 2011 and 2012. American singer, Cyndi Lauper, covered "Funnel of Love" as part of her 2016 album of country cover tunes called Detour. It was subsequently released as a single that year with a corresponding music video that was filmed at a restaurant in Pioneertown, California. Lauper recorded the song because she considered Jackson a considerable influence on her career.

== Track listing ==
7" vinyl single

- "Right or Wrong" – 2:36
- "Funnel of Love" – 2:08
