= Let's Have a Party in Prague =

Studio album by Wanda Jackson and Karel Zich
- Released: 1988
- Recorded: May 1987
- Studio: Supraphon Studio
- Genre: Rockabilly
- Label: Supraphon
- Producer: Stanislav Chmelík

Wanda Jackson chronology
Teach Me to Love (1984)	Let's Have a Party in Prague (1988)	Classy Country (1988)

Karel Zich chronology
& (1987)	Let's Have a Party in Prague (1988)	Ani Za Nic (1990)

Singles from Let's Have a Party in Prague
- 1. "My Party" Released: 1988

Let's Have a Party in Prague is a studio album by American recording artist Wanda Jackson and European recording artist Karel Zich. It was released on the Supraphon label in 1988 and contained a total of 13 tracks. The album was a collection of Rockabilly songs released exclusively for the European market. It was Jackson's first collaborative studio album and Zich's second. One single was spawned from the album in 1988.

== Background and content ==
Wanda Jackson was among the first women to have commercial success in both country music and Rockabilly (later known as rock and roll) music. Her singles included "Let's Have a Party", "In the Middle of a Heartache" and "The Box It Came In". She focused more on gospel music in the 1970s and recorded a series of albums for several spiritual labels. By the 1980s, her popularity had waned and she recalled feeling past her prime in her 2017 autobiography. However, in 1984, Jackson learned of Rockabilly's revival in Europe and recorded her first rock album in several decades the same year. Among the European rock projects she collaborated on was with Czech performer Karel Zich.

Known as the "Iron Curtain Elvis", Zich's Rockabilly records found success in several eastern European countries. Jackson recalled in a 2005 interview first meeting Zich at a Czech airport and began recording an album shortly after. Let's Have a Party in Prague was recorded at the Supraphon studio in Prague, a capital of the Czech Republic. Sessions were held in May 1987 alongside producer Stanislav Chmelík who recorded 13 tracks with the pair. All of the songs were duets between both artists, including a re-working of Jackson's "Mean Mean Man", "Let's Have a Party" and "Right or Wrong". Zich contributed five self-composed songs to the project. Also included was a cover of Johnny Cash and June Carter's "Jackson".

== Release ==
Let's Have a Party in Prague was released in 1988 on the Supraphon label, exclusively for the Czech market in Europe. It was originally issued as a vinyl LP, with seven songs on "Side A" and six songs on "Side B". It was also distributed with the same identification number as a compact disc. In addition, the disc was issued as a cassette, with songs on both sides of the tape. The album was Jackson's thirty second studio recording and Zich's tenth. Jackson's and Zich's "My Party" was spawned as the album's only single, which also occurred in 1988. The single was issued as a seven-inch vinyl record, containing the duo's cover "Jackson" on the B-side. A year following the album's original release, it sold an estimated 220,000 copies in Czechoslovakia. In 1990, the album certified gold in sales in the nation.

== Track listings ==
=== Vinyl and cassette versions ===
Side one
No.	Title	Writer(s)	Length
1.	"Let's Have a Party"	Jessie Mae Robinson	2:20
2.	"Long-Legged Guitar Pickin' Man"	Marshall Grant	2:42
3.	"Losing Game (Podnik Ztrátový)"	Michal Bukovič; Karel Zich	3:10
4.	"My Party"	Bukovič; Zich	2:25
5.	"Right or Wrong"	Wanda Jackson	2:33
6.	"Good Bye (Tak Čau)"	Bukovič; Chmelík	2:28
7.	"Mean Mean Man"	Jackson	2:05

Side two
No.	Title	Writer(s)	Length
1.	"Jackson"	Gaby Rogers; Billy Ed Wheeler	3:05
2.	"It's My Job (Paráda)"	Bukovič; Zich	3:35
3.	"Summer On My Mind (Léto Jak Má Být)"	Chmelík; Miloš Skalka	3:10
4.	"Crying in the Chapel"	Artie Glenn	2:20
5.	"5-4-3-2-1 (Tři Jsou Někdy Víc)"	Bukovič; Zich	3:26
6.	"Wheels Of Rock'n'Roll (Kola Pop Music)"	Bukovič; Zich	2:23

=== Compact disc version ===
Let's Have a Party in Prague (CD)
No.	Title	Writer(s)	Length
1.	"Let's Have a Party"	Robinson	2:16
2.	"Long-Legged Guitar Pickin' Man"	Grant	2:42
3.	"Losing Game (Podnik Ztrátový)"	Bukovič; Zich	3:12
4.	"My Party"	Bukovič; Zich	2:22
5.	"Right or Wrong"	Jackson	2:33
6.	"Good Bye (Tak Čau)"	Bukovič; Chmelík	2:30
7.	"Mean Mean Man"	Jackson	2:06
8.	"Jackson"	Rogers; Wheeler	3:07
9.	"It's My Job (Paráda)"	Bukovič; Zich	3:40
10.	"Summer On My Mind (Léto Jak Má Být)"	Chmelík; Miloš Skalka	3:12
11.	"Crying in the Chapel"	Artie Glenn	2:20
12.	"5-4-3-2-1 (Tři Jsou Někdy Víc)"	Bukovič; Zich	3:27
13.	"Wheels Of Rock'n'Roll (Kola Pop Music)"	Bukovič; Zich	2:26

== Personnel ==
All credits are adapted from the liner notes of Let's Have a Party in Prague.

Musical and technical personnel

- Vlastimila Brčáková – Translator
- Michal Bukovič – Supervisor (editor)
- Stanislav Chmelík – Arranger, producer
- Wanda Jackson – Lead vocals
- Milan Kincl – Design
- Vít Popp – Recording Supervisor
- Josef Spěváček – Sleeve Notes
- Karel Zich – Lead vocals

== Release history ==
Region	Date	Format	Label	Ref.
Czechoslovakia	1988	Vinyl; cassette; compact disc	Supraphon	
