= Blues in My Heart (album) =

Studio album by Wanda Jackson
- Released: April 1965
- Recorded: May 1964
- Studio: Columbia Studio
- Genre: Country
- Label: Capitol
- Producer: Ken Nelson

Wanda Jackson chronology
Two Sides of Wanda (1964)	Blues in My Heart (1965)	Wanda Jackson Sings Country Songs (1965)

Blues in My Heart is a studio album by American recording artist Wanda Jackson. It was released in April 1965 via Capitol Records and contained 12 tracks. It was the seventh studio album released in Jackson's career and the first to reach the Billboard country chart. The record was a collection of traditional country songs centered around themes of having the blues. It received a positive review from Billboard magazine following its release.

== Background ==
Wanda Jackson was first known as a Rockabilly performer with a series of recordings during the 1950s, including "Fujiyama Mama" and the top 40 pop hit "Let's Have a Party". In 1961, she returned to the country market and had two top ten hits with the songs "Right or Wrong" and "In the Middle of a Heartache". According to Jackson, she started to become more associated with the country field as the 1960s progressed, which included the album Blues in My Heart. In her 2017 autobiography, Jackson commented that the record was among her favorite albums she ever made.

== Recording and content ==
Blues in My Heart consisted of 12 tracks. The songs included on the project were covers of songs first recorded by others. Only one tune composed by Harlan Howard was an original piece. Among its covers was Don Gibson's "Oh Lonesome Me, Hank Williams' "I'm So Lonesome I Could Cry" and Carl Belew's "Lonely Street". The album's theme was centered around having "the blues" and according to the liner notes, the project is intended to have a "lovely, lonesome sound". In addition, four of the album's tracks include the word "blues" in it. Blues in My Heart was recorded in May 1964 at the Columbia Studio in Nashville, Tennessee. The sessions were produced by Ken Nelson.

== Release and critical reception ==
Blues in My Heart was released in April 1965 on Capitol Records. It was the seventh studio album released in Jackson's career. The project was originally issued as a vinyl LP containing six tracks on either side of the record. In later decades, it was re-released in digital and streaming formats, including Apple Music. The album reached the top ten of the Billboard Top Country Albums chart, peaking at number nine in August 1965 after spending 14 weeks on the chart. To date, it is Jackson's highest-charting album on the country chart and was also her first to reach a peak position there. The record received a positive review from Billboard magazine in their May 1965 issue: "Wanda Jackson has returned to the country field in grand style and with a great selection of some country standards...this album is a must."

== Track listings ==
Side one
No.	Title	Writer(s)	Length
1.	"Blues in My Heart"	Red Foley; Jenny Lou Carson	2:10
2.	"Lonely Street"	Carl Belew; Kenny Sowder; W.S. Stevenson	2:30
3.	"Midnight"	Chet Atkins; Boudleaux Bryant	2:20
4.	"Weary Blues from Waitin'"	Hank Williams	3:15
5.	"I'm Waiting Just for You"	Henry Glover; Carolyn Leigh	2:03
6.	"Oh Lonesome Me"	Don Gibson	2:41

Side two
No.	Title	Writer(s)	Length
1.	"Blues Stay Away From Me"	Alton Delmore; Rabon Delmore; Glover; Wayne Raney	2:52
2.	"Worried Mind"	Ted Daffan; Jimmie Davis	2:50
3.	"Just for You"	Harlan Howard	2:40
4.	"I'm So Lonesome I Could Cry"	Williams	2:43
5.	"Nightlife"	Willie Nelson	2:14
6.	"Singin' the Blues"	Melvin Endsley	2:38

== Chart performance ==
Chart (1965)	Peak position
US Top Country Albums (Billboard)	9

== Release history ==
Region	Date	Format	Label	Ref.
United Kingdom	April 1965	Vinyl	Capitol Records	
Japan	April 1965	Vinyl	Capitol Records	
Canada; United States	April 1965	Vinyl	Capitol Records	
Canada; United States	2010s	Digital; Streaming	Capitol Records Nashville	
