= Closer to Jesus =

Studio album by Wanda Jackson
- Released: 1977
- Recorded: 1977
- Studio: Sound Stage Studio
- Genre: Country gospel
- Label: Word
- Producer: Gary S. Paxton

Wanda Jackson chronology
I'll Still Love You (1976)	Closer to Jesus (1977)	Good Times (1980)

Closer to Jesus is a studio album by American recording artist Wanda Jackson. It was released in 1977 via Word Records and contained a total of ten tracks. The disc was Jackson's twenty fifth studio collection released in her career and her fifth album to consist entirely of gospel recordings.

== Background and content ==
Wanda Jackson first achieved success in the Rockabilly and country music genres with hit singles like "Let's Have a Party" and "Tears Will Be the Chaser for Your Wine". In 1971, Jackson became a Christian and decided to leave her long-time label in pursuit of a record label that would give her more freedom to record gospel material. Signing with Word Records, she recorded several albums on the label during the 1970s, including Closer to Jesus. A total of ten tracks comprised the project, which was recorded in 1977 at the Sound Stage Studio, located in Nashville, Tennessee. The sessions were produced by Gary S. Paxton. It was Jackson's first album to be entirely produced by Paxton. The album's material was entirely gospel-themed, and included two tracks written by Marijohn Wilkin. Also included is a medley songs first written by gospel performer, Bill Gaither. A recording self-penned by Jackson is also featured on the album.

== Release ==
Closer to Jesus was released on Word Records in 1977. The album was her fifth gospel record and her second to be released solely by the Word label. The album was also Jackson's twenty fifth studio collection released in her career. The disc was originally distributed as a vinyl LP, containing five songs on each side of the record. The album failed to reach any Billboard chart positions, notably the Top Country Albums survey, which Jackson's albums often made appearances on. It was Jackson's final Word album release. In her autobiography, Jackson reflected on the album's release and found that the record was "not very memorable" in comparison with her other gospel albums she released in her career.

== Track listing ==
Side one
No.	Title	Writer(s)	Length
1.	"Where I'm Going"	Marijohn Wilkin	3:13
2.	"The World Didn't Give It to Me"	Bill Gaither; Gary S. Paxton	3:03
3.	"Carpenter's Son"	Dickey Lee	3:21
4.	"Grandma Sang Off-Key"	Vera Lakey	2:48
5.	"He Was There All the Time"	Paxton	3:24

Side two
No.	Title	Writer(s)	Length
1.	"Closer to Jesus"	Don Francisco	3:19
2.	"Learning to Learn"	John Stallings	3:51
3.	"Gaither Praise Medley" ("I Just Came to Praise the Lord", "I Just Feel That Something Good Is About to Happen", "Get All Excited")	Bill Gaither; Gloria Gaither	2:29
4.	"Walkin' in the Spirit"	Wanda Jackson	2:28
5.	"He's Been Through It Too"	Wilkin	3:39

== Personnel ==
All credits are adapted from the liner notes of Closer to Jesus.

Musical and technical personnel

- Buddy Huey – Sleeve notes
- Wanda Jackson – Lead vocals
- JMW – Lacquer cut
- Charles Wallis – Artwork

== Release history ==
Region	Date	Format	Label	Ref.
Canada; United States	1977	Vinyl	Word Records	
Sweden; United Kingdom	1977	Vinyl	Word Records	
