= Live in Scandinavia =

Live album by Wanda Jackson
- Released: 1989
- Recorded: 1984
- Venue: Falkets Falun
- Genre: Country; Rockabilly
- Label: Tab
- Producer: Kenth Larsson

Wanda Jackson chronology
| Don't Worry Be Happy (1989) | Live in Scandinavia (1989) | Goin' on with My Jesus (1991) |

Live in Scandinavia is a live album by American recording artist Wanda Jackson. It was released in 1989 on Tab Records and contained 14 tracks. The album was collection of country and Rockabilly songs. It was also her third live project in her career and her second released through the Tab label. The album was released exclusively to markets in Scandinavia, notably Sweden.

== Background, content and release ==
Wanda Jackson first became known to audiences through a series of country and Rockabilly music recordings in the 1950s and 1960s. Her most popular singles included "Let's Have a Party" and "The Box It Came In" (all of which were released through Capitol Records). Jackson left Capitol in the 1970s to devote more of her career to gospel music, which she recorded throughout the next decade. By the 1980s, Jackson was at a musical crossroads and felt she was past her prime. Then in 1984, Jackson career made shift back into the Rockabilly circuit when she was asked to record for the Tab label in Sweden. Through the label, she released several albums and toured throughout Europe during the decade.

Among her Tab releases was the live record titled Live in Scandinavia. Jackson had recorded the project in 1984 at the Falkets Falun, a venue in Stockholm, Sweden. The live session was produced by Kenth Larsson. Jackson performed several of her former Rockabilly singles, including "Let's Have a Party", "Fujiyama Mama" and "Mean Mean Man". She sang several of her country singles, including "Right or Wrong" and "In the Middle of a Heartache". Live in Scandinavia was released through Tab records in 1989, becoming her second live release and her second with the label. It was issued as a vinyl LP. In its original form, the album was only available to European markets, notably in Sweden where the Tab company was located. The album was later made available to American markets via digital sites, including Spotify.

== Track listings ==
=== Vinyl version ===
Side one
| No. | Title | Length |
|---|---|---|
| 1. | "Silver Threads" | 2:37 |
| 2. | "In the Middle of a Heartache" | 2:40 |
| 3. | "A Little Bitty Tear" | 1:46 |
| 4. | "Blue Yodel Number Six" | 1:28 |
| 5. | "Jambalaya" | 1:37 |
| 6. | "Honky Tonk Angels" | 1:21 |
| 7. | "Please Release Me" | 1:56 |
| 8. | "Lovesick Blues" | 2:08 |

Side two
| No. | Title | Length |
|---|---|---|
| 1. | "Right or Wrong" | 2:22 |
| 2. | "I Saw the Light" | 3:44 |
| 3. | "Glory Train" | 2:25 |
| 4. | "Mean Mean Man" | 2:04 |
| 5. | "Rockabilly Fever" | 3:47 |
| 6. | "Let's Have a Party" | 3:47 |

=== Digital version ===
Live in Scandinavia
| No. | Title | Length |
|---|---|---|
| 1. | "Silver Threads" | 2:55 |
| 2. | "In the Middle of a Heartache" | 2:48 |
| 3. | "A Little Bitty Tear" | 2:06 |
| 4. | "Blue Yodel Number Six" | 2:06 |
| 5. | "Jambalaya" | 1:46 |
| 6. | "Honky Tonk Angels" | 1:30 |
| 7. | "Please Release Me" | 2:11 |
| 8. | "Lovesick Blues" | 2:27 |
| 9. | "Right or Wrong" | 2:53 |
| 10. | "I Saw the Light" | 3:54 |
| 11. | "Glory Train" | 2:51 |
| 12. | "Mean Mean Man" | 2:20 |
| 13. | "Rockabilly Fever" | 3:58 |
| 14. | "Let's Have a Party" | 3:01 |

== Personnel ==
All credits are adapted from the liner notes of Live in Scandinavia.

Musical and technical personnel

- BA – Lacquer Cut
- Bert Deivert – Acoustic Guitar
- Östen Eriksson – Bass
- Erik Gunnarsson – Drums
- Per Karlsson – Electric Guitar
- Kjell-Åke Körven Eriksson – Fiddle
- Wanda Jackson – Lead vocals
- Kenth Larsson – Producer
- Janne Lindgren – Steel Guitar

== Release history ==
| Region | Date | Format | Label | Ref. |
|---|---|---|---|---|
| Sweden | 1989 | Vinyl | Tab Records | |
| North America | 2010s | Digital download; streaming | Tab Records | |
