= Love Me Forever (Wanda Jackson album) =

Studio album by Wanda Jackson
- Released: May 1963
- Recorded: October – November 1962
- Studios: Bradley Studios, Nashville, Tennessee
- Genres: Country; traditional pop
- Label: Capitol
- Producer: Ken Nelson

Wanda Jackson chronology
Wonderful Wanda (1962)	Love Me Forever (1963)	Two Sides of Wanda (1964)

Love Me Forever is a studio album by American recording artist Wanda Jackson. It was released in May 1963 via Capitol Records and contained 12 tracks. It was Jackson's fifth studio album of her career and the second to included orchestrated production. Love Me Forever was a collection of country and pop music standards composed by other artists. The album received positive reviews from critics following its release.

== Background and content ==
In the 1950s, Wanda Jackson recorded as a rockabilly artist and released singles such as "Fujiyama Mama" and "Let's Have a Party". In 1961, Jackson made the decision to return to country music and placed two singles on the American country chart top ten. Love Me Forever was recorded during Jackson's country transition. The project's liner notes explain that Love Me Forever "demonstrates a country music background and a feelingful style can work on some of the rich and most beautiful of today's romantic ballads."

Love Me Forever contained a total of 12 tracks. Unlike other Jackson releases, the album contained recordings composed by other songwriters including Bill Anderson, Willie Nelson and Hank Williams. All of the album tracks were cover versions of songs first cut by different artists. Among these songs "Little Things Mean a Lot", "May You Never Be Alone" and "Pledging My Love". Love Me Forever was recorded in sessions held at the Bradley Studios in Nashville, Tennessee between October and November 1962. The album was produced by Ken Nelson and featured orchestrated string arrangements by Bill McElhiney.

== Release and reception ==
Love Me Forever was released in May 1963 on Capitol Records. It was the fifth studio album issued in Jackson's career and the fifth to be released with Capitol. The project was originally issued as a vinyl LP, containing six songs on either side of the record. In later years, the album was released with an identical track listing to digital and streaming markets, including Apple Music. The project received a positive response from music critics and writers. In June 1963, Billboard magazine praised Jackson's vocals and the string arrangements set by Bill McElhiney: "Miss Jackson is in great form on this, her newest outing, and for a change, she's in almost strictly pop setting, with handsome arrangements for strings and voices by Bill McElhiney." Authors Mary Bufwack and Robert K. Oermann described Love Me Forever as "a fine album of orchestrated standards".

== Track listings ==
Side one
No.	Title	Writer(s)	Length
1.	"Please Love Me Forever"	Ollie Blanchard; John Malone	2:29
2.	"Funny How Time Slips Away"	Willie Nelson	2:46
3.	"Since I Met You Baby"	Ivory Joe Hunter	2:39
4.	"Pledging My Love"	Don Robey; Ferdinand Washington	2:35
5.	"The Things I Might Have Been"	Richard M. Sherman; Robert B. Sherman	2:30
6.	"May You Never Be Alone"	Hank Williams	2:44

Side two
No.	Title	Writer(s)	Length
1.	"How Important Can It Be?"	Bennie Benjamin; George David Weiss	2:40
2.	"I May Never Get to Heaven"	Bill Anderson; Buddy Killen	2:35
3.	"Little Things Mean a Lot"	Edith Lindeman; Carl Stutz	3:10
4.	"What Am I Living For"	Art Harris; Fred Jay	2:40
5.	"Empty Arms"	Hunter	2:21
6.	"Have You Ever Been Lonely"	George Brown; Peter DeRose	2:05

== Release history ==
Region	Date	Format	Label	Ref.
Germany	May 1963	Vinyl	Capitol Records	
Japan	May 1963	Vinyl	Capitol Records	
Canada; United States	May 1963	Vinyl	Capitol Records	
Canada; United States	2010s	Digital; Streaming	Capitol Records Nashville	
