= The Many Moods of Wanda Jackson =

Studio album by Wanda Jackson
- Released: December 1968
- Recorded: 1967 – 1968
- Studio: Columbia Studio
- Genre: Country
- Label: Capitol
- Producers: Kelso Herston; Ken Nelson

Wanda Jackson chronology
Cream of the Crop (1968)	The Many Moods of Wanda Jackson (1968)	The Happy Side of Wanda (1969)

Singles from The Many Moods of Wanda Jackson
- 1. "I Wish I Was Your Friend" Released: October 1968; 2. "If I Had a Hammer" Released: January 1969

The Many Moods of Wanda Jackson is a studio album by American recording artist Wanda Jackson. It was released in December 1968 via Capitol Records and contained 11 tracks. The project was Jackson's thirteenth studio album in her career and spawned two singles. Both "I Wish I Was Your Friend" and "If I Had a Hammer" reached charting positions on the American country chart. The album itself also reached charting positions in the United States.

== Background and content ==
In the 1950s, Wanda Jackson made a series of Rockabilly recordings, several of which became successful like "Fujiyama Mama" and "Let's Have a Party". She transitioned back to her country music roots after the success of the songs "Right or Wrong" and "In the Middle of a Heartache". Jackson recorded more country selections during the decade and became more identified with the genre. The Many Moods of Wanda Jackson was one of the albums Jackson recorded exclusively for the country audience. The album was recorded in sessions held at the Columbia Recording Studio in Nashville, Tennessee between 1967 and 1968. The tracks were co-produced by Kelso Herston and Ken Nelson. It was Jackson's second album to include co-production credits from Herston.

The Many Moods of Wanda Jackson consisted of 11 tracks, all of which were composed by other songwriters. According to the album's liner notes, the project was intended to showcase Jackson's "personality most clearly", through different selections that showcased her various musical interests. Included were covers of pop and country songs

== Release and critical reception ==
The Many Moods of Wanda Jackson was released in December 1968, making it Jackson's thirteenth studio album. It was originally issued as a vinyl LP, containing six songs on "side one" and five songs on "side two". It was later re-released via Capitol Records Nashville to digital and streaming markets, including Apple Music. The LP spent six weeks on the Billboard Top Country Albums survey, peaking at number 28 in March 1969. It was her seventh album to reach a peak position on the chart. Although a full review was not given, AllMusic did name "I Wish I Was Your Friend", "I'd Do It All Over Again" and "Walk Right Out on My Mind" as "album picks".

== Singles ==
Two singles were spawned from the album. In October 1968, "I Wish I Was Your Friend" was released as the album's first single. In January 1969, the single peaked at number 51 on the Billboard Hot Country Singles chart. Jackson's cover of "If I Had a Hammer" was spawned as the project's second single in January 1969. The song peaked outside of the country top 40, climbing to number 41 on the Billboard country songs chart in April 1969.

== Track listings ==
Side one
No.	Title	Writer(s)	Length
1.	"I Wish I Was Your Friend"	Harlan Howard	2:30
2.	"Walk Right In"	Teddy Powell; Billy Dawn Smith	2:26
3.	"Memphis, Tennessee"	Chuck Berry	2:10
4.	"I'd Do It All Over Again"	Ron Mason	2:27
5.	"If I Had a Hammer"	Lee Hays; Pete Seeger	2:37
6.	"I'm a Believer"	Neil Diamond	2:43

Side two
No.	Title	Writer(s)	Length
1.	"I Started Loving You Again"	Merle Haggard	2:15
2.	"Fever"	Eddie Cooley; John Davenport	3:10
3.	"Poor Ole Me"	Jerry Venable	2:30
4.	"Walk Right Out of My Mind"	Red Lane	2:30
5.	"Big Daddy"	John D. Loudermilk	1:59

== Chart performance ==
Chart (1968 – 1969)	Peak position
US Top Country Albums (Billboard)	28

== Release history ==
Region	Date	Format	Label	Ref.
Canada	December 1968	Vinyl	Capitol Records	
Australia; United States	December 1968	Vinyl	Capitol Records	
Germany	December 1968	Vinyl	Capitol Records	
United States	2010s	Digital; Streaming	Capitol Records Nashville	
