= Mean Mean Man =

Single by Wanda Jackson
- B-side: "(Every Time They Play) Our Song" (1958) "Happy, Happy Birthday Baby" (1960)
- Released: August 1958 (original); November 1960 (re-release)
- Recorded: April 1958
- Studio: Capitol Studios
- Genre: Rockabilly; rock and roll
- Length: 2:10
- Label: Capitol
- Songwriter: Wanda Jackson
- Producer: Ken Nelson

Wanda Jackson (1958) singles chronology
"Honey Bop" (1958)	"Mean Mean Man" (1958)	"Rock Your Baby" (1958)

Wanda Jackson (1960) singles chronology
"Let's Have a Party" (1960)	"Mean Mean Man" (1960)	"Little Charm Bracelet" (1961)

"Mean Mean Man" is a song written and originally recorded by American singer, Wanda Jackson. It was an example of her earliest rock and roll recordings and was first released as a single in 1958 with no success. It was then re-released in 1960 to international markets, where it made the top-40 in Australia and the United Kingdom. Since its release, the song has been acclaimed by critics for its Rockabilly structure and Jackson's vocal performance.

== Background and composition ==
Wanda Jackson found success as a singer in the country and gospel fields, but most notably is remembered for her rock and roll recordings. She began her career as a teenage country singer with the 1954 US top-10 country hit, "You Can't Have My Love". After switching from Decca to Capitol, Jackson toured with then up-and-coming Elvis Presley, who encouraged her to sing rock and roll/rockabilly. She then began recording this material, having success in Japan with the 1958 single "Fujiyama Mama".

Although Jackson recorded rock material, she had a difficult time finding songs that were tailored for women to sing. "I wanted to sing and I didn't have a lot of choices, so a lot of time it was better than I just wrote it. 'Mean Mean Man' was one of those." Jackson later stated. Jackson decided on the song's concept after a conversation with her father who suggested to "write a song about a guy who treats you bad".

== Recording ==
"Mean Mean Man" was recorded in April 1958 at Capitol Studios, located in Hollywood, California and the session was produced by Ken Nelson. Four additional tracks were cut at the same recording session: "Rock Your Baby", "A Date with Jerry", "(Every Time They Play) Our Song" and "You've Turned to a Stranger". Jackson was known on her rock records for incorporating a vocal growl and "Mean Mean Man" was among the earliest examples of its usage. Jackson's growl also stemmed from her father, who encouraged it after Ken Nelson disliked a rock performance she attempted in the studio. "Pay no attention to Ken, just rear back and sing this song the way you feel it," her father said.

== Critical reception ==
Cash Box reviewed the original 1958 single in its "Country Reviews" section and gave it a B+, calling it "a torrid, all-market rock ’n roller that the thrush drives out in coin-catching fashion." Billboard reviewed the 1960 re-release and compared its style to that of 1960's "Let's Have a Party". Billy Poore, author of the book Rockabilly: A 40 Year Journey, named it "one of the finest examples of female rockabilly music" while Alexis Petridis of The Guardian said the tune "still sound[s] extraordinary 60 years later" in a 2021 article.

== Releases and chart performance ==
"Mean Mean Man" was originally released as a single by Capitol Records in August 1958 and was distributed as a seven-inch vinyl disc. It included the B-side called "(Every Time They Play) Our Song". Like many of Jackson's 1950s rockabilly songs, "Mean Mean Man" failed to become a hit after its original release. In her autobiography, Jackson found this period of her career to be "a commercial dry spell" and recollected that Capitol put little investment in her singles in belief she would not sell many records. However, "Let's Have a Party" became a hit for Jackson in 1960, prompting "Mean Mean Man" to be re-released to international markets. European Capitol manager, Cees Hunderpool, believed the song "was going to be a hit" when discussing it with Cash Box in 1961. The song was re-released by Capitol in November 1960 and was backed by a different B-side: a cover of "Happy, Happy Birthday Baby". The reissue made the top-40 on the Australian Kent Music Report chart, rising to number 33. It also reached number 40 on the UK Singles Chart.

== Track listings ==
7" vinyl single (original) – (1958)

- "Mean Mean Man"
- "(Every Time They Play) Our Song"

7" vinyl single (re-release) – (1960)

- "Mean Mean Man" – 2:10
- "Happy, Happy Birthday Baby" – 2:35

== Chart performance ==
Chart (1961)	Peak position
Australia (Kent Music Report)	33
UK Singles (Official Charts)	40
