= Two Sides of Wanda =

Studio album by Wanda Jackson
- Released: March 1964
- Recorded: July 1963
- Studio: Columbia Studio
- Genres: Rockabilly; country
- Label: Capitol
- Producer: Ken Nelson

Wanda Jackson chronology
Love Me Forever (1963)	Two Sides of Wanda (1964)	Blues in My Heart (1964)

Singles from Two Sides of Wanda
- 1. "Candy Man" Released: October 1964

Two Sides of Wanda is a studio album by American recording artist Wanda Jackson. It was released in March 1964 via Capitol Records and contained 12 tracks. It was the sixth studio release of Jackson's career; side one contained rockabilly performances, while side two featured country music selections. The album received a nomination from the Grammy Awards following its release and has since been re-released.

== Background and content ==
In the 1950s, Wanda Jackson became known for her rockabilly selections, some of which became successful like "Fujiyama Mama" and "Let's Have a Party". In 1961, she returned her country music roots. That year she had two top ten country hits with "Right or Wrong" and "In the Middle of a Heartache". Thus, her career shifted back to the genre for the remainder of the decade. Two Sides of Wanda was intended to focus on both her musical identities by putting rock on one side and country on the other side of the record.

The album included a total of 12 selections. All of the songs were cover versions of songs first recorded by other artists. According to Jackson, she chose several songs for the album from artists she admired or befriended. Among these songs was "Honey Don't", a Rockabilly track originally by Carl Perkins. Other Rockabilly cuts included Whole Lotta Shakin' Goin' On" and "Rip It Up". Among the country selections chosen were "Making Believe" and Hank Williams' "Cold, Cold Heart". The album was recorded in July 1963 at the Columbia Studio, located in Nashville, Tennessee. The sessions were produced by Ken Nelson.

== Release and critical reception ==
Professional ratings
Review scores
Source	Rating
Record Mirror	3/5 stars

Two Sides of Wanda was released in March 1964 on Capitol Records. It marked Jackson's sixth studio album released in her career. The project was originally distributed as a vinyl LP, containing six songs on both sides of the record. In later years, it was re-released with the same track listing to digital and streaming markets, which included Apple Music. Although the album did not receive a formal review by AllMusic, the website did name both "Whole Lotta Shakin' Goin' On" and "Cold, Cold Heart" as their "album picks" for the LP. The album also received a nomination for Best Female Country Vocal Performance at the 7th Annual Grammy Awards. It was Jackson's first nomination from the Grammy's. The project also spawned one single release. In October 1964, "Candy Man" was issued as a single via Capitol Records.

== Track listing ==
Side one
No.	Title	Writer(s)	Length
1.	"Whole Lotta Shakin' Goin' On"	S. David; Dave "Curlee" Williams	2:42
2.	"Honey Don't"	Carl Perkins	2:11
3.	"Yakety Yak"	Jerry Leiber and Mike Stoller	2:10
4.	"Searchin'"	Leiber-Stoller	2:51
5.	"Candy Man"	Fred Neil; Beverly Ross	2:37
6.	"Rip It Up"	Robert Blackwell; John Marascalco	2:14

Side two
No.	Title	Writer(s)	Length
1.	"Making Believe"	Jimmy Work	2:32
2.	"The Keeper of the Key"	Kenny Devine; Lenny Guyness; Harlan Howard; Beverly Stewart	3:25
3.	"Don't Let Me Cross Over"	Penny Jay	2:55
4.	"Cold, Cold Heart"	Hank Williams	2:34
5.	"Don't Worry"	Marty Robbins	3:40
6.	"Please Help Me, I'm Falling"	Hal Blair; Don Robertson	2:23

== Personnel ==
All credits are adapted from the liner notes of Two Sides of Wanda.

- George German – Photography
- Ken Nelson – Producer

== Release history ==
Region	Date	Format	Label	Ref.
Germany; United Kingdom	March 1964	Vinyl	Capitol Records	
Canada; United States	March 1964	Vinyl	Capitol Records	
Canada; United States	2010s	Digital; Streaming	Capitol Records Nashville	
