= Cash on the Barrelhead =

Song by The Louvin Brothers
- B-side: "You're Running Wild"
- Released: August 1956
- Recorded: May 4, 1956
- Genre: Country
- Length: 2:46
- Label: Columbia
- Songwriter(s): Ira Louvin and Charlie Louvin

"Cash on the Barrelhead" is a song written by Charlie and Ira Louvin, known professionally as the Louvin Brothers, which was first recorded and released in 1956 as the B-side of "You're Running Wild". The single came at a high point in the Louvins' career, and the song's rollicking honky-tonk feel has led it to be frequently covered both in recordings and live performances.

== Song premise ==
The song plays on the popular expression "cash on the barrelhead" implying that immediate payment is demanded. The expression apparently derives from the custom of using barrel tops as ersatz tables in bars. In such circumstances, "customers were required to pay for their drinks immediately, literally putting their money on the top (head) of a barrel."

The song tells a picaresque tale of an unfortunate rogue facing jail time or a fine for "getting in a little trouble at the county seat". Unable to raise the funds, he spends "thirty days in the jailhouse." His financial woes continue to bedevil him, leaving him unable to make a call from jail and finally unable to pay his bus fare home when released.

== Personnel ==
- Ira Louvin: vocals, mandolin
- Charlie Louvin: vocals, guitar
- Don Helms: steel guitar
- Paul Yandell: lead guitar
- George McCormick: rhythm guitar
- Floyd Chance: bass
- Buddy Harman: drums

== Versions ==
In 1966 Bobby Lord cut the song as a single.

In 1973 Ronnie Sessions recorded the song as a single and it hit a 72 on the Country charts.

Gram Parsons recorded the song with backing vocals by Emmylou Harris for his 1974 album Grievous Angel, as part of the "Medley Live from Northern Quebec", along with the song "Hickory Wind". This rendition is noteworthy for the sparkling country guitar work of Elvis sideman James Burton.

Don McCalister, Jr from Austin, Texas covered the song on his 1993 album Brand New Ways.

In 1996, Charlie Louvin re-recorded the song on his album, Longest Train. The album was produced by Julian Dawson and included backup vocals and rhythm guitar by Barry and Holly Tashian and this version of the song included a noticeably spectacular rockabilly backing guitar part by Steuart Smith who has worked extensively with Eagles.

The Colorado-based, "Polyethnic Cajun Slamgrass" band Leftover Salmon offered a rollicking cover of the song on their 1997 release Euphoria.

The Balham Alligators led by Geraint Watkins covered the song on their Gateway to the South album.

Dolly Parton covered the song on her traditionally themed 1999 album The Grass Is Blue.

The "Queen of Rockabilly" Wanda Jackson offered a recording of the tune on Heart Trouble in 2003, dominated by a rockabilly lead guitar.

Joe Nichols and Rhonda Vincent covered the song for the tribute album Livin', Lovin', Losin': Songs of the Louvin Brothers in 2003. Despite the traditional instrumentation (mandolin and fiddle), this version has a distinctly commercial country production feel, highlighted by Nichols's lead vocal.

The Brooklyn-based producer and performer Rench offered what might be termed a Gangstagrass reinterpretation of the song with banjo and turntable distortion in 2006.

Anders Drerup and Kelly Prescott offered a loving tribute to the Gram Parsons-Emmylou Harris rendition of the song in the musical theatre production Grievous Angel: The Legend of Gram Parsons in 2009.

In 2016, Alison Krauss performed the song as part of a tribute concert/album to Emmylou Harris.

On March 27, 2020, Bob Dylan released the lead single for his album Rough and Rowdy Ways, through Columbia Records, titled "Murder Most Foul". The lyrics contain the line, "Cash on the barrelhead, money to burn. Dealey Plaza, make a left hand turn", alluding to the motive of the killing of the United States President John F. Kennedy in 1963.

- 1995 - John Greene, Gone West
