= The Happy Side of Wanda =

Studio album by Wanda Jackson
- Released: July 1969
- Recorded: December 1967 – March 1969
- Studio: Columbia Studio
- Genre: Country
- Label: Capitol
- Producers: Kelso Herston; Ken Nelson

Wanda Jackson chronology
The Many Moods of Wanda Jackson (1968)	The Happy Side of Wanda (1969)	Wanda Jackson in Person (1969)

Singles from The Happy Side of Wanda
- 1. "Your Tender Love" Released: April 1969

The Happy Side of Wanda is a studio album by American recording artist Wanda Jackson. It was released in July 1969 via Capitol Records and contained 11 tracks. It was Jackson's fourteenth studio record released in her career and the fourteenth released on the Capitol label. The project included one single release titled "Your Tender Love".

== Background and content ==
In the 1960s, Wanda Jackson made the successful transition from Rockabilly to Country music with two chart hits: "Right or Wrong" and "In the Middle of a Heartache". She became more identified with the Country genre throughout the decade with further album and single releases. In the mid-1960s, she had further country chart singles with "The Box It Came In" and "Tears Will Be the Chaser for Your Wine". The Happy Side of Wanda was among the studio releases that followed and was also targeted towards the country market. The project was produced by Kelso Herston and Ken Nelson. It was the third album co-produced by Herston. It was recorded between December 1967 and March 1969 at the Columbia Studio.

According to the liner notes, The Happy Side of Wanda was a concept album made to showcase songs about positivity and happiness: "In short, here's the really outstanding results of the great Wanda Jackson joining forces with a state of mind and actuality called happiness," it concludes. A total of 11 tracks comprised the project. "Your Tender Love" was composed by Jackson herself. Also included are cover versions of songs that evoked positive themes. Jackson covers Gale Garnett's "We'll Sing in the Sunshine", Buck Owens' "Love's Gonna Live Here", Woody Guthrie's "This Land Is Your Land", Bobby Darin's "You're the Reason I'm Living" and Glen Campbell's "Less of Me".

== Release and singles ==
The Happy Side of Wanda was originally released in July 1969 on Capitol Records. It was Jackson's fourteenth studio album issued in her career and her fourteenth with Capitol. It was originally distributed as a vinyl LP, containing six songs on "side one" and five songs on "side two". In later decades the album was re-released on Capitol Records Nashville to digital and streaming markets, which included Apple Music. Billboard named the original LP among its "popular new album releases" in their July 1969 issue of the magazine. The project included one single, which was "Your Tender Love". It was released as a single via Capitol Records in April 1969.

== Track listings ==
Side one
No.	Title	Writer(s)	Length
1.	"We'll Sing in the Sunshine"	Gale Garnett	2:57
2.	"Yours Love"	Harlan Howard	2:19
3.	"Less of Me"	Glen Campbell	2:04
4.	"You're the Reason I'm Living"	Bobby Darin	2:18
5.	"He's Got the Whole World in His Hands"	Traditional	2:00
6.	"As the Day Wears On"	Vincent Matthews	2:30

Side two
No.	Title	Writer(s)	Length
1.	"Love's Gonna Live Here"	Buck Owens	2:01
2.	"Your Tender Love"	Wanda Jackson	2:07
3.	"Please Don't Sell My Daddy No More Wine"	Tom Lane	2:43
4.	"You'll Always Have My Love"	Yvonne DeVaney	2:39
5.	"This Land Is Your Land"	Woody Guthrie	2:25

== Release history ==
Region	Date	Format	Label	Ref.
United States	July 1969	Vinyl	Capitol Records	
Australia	1973	Vinyl	World Record Club	
Australia	1973	Cassette	World Cassette Club	
United States	2010s	Digital; Streaming	Capitol Records Nashville	
