= I'll Still Love You (album) =

Compilation album by Wanda Jackson
- Released: 1976
- Recorded: 1973 – 1975
- Studio: Jack Clement Studio
- Genre: Country
- Label: DJM
- Producer: Billy Ray Hearn

Wanda Jackson chronology
| Make Me Like a Child Again (1976) | I'll Still Love You (1976) | Closer to Jesus (1977) |

Singles from I'll Still Love You
- 1. "Where Do I Put His Memory" Released: 1974; 2. "I Can't Stand to Hear You Say Goodbye" Released: 1975; 3. "I'll Still Love You" Released: 1976

I'll Still Love You is a compilation album by American recording artist Wanda Jackson. It was released in 1976 via DJM Records and contained a total of ten tracks. The album compiled previously released country recordings, some of which were released as singles. Other tracks were released only on studio albums. The project was issued outside of the United States.

== Background, content and release ==
Wanda Jackson previously had commercial success with a series of charting Rockabilly and country singles. Songs like "Let's Have a Party", "In the Middle of a Heartache" and "The Box It Came In" had reached both the country and pop charts. Once discovering Christianity in 1971, Jackson chose to focus more on gospel music and signed with Word Records in 1973. The label also allowed her to record country material, which was also released during the same period. I'll Still Love You compiled Jackson's previously released country recordings. The songs were recorded between 1973 and 1975 at the Jack Clement Studio in sessions held by producer Billy Ray Hearn.

I'll Still Love You consisted of ten tracks. Some of the album's material had previously been released on Jackson's studio albums. Jackson's covers of "Slippin' Away", "Everybody's Had the Blues" and "Snowbird" first appeared on the 1974 studio album When It's Time to Fall in Love Again. "Jesus Put a Yodel in My Soul" had first appeared on her 1975 studio album Now I Have Everything.

== Release and singles ==
I'll Still Love You was released in 1976 on DJM Records, a British independent record label. The record was released outside North America. It was issued as a vinyl LP, with five songs on each side of the disc. It marked Jackson's first DJM album release and her twelfth compilation album release overall. Prior to the record's release and following its release, a series of singles were issued that not previously been included on any of Jackson's studio albums. In 1974, "Where Do I Put His Memory" was released as a single via Myrrh Records but was not included on an album until I'll Still Love You. This was followed in similar fashion by 1975's "I Can't Stand to Hear You Say Goodbye", which was first released on ABC Records. The album's title track was released as a single around the same time as the album's release in 1976.

== Track listing ==
Side one
| No. | Title | Writer(s) | Length |
|---|---|---|---|
| 1. | "I'll Still Love You" | Jim Weatherly | 2:09 |
| 2. | "My Umbrella" | Wanda Jackson | 2:54 |
| 3. | "Teardrop No. 1" | Yvonne DeVaney | 2:30 |
| 4. | "Everybody's Had the Blues" | Merle Haggard | 2:58 |
| 5. | "Slippin' Away" | Bill Anderson | 2:33 |

Side two
| No. | Title | Writer(s) | Length |
|---|---|---|---|
| 1. | "Jesus Put a Yodel in My Soul" | Jackson; Esther Pooler | 2:05 |
| 2. | "Where Do I Put His Memory" | Weatherly | 3:39 |
| 3. | "Funny Face" | Donna Fargo | 2:57 |
| 4. | "Take a Look" | Devaney | 2:53 |
| 5. | "I Can't Stand to Hear You Say Goodbye" | Ray Pennington | 2:42 |

== Personnel ==
All credits are adapted from the liner notes of I'll Still Love You.

Musical personnel

- Joseph Babcock – Background vocals
- Jerry Carrigan – Drums
- Ray Edenton – Guitar
- Dolores Edgin – Background vocals
- Wanda Jackson – Lead vocals
- Weldon Myrick – Steel guitar
- June Page – Background vocals
- Billy Sanford – Guitar
- Jerry Shook – Guitar
- Jerry Smith – Piano
- Henry Strzelecki – Bass
- Bergen White – Background vocals
- Jack Williams – Guitar
- Hurshel Winginton – Background vocals

Technical personnel

- Billy Ray Hearn – Producer
- Farrell Morris – Percussion
- Charlie Tallent – Engineer

== Release history ==
| Region | Date | Format | Label | Ref. |
|---|---|---|---|---|
| United Kingdom | 1976 | Vinyl | DJM Records | |
| Scandinavia | 1976 | Vinyl | Myrrh Records | |
