= How Important Can It Be? =

1955 song by Bennie Benjamin and George David Weiss

Song
- Published: 1955
- Genre: Traditional pop
- Songwriters: Bennie Benjamin; George David Weiss

"How Important Can It Be?" is a popular song written by Bennie Benjamin and George David Weiss, and published in 1955.

== Background ==
The lyrics of the song find the narrator asking her lover why her indiscretions with other boyfriends before him matter at all, now that she loves him so and vows to be true to him.

== Joni James recording ==
It was popularized in 1955 by Joni James. The song was first presented to James by the music publisher Tommy Valando, according to her international fan club president Wayne Brasler of the University of Chicago Laboratory Schools. James recorded it at her first session in New York City, after moving from her hometown of Chicago, with arranger David Terry. However, after listening to the playback she and her career director and future husband Tony Acquaviva felt, in her words, "something was missing." She came up with the idea of a shuffle beat and male chorus in the style of The Four Aces, and she re-made the song at her next session. When released as a single in 1955, it reached No. 2 in the Billboard charts during a 16-week stay and became a gold record. Joni James re-recorded the song in 2009 on her album, Essential Masters.

== Other recordings ==
- There was also a successful recording of this song by Sarah Vaughan in 1955 which reached the No. 12 position in the Billboard charts. The Vaughan version was just about to come out when James recorded her second version, which MGM Records rush-released.
- Teresa Brewer's recording the same year was popular too.
- Bing Crosby recorded the song in 1955 for use on his radio show and it was subsequently included in the box set The Bing Crosby CBS Radio Recordings (1954-56) issued by Mosaic Records (catalog MD7-245) in 2009.
- Dick James - a single release in 1955.
- Lou Monte also recorded the song in 1956.
- Wanda Jackson - included in her album Love Me Forever (1963).

== Popular culture ==
- The 1950s version by Joni James was used in the Academy Award-winning motion picture, LA Confidential.
