= Wanda Jackson in Person =

Live album by Wanda Jackson
- Released: October 1969
- Recorded: July 1969
- Venue: Mr. Lucky's
- Genre: Country
- Label: Capitol
- Producer: Ken Nelson

Wanda Jackson chronology
The Happy Side of Wanda (1969)	Wanda Jackson in Person (1969)	Wanda Jackson Country! (1970)

Wanda Jackson in Person is a live album by American recording artist Wanda Jackson. It was released in October 1969 via Capitol Records and contained ten tracks. The project was Jackson's first live album in her career and was recorded at Mr. Lucky's, a performance venue in Phoenix, Arizona.

== Background ==
In the 1950s, Wanda Jackson released a series of Rockabilly recordings before transitioning into the Country genre during the 1960s, where she had commercial success. As the decade progressed, Jackson recorded more country material and became further identified with the genre. Jackson and her producer, Ken Nelson, decided to record her first live album after deciding that she needed to attempt other musical projects. Two dates were set for the recording of the project at Mr. Lucky's, a performance venue located in Phoenix, Arizona, where she "always had great crowds", according to Jackson's autobiography.

== Recording, content and release ==
For the recording process, Jackson used her touring band but also brought in Nashville session musicians Willie Ackerman and Fred Carter Jr. The official sessions took place in July 1969 at Mr. Lucky's under Nelson's production. A total of ten tracks were chosen for the live recording, which included Jackson's self-penned hit "Right or Wrong". Other songs chosen included her Rockabilly single "Let's Have a Party", along with her country single "If I Had a Hammer". She also performed several covers, including Tammy Wynette's "Divorce", along with Johnny Cash and June Carter's "Jackson". Wanda Jackson in Person was released in October 1969 on Capitol Records as a vinyl LP. In later decades, the album was re-released to digital and streaming markets, including Apple Music.

== Track listings ==
Side one
No.	Title	Writer(s)	Length
1.	"Let's Have a Party"	Jessie May Robinson	1:36
2.	"Jackson"	Gaby Rogers; Billy Ed Wheeler	2:26
3.	"Right or Wrong"	Wanda Jackson	2:22
4.	"Release Me"	Eddie Miller; W.S. Stevenson	2:50
5.	"If I Had a Hammer"	Lee Hays; Pete Seeger	3:32

Side two
No.	Title	Writer(s)	Length
1.	"Silver Threads and Golden Needles"	Dick Reynolds; Jack Rhodes	2:35
2.	"D-i-v-o-r-c-e"	Bobby Braddock; Curly Putman	2:32
3.	"Hold Me Tight"	Johnny Nash	1:56
4.	"Games People Play"	Joe South	2:38
5.	"Cowboy Yodel"	Carson J. Robinson	1:57

== Personnel ==
All credits are adapted from the liner notes of Wanda Jackson in Person.

Musical personnel

- Willie Ackerman – Drums
- Earl Ball – Piano
- Fred Carter Jr. – Electric guitar
- Wanda Jackson – Lead vocals
- Billy Linneman – Bass
- Stanley Oscarson – Steel guitar
- Billy Williams – Rhythm guitar

Technical personnel

- Hugh Davies – Engineer
- Ken Nelson – Producer

== Release history ==
Region	Date	Format	Label	Ref.
United States; Canada	October 1969	Vinyl	Capitol Records	
Germany	October 1969	Vinyl	Capitol Records	
Japan	October 1969	Vinyl	Capitol Records	
Sweden	October 1969	Vinyl	Capitol Records	
Australia	1973	Vinyl	World Record Club	
Sweden	1984	Cassette	Capitol Records	
United States	2010s	Digital; Streaming	Capitol Records Nashville	
