= Rockabilly Fever =

Studio album by Wanda Jackson
- Released: 1984
- Recorded: September 1984
- Studio: Music Mill Recording Studio
- Genre: Rockabilly
- Label: Tab
- Producer: Kenth Larsson

Wanda Jackson chronology
| My Kind of Gospel (1983) | Rockabilly Fever (1984) | Teach Me to Love (1984) |

Rock and Roll Away Your Blues

Singles from Rockabilly Fever
- 1. "Meet Me in Stockholm" Released: 1985

Rockabilly Fever is a studio album by American recording artist Wanda Jackson. It was released in 1984 via Tab Records for the Scandinavian market in Europe. It was then re-released to other markets, including Jackson's home country in 1986 and was re-titled Rock and Roll Away Your Blues.

The album was Jackson's thirtieth in her career and her first to contain rockabilly recordings in several decades. One single was released from the record in 1985 and the album received positive reviews from critics.

== Background ==
Early in her career, Wanda Jackson became one of the first women to record Rockabilly (later known as rock and roll) and country music. She achieved commercial success in both fields with singles like "Fujiyama Mama", "Let's Have a Party", "Right or Wrong" and "The Box It Came In". She left her long-time record label in the 1970s to pursue gospel music and only occasionally performed secular concerts. In the 1980s, Rockabilly revived in Europe and Jackson's music from that era gained renewed interest from fans. In her autobiography, Jackson recalled receiving a phone call from Swedish businessman Harry Holmes in summer 1984. Holmes had started a record label and invited Jackson to record a rock album for him. With careful consideration Jackson and her husband agreed.

== Recording and songs ==
In September 1984, Jackson traveled to Kumla, Sweden to record what would become Rockabilly Fever. The project was produced by Swedish record producer Kenth Larsson at the Music Mill Recording Studio in Kumla alongside entirely Swedish session musicians. She described the session musicians in her 2017 book as "Swedish rockabilly fanatics". She also recalled a pleasant surprise to record not only Rockabilly music, but also gospel music.

A total of 12 tracks comprised the original album, most of which were Rockabilly numbers. Jackson recorded mostly covers of previously successful Rockabilly songs by other performers. Included was her version of Connie Francis' "Stupid Cupid", Brenda Lee's "Sweet Nothin's", The Crickets's "Oh, Boy!" and "Rave On", Jerry Lee Lewis' "Breathless" and Conway Twitty's "It's Only Make Believe". The latter tracks had actually been first recorded by Jackson for her 1982 album, but were re-recorded for Rockabilly Fever. Also included were several new cuts, including "Rock and Roll Away Your Blues", "Meet Me in Stockholm", "Sad Love Songs" and the gospel track "Ain't It the Gospel".

== Release and reception ==
Professional ratings
Review scores
| Source | Rating |
|---|---|
| AllMusic | 3/5 stars |

Rockabilly Fever was originally released in 1984 on Tab Records exclusively for the Scandinavian market. It was originally issued as a vinyl LP, containing six songs on either side of the record. The album was Jackson's thirtieth studio record in her career. In 1985, it was released under the same title in the United Kingdom but instead under the label Magnum Force Records. The release was also issued as a vinyl LP with an identical track listing. In 1986, it was re-released for the American market under the Varrick label with 11 tracks instead of 12 ("Meet Me in Stockholm" was omitted). It was also issued as a vinyl LP, but had a different album cover than the original. In later decades, Rockabilly Fever was reissued as to digital and streaming markets. The American version received a three-star rating from AllMusic in later years. In addition, it received a positive response from writers Mary Bufwack and Robert K. Oermann who called the album "Rockabilly fire" in their 2003 book. The original Scandinavian release spawned one single in 1985, which was "Meet Me in Stockholm". The song was backed on the B-side by the track "If I Could Take Sweden Home".

== Track listing ==
=== Rockabilly Fever ===
Side one
| No. | Title | Writer(s) | Length |
|---|---|---|---|
| 1. | "Rock-A-Billy Fever" | Carl Perkins | 4:07 |
| 2. | "Stupid Cupid" | Howard Greenfield; Neil Sedaka | 2:07 |
| 3. | "Rock 'n' Roll Away Your Blues" | Ronald Brashear | 2:27 |
| 4. | "Sweet Nuthin's" | Ronnie Self | 2:27 |
| 5. | "It's Only Make Believe" | Jack Nance; Conway Twitty | 2:25 |
| 6. | "Oh Boy" | Norman Petty; Bill Tilghman; Sonny West | 2:14 |

Side two
| No. | Title | Writer(s) | Length |
|---|---|---|---|
| 1. | "Rock-a-Billy Hound Dog" | Brashear | 2:44 |
| 2. | "Breathless" | Otis Blackwell | 3:00 |
| 3. | "Sad Love Songs" | Brashear | 2:27 |
| 4. | "Rave On" | Petty; Tilgman; West | 1:53 |
| 5. | "Meet Me in Stockholm" | Doug Sahm | 3:23 |
| 6. | "Ain't It the Gospel" | George Gagliardi | 2:31 |

=== Rock 'n' Roll Away Your Blues ===
Side one
| No. | Title | Writer(s) | Length |
|---|---|---|---|
| 1. | "Breathless" | Blackwell | 3:00 |
| 2. | "Rock-A-Billy Fever" | Perkins | 4:07 |
| 3. | "Sweet Nuthin's" | Self | 2:27 |
| 4. | "It's Only Make Believe" | Nance; Twitty | 2:25 |
| 5. | "Oh Boy" | Petty; Tilghman; West | 2:14 |

Side two
| No. | Title | Writer(s) | Length |
|---|---|---|---|
| 1. | "Rave On" | Petty; Tilgman; West | 1:53 |
| 2. | "Rock 'n' Roll Away Your Blues" | Brashear | 2:27 |
| 3. | "Sad Love Songs" | Brashear | 2:27 |
| 4. | "RockaBilly Hound Dog" | Brashear | 2:44 |
| 5. | "Stupid Cupid" | Greenfield; Sedaka | 2:07 |
| 6. | "Ain't It the Gospel" | Gagliardi | 2:31 |

== Personnel ==
All credits are adapted from the liner notes of Rockabilly Fever and Rock 'n' Roll Away Your Blues.

Musical personnel

- Per-Olof Ahslund – Electric guitar
- Bjorn Alriksson – Harmonica
- Stephan Berg – Piano, keyboards
- Östen Eriksson – Double bass
- Sven-Inge Neander – Bass
- Wanda Jackson – Lead vocals
- Per Erik Jonsson – Piano
- Kenth Larsson – Steel guitar
- Benny Lawin – Saxophone
- Gunnar Norsten – Drums
- Christer Olund – Accordion
- Bert Östlund – Piano
- Ann Persson – Acoustic guitar

Technical personnel

- Joann Bodenweber – Design
- Mary Bufwack – Liner notes (1986 version)
- Kenth Larsson – Producer
- Thomas Ljungqvist – Photography

== Release history ==
| Region | Date | Format | Label | Ref. |
|---|---|---|---|---|
| Sweden | 1984 | Vinyl | Tab Records | |
| United Kingdom | 1985 | Vinyl | Magnum Force Records Ltd. | |
| Canada; United States | 1986 | Vinyl | Varrick Records | |
| Canada; United States | 2010s | Music download; streaming | Tab Records | |
