= Wonderful Wanda =

Studio album by Wanda Jackson
- Released: August 1962
- Recorded: April 1961 – February 1962
- Studios: Bradley Studios, Nashville, Tennessee
- Genres: Country; pop
- Label: Capitol
- Producer: Ken Nelson

Wanda Jackson chronology
Right or Wrong (1961)	Wonderful Wanda (1962)	Love Me Forever (1963)

Singles from Wonderful Wanda
- 1. "In the Middle of a Heartache" Released: September 1961; 2. "A Little Bitty Tear" Released: December 1961; 3. "If I Cried Every Time You Hurt Me" Released: March 1962

Wonderful Wanda is a studio album by American recording artist Wanda Jackson. It was released in August 1962 via Capitol Records and contained 12 tracks. It was the fourth studio album in Jackson's music career and her first to consist entirely of country music songs. Wonderful Wanda included the songs "In the Middle of a Heartache", "A Little Bitty Tear" and "If I Cried Every Time You Hurt Me". All three recordings became commercially-successful singles on both the country and pop charts respectively.

== Background ==
In the 1950s, Wanda Jackson became one of the United States' first female Rockabilly performers. During this era she recorded singles like "Fujiyama Mama" and "Let's Have a Party". In 1961, Jackson returned to the country market with the single "Right or Wrong". After the song's country success, Jackson traveled to Nashville, Tennessee to record more country sides with producer Ken Nelson. According to Jackson and fellow-writer/historian Scott Bomar, it was the first Nashville sessions to feature musician Roy Clark on guitar. It was also among her first sessions to feature orchestra and string arrangements.

== Content ==
The sessions for Wonderful Wanda were held at the Bradley Studios in Nashville between April 1961 and February 1962. The album was a collection of 12 songs. Both "I'd Be Ashamed" and "In the Middle of a Heartache" were penned by Jackson herself. Also included were cover versions of songs first made successful by other artists. "Is It Wrong (For Loving You)", which was first made popular by Warner Mack, while "Seven Lonely Days" was first made successful by Georgia Gibbs. Other songwriters included on the album project were Hank Cochran and Harlan Howard.

== Release and critical reception ==
Professional ratings
Review scores
Source	Rating
Billboard	Favorable

Wonderful Wanda was released in August 1962 on Capitol Records and was the fourth proper studio release of Jackson's career. The album was originally distributed as a vinyl LP containing six songs on either side of the record. In later years, it was distributed to digital and streaming sites, including Apple Music, which issued the album on Capitol Records Nashville. Wonderful Wanda received a positive review from Billboard magazine following its original release. "In all moods she's in fine form here and the fans will quickly dig," staff writers noted.

== Singles ==
Prior to the album's release, Jackson had reached success with its first single, "In the Middle of a Heartache". The song spent 15 weeks on the Billboard Hot Country Songs and peaked at number six in January 1962, becoming her highest-charting disc on the survey. It also became her third single to chart on the Billboard Hot 100, peaking at number 27 in December 1961. It was followed by Jackson's version of "A Little Bitty Tear", which was released as a single in December 1961 and peaked at number 84 on the Hot 100 in January 1962. In March 1962, "If I Cried Every Time You Hurt Me" was issued as the project's final single. Not only did it peak at number 58 on the Billboard Hot 100, it also climbed to number 28 on the country songs chart and number 16 on the adult contemporary singles chart. In addition, both "A Little Bitty Tear" and "In the Middle of a Heartache" reached lower-charting positions in Australia in 1962.

== Track listings ==
Side one
No.	Title	Writer(s)	Length
1.	"In the Middle of a Heartache"	Laurie Christenson; Pat Franzese; Wanda Jackson	2:34
2.	"Seven Lonely Days"	Marshall Brown; Alden Shuman; Earl Shuman	2:08
3.	"If I Cried Every Time You Hurt Me"	Harlan Howard	2:32
4.	"Is It Wrong"	Warner MacPherson	2:16
5.	"Don't Ask Me Why"	Ben Weisman; Fred Wise	2:30
6.	"Let My Love Walk In"	Dick Glasser	2:15

Side two
No.	Title	Writer(s)	Length
1.	"A Little Bitty Tear"	Hank Cochran	2:16
2.	"I Need You Now"	Jimmie Crane; Al Jacobs	2:17
3.	"I Don't Wanta Go"	Glasser	2:14
4.	"We Could"	Felice Bryant	3:01
5.	"You Don't Know, Baby"	Walter Spriggs	2:45
6.	"I'd Be Ashamed"	Jackson	2:39

== Release history ==
Region	Date	Format	Label	Ref.
United Kingdom	August 1962	Vinyl	Jasmine Records	
United States	August 1962	Vinyl	Capitol Records	
United States	2010s	Digital; Streaming	Capitol Records Nashville	
