= Jack Hammer (songwriter) =

American pianist, singer and songwriter (1925–2016)

- Also known as: Earl Burrows; George Stone; T.T. Tyler
- Born: Earl Solomon Burroughs; September 16, 1925; Grovetown, Georgia, United States
- Died: April 8, 2016 (aged 90) Oakland, California, United States
- Genres: Rhythm and blues, pop
- Occupations: Songwriter, pianist, singer, actor, dancer, MC
- Label: Ronnex

Earl Solomon Burroughs (September 16, 1925 – April 8, 2016), known professionally as Jack Hammer, was an American pianist, singer, and songwriter, credited as the co-writer of "Great Balls of Fire".

== Life and career ==
Burroughs was born in Grovetown, Georgia, but grew up in California. In the early 1950s, he moved to New York City, where he worked as an MC at the Baby Grand Theatre. He began writing songs, one of his earliest being "Fujiyama Mama", recorded by Annisteen Allen, Eileen Barton, and a few years later by Wanda Jackson. After starting to use the pseudonym Jack Hammer, he also wrote "Rock 'n' Roll Call", recorded by the Treniers and Louis Jordan. He also recorded several singles in the mid-1950s, including "Football Rock" on Decca, and "Girl Girl Girl" on Roulette.

Hammer wrote a song, "Great Balls of Fire", and submitted it to songwriter Paul Case, who liked the title but not the song itself. Case passed the idea to Otis Blackwell, and commissioned him to write a song of the same title for inclusion in the film Jamboree, with Hammer taking a half share of the songwriting royalties. The song was successfully recorded by Jerry Lee Lewis, for whom Hammer also later wrote "Milkshake Mademoiselle". He also wrote "Peek-A-Boo", a hit for the Cadillacs. Much of Hammer's songwriting work is credited to various aliases including Earl Burrows, Early S. Burrows, George Stone, and T.T. Tyler. His song "Plain Gold Ring" appeared on Nina Simone's 1958 debut album Little Girl Blue, and was later recorded by Nick Cave, Kimbra and others.

In 1960, he recorded an LP, Rebellion - Jack Hammer Sings and Reads Songs and Poems of the Beat Generation, for the Warwick label. In the same year, when the lead vocalist of the Platters left for a solo career, Jack Hammer joined the group and performed, recorded, and wrote songs for them. The following year he moved to Paris, where he performed impersonations of Sammy Davis Jr. and Chuck Berry in cabaret, and then to Belgium. There, he recorded a series of twist songs, including "Kissin' Twist", which became a big hit in Belgium, Germany, France and Sweden. A good dancer, Hammer became known in Europe as "The Twistin' King", and released an LP under that title. In Britain, its title was changed to Hammer + Beat = Twist, released by Oriole Records. He then moved to Germany, and performed on US military bases.

In the mid-1970s, he moved back to the US, and at one point was scheduled to play the part of Jimi Hendrix in a movie that was never made. Jack Hammer performed in the Broadway production of Bubbling Brown Sugar from February 1976 to December 1977.

He later lived in Hollywood. He died on April 8, 2016, at home in Oakland, California.

Hammer's youngest daughter, Amelia Hammer Harris, appeared on season 16 of American Idol in 2018. In addition to revealing to the show's judges, Luke Bryan, Katy Perry, and Lionel Richie, that her father wrote "Great Balls of Fire", she also claimed that he wrote "Yakety Yak". However, Hammer actually wrote a song with a similar title, "Yakkity Yak", which was issued as a B-side by the Markeys (not to be confused with The Mar-Keys).
