= Rockin' with Wanda =

Compilation album by Wanda Jackson
- Released: May 1960
- Genres: Rock and roll; rockabilly; country
- Length: 27:17
- Label: Capitol
- Producer: Ken Nelson

Wanda Jackson chronology
Wanda Jackson (1958)	Rockin' with Wanda (1960)	There's a Party Goin' On (1961)

Rockin' with Wanda is a compilation album by country music and rockabilly singer Wanda Jackson. It was released in 1960 by Capitol Records (catalog no. T-1384). The album cover calls it "a collection of great country songs in the rhythmic singing style of Wanda Jackson."

AllMusic gave the album a rating of four-and-a-half stars. Reviewer Richie Unterberger called it "absolutely the best collection of Wanda Jackson's rockabilly recordings" and "a leading candidate for the best female rock & roll album of the 1950s."

== Track listing ==
Side A

1. "Rock Your Baby" (Wanda Jackson) [1:43]
2. "Fujiyama Mama" (Earl Burrows) [2:11]
3. "You're the One for Me" (Steve Rowland) [1:58]
4. "Did You Miss Me?" (Bobby Lord) [2:16]
5. "Cool Love" (Vicki Countryman, Wanda Jackson) [2:17]
6. "Honey Bop" (Mae Boren Axton, Tommy Durden, Glenn Reeves) [2:14]

Side B

1. "Hot Dog! That Made Him Mad" (Danny Barker, Don Raye) [2:40]
2. "Baby Loves Him" (Wanda Jackson) [2:02]
3. "Mean Mean Man" (Wanda Jackson) [2:13]
4. "You've Turned to a Stranger' (Freddy Franks, Jack Rhodes) [2:43]
5. "Don'a Wan'a" (Boudleaux Bryant) [2:15]
6. "I Gotta Know" (Matt Williams, Paul Evans) [2:30]

Bonus tracks on CD
A later reissue of the album for compact disc included six bonus tracks:

1. "(Everytime They Play) Our Song" (Howard Thomas, Rachel Lane) [2:03]
2. "Sinful Heart" (Wanda Jackson) [2:38]
3. "Savin' My Love" (Wanda Jackson) [2:09]
4. "A Date with Jerry" (Cindy Walker) [2:16]
5. "Reaching" (Skeets McDonald) [2:22]
6. "Id Rather Have You" (Thelma Blackmon) 2:33
