= Wanda Jackson (album) =

Studio album by Wanda Jackson
- Released: July 21, 1958
- Genre: Country; pop; rockabilly
- Length: 29:59
- Label: Capitol
- Producer: Ken Nelson

Wanda Jackson chronology
Wanda Jackson (1958)	Rockin' with Wanda (1960)

Wanda Jackson is the debut studio album by country music and rockabilly singer Wanda Jackson. It was released in July 1958 by Capitol Records (catalog no. T-1041).

In the annual poll of country music disc jockeys by Billboard magazine, it was ranked as the No. 15 album of 1958.

AllMusic gave the album a rating of four-and-a-half stars. Reviewer William Ruhlman wrote that Jackson showed versatility on the album, performing songs in traditional country and pop styles, in addition to the rockabilly style that brought her fame.

== Track listing ==
Side A

1. "Day Dreaming" (Bill Cantrell, Quinton Claunch, Bud Deckelman) [3:08]
2. "I Wanna Waltz" (Thelma Blackmon) [2:04]
3. "Heartbreak Ahead" (Dorothy Summers Brown) [2:48]
4. "Making Believe" (Jimmy Work) [2:19]
5. "Here We Are Again" (Don Everly, Phil Everly) [2:51]
6. "Long Tall Sally" (Robert "Bumps" Blackwell, Enotris Johnson, Richard Penniman) [1:59]

Side B

1. "Just Call Me Lonesome" (Rex Griffin) [3:09]
2. "Let Me Go Lover" (Jenny Lou Carson, Al Hill) [2:14]
3. "Money, Honey" (Jesse Stone) [2:14]
4. "I Can't Make My Dreams Understood" (Buck Bryant, Jim West) [2:23]
5. "Happy, Happy Birthday" (Gilbert Lopez, Margo Sylvia) [2:38]
6. "Let's Have a Party" (Jessie Mae Robinson) [2:11]

Bonus tracks

1. "Half as Good a Girl" (Jack Rhodes)
2. "Silver Threads and Golden Needles" (Dick Reynolds, Jack Rhodes)
3. "Cryin' Through the Night" (Oscar Levant)
4. "Let Me Explain" (Chuck Willis)
5. "No Wedding Bells for Joe" (Jim Coleman, Marijohn Wilkin)
6. "Just a Queen For a Day" (Harlan Howard)
