= I Remember Elvis =

Studio album by Wanda Jackson
- Released: January 31, 2006
- Recorded: July – September 2005
- Studios: Bedworth Studios; Redrum Studios; Stanley Recordings
- Genres: Rock and roll; pop rock
- Length: 47:52
- Label: Goldenlane
- Producer: Danny B. Harvey

Wanda Jackson chronology
Heart Trouble (2003)	I Remember Elvis (2006)	The Party Ain't Over (2011)

Singles from I Remember Elvis
- 1. "Good Rockin' Tonight" Released: 2007

I Remember Elvis is a studio album by American recording artist Wanda Jackson. It was released on January 31, 2006, via Goldenlane Records and contained 15 tracks. The album was a collection of rock and roll recordings all of which were made popular first by Elvis Presley. It was Presley who inspired Jackson to record rock and roll in her early career and ultimately influenced her musical trajectory. The album received positive reviews following its release.

== Background ==
Wanda Jackson had first met up and coming Elvis Presley in the mid-1950s. The two were assigned on package shows across the United States and Jackson watched as his fame grew during the tour. The pair even began a brief romantic relationship during the same time period. It was Presley who inspired Jackson to record rock and roll by playing records made popular by R&B musicians. Jackson went on to record rock during the 1950s before transitioning to both country and gospel music. She returned to rock and roll in the 1980s and recorded several albums during that period. Jackson chose to record an album dedicated to Presley after realizing that it was important to thank her mentor. " I finally got the nerve to do it. To take an artist like Elvis and perform those songs is a very hard thing to do. I thought that if I was ever going to say “thank you,” then now is the time I should do it," she told The Independent.

== Recording and content ==
Jackson recorded I Remember Elvis between July and September 2005. It was cut at three separate studios, all of which were located in California: Bedworth Studios, Redrum Studios and Stanley Recordings. The album was produced by Danny B. Harvey of the rock band The Head Cat. She chose to record songs from Presley's early catalog that she heard while on tour with him. "Those were the songs I got to watch and hear him sing. And they were the songs climbing up the Billboard charts when we were out on the road together," she recalled. It also features an audio discussion at the end of the disc where Jackson shares memories about Presley. A total of 16 tracks comprised the album.

The songs chosen for the project included Jackson's covers of "Heartbreak Hotel", "Good Rocking Tonight", "Love Me Tender" and "I Forgot to Remember to Forget". Country Standard Time described "Good Rockin' Tonight", "Tryin' to Get to You" and "Baby Let's Play House" as "bluesy" tracks that include Jackson's "trademark growl". The album also includes one new track dedicated to him titled "I Wore Elvis's Ring". The song is based on the true story of an actual ring given to Jackson by Presley once they began dating. She still has the ring today.

== Critical reception ==
Professional ratings
Review scores
Source	Rating
AllMusic	3.5/5 stars
Slant Magazine	3/5 stars

I Remember Elvis received positive reviews from critics and journalists. Mark Deming of AllMusic gave the project three and half stars in his review of the record. Deming described the musical sound as "classic rockabilly mode" but found that her voice had "started to show some slight signs of wear" yet also found that Jackson delivered "into these tunes with audible enthusiasm and a great feel for the material." Deming concluded by stating, "I Remember Elvis is something short of revelatory, but it is a sincere and loving tribute to an influential artist from someone who learned from him first-hand, and it proves that Jackson is still the Queen of Rock & Roll just as much as Elvis remains the King. Fine stuff. Billboard magazine gave the record a positive response in their review as well. Writers described Jackson as having "a pioneering role" in the shaping of early rock and roll.

Ken Burke of Country Standard Time gave the record a mostly positive response as well. Burke noted that she seemed "short of breath" on some songs but nonetheless stated that "the disc is worth buying if only to hear Jackson sing the catchy new ditty 'I Wore Elvis's Ring,' and talk about her brief romance with the young Elvis Presley. Jonathan Keefe of Slant Magazine praised Jackson's delivery of Presley's rock material: " Remember Elvis finds Jackson in trademark, fiery form."

== Release and singles ==
I Remember Elvis was originally released on January 31, 2006 on Goldenlane Records. It was originally offered as both a compact disc and a vinyl LP. In the United Kingdom and Europe, it was released as Baby Let's Play House in 2011. It has since been released several more times under different titles. Jackson's cover of "Good Rockin' Tonight" was released as a single in 2007 on Goldenlane Records.

== Track listings ==
I Remember Elvis
No.	Title	Writer(s)	Length
1.	"Wanda Introduction"		0:19
2.	"Good Rockin' Tonight"	Roy Brown	2:55
3.	"Blue Moon of Kentucky"	Bill Monroe	2:15
4.	"Heartbreak Hotel"	Mae Boren Axton; Thomas Durden; Elvis Presley	2:32
5.	"I Don't Care If the Sun Don't Shine"	Mack David	2:52
6.	"Trying to Get to You"	Rose Marie McCoy; Charles Singleton	2:42
7.	"Baby, Let's Play House"	Arthur Gunter	2:41
8.	"Give Me the Right"	Norman Blagman; Fred Wise	3:19
9.	"I'm Left, You're Right, He's Gone"	Stan Kesler; Ben Taylor	3:12
10.	"Mystery Train"	Junior Parker	3:56
11.	"Ain't That Loving You Baby"	Ivory Joe Hunter; Clyde Otis	2:53
12.	"I Forgot to Remember to Forget Him"	Charlie Feathers; Kesler	2:53
13.	"I Wore Elvis' Ring"	Robert Burke Warren	3:18
14.	"Too Much"	Lee Rosenberg; Bernard Weinman	3:03
15.	"Love Me Tender"	Ken Darby; George R. Poulton	3:12
16.	"Wanda Talks About Elvis"		5:50
Total length:			47:52

== Personnel ==
All credits are adapted from the liner notes of I Remember Elvis and AllMusic.

Musical personnel

- Clem Burke – Drums
- Danny B. Harvey – Background vocals, guitar
- Wanda Jackson – Lead vocals
- Lynda Kay Parker – Background vocals
- Racer X – Upright bass
- Don Randi – Piano
- John Would – Lap steel guitar

Technical personnel

- Gilby Clarke – Audio engineer
- Danny B. Harvey – Audio engineer, audio production, mixing, producer
- John Would – Audio engineer, mixing

== Release history ==
Region	Date	Format	Label	Ref.
North America	January 31, 2006	Compact disc	Goldenlane Records	
North America	2007	Vinyl	Cleopatra Records	
Europe	March 11, 2011	Compact disc	Rockarola Records; Music Avenue	
North America	September 13, 2011	Compact disc	Rock-A-Billy Records	
North America	September 13, 2011	Vinyl	Rock-A-Billy Records	
North America	2013	Vinyl	Goldenlane Records	
North America	2010s	Music download; streaming	Goldenlane Records	
North America	2020	Vinyl	Cleopatra Records	
