= Karel Zich =

Czech composer, guitarist and singer

- Born: Karel Zich; 10 June 1949; Prague, Czechoslovakia
- Died: 13 July 2004 (aged 55) Porto-Vecchio, France
- Occupation: Singer
- Instrument(s): Vocals, guitar, piano
- Years active: 1964–2004
- Website: Karelzich.cz

Karel Zich (10 June 1949 – 13 July 2004) was a Czech singer, guitarist and composer whose voice was often compared with that of Elvis Presley.

== Life ==
Karel Zich was born in Prague, Czechoslovakia, into a musical family. His grandfather was Otakar Zich, composer and professor of music aesthetics, and his uncle was the composer Jaroslav Zich. Karel attended the Prague State Conservatory (Státní konzervatoř Praha) for three years and later graduated from Charles University in sociology.

Between 1964 and 1965 he performed with the band Framus as a singer. In 1968 Zich joined Spirituál kvintet and stayed with them until 1973. His main interest was in rock'n'roll, and he is sometimes called the "Czech Elvis".

After his successes in the Czech pop scene with various bands, Zich decided to start his solo career. In 1974 he left Spirituál kvintet and in 1976 released his first album, Dům č.5 (House No. 5). Although he sang his own songs, he also worked with famous composers Karel Svoboda, Petr Janda, and others.

In 1975 Zich reached the top of his career by winning 4th place in Zlatý Slavík. In 1979 he founded the band Flop and recorded 50 singles and 15 albums, one with the legendary Wanda Jackson. During his career Zich sold over one million discs and performed at thousands of concerts in most European countries, the United States, Canada, Brazil, Chile and elsewhere. His most famous songs are Paráda (Awesome) and Měla na očích brýle. Twice took 2nd place in the country's top music festival and song contest, Bratislavská lýra, in 1977 and 1983.

In his last years he often performed guitar solos and sometimes performed with his band. In 1992 he joined Spirituál kvintet again.

== Death ==
Karel Zich died of complications following a heart attack during a diving holiday in Porto-Vecchio, Corsica.

== Selected discography ==
- Let's Have a Party in Prague (with Wanda Jackson) – 1988
