= Annisteen Allen =

American blues and jazz singer (1920–1992)

- Born: Ernestine Letitia Allen; November 11, 1920; Champaign, Illinois, United States
- Died: August 10, 1992 (aged 71) Harlem, New York City, New York, United States
- Genres: Blues, jazz
- Occupation: Singer
- Instrument: Vocals
- Years active: 1945–1986
- Labels: Tru-Sound LP, Capitol/Pathe Marconi, Official, Rev-Ola

Annisteen Allen (November 11, 1920 – August 10, 1992) was an American blues and jazz singer.

Born Ernestine Letitia Allen in Champaign, Illinois, United States, her first recordings were made in 1945, and included "Miss Annie's Blues" and "Love for Sale." She sang with Big John Greer, Wynonie Harris, and Lucky Millinder. In 1951, Federal Records signed her to sing with Millinder's orchestra. She scored other hits with Millinder such as "I'll Never Be Free", "Let It Roll", "I'm Waiting Just for You" (written by Carolyn Leigh and Henry Glover), "Moanin' the Blues", "I Want a Man," and "More, More, More." Federal's parent company, King Records, acquired her in 1953.

Her single, "Baby I'm Doin' It," released in 1953 appeared on the US Billboard R&B chart (No. 8). After releasing the single, Apollo Records sued King for copyright infringement, and as a result King dropped her from its roster. She then signed with Capitol Records and did tours with Joe Morris and The Orioles. In 1955, she scored a hit in the US with "Fujiyama Mama." The track was later covered by Eileen Barton and then by Wanda Jackson.

Allen became a solo artist in the 1960s.

Annisteen Allen died in Harlem, New York City at age 71.

Josh Binney filmed her performing "Let it Roll" with Lucky Millinder in 1948.

== Discography ==
=== As leader/co-leader ===
- 1961: Let it Roll (Tru-Sound) - (as Ernestine Allen) with King Curtis, Al Casey, Belton Evans and Chauncey Westbrook

== Bibliography ==
- Komara, Edward (ed.) (2005), Encyclopedia of the Blues, Routledge, ISBN 978-0415926997
