= Right or Wrong (Wanda Jackson album) =

Studio album by Wanda Jackson
- Released: October 1961
- Genre: Country; rock and roll
- Label: Capitol
- Producer: Ken Nelson

Wanda Jackson chronology
There's a Party Goin' On (1961)	Right or Wrong (1961)	Wonderful Wanda (1962)

Professional ratings
Review scores
Source	Rating
New Record Mirror	3/5 stars

Right or Wrong is a studio album by country music and rockabilly singer Wanda Jackson. It was released in October 1961 by Capitol Records (catalog no. ST-1596). The album cover says that Jackson "pours sugar over six ballads and rocks around six big beat tunes." The album included Jackson's hit song "Right or Wrong", which peaked at No. 9 on the country chart and No. 29 on the pop chart.

The album was recorded at the Bradley studio in Nashville on October 28, 1960. Jackson provided the lead vocals and played guitar. Backing musicians included Buck Owens, Roy Clark, and Marvin Hughes.

AllMusic gave the compact disc reissue of the album (including bonus tracks) a rating of two-and-a-half stars. The compact disc includes four bonus tracks not included on the original album.

== Track listing ==
Side A

1. "Right or Wrong" (Wanda Jackson) [2:37]
2. "Why I'm Walkin'" (Melvin Endsley, Stonewall Jackson)
3. "So Soon" (Mel Tillis, Wayne Walker)
4. "The Last Letter" (Rex Griffin)
5. "I May Never Get to Heaven" (Bill Anderson, Buddy Killen)
6. "The Window Up Above" (George Jones)

Side B

1. "Sticks and Stones" (Titus Turner)
2. "Stupid Cupid" (Neil Sedaka, Howard Greenfield)
3. "Slippin' and a Slidin'" (Albert Collins, Edwin Bocage, James Smith, Richard Penniman)
4. "Brown Eyed Handsome Man" (Chuck Berry)
5. "Who Shot Sam" (Darrell Edwards, George Jones, Ray Jackson)
6. "My Baby Left Me" (Arthur Crudup)

Compact disc bonus tracks
When the album was reissued on compact discs, it included three bonus tracks:

1. "You Can't Have My Love"
2. "In the Middle of a Heartache"
3. "Let's Have a Party"
