= Tears Will Be the Chaser for Your Wine =

Single by Wanda Jackson

from the album Reckless Love Affair
- B-side: "Reckless Love Affair"
- Released: November 1966
- Recorded: April 19, 1966; Nashville, Tennessee, U.S
- Genre: Country
- Label: Capitol
- Songwriters: Leroy Goates, Dale Davis
- Producer: Ken Nelson

Wanda Jackson singles chronology
"This Gun Don't Care" (1966)	"Tears Will Be the Chaser for Your Wine" (1966)	"Both Sides of the Line" (1967)

"Tears Will Be the Chaser for Your Wine" is a song written by Leroy Coates and Dale Davis. It was recorded and released as a single by American country, rock, and Christian artist, Wanda Jackson.

The song was recorded at the Columbia Recording Studio on April 19, 1966, in Nashville, Tennessee, United States. "Tears Will Be the Chaser for Your Wine" was officially released as a single in November 1966, peaking at number eleven on the Billboard Magazine Hot Country Singles chart. The song was issued on Jackson's 1966 studio album, Reckless Love Affair.

Music journalist, Robert K. Oermann and anthropologist, Mary A. Bufwack called this song, among Jackson's other late 1960s recordings, "self-assertive about women's issues".

== Chart performance ==
Chart (1966–1967)	Peak position
U.S. Billboard Hot Country Singles	11
