= Jessie Mae Robinson =

American songwriter

- Born: Jessie Mae Booker; October 1, 1918; Call, Texas, U.S.
- Died: October 26, 1966 (aged 48) Los Angeles, California, U.S.
- Occupation: Songwriter
- Years active: c.1940–1966

Jessie Mae Robinson (née Booker, October 1, 1918 – October 26, 1966) was an American musician and songwriter, whose compositions included many R&B and pop hits of the 1940s and 1950s, including "Black Night", "I Went to Your Wedding", and "Let's Have a Party".

== Biography ==
Jessie Mae Booker was born in Call, Texas; she was of African descent and was raised in Los Angeles where she started writing songs in her teens and met and married Leonard Robinson. After a few years she began pitching her songs to performers and music publishers. Her first song to be recorded was "Mellow Man Blues" by Dinah Washington in 1945. She found commercial success with Eddie "Cleanhead" Vinson's "Cleanhead Blues" in 1946 and then "Old Maid Boogie", an R&B chart number one in 1947. Among the R&B chart hits written by Robinson over the following few years were "In the Middle of the Night", "Roomin' House Boogie", and "Tears, Tears, Tears", all hits for Amos Milburn; "Sneakin' Around", by Rudy Render, covered in 1971 by Canned Heat; "Blue Light Boogie" recorded by Louis Jordan in 1950; and Charles Brown's number one hit in 1951, "Black Night" and its follow-up "Seven Long Days".

In 1952, Damita Jo recorded Robinson's song "I Went to Your Wedding", which was then covered more successfully by Patti Page, whose version went to number one on the pop chart, and by country star Hank Snow. The song's success allowed Robinson to become "one of the few black songwriters to break the colour barrier", and one of the first female African-American members of ASCAP. She wrote further pop hits for Jo Stafford ("Keep It a Secret", 1952; also recorded by Hank Snow) and Frankie Laine ("I'm Just a Poor Bachelor", 1953), as well as "Let's Have a Party", first recorded by Elvis Presley in 1957 and later by Wanda Jackson. One of her last successes was "The Other Woman", a chart hit for Sarah Vaughan in 1958 and later recorded by Nina Simone, Jeff Buckley (in an outtake from his album Grace from 1994) and Lana Del Rey (on her 2014 album Ultraviolence).

After her songwriting career ended, Robinson attempted to start small record labels in the 1960s with little success. She died at home in Los Angeles after a short illness in October 1966, aged 48.
