= Fujiyama Mama =

Song

Single by Annisteen Allen
- B-side: "Wheels of Love"
- Released: February 1955
- Genre: R&B
- Length: 2:27
- Label: Capitol
- Songwriter: Jack Hammer
- Producer: Howard Biggs

Annisteen Allen singles chronology
"I've Got Troubles" (1954)	"Fujiyama Mama" (1955)	"I'm Still in Love with You" (1955)

"Fujiyama Mama" is a song written by Earl Burrows (later known as Jack Hammer). It was first recorded in 1955 by Annisteen Allen, and in 1957 by rockabilly singer Wanda Jackson, both for Capitol. It did not chart in the United States, but Jackson's recording became a No. 1 hit in Japan for six months in 1958.

== Composition and Annisteen Allen original version ==
The song was written in 1954 by Earl Burrows, one of several pseudonyms used by Earl Solomon Burroughs (who later was co-writer of "Great Balls of Fire" and other hits under the name Jack Hammer). Burrows wrote the song from the perspective of a Japanese woman. She says she has drunk a quart of sake and is about to "blow my top". The lyrics assert that "when I start you up, there ain't nobody gonna make me stop," and compare the woman's energy to the atomic bombs dropped on Hiroshima and Nagasaki and the iconic Japanese volcano, Mount Fuji.

The song was first recorded by Annisteen Allen, an African American R&B singer, for Capitol Records in early 1955. It featured an instrumental and vocal group accompaniment by African American arranger Howard Biggs. The song and recording received favorable reviews from The Indianapolis News, The Pittsburgh Press, and the Los Angeles Mirror-News. Billboard magazine credited the record's "clever lyrics and Oriental sound gimmicks", but predicted that many disc jockeys would not play it due to its "off-beat lyric." Nevertheless, the song was listed on Billboard's "Coming Up Fast" chart in March and April 1955.

=== Track listings ===
7" vinyl single (US)

- "Fujiyama Mama" – 2:27
- "Wheels of Love" – 2:00

== Wanda Jackson cover version ==
"Fujiyama Mama"

Single by Wanda Jackson
- B-side: "No Wedding Bells for Joe"
- Released: December 1957 (U.S.); April 1958 (Japan)
- Genre: Novelty; R&B; Rockabilly
- Length: 2:30
- Label: Capitol
- Songwriter: Jack Hammer
- Producer: Ken Nelson

Wanda Jackson singles chronology
"Cool Love" (1957)	"Fujiyama Mama" (1957)	"Honey Bop" (1958)

=== Recording ===
Jackson recorded the song in 1957 for the Capitol label. In her autobiography, she recalled that she had wanted to record it since hearing Annisteen Allen's version. She suggested it to producer Ken Nelson, but he was "a little worried about me singing those words." She persuaded Nelson to let her record it, and it "has become a classic and is the one I think of as the start of the fully unbridled rockabilly version of Wanda Jackson that fans know me for today." One music writer called it Jackson's “most lyrically and musically daring recording," as she added "growls, shrieks, and soft deep-voiced interludes to the song."

=== Reception and chart performance ===
Jackson's version did not chart in the United States. Jackson recalled in 2009: "Nobody would play it. They barely had accepted Elvis and the other ones, and they weren't too sure about accepting a teenage girl singing this kind of music." Others have suggested that the song's sexually charged lyrics were too controversial for an American audience in the 1950s. One author observed: "Wanda Jackson offers us the ultimate Virile Female metaphor here. [Jackson] did volcanic Rockabilly. Only a few female rock and rollers . . . have ever blasted Wanda’s incredible energy." Despite the lack of chart success in the United States, the song was a major hit in Japan, reaching No. 1 in 1958. It held the No. 1 spot in Japan for six months and was the first rock and roll song to become a big hit in Japan. An earlier recording was also a hit in Japan in 1955 under the title "I'm a Fujiyama Mama & I'm About to Blow My Top".

=== Impact ===
With the song's popularity, Jackson toured Japan in February and March 1959. The tour was "a sensation" among Japanese fans. During her tour of Japan, she played at theatres, clubs, and military bases, and was booked for three shows a day, seven days a week, over several weeks. Jackson remained popular in Japan and later recorded songs in Japanese.

Some have questioned how an American song that explicitly referenced the dropping of atomic bombs on Japan could have become a major pop hit in Japan. One author attributes the success of the song in Japan to its embodiment of the desire for female empowerment in post-war Japan. Another author cited the song's provocative sexuality and even suggested that Jackson, a white singer, was engaged in "appropriation of the sexual allure of an oriental woman."

=== Track listings ===
7" vinyl single (US)

- "Fujiyama Mama" – 2:11
- "No Wedding Bells for Joe" – 2:30

7" vinyl single (Japan)

- "Fujiyama Mama" (フジヤマ・ママ) – 2:11
- "No Wedding Bells for Joe" (哀れなジョー) – 2:30

=== Charts ===
Chart (1958)	Peak position
Japan pop singles	1

== Cover versions ==
Eileen Barton, a white pop singer, also recorded the song in March 1955 for Coral Records. The song was also covered by the American band Pearl Harbor and the Explosions. The song was also covered by a number of Japanese singers. The first notable cover was done in 1958 by Izumi Yukimura, whose rendition became a minor hit in the US in March 1959. It was also covered by Tamaki Sawa, and Haruomi Hosono, the founder of Yellow Magic Orchestra.
