= In the Middle of a Heartache =

Single by Wanda Jackson

from the album Wonderful Wanda
- B-side: "I'd Be Ashamed"
- Released: September 1961
- Recorded: April 20, 1961; Nashville, Tennessee, U.S.
- Genre: Country, Nashville sound
- Length: 2:34
- Label: Capitol
- Songwriters: Laurie Christenson, Pat Franzese, Wanda Jackson
- Producer: Ken Nelson

Wanda Jackson singles chronology
"Right or Wrong" (1961)	"In the Middle of a Heartache" (1961)	"A Little Bitty Tear" (1961)

"In the Middle of a Heartache" is a song written by Laurie Christenson, Pat Franzese, and Wanda Jackson. The song was recorded by Wanda Jackson, an American country, rock, and Christian artist.

== Background ==
The song was recorded specifically on April 20, 1961, at the Bradley Film and Recording Studio in Nashville, Tennessee, United States. Three additional songs were recorded on the songs including her follow-up single to "Heartache" titled "A Little Bitty Tear". The session was produced by Ken Nelson.

== Chart performance ==
"In the Middle of a Heartache" was officially released as a single in September 1961, peaking at number six on the Billboard Magazine Hot Country and Western Sides chart in early 1962. In addition, the single peaked at number twenty seven on the Billboard Hot 100, becoming Jackson's third and final top-forty song on that chart. "In the Middle of a Heartache" was Jackson's highest-charting single on the Billboard country songs chart and the Hot 100 as well. It is also her final top-ten hit to date.

== Charts ==
Chart (1961)	Peak position
Australia Top 100 Singles (Kent Music Report)	73
US Billboard Hot 100	27
US Hot Country Songs (Billboard)	6
