= Let's Have a Party =

1957 single by Elvis Presley

"Party"

Single by Elvis Presley

from the album Loving You
- B-side: "Got a Lot o' Livin' to Do!"
- Released: September 1957 (UK)
- Recorded: January 21, 1957; Hollywood, California, United States
- Genre: Rock and roll
- Length: 1:33
- Label: RCA Victor
- Songwriter: Jessie Mae Robinson

Elvis Presley singles chronology
"Paralyzed" (1957)	"Party" (1957)	"Jailhouse Rock" (1957)

"Let's Have a Party"

Single by Wanda Jackson

from the album Wanda Jackson
- B-side: "Cool Love"
- Released: June 1960
- Recorded: April 7, 1958; Hollywood, California, United States
- Genre: Rock and roll
- Label: Capitol
- Songwriter: Jessie Mae Robinson
- Producer: Ken Nelson

Wanda Jackson singles chronology
"Please Call Today" (1960)	"Let's Have a Party" (1960)	"Mean Mean Man" (1960)

"Let's Have a Party" is a 1957 song written by Jessie Mae Robinson and recorded by Elvis Presley for the movie Loving You. It was released as a single in the United Kingdom under the title "Party" and peaked at No. 2 in the UK Singles Chart. ISWC identifyer T-070.165.037-4. Wanda Jackson recorded the song for her first album, Wanda Jackson, released in 1958. The song was released as a single by Jackson in 1960 and entered the UK chart on 1 September of that year, spending eight weeks there and reaching No. 32; it also reached No. 37 on the Billboard Hot 100 in 1960. The Jackson version was later featured in the 1989 film Dead Poets Society. Her recording of the song was inducted into the Grammy Hall of Fame in 2024.

Paul McCartney also recorded and released the song (under the title "Party") on his 1999 Run Devil Run album. His original song "Run Devil Run", on the album of the same name, also has a similar melody. A cover of "Let's Have a Party" by Sonia was included on the 2010 remastered edition of her 1990 album Everybody Knows.

The song was included under the title "Party" in the Broadway musical Million Dollar Quartet, which opened in New York in April 2010. It was sung by Robert Britton Lyons, portraying Carl Perkins, as well as by the company of the show, and was covered by Robert Britton Lyons and the company on the Million Dollar Quartet original Broadway cast recording.

In T. Rex's 1972 concert film Born to Boogie, Marc Bolan and Ringo Starr attempt to recite one of the lyrics from the song ("some people like to rock, some people like to roll, but movin' and a-groovin's gonna satisfy my soul"). However, they break into laughter each time.

Led Zeppelin also played this song live during their live sets of "Whole Lotta Love"; an example of this practice can be found on their live album How the West Was Won.

English glam rock band Mud recorded the song for their 1975 album Mud Rock Volume 2.

Rock and roll band Dr. Feelgood included the song on their 1978 album Private Practice.

== Chart performance ==
=== Elvis Presley version ===
Chart (1957)	Peak position
UK Singles Chart	2

=== Wanda Jackson version ===
Chart (1960)	Peak position
Australia Top 100 Singles (Kent Music Report)	6
Netherlands (Single Top 100)	17
UK Singles (Official Charts)	32
US Billboard Hot 100	37
