= List of works by Burl Ives =

Burl Ives (1909–1995) was an American musician, actor, and author with a career that spanned more than six decades. He began as an itinerant singer and guitarist, eventually becoming a major star of CBS Radio. Ives was a film actor in the 1940s and 1950s, and in the 1960s had hits in country music. His voice-over work in Christmas specials contributed to his association with the Christmas season.

== Albums ==
- Okeh Presents the Wayfaring Stranger (1941, Okeh K-3, 4 records, 10 inch, 78 rpm)
- The Wayfaring Stranger (1944, Asch 345, 3 records, 10 inch, 78 rpm, reissued in 1947 as Stinson 345 [same catalog number], 10 inch, 78 rpm)
- The Wayfaring Stranger (1944, Columbia C-103, 4 records, 10 inch, 78 rpm)
- BBC Presents The Martins and the Coys (1944, BBC World, 6 records, 12 inch, 78 rpm)
- Lonesome Train: A Musical Legend (1944, Decca A-375, 3 records, 12 inch, 78 rpm, reissued in 1950 as Decca DL 5054, 10 inch, 33 1/3 rpm)
- Sing Out, Sweet Land! (1945, Decca A-404, 6 records, 10 inch, 78 rpm)
- A Collection of Ballads and Folk Songs (1945, Decca A-407, 4 records, 10 inch, 78 rpm, reissued in 1950 as A Collection of Ballads and Folk Songs, Volume 1, Decca DL 5080, 10 inch 33 1/3 rpm)
- Ballads and Folk Songs, Volume 2 (1946, Decca A-431, 4 records, 10 inch, 78 rpm, reissued in 1949 as Decca DL 5013, 10 inch, 33 1/3 rpm)
- A Collection of Ballads, Folk and Country Songs, Volume 3 (1949, Decca A-711, 3 records, 10 inch, 78 rpm, reissued in 1950 as Decca DL 5093, 10 inch, 33 1/3 rpm)
- The Wayfaring Stranger (1949, Stinson SLP 1, 10 inch, 78 rpm, reissued circa 1954 as Blue Tail Fly and Other Favorites, Stinson SL 1 [same catalog number], 12 inch, 33 1/3 rpm)
- Animal Fair: Songs for Children (1949, Columbia MJV 59, 2 records, 10 inch, 78 rpm)
- Mother Goose Songs (1949, Columbia MJV 61, 10 inch, 78 rpm)
- The Return of the Wayfaring Stranger (1949, C-186, 4 records, 10 inch, 78 rpm, also released as Columbia CL 6058, 10 inch, 33 1/3 rpm)
- The Wayfaring Stranger (1950, Columbia CL 6109, 10 inch, 33 1/3 rpm)
- Hymns Sung by Burl Ives (1950, Columbia C-203, 4 records, 10 inch, 78 rpm; Columbia CL 6115, 10 inch, 33 1/3 rpm)
- More Folksongs (1950, Columbia C-213, 4 records, 10 inch, 78 rpm; Columbia CL 6144, 10 inch, 33 1/3 rpm)
- Burl Ives Sings The Lollipop Tree, The Little Turtle, And The Moon Is The North Wind's Cookie (1950, Columbia MJV 110, 10 inch, 78 rpm)
- Tubby The Tuba (Victor Jory)/Animal Fair: Songs for Children (1950, Columbia JL 8013, 10 inch, 33 1/3 rpm)
- Sing Out, Sweet Land! (1950, Decca DL 8023, 12 inch, 33 1/3 rpm, reissued in 1962 as Decca DL 4304/74304 [simulated stereo])
- Historical America in Song (1950, Encyclopædia Britannica Films, 6 albums in 30 records, 12 inch, 78 rpm)
- Christmas Day in the Morning (1952, Decca DL 5428, 10 inch, 33 1/3 rpm)
- Folk Songs Dramatic And Humorous (1953, Decca DL 5467, 10 inch, 33 1/3 rpm)
- Women: Songs About The Fair Sex (1953, Decca DL 5490, 10 inch, 33 1/3 rpm)
- Coronation Concert (1954, Decca DL 8080, 12 inch, 33 1/3 rpm)
- The Wayfaring Stranger (1955, Columbia CL 628, 12 inch, 33 1/3 rpm, reissued in 1964 as Columbia CS 9041 [simulated stereo])
- The Wild Side of Life (1955, Decca DL 8107, 12 inch, 33 1/3 rpm)
- Men: Songs For And About Men (1955, Decca DL 8125, 12 inch, 33 1/3 rpm)
- Down to the Sea in Ships (1956, Decca DL 8245, 12 inch, 33 1/3 rpm)
- Women: Folk Songs About The Fair Sex (1956, Decca DL 8245, 12 inch, 33 1/3 rpm, with 4 additional songs)
- Burl Ives Sings In The Quiet Of The Night (1956, Decca DL 8247)
- Burl Ives Sings... For Fun (1956, Decca DL 8248)
- Children's Favorites (1956, Columbia CL 2570, 10 inch, 33 1/3 rpm)
- Burl Ives Sings Songs For All Ages (1957, Columbia CL 980)
- Christmas Eve With Burl Ives (1957, Decca DL 8391)
- Songs Of Ireland (1958, Decca DL 8444)
- Captain Burl Ives' Ark (1958, Decca DL 8587)
- Old Time Varieties (1958, Decca DL 8637)
- Australian Folk Songs (1958, Decca DL 8749)
- A Lincoln Treasury (contains Lonesome Train: A Musical Legend) (1959, Decca DL 9065)
- Cheers (1959, Decca DL 8886/78886)
- Burl Ives Sings Little White Duck and Other Children's Favorites (1959, Harmony HL 9507, reissued circa 1963 as Harmony HS 14507 [simulated stereo], reissued again in 1974 as Columbia C 33183 [simulated stereo])
- Ballads (1959, United Artists UAL 3030/UAS 6030)
- Return Of The Wayfaring Stranger (1960, Columbia CL 1459 and Hallmark HM 514, 12 inch, 33/13 rpm)
- Burl Ives Sings Irving Berlin (1960, United Artists UAL 3117/UAS 6117)
- Manhattan Troubadour (1961, United Artists Records UAL 3145/UAS 6145, reissued with two fewer songs as Burl Ives Favorites, 1970, Sunset SUS 5280)
- The Best Of Burl Ives (1961, Decca DX 167/DXS 7167 [simulated stereo], 2 records, reissued in 1973 as MCA 4034 [simulated stereo], 2 records)
- The Versatile Burl Ives! (1961, Decca DL 4152/74152)
- Songs Of The West (1961, Decca DL 4179/74179, reissued as MCA 196)
- It's Just My Funny Way Of Laughin' (1962, Decca DL 4279/74279)
- Burl Country Style (1962, Decca DL 4361/74361)
- Spotlight On Burl Ives And The Folk Singers Three (1962, Design DLP/SDLP 156)
- Sunshine In My Soul (1962, Decca DL 4329/74329)
- Songs I Sang In Sunday School (1963, Word W-3229-LP/ WST-8130-LP)
- Burl Ives (1963, Camay CA 3005)
- Burl Ives and the Korean Orphan Choir Sing of Faith and Joy (1963, Word W-3259-LP/WST-8140-LP)
- Singin' Easy (1963, Decca DL 4433/74433)
- The Best Of Burl's For Boys And Girls (1963, Decca DL 4390/74390 [simulated stereo], reissued in 1980 as MCA 98 [simulated stereo])
- Walt Disney Presents Summer Magic (1963, Buena Vista BV 3309/STER 4025)
- Burl Ives Presents America's Musical Heritage (1963, Longines Symphonette Society LW 194-LW 199, 6 records)
- Walt Disney Presents Burl Ives' Animal Folk (1963, Disneyland ST 3920)
- Walt Disney Presents Burl Ives' Folk Lullabies (1964, Disneyland ST 3924)
- Scouting Along with Burl Ives (1964, Columbia CSP 347)
- True Love (1964, Decca DL 4533/74533)
- Burl Ives Sings Pearly Shells and Other Favorites (1964, Decca DL 4578/74578, reissued as MCA 102)
- Chim Chim Cher-ee And Other Children's Choices (1964, Disneyland ST 3927)
- Rudolph The Red-Nosed Reindeer (1964, Decca DL 34327/4815/74815)
- My Gal Sal And Other Favorites (1965, Decca DL 4606/74606)
- On The Beach At Waikiki (1965, Decca DL 4668/74668)
- Have a Holly Jolly Christmas (1965, Decca DL 4689/74689, reissued as MCA 237)
- Shall We Gather At The River? (1965, Word W-3339-LP/WST-8339-LP)
- The Lollipop Tree (1965, Harmony HL 9551/HS 14551)
- The Daydreamer (1966, Columbia OL 6540/OS 2940)
- Burl's Choice (1966, Decca DL 4734/74734)
- Something Special (1966, Decca DL 4789/74789)
- I Do Believe (1967, Word W-3391-LP/WST-8391-LP)
- Burl Ives Sings (1967, Coronet CXS 271)
- Greatest Hits (1967, Decca DL 4850/74850)
- Burl's Broadway (1967, Decca DL 4876/74876)
- The Big Country Hits (1968, Decca DL 4972/74972)
- Sweet, Sad And Salty (1968, Decca DL 5028/75028)
- The Times They Are A-Changin' (1968, Columbia CS 9675)
- Christmas Album (1968, Columbia CS 9728)
- Burl Ives Sings Softly And Tenderly Hymns & Spirituals (1969, Columbia CS 9925)
- Got The World By The Tail (1969, Harmony HS 11275)
- Burl Ives Folk Songs And Stories (1969, Columbia CR 21526)
- Time (1970, Bell 6055, reissued as The Talented Man, 1978, Bulldog 1027)
- How Great Thou Art (1971, Word WST-8537-LP)
- A Day At The Zoo With Burl Ives (1972 Disneyland Records 1347)
- Christmas at the White House (1972, Caedmon TC 1415)
- Payin' My Dues Again (1973, MCA 318)
- Song Book (1973, MCA Coral CB 20029)
- Little Red Caboose And Other Children's Hits (1974, Disneyland 1359)
- The Best Of Burl Ives, Vol. 2 (1975, MCA 4089, 2 records)
- Hugo The Hippo (1976, United Artists LA-637-G)
- Christmas by the Bay (1977, United States Navy Band)
- We Americans: A Musical Journey With Burl Ives (1978, National Geographic Society NGS 07806)
- Live In Europe (1979, Polydor 2382094)
- The Special Magic Of Burl Ives (1981, MCA MSM 35043)
- Burl Ives Twelve Days Of Christmas (1967), Pickwick Records SPC 1018)
- Best of Burl Ives: 20th Century Masters/The Christmas Collection (September 23, 2003)

== Hit singles ==
Year	Single	Chart positions					
Year	Single	US	US AC	US Country	AU	CAN CHUM RPM	UK
1948	"Blue Tail Fly" (With The Andrews Sisters And Vic Schoen's Orchestra)	24	—	—	—	—	—
1949	"Lavender's Blue (Dilly Dilly)" (With Captain Stubby and the Buccaneers)	16	—	13	1	—	—
1949	"Riders In The Sky (A Cowboy Legend)"	21	—	—	—	—	—
1951	"On Top Of Old Smoky" (With Percy Faith And His Orchestra)	10	—	—	—	—	—
1951	"The Little White Duck"	—	—	—	15	—	—
1952	"The Wild Side of Life" (With Grady Martin And The Slewfoot Five)	30	—	6	—	—	—
1954	"The Parting Song"	—	—	—	17	—	—
1954	"True Love Goes On And On" (With Gordon Jenkins And His Orchestra And Chorus)	23	—	—	—	—	—
1957	"Marianne" (With The Trinidaddies)	84	—	—	—	—	—
1961	"A Little Bitty Tear" (With The Anita Kerr Singers And Owen Bradley's Orchestra)	9	1	2	3	6	9
1962	"Funny Way of Laughin'" (With Owen Bradley's Orchestra)	10	3	9	7	18	29
1962	"Call Me Mr. In-Between" (With Owen Bradley's Orchestra)	19	6	3	18	10	—
1962	"Mary Ann Regrets" (With Owen Bradley's Orchestra And Chorus)	39	13	12	15	6	—
1963	"The Same Old Hurt" (With Owen Bradley's Orchestra and Chorus)	91	—	—	—	17	—
1963	"Baby Come Home To Me"	131	—	—	—	—	—
1963	"I'm The Boss" (With Owen Bradley's Orchestra And Chorus)	111	—	—	86	—	—
1963	"This Is All I Ask"	67	—	—	—	—	—
1963	"It Comes And Goes"	124	—	—	94	—	—
1963	"True Love Goes On And On" (second entry)	66	—	—	—	—	—
1964	"Pearly Shells (Popo O Ewa)" (With Owen Bradley's Orchestra)	60	12	—	22	—	—
1965	"My Gal Sal" (with Owen Bradley's Orchestra)	122	—	—	—	18	—
1965	"Chim Chim Cher-ee"	120	—	—	—	6	—
1966	"Evil Off My Mind"	—	—	47	—	—	—
1967	"Lonesome 7-7203"	—	—	72	—	—	—
1968	"I'll Be Your Baby Tonight" (with Robert Mersey's Orchestra)	133	35	—	28	—	—
1970	"One More Time Billy Brown"	—	—	—	—	25	—

=== Holiday 100 chart entries ===
Since many radio stations in the US adopt a format change to Christmas music each December, many holiday hits have an annual spike in popularity during the last few weeks of the year and are retired once the season is over. In December 2011, Billboard began a Holiday Songs chart with 50 positions that monitors the last five weeks of each year to "rank the top holiday hits of all eras using the same methodology as the Hot 100, blending streaming, airplay, and sales data", and in 2013 the number of positions on the chart was doubled, resulting in the Holiday 100. Two Ives recordings have made appearances on the Holiday 100 and are noted below according to the holiday season in which they charted there.

Title	Holiday season peak chart positions															Album
Title	2011	2012	2013	2014	2015	2016	2017	2018	2019	2020	2021	2022	2023	2024	2025	Album
"A Holly Jolly Christmas"	6	5	5	8	4	7	4	4	3	4	3	4	5	5	12	Have a Holly Jolly Christmas
"Rudolph, the Red-Nosed Reindeer"	38	—	67	31	41	29	50	48	46	57	49	40	42	49	44	Have a Holly Jolly Christmas

=== Other singles (selected) ===
- "Foggy, Foggy Dew / "Rodger Young" (1945, 10 in., 78 rpm, Decca 23405)
- "Grandfather Kringle" / "The Twelve Days of Christmas" (1951, 10 in., 78 rpm, Columbia MJV-124)
- "Great White Bird" / "Brighten The Corner Where You Are" (1953, 7 in., 45 rpm, Decca 28849)
- "That's My Heart Strings" / "The Bus Stop Song" (1956, 7 in., 45 rpm, Decca 30046)
- "We Loves Ye Jimmy" / "I Never See Maggie Alone" (1959, 7 in., 45 rpm, Decca 30855)
- "A Little Bitty Tear" / "Shanghied" (1961, 7 in., 45 rpm, Decca 31330)
- "Funny Way of Laughin'" / "Mother Wouldn't Do That" (1962, 7 in., 45 rpm, Decca 31371)
- "Call Me Mr. In-Between" / "What You Gonna Do, Leroy?" (1962, 7 in., 45 rpm, Decca 31405)
- "Mary Ann Regrets / "How Do You Fall Out Of Love?" (1962, 7 in., 45 rpm, Decca 31433)
- "The Twelve Days of Christmas" / "Indian Christmas Carol" (1962, 7 in., 45 rpm, Decca 25585)
- "I'm The Boss" / "The Moon Is High" (1963, 7 in., 45 rpm, Decca 31504)
- "True Love Goes On And On" / "I Wonder What's Become Of Sally" (1963, 7 in., 45 rpm, Decca 31571)
- "On The Front Porch" / "Ugly Bug Ball" (1963, 7 in., 45 rpm, Buena Vista 419)
- "Four Initials On A Tree" / "This Is Your Day" (1964, 7 in., 45 rpm, Decca 31610)
- "Pearly Shells" / "What Little Tears Are Made Of" (1964, 7 in., 45 rpm, Decca 31659)
- "Salt Water Guitar" / "The Story of Bobby Lee Trent" (1964, 7 in., 45 rpm, Decca 31811)
- "A Holly Jolly Christmas" / "Snow for Johnny" (1965, 7 in., 45 rpm, Decca 31695)
- "Evil Off My Mind" / "Taste of Heaven" (c. 1967, 7 in., 45 rpm, Decca 31997)
- "Lonesome 7-7203" / "Hollow Words" (1967, 7 in., 45 rpm, Decca 32078)
- "That's Where My Baby Used To Be "/ "Bury The Bottle With Me" (1968, 7 in., 45 rpm, Decca 32282)
- "I'll Be Your Baby Tonight" / "Maria, If I Could" (1968, 7 in., 45 rpm, Columbia 4-44508)
- "Santa Mouse" / "Oh, What A Lucky Boy I Am" (1968, 7 in., 45 rpm, Columbia 4-44711)
- "Gingerbread House" / "Tumbleweed Snowman" (c. 1970, 7 in. 45 rpm, Big Tree BT-130)
- "One More Time Billy Brown" / "Tied Down Here At Home" (1970, 7 in. 45 rpm, Cyclone 75014, #25 CAN)
- "The Best Is Yet To Come" & "Stayin' Song" / "Blue Tail Fly" (1972, 7 in., 45 rpm, MCA 1921)
- "Mrs. Johnson's Happiness Emporium" / "Anytime You Say" (1973, 7 in., 45 rpm, Decca 33049)
- "The Tail Of The Comet Kohoutek" / "A Very Fine Lady" (1974, 7 in., 45 rpm, MCA 40175)
- "It's Gonna Be A Mixed Up Christmas" / "The Christmas Legend Of Monkey Joe" (1978, 7 in., 45 & 33 1/3 rpm, Monkey Joe MJ1)
- "The Night Before Christmas" / Instrumental (1986, 7 in., 45 rpm, Stillman/Teague STP-1013)

== Radio work (selected) ==
- Back Where I Came From, CBS (September 30, 1940 – February 28, 1941)
- The Wayfarin' Stranger, CBS & WOR (1941–1942, 1946–1948)
- Burl Ives Coffee Club, CBS (July 5, 1941 – January 24, 1942)
- The Columbia Workshop, CBS
  - "Roadside" (March 2, 1941)
  - "The Log Of The R-77," second installment Of Twenty-Six By Corwin (May 11, 1941)
  - "The People, Yes," third installment of Twenty-Six By Corwin (May 18, 1941)
  - "A Child's History Of Hot Music" (March 15, 1942)
- GI Jive, military radio (c. 1943)
- Columbia Presents Corwin, CBS
  - "The Lonesome Train" (March 21, 1944)
  - "El Capitan And The Corporal" (July 25, 1944)
- The Theatre Guild On The Air, ABC
  - "Sing Out, Sweet Land" (October 21, 1945)
- Hollywood Star Time, CBS
  - "The Return Of Frank James" (March 10, 1946)
- The Burl Ives Show, Syndication (1946–1948)
- Hollywood Fights Back, ABC (November 2, 1947)
- The Kaiser Traveler, ABC (July 24 – September 4, 1949)
- Burl Ives Sings, Syndication (1950s)

== Theater appearances (selected) ==
- Pocahontas Preferred (1935–1936)
- I Married An Angel (1938)
- The Boys From Syracuse (November 23, 1938 – June 10, 1939)
- Heavenly Express (April 18 – May 4, 1940)
- This Is The Army (July 4 – September 26, 1942)
- Sing Out Sweet Land (December 27, 1944 – March 24, 1945)
- She Stoops To Conquer (1950)
- Knickerbocker Holiday (1950)
- The Man Who Came To Dinner (1951)
- Paint Your Wagon (November 12, 1951 – July 19, 1952)
- Show Boat (1954)
- Cat On A Hot Tin Roof (March 24, 1955 – November 17, 1956)
- Dr. Cook's Garden (September 25–30, 1967)

== Filmography (selected) ==
=== Television ===
- Playhouse 90: The Miracle Worker (1957) – Captain Keller
- Zane Grey Theater "The Ox" (1960) – Jonathan J. Dwire
- Rudolph The Red-Nosed Reindeer (1964) – Sam The Snowman (voice)
- O.K. Crackerby! (1965–1966) – O.K. Crackerby
- Pinocchio (1968) – Geppetto
- Daniel Boone "A Tall Tale Of Prater Beasely" (1969) – Prater Beaseley
- The Bold Ones: The Lawyers (1969–1972) – Walter Nicholls
- Alias Smith and Jones "The McCreedy Bust" (1971–1972) – Big Mac McCreedy
- Night Gallery "The Other Way Out" (1972) – Old Man Doubleday
- The First Easter Rabbit (1976) – Old Stuffy (G.B.) (voice)
- Captains and the Kings (1976) – Old Syrup
- Little House on the Prairie "The Hunters" (1976) – Samuel Shelby
- Roots (1977)
- The Bermuda Depths (1978) – Paulis
- The New Adventures of Heidi (1978) – Grandfather
- Caravan of Courage: An Ewok Adventure (1984) – Narrator (voice)

=== Films ===
- Smoky (1946) – Willie
- Green Grass of Wyoming (1948) – Gus
- Station West (1948) – Hotel Clerk
- So Dear to My Heart (1948) – Uncle Hiram Douglas
- Sierra (1950) – Lonesome
- East of Eden (1955) – Samuel The Sheriff
- The Power and the Prize (1956) – George Salt
- A Face in the Crowd (1957) – Himself (uncredited)
- Desire Under the Elms (1958) – Ephraim Cabot
- Wind Across The Everglades (1958) – Cottonmouth
- Cat on a Hot Tin Roof (1958) – Big Daddy Pollitt
- The Big Country (1958) – Rufus Hannassey
- Day of the Outlaw (1959) – Jack Bruhn
- Our Man in Havana (1959) – Dr. Hasselbacher
- Let No Man Write My Epitaph (1960) – Judge Bruce Mallory Sullivan
- The Spiral Road (1962) – Dr. Brits Jansen
- Summer Magic (1963) – Osh Popham
- The Brass Bottle (1964) – Fakrash
- Ensign Pulver (1964) – Captain Morton
- The Daydreamer (1966) – Father Neptune (voice)
- Jules Verne's Rocket to the Moon (1967) – Phineas T. Barnum
- The Other Side of Bonnie and Clyde (1968) – Narrator (voice)
- The McMasters (1970) – McMasters
- The Heart Farm (1973)
- Hugo the Hippo (1975) – Narrator (voice)
- Baker's Hawk (1976) – Mr. McGraw
- Just You and Me, Kid (1979) – Max
- Earthbound (1981) – Ned Anderson
- White Dog (1982) – Carruthers
- Uphill All the Way (1986) – Sheriff John Catledge
- Two Moon Junction (1988) – Sheriff Earl Hawkins

=== Theme parks ===
- America Sings (1974–1988) – Sam

== Concerts (selected) ==
- Royal Windsor, New York City, April 28, 1939
- Town Hall, New York City, December 1, 1945
- Opera House, San Francisco, February 9, 1949
- Columbia University, New York City, October 19, 1950
- Royal Festival Hall, London, May 10, 1952
- Albert Hall, London, October 20, 1976
- Reuben F. Scarf's house, Sydney, Australia, GROW Party, 1977.
- Royal Philharmonic Hall, Liverpool, 1979, accompanying The Spinners
- Chautauqua, New York, 1982 (VHS)
- Eastern Illinois University, Charleston, Illinois, April 27, 1990
- Brodniak Hall, Anacortes, Washington, 1991 (VHS)
- Mt. Vernon, Washington, February 1993 (VHS)
- Folksong U.S.A., 92nd Street Y, New York City, May 17, 1993

== Bibliography ==
- The Wayfarin' Stranger: A Collection of 21 Folk Songs and Ballads with Guitar and Piano Accompaniment. New York: Leeds Music, 1945.
- Wayfaring Stranger. New York: Whittlesey House, 1948 (autobiography)
- Favorite Folk Ballads of Burl Ives: A Collection of 17 Folk Songs and Ballads with Guitar and Piano Accompaniment. New York: Leeds Music, 1949
- Burl Ives Song Book. New York: Ballantine Books, 1953
- Sailing on a Very Fine Day. Chicago: Rand McNally, 1954 (Children's picture book)
- Burl Ives Folio of Australian Songs, collected and arranged by Percy Jones, 1954.
- Song in America: Our Musical Heritage, co-authored with Albert Hague. New York: Duell, Sloan and Pearce, n.d.
- Tales of America. Cleveland: World Publishing, 1954
- "Introduction" to Paul Kapp's A Cat Came Fiddling and Other Rhymes of Childhood, New York: Harcourt Brace, 1956
- The Ghost and Hans Van Duin [excerpt from Tales of America]. Pittsburgh: Carnegie Institute of Technology, 1956
- Sea Songs of Sailing, Whaling, and Fishing. New York: Ballantine Books, 1956
- Irish Songs (edited by Michael Bowles). New York: Duell, Sloan & Pearce, c. 1958
- The Wayfaring Stranger's Notebook. Indianapolis, Bobbs-Merrill, 1962
- The Burl Ives Sing-Along Song Book: A Treasury of American Folk Songs & Ballads, 1963
- Albad the Oaf. London: Abelard-Schuman, 1965
- More Burl Ives Songs. New York: Ballantine Books, 1966
- Sing a Fun Song. New York: Southern Music Publishing, 1968
- Burl Ives: Four Folk Song and Four Stories, co-authored with Barbara Hazen. N.p.: CBS Records, 1969
- Spoken Arts Treasury of American Ballads and Folk Songs, co-authored with Arthur Klein and Helen Ives, n.d.
- Easy Guitar Method. Dayton, Ohio : Heritage Music Press, 1975
- We Americans: A Musical Journey with Burl Ives. Washington, D.C.: National Geographic Society, 1978 (pamphlet)
- "Foreword" to Martin Scot Kosins's Maya's First Rose. West Bloomfield, MI: Altweger and Mandel Publishing, 1991
- Angels We Have Heard: The Christmas Song Stories, written by James Adam Richliano. Chatham, New York: Star Of Bethlehem Books, 2002. (Includes a chapter on Ives' involvement in the making of "A Holly Jolly Christmas", along with an interview with his wife, Dorothy Ives.

== See also ==
- Songs for Victory: Music for Political Action with the Union Boys (1944)
