= Historical America in Song =

Studio album Album Set by Burl Ives
- Released: 1950
- Genre: Folk
- Label: Encyclopædia Britannica Films

Historical America in Song, released in 1950 by Encyclopædia Britannica Films, is an album set by folk singer Burl Ives. Each of the six albums consists of five 12-inch vinylite records, for a total of thirty 78 rpm records. Each album has its own cover with a drawing of the Washington Monument on it (see the illustration).

The album set was designed to be used in four types of academic courses: music appreciation, American history, literature, and social studies. Each song was selected and is introduced by Ives. The introductions "establish the songs in mood, time, and place" and "point up the significance of the songs and highlight their most important elements."

The following albums make up the set: Songs of the Colonies, Songs of the Revolution, Songs of North and South, Songs of the Sea, Songs of the Frontier, and Songs of Expanding America.

== Songs of the Colonies ==
=== Track listing ===
Record 1, Side 1 (B.I.301)

1. "Psalm 3"
2. "Confess Jehovah"
3. "Mother Goose Songs"

Record 1, Side 2 (B.I.302)

1. "Little Mohee"
2. "The Tailor and the Mouse"

Record 2, Side 3 (B.I.303)

1. "Barbara Allen"

Record 2, Side 4 (B.I.304)

1. "Lord Thomas"
2. "Robin He Married"

Record 3, Side 5 (B.I.305)

1. "Lord Randall"
2. "The Bold Soldier"

Record 3, Side 6 (B.I.306)

1. "Edward"
2. "Black Is the Color"

Record 4, Side 7 (B.I.307)

1. "The Squire’s Son"
2. "The Riddle Song"

Record 4, Side 8 (B.I.308)

1. "Foggy, Foggy Dew"
2. "The Fox"

Record 5, Side 9 (B.I.309)

1. "Brennan on the Moor"
2. "Billy Boy"

Record 5, Side 10 (B.I.310)

1. "Queen Jane"
2. "Turtle Dove"

== Songs of the Revolution ==
=== Track listing ===
Label on Side 2 of Songs of the Revolution

Record 1, Side 1 (B.I.311)

1. "The Escape of John Webb"
2. "I Know Where I'm Going"

Record 1, Side 2 (B.I.312)

1. "My Days Have Been So Wondrous Free"
2. "On Springfield Mountain"
3. "Chester"

Record 2, Side 3 (B.I.313)

1. "What a Court Hath Old England"
2. "Ballad of the Tea Party"
3. "The Boston Tea Tax"

Record 2, Side 4 (B.I.314)

1. "White Cockade"
2. "Free America"
3. Johnny Has Gone for a Soldier

Record 3, Side 5 (B.I.315)

1. "Yankee Doodle"
2. "Riflemen’s Song at Bennington"

Record 3, Side 6 (B.I.316)

1. "The Battle of the Kegs"

Record 4, Side 7 (B.I.317)

1. "Battle of Saratoga"

Record 4, Side 8 (B.I.318)

1. "Cornwallis Country Dance"
2. "Sir Peter Parker"

Record 5, Side 9 (B.I.319)

1. "Yankee Man O’War"

Record 5, Side 10 (B.I.320)

1. "Skip to My Lou"
2. "Careless Love"
3. "Wayfaring Stranger"

== Songs of North and South ==
=== Track listing ===
1. "Ye Parliaments of England"
2. "The Constitution and the Guerriere"
3. "Patriotic Diggers"
4. "Hunters of Kentucky"
5. "The Hornet and the Peacock"
6. "Hey Betty Martin"
7. "Old Dan Tucker"
8. "Blue Tail Fly"
9. "The Abolitionist Hymn"
10. "Nicodemus"
11. "Old Abe Lincoln"
12. "All Quiet along the Potomac Tonight"
13. "John Brown"
14. "Dixie"
15. "Bonnie Blue Flag"
16. "Goober Peas"
17. "The Battle of Bull Run"
18. "Johnny Comes Marching Home"
19. "Lorena"
20. "Keemo-Kimo"
21. "Beautiful Dreamer"
22. "Were You There When They Crucified My Lord?"
23. "Burying Ground"
24. "Nobody Knows the Trouble I've Seen"

== Songs of the Sea ==
=== Track listing ===
1. "Golden Vanity"
2. "High Barbaree"
3. "Maid of Amsterdam"
4. "Henry Martin"
5. "Hullabaloo Baley"
6. "Blow the Man Down"
7. "Blow Ye Winds"
8. "Away Rio"
9. "The Whale"
10. "Sacramento"
11. "Crocodile Song"
12. "Early in the Morning"
13. "Boston Come All Ye"
14. "Haul Away Joe"
15. "Venezuela"
16. "Shenandoah"
17. "Erie Canal"
18. "Eddystone Light"

== Songs of the Frontier ==
=== Track listing ===
1. "Ox-Driving Song"
2. "Sweet Betsy from Pike"
3. "Dreary Black Hills"
4. "Peter Gray"
5. "Sioux Indians"
6. "Joe Bowers"
7. "What Was Your Name in the States"
8. "Buffalo Gals"
9. "Greer County Bachelor"
10. "Roving Gambler"
11. "Chisholm Trail"
12. "Old Paint"
13. "Sod Shanty"
14. "Git Along, Little Dogies"
15. "The Young Man who Wouldn’t Hoe Corn"
16. "I’ve Got No Use for Women"
17. "The Hand-Cart Song"
18. "Brigham Young"

== Songs of Expanding America ==
=== Track listing ===
1. "Streets of Laredo"
2. "Billy the Kid"
3. "John Hardy"
4. "Jesse James"
5. "Drill Ye Tarriers"
6. "Blue Mountain Lake"
7. "Patrick on the Railroad"
8. "The Dying Hogger"
9. "John Henry"
10. "Down in the Valley"
11. "When I Was Single"
12. "Sourwood Mountain"
13. "Cotton-Eyed Joe"
14. "Cowboy’s Dream"
15. "Life Is Like a Mountain Railroad"
16. "Poor Boy"
17. "Old Blue"
18. "Midnight Special"
19. "Big Rock Candy Mountain"
20. "The Boll Weevil"
21. "St. John’s River"

== Release ==
The set was selling for $59.50 in 1951 or $10.95 per album.
