= The Wayfaring Stranger =

The Wayfaring Stranger may refer to:

- "The Wayfaring Stranger" (song), also called "Poor Wayfaring Stranger," a folk song
- The Wayfaring Stranger, a nickname for Burl Ives
- Okeh Presents the Wayfaring Stranger, an album by Burl Ives that was released in 1941, 1944 and 1950
- The Wayfaring Stranger (album), a different album by Burl Ives that was released on Asch in 1944
- Wayfaring Stranger (Jeremy Steig album), 1971
- The Wayfaring Strangers, self-titled 2001 album by an acoustic music group featuring Matt Glaser, Tony Trischka, Andy Statman and Bruce Barth
- Wayfaring Stranger (Andreas Scholl album) 2001
- Wayfaring Strangers: The Musical Voyage from Scotland and Ulster to Appalachia, a book by Fiona Ritchie and Doug Orr (2014)
