= Burl Ives Presents America's Musical Heritage =

Studio album Album Set by Burl Ives
- Released: 1963
- Genre: Folk
- Label: Longines Symphonette Society

Burl Ives Presents America's Musical Heritage, released in 1963 by the Longines Symphonette Society, is a six-album box set by folk singer Burl Ives. It is subtitled 114 Best Loved Songs & Ballads for Listening, Singing, and Reading and includes a 168-page book, titled The Burl Ives Sing-Along Song Book, which presents the lyrics for all of the songs and historical background about some of the songs.

Many of the songs can be found on Ives' six-album set Historical America in Song, released by Encyclopædia Britannica Films in 1950. The two sets are not identical, however. For example, while there is considerable overlapping between New Ballads and two of the albums in the 1950 set, there is almost no overlapping between Tales for Singing and the earlier set. The duplicated songs on the 1963 set seem to be fresh recordings. Certainly the sound is better on the six LPs that comprise the 1963 set than on the thirty 78 rpm records that make up the 1950 set.

== Tales for Singing: Our English Inheritance (LW 194) ==
=== Track listing ===
Side 1

Track	Song Title
1.	The Gallows Tree
2.	The Keys of Canterbury
3.	Billy Boy
4.	My Boy Willie
5.	The Wee Cooper O' Fife
6.	Three Crows
7.	Barb'ry Allen
8.	Sweet Kitty Klover
9.	Mr. Froggie Went A-Courtin

Side 2

Track	Song Title
1.	Edward
2.	Waly, Waly
3.	Gypsy's Wedding Day
4.	Lily Munro
5.	Widdicomb Fair
6.	How Happy the Soldier
7.	One Morning in May
8.	Two Maidens Went Milking

== New Ballads: Reporting the American Revolution & War of 1812 (LW 195) ==
=== Track listing ===
Side 1

Cover of the book that comes with the album set

Track	Song Title
1.	Captain Kidd
2.	The Escape of Old John Webb
3.	Free America
4.	The Boston Tea Party
5.	Johnny Has Gone for a Soldier
6.	The Riflemen's Song at Bennington
7.	The Battle of Saratoga
8.	Sir Pete Parker
9.	Cornwallis Country Dance

Side 2

Track	Song Title
1.	The Yankee Man-o-War
2.	High Barbaree
3.	The Constitution and the Guerriere
4.	The Hornet and the Peacock
5.	Ye Parliaments of England
6.	Patriotic Diggers
7.	Hunters of Kentucky

== Traveling Songs: Sailing Free and Adventuring West (LW 196) ==
=== Track listing ===
Side 1

Track	Song Title
1.	Home Boys Home
2.	Shenandoah
3.	Song of the Fishes
4.	Blow ye Winds
5.	Greenland Fisheries
6.	Rollin' Home
7.	Blow the Man Down

Side 2

Track	Song Title
1.	Sacramento
2.	A Ripping Trip
3.	Ox-Driver's Song
4.	The Hand Cart Song
5.	Sweet Betsy from Pike
6.	Come Yourselves and See
7.	The Shady Old Camp
8.	Joe Bowers

== Heart Songs: American Folk Creations (LW 197) ==
=== Track listing ===
Side 1

Track	Song Title
1.	Lolly Tu Dum
2.	Down in the Valley
3.	The Sow Took the Measles
4.	Old Bangam
5.	Mr. Rabbit
6.	Hush Little Baby
7.	Sourwood Mountain
8.	Old Blue
9.	Poor Little Turtle Dove
10.	Careless Love

Side 2

Track	Song Title
1.	John Henry
2.	Buckeye Jim
3.	The Leather-Winged Bat
4.	Cotton-Eyed Joe
5.	Darlin' Cory
6.	Turkey in the Straw
7.	I'm Goin' Away
8.	Needle Eye
9.	Go in and out the Window
10.	Saturday Night and Sunday Too
11.	Frankie and Johnny

== Popular Songs: Music Hall and Battlefield 1800-1865 (LW 198) ==
=== Track listing ===
Side 1

Track	Song Title
1.	Unfornate Miss Bailey
2.	The Pesky Sarpint
3.	On Springfield Mountain
4.	Long, Long Ago
5.	Ben Bolt
6.	Oh You New York Girls
7.	The Blue Tail Fly
8.	Uncle Ned
9.	Darli' Nelly Gray
10.	Wake Nicodemus
11.	The Abolitionist Hymn

Side 2

Track	Song Title
1.	Nobody Knows the Trouble I've Seen
2.	John Brown
3.	The Battle Cry of Freedom
4.	Just before the Battle Mother
5.	Tramp, Tramp, Tramp
6.	When Johnny Comes Marching Home
7.	All Quiet along the Potomac
8.	Goober Peas
9.	The Bonnie Blue Flag
10.	The Battle of Bull Run
11.	Little Brown Jug
12.	Grandfather's Clock

== The Big Country: Cowboys, Indians, Badmen and Settlers (LW 199) ==
=== Track listing ===
Side 1

Label and sleeve of LW 199

Track	Song Title
1.	The Roving Gambler
2.	Billy the Kid
3.	Jesse James
4.	John Hardy
5.	Midnight Special
6.	Sioux Indians
7.	Patrick on the Railroad
8.	The Utah Iron Horse
9.	What Was Your Name in the States
10.	The Lavender Cowboy
11.	The Cowboy's Lament

Side 2

Track	Song Title
1.	The Old Chisholm Trail
2.	Old Paint
3.	Git along Little Doggies
4.	Oh Susanna
5.	Green Grow the Lilacs
6.	Little Old Sod Shanty
7.	The Young Man Who Wouldn't Hoe Corn
8.	Home on the Range
9.	Red River Valley
10.	Big Rock Candy Mountain
11.	Goin' Down the Road Feelin' Bad
