= Songs of the West (Burl Ives album) =

Studio album by Burl Ives
- Released: 1961
- Genre: Country Western
- Length: 32:23
- Label: Decca

Songs of the West (Decca DL 4179, 1961) is one of the several albums from the early 1960s that signalled Burl Ives's move away from folk music into country western and pop. In Ives's discography this album is immediately preceded by The Versatile Burl Ives! and followed by It's Just My Funny Way of Laughin', two Decca albums containing songs ("A Little Bitty Tear", "Call Mr. In-Between" and "Funny Way of Laughin'") that earned Ives his highest rankings on Billboard's pop, country, and easy-listening charts.

Songs of the West is an album of twelve "Cowboy" songs. As the back of the album cover states, "[The songs] span the gamut of western music from the time-honored Cowboy's National Anthem, 'Home on the Range,' which dates back to the 1870s, through the western classics ..., to the years of western music's peak popularity -- represented here by songs by Billy Hill ... -- and finally on to 'My Adobe Hacienda' and 'Jingle Jangle Jingle,' two popular hits that have been adopted into the repertoires of almost all western music enthusiasts."

== Track listing ==
=== Side 1 ===
Track	Song Title	Writer/Composer	Length
1.	Home on the Range	Brewster Higley, Daniel Kelley	2:26
2.	When the Bloom Is on the Sage	Nat Vincent, Fred Howard Wright	2:10
3.	Cool Water	Bob Nolan	3:54
4.	Empty Saddles	Billy Hill	2:39
5.	Mexicali Rose	Helen Stone, Jack Tenney	2:25
6.	The Oregon Trail	Peter de Rose, Billy Hill	2:31

=== Side 2 ===
Track	Song Title	Writer/Composer	Length
1.	The Last Round-Up	Billy Hill	4:02
2.	O Bury Me Not on the Lone Prairie	Traditional	2:19
3.	Cowboy's Dream	Traditional	2:58
4.	Tumbling Tumbleweeds	Bob Nolan	2:14
5.	My Adobe Hacienda	Louise Massey, Lee Penny	2:27
6.	Jingle Jangle Jingle	J.J. Lilley, Frank Loesser	2:13
