= I Know Where I'm Going =

I Know Where I'm Going may refer to:

- "I Know Where I'm Going" (folk song), a folk song
- I Know Where I'm Going!, a 1945 film
- "I Know Where I'm Going" (The Judds song), a 1987 number one country hit by The Judds
