= Wayfaring Stranger (Andreas Scholl album) =

Studio album by Andreas Scholl Orpheus Chamber Orchestra Edin Karamazov
- Released: 2001
- Genre: Folk, classical
- Label: Decca

Wayfaring Stranger is a 2001 album of English-language folksongs by the German countertenor Andreas Scholl.

== Track list ==
1. I am a poor wayfaring stranger
2. The Salley Gardens
3. My Love Is Like A Red, Red Rose
4. Wild Mountain Thyme
5. Henry Martin
6. Charming Beauty Bright
7. I Will Give my Love an Apple
8. She Moved Through the Fair
9. Blow the Wind Southerly
10. The Wife of Usher's Well
11. I Loved a Lass
12. Pretty Saro
13. Down in Yon Forest
14. Barbara Allen
15. The wraggle taggle gypsies, o!
16. Annie Laurie
17. Black is the Colour

== Weblinks ==
album on Youtube
