= Songs of the West =

Songs of the West may refer to:

- Songs of the West (Burl Ives album)
- Songs of the West (Emmylou Harris album)
