= If I Cried Every Time You Hurt Me =

Single by Wanda Jackson

from the album Wonderful Wanda
- B-side: "Let My Love Walk In"
- Released: March 1962
- Recorded: February 1962
- Studio: Bradley Film and Recording Studio
- Genre: Country
- Length: 2:32
- Label: Capitol
- Songwriter: Harlan Howard
- Producer: Ken Nelson

Wanda Jackson singles chronology
"A Little Bitty Tear" (1961)	"If I Cried Every Time You Hurt Me" (1962)	"I Misunderstood" (1962)

"If I Cried Every Time You Hurt Me" is a song written by Harlan Howard that was originally recorded by American Rockabilly and Country artist Wanda Jackson. It was released as a single in 1962 via Capitol Records and was issued on her album titled Wonderful Wanda. The song reached chart positions on the American country, pop and adult contemporary charts following its release.

== Background and content ==
For several years, Wanda Jackson performed as a Rockabilly artist and had singles with songs like "Fujiyama Mama" and the top 40 pop hit "Let's Have a Party". In the early 1960s, she returned back to the country market and recorded a series of singles that became commercially-successful. "If I Cried Every Time You Hurt Me" was released during the same period. It followed Jackson's previous single ("A Little Bitty Tear"), which did not perform well on radio and had received backlash with a similar single version by Burl Ives. "If I Cried Every Time You Hurt Me" was composed by Harlan Howard and was recorded in February 1962 at the Bradley Film and Recording Studio. The session was produced by Ken Nelson.

== Release and reception ==
"If I Cried Every Time You Hurt Me" was released as a single in March 1962 on Capitol Records. It was backed on the B-side by the track "Let My Love Walk In". It was the third single issued from Jackson's studio album, Wonderful Wanda. The disc spent one week on the Billboard Hot Country Songs chart, peaking at number 28 in June 1962. It was Jackson's third charting country single since 1961. The disc also spent eight weeks on the Billboard Hot 100, climbing to number 58 around the same period. It also spent six weeks on the Billboard adult contemporary chart, reaching number 16 in May 1962. It was Jackson's second single to reach a charting position there. Steve Leggett of AllMusic gave the song a positive response upon reviewing Jackson's Greatest Hits compilation collection, calling it a "world-weary gem[s]".

== Track listing ==
7" vinyl single

- "If I Cried Every Time You Hurt Me" – 2:32
- "Let My Love Walk In" – 2:15

== Charts ==
Chart (1962)	Peak position
US Adult Contemporary (Billboard)	16
US Billboard Hot 100	58
US Hot Country Songs (Billboard)	28
