= Sam Sackett =

American professor and writer (1928–2018)

Samuel John Sackett
- Born: January 23, 1928; Redlands, California, U.S.
- Died: March 29, 2018 (aged 90)
- Education: University of Redlands; University of California, Los Angeles
- Occupations: Educator and writer
- Spouse: Suwapee "Susie" Sackett

Samuel John Sackett (January 23, 1928 – March 2018), alternately Sam Sackett or S.J. Sackett, was an American literary scholar, folklorist, and writer.

== Early life and education ==
Sackett was born in Redlands, California in 1928 and graduated from Redlands High School in 1945. He received his A.B. from the University of Redlands in 1948 and his A.M. from the same institution in 1949. He subsequently attended the University of California, Los Angeles, receiving his Ph.D. in English in 1956. At UCLA, he specialized in English literature of the Neoclassical period and in the history of literary criticism; his dissertation was titled, The Place of Literary Theory in Henry Fielding's Art.

While a student, he was involved in the science fiction fandom and associated with literary figures such as Ray Bradbury, A. E. Van Vogt, Forrest Ackerman, Henry Kuttner, and Clark Ashton Smith.

== Career ==
From 1949 to 1951, Sackett taught English and journalism at Hastings College in Nebraska. He then took a hiatus from teaching to earn his Ph.D. at UCLA, after which he served as a professor of English at Fort Hays State University, for 23 years. During his tenure at Fort Hays State, Sackett published a translation of a Flemish novel, a collection of Kansas folklore and a critical study of E.W. Howe. He also wrote Cowboys and the Songs They Sang, a children's book that was published in 1967. Additionally, Sackett founded and served as president of the Kansas Folklore Society and was co-editor with William E. Koch of Kansas State University of Kansas Folklore, as well as Book Review Editor of Western Folklore magazine. In the 1970s he was faculty advisor for the university literary publication: The Passionate Few. After leaving Fort Hays State, Sackett worked briefly as a freelance writer and newspaper reporter.

In 1980, he moved to Oklahoma and was hired as the Director of Creative Services for an advertising agency in Weatherford. It was there that he married his wife, Suwapee Sackett, a native of Thailand. After their marriage, Sackett joined a career management firm in Oklahoma City as a Senior Associate, next becoming Vice President of another Oklahoma City career management company and, finally, Vice President of the Oklahoma City office of Bernard Haldane Associates, where he remained for twelve years. While living in Oklahoma City Dr. Sackett also taught English and ESL classes at several universities.

In 2003, Sackett, retired to Ayutthaya, Thailand where he taught English and wrote short stories which were subsequently collected into two books, Through Farang Eyes and Snapshots of Thailand. Sackett's third volume of short stories, Chamberlain Stories, focuses on his time teaching in Kansas.

In 2009, Sackett and his wife returned to the United States to live in rural Canton, Oklahoma. Following their return, his first book, Sweet Betsy from Pike was published. Sackett had heard the song, Sweet Betsy from Pike, at an American Folklore Society meeting and, "it struck him that Betsy learned she couldn't trust sweet-talking Ike to take care of her and that she had the strength to take care of herself."

Ever since reading Howard Pyle's The Merry Adventures of Robin Hood in the fifth grade, Sackett had wondered about the truth behind the traditional legend. Answering that question resulted in his second book, The Robin Hood Chronicles, a different take on the story.

Adolf Hitler in Oz, Sackett's third novel, which he called "a children's book for adults," grew out of his, "belief that goodness and love, symbolized in the novel as the Land of Oz, will always overcome evil and hate, symbolized by Hitler." In addition, Sackett's interest in the psychological theories of Carl Rogers helped to shape the book.

Sackett also wrote a sequel to Mark Twain's Adventures of Huckleberry Finn, entitled Huckleberry Finn Grows Up. Twain was one of Sackett's favorite authors.

== Partial Bibliography ==
=== Fiction ===
==== Books ====
- Rabbi Yeshua (2013)
- Huckleberry Finn Grows Up (2012)
- Adolf Hitler in Oz (2011)
- The Robin Hood Chronicles (2010)
- Sweet Betsy from Pike (2009)

==== Children's books ====
- Cowboys and the Songs They Sang (1967)

==== Short fiction ====
- Ali Cat in Oz (2018) [with Joe Bongiorno]
- The Wizard in New York (2018)
- The Horsemen (1953)

==== Short fiction collections ====
- Chamberlain Stories (2014)
- Snapshots of Thailand (2014)
- Through Farang Eyes (2014)

=== Scholarship ===
==== Books ====
- Edgar Watson Howe (1972)
- Cowboys and the Songs They Sang (1967)
- Kansas Folklore (1961; editor)

==== Articles ====
- Jesse James as Robin Hood (1980–1981)
- A New English Curriculum for the Small College (1979)
- Simile in Folksong (1963)
- Folk Speech in Schoenchen, Kansas (1960)
- The Utopia of Oz (1960)
- German Proverbs from around Fort Hays, Kansas (1959)
