= Crooked Creek Township, Jasper County, Illinois =

Crooked Creek Township
- Township
- Location in Jasper County

- Jasper County's location in Illinois
- Coordinates: 39°07′05″N 88°07′54″W
- Country: United States
- State: Illinois
- County: Jasper
- Established: November 8, 1859

Area
  - Total: 55.91 sq mi (144.8 km^{2})
  - Land: 55.91 sq mi (144.8 km^{2})
  - Water: 0 sq mi (0 km^{2}) 0%
- Elevation: 554 ft (169 m)

Population (2020)
  - Total: 697
  - Density: 12.5/sq mi (4.81/km^{2})
- Time zone: UTC-6 (CST)
  - Summer (DST): UTC-5 (CDT)
- ZIP codes: 62428, 62432, 62436, 62448, 62481
- FIPS code: 17-079-17653

Crooked Creek Township is one of eleven townships in Jasper County, Illinois, USA. As of the 2020 census, its population was 697 and it contained 319 housing units.

== Geography ==
According to the 2021 census gazetteer files, Crooked Creek Township has a total area of 55.91 square miles (144.81 km^{2}), all land.

=== Cities, towns, villages ===
- Hidalgo
- Rose Hill

=== Unincorporated towns ===
- Plainfield at 39.103652°N 88.135316°W
- Point Pleasant at 39.155595°N 88.077814°W

(This list is based on USGS data and may include former settlements.)

=== Adjacent townships ===
- Greenup Township, Cumberland County (north)
- Grandville Township (east)
- Hunt City Township (southeast)
- Wade Township (southwest)
- Grove Township (west)

=== Cemeteries ===
The township contains these sixteen cemeteries: Andrews, Aten, Brooks, Brown, Coad, Harrisburg, Hayes, Hidalgo, Hunt/Cummins, Kilgore, Plainfield, Ross, Songer, Swick, Swick Family and Ward.

=== Major highways ===
- Illinois Route 130

== Demographics ==
Historical population
Census	Pop.	Note	%±
2000	748		—
2010	721		−3.6%
2020	697		−3.3%
U.S. Decennial Census

As of the 2020 census there were 697 people, 322 households, and 235 families residing in the township. The population density was 12.47 inhabitants per square mile (4.81/km^{2}). There were 319 housing units at an average density of 5.71 per square mile (2.20/km^{2}). The racial makeup of the township was 94.55% White, 0.00% African American, 0.00% Native American, 0.57% Asian, 0.00% Pacific Islander, 0.43% from other races, and 4.45% from two or more races. Hispanic or Latino of any race were 1.00% of the population.

There were 322 households, out of which 45.70% had children under the age of 18 living with them, 65.53% were married couples living together, 6.21% had a female householder with no spouse present, and 27.02% were non-families. 25.80% of all households were made up of individuals, and 9.90% had someone living alone who was 65 years of age or older. The average household size was 2.57 and the average family size was 3.11.

The township's age distribution consisted of 27.4% under the age of 18, 2.8% from 18 to 24, 25.7% from 25 to 44, 29.5% from 45 to 64, and 14.6% who were 65 years of age or older. The median age was 44.4 years. For every 100 females, there were 69.2 males. For every 100 females age 18 and over, there were 109.8 males.

The median income for a household in the township was $92,500, and the median income for a family was $137,054. Males had a median income of $125,126 versus $18,677 for females. The per capita income for the township was $38,793. About 2.6% of families and 2.7% of the population were below the poverty line, including 3.5% of those under age 18 and 1.7% of those age 65 or over.

== School districts ==
- Cumberland Community Unit School District 77
- Jasper County Community Unit School District 1

== Political districts ==
- Illinois' 19th congressional district
- State House District 108
- State Senate District 54
