= Hidalgo, Illinois =

- Village
- Location of Hidalgo in Jasper County, Illinois
- Coordinates: 39°09′21″N 88°08′57″W
- Country: United States
- State: Illinois
- County: Jasper
- Township: Crooked Creek

Area
  - Total: 0.34 sq mi (0.89 km^{2})
  - Land: 0.34 sq mi (0.89 km^{2})
  - Water: 0 sq mi (0.00 km^{2})
- Elevation: 581 ft (177 m)

Population (2020)
  - Total: 111
  - Density: 323.1/sq mi (124.75/km^{2})
- Time zone: UTC-6 (CST)
  - Summer (DST): UTC-5 (CDT)
- ZIP code: 62432
- Area code: 618
- FIPS code: 17–34553
- GNIS feature ID: 2398501

Hidalgo is a village in Jasper County, Illinois, United States. The population was 111 at the 2020 census.

== Geography ==
Hidalgo is located in northern Jasper County. Illinois Route 130 passes through the east side of the village, leading north 7 miles (11 km) to Greenup and south 12 miles (19 km) to Newton, the Jasper county seat.

According to the 2021 census gazetteer files, Hidalgo has a total area of 0.34 square miles (0.88 km^{2}), all land.

== Demographics ==
Historical population
Census	Pop.	Note	%±
1910	190		—
1920	193		1.6%
1930	153		−20.7%
1940	191		24.8%
1950	167		−12.6%
1960	126		−24.6%
1970	171		35.7%
1980	161		−5.8%
1990	122		−24.2%
2000	123		0.8%
2010	106		−13.8%
2020	111		4.7%
U.S. Decennial Census

As of the 2020 census there were 111 people, 46 households, and 26 families residing in the village. The population density was 322.67 inhabitants per square mile (124.58/km^{2}). There were 53 housing units at an average density of 154.07 per square mile (59.49/km^{2}). The racial makeup of the village was 97.30% White, 0.00% African American, 0.00% Native American, 0.90% Asian, 0.00% Pacific Islander, 0.00% from other races, and 1.80% from two or more races. Hispanic or Latino of any race were 1.80% of the population.

There were 46 households, out of which 34.8% had children under the age of 18 living with them, 50.00% were married couples living together, 6.52% had a female householder with no husband present, and 43.48% were non-families. 36.96% of all households were made up of individuals, and 23.91% had someone living alone who was 65 years of age or older. The average household size was 2.85 and the average family size was 2.17.

The village's age distribution consisted of 19.0% under the age of 18, 2.0% from 18 to 24, 19% from 25 to 44, 42% from 45 to 64, and 18.0% who were 65 years of age or older. The median age was 49.4 years. For every 100 females, there were 88.7 males. For every 100 females age 18 and over, there were 97.6 males.

The median income for a household in the village was $33,929, and the median income for a family was $40,000. Males had a median income of $26,458 versus $23,438 for females. The per capita income for the village was $18,622. About 11.5% of families and 12.1% of the population were below the poverty line, including 33.3% of those under age 18 and 0.0% of those age 65 or over.
