= Hunt City, Illinois =

- Unincorporated community
- Location within Illinois Location within the United States
- Coordinates: 39°03′04″N 88°01′24″W
- Country: United States
- State: Illinois
- County: Jasper
- Township: Hunt City
- Elevation: 525 ft (160 m)

Population (2010)
  - Total: 34
- ZIP code: 62480
- GNIS feature ID: 0410690

Hunt City is an unincorporated community in Hunt City Township, Jasper County, Illinois, United States.

== Geography ==
Hunt City is located at 39°03′04″N 88°01′24″W at an elevation of 525 feet (160 m).

== Notable residents ==
Singer and actor Burl Ives was born in Hunt City and is buried in Hunt City's Mound Cemetery.
