= Orpheus Chamber Orchestra =

American chamber orchestra

- Chamber orchestra
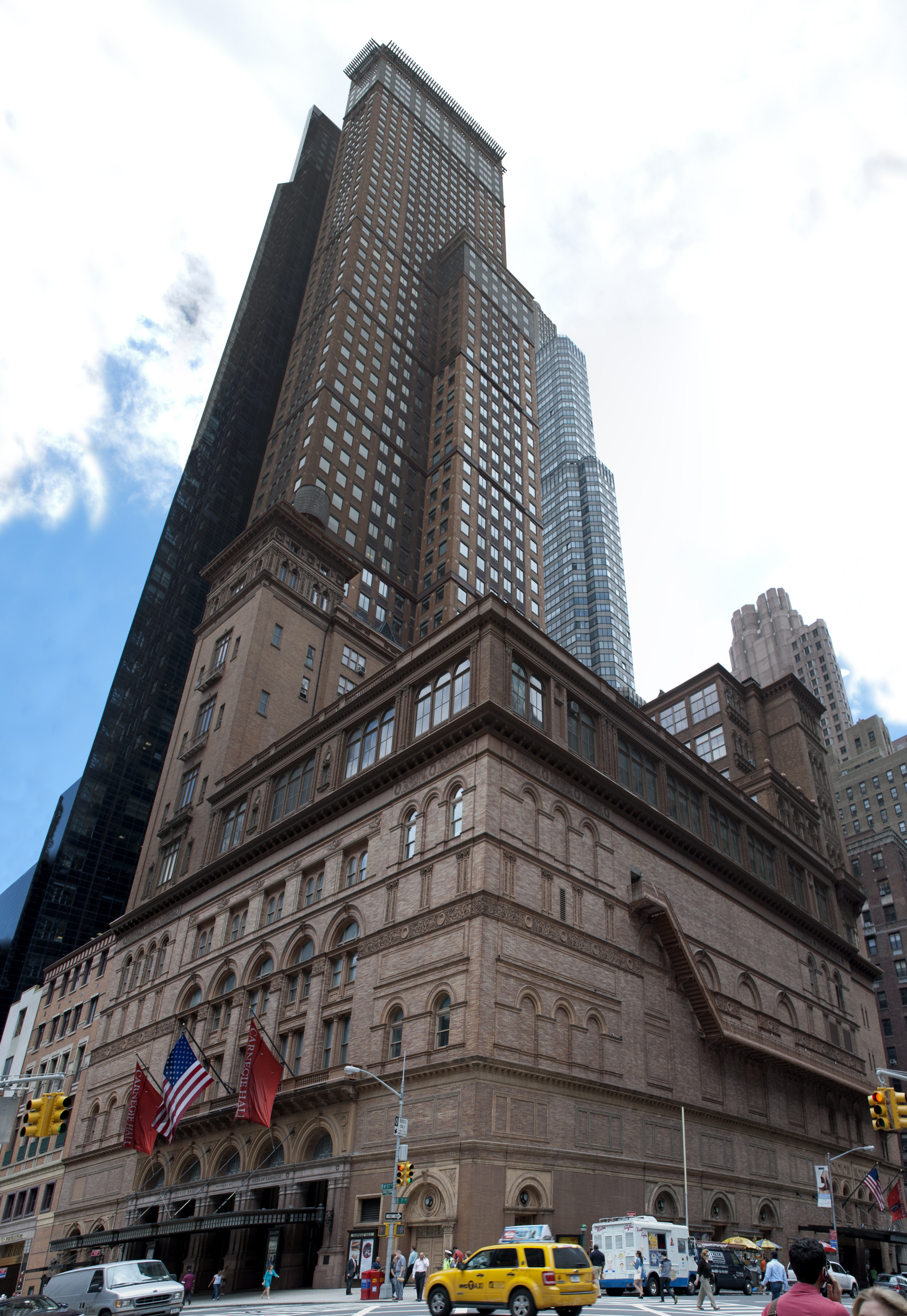
- Photograph of Carnegie Hall, New York City.
- Founded: 1972
- Location: New York City, US
- Principal conductor: None
- Website: www.orpheusnyc.org

The Orpheus Chamber Orchestra (founded in 1972) is a classical music chamber orchestra based in New York City. They have won several Grammy Awards, and are known for their collaborative leadership style in which the musicians, not a conductor, interpret the score.

== History ==
The Orpheus Chamber Orchestra was founded in 1972 by Julian Fifer and a group of young musicians. With 71 albums, including the Grammy Award-winning Shadow Dances: Stravinsky Miniatures, and 42 commissioned and premiered original works, Orpheus rotates musical leadership roles for each work.

Performing without a conductor, Orpheus presents an annual series at Carnegie Hall and tours extensively to major national and international venues.

Collaborators of Orpheus have included Fazıl Say, Isaac Stern, Gidon Kremer, Itzhak Perlman, Gil Shaham, Yo-Yo Ma, Mischa Maisky, Martina Arroyo, Emanuel Ax, Richard Goode, Alicia de Larrocha, Radu Lupu, Martha Argerich, Alfred Brendel, Horacio Gutiérrez, Murray Perahia, Peter Serkin, Joshua Bell, Mitsuko Uchida, Tatiana Troyanos, Martin Fröst, Anne Akiko Meyers, Maureen Forrester, Frederica von Stade, Peter Schreier, Anne Sofie von Otter, Nobuyuki Tsujii, Lucas and Arthur Jussen, Dawn Upshaw, and Renée Fleming. Orpheus has premiered works by Elliott Carter, Jacob Druckman, Mario Davidovsky, Michael Gandolfi, William Bolcom, Osvaldo Golijov, Fred Lerdahl, Gunther Schuller, Ellen Taaffe Zwilich, Susan Botti, David Rakowski, Bruce Adolphe, Peter Lieberson, Elizabeth Brown, Wayne Shorter, Brad Mehldau, and Shuying Li.

Individual members of Orpheus have received recognition for solo, chamber music, and orchestral performances. Of the 30 players who comprise the basic membership of Orpheus, many also hold teaching positions at conservatories and universities in the New York and New England areas, including Juilliard, Manhattan School of Music, New England Conservatory, Columbia, Yale, Mannes College of Music, Montclair State University, Stony Brook University, and the Hartt School. Orpheus musicians also hold posts with other orchestras such as the New York Philharmonic, American Composers Orchestra, Met Opera Orchestra, New Jersey Symphony, and New York City Ballet Orchestra. Orpheus members serve on the administrative staff as well as on the board of directors.

== Touring ==
Orpheus has embarked on many extensive tours of the United States, Europe, South America, and Asia, including Japan.

== Orpheus as a democratic workplace ==
In March 2007, Orpheus became one of the first winners of the Worldwide Award for the Most Democratic Workplaces sponsored by WorldBlu, Inc., a Washington, D.C.-based organization specializing in organizational democracy.

== Notable works ==
=== Recordings ===
The Orpheus has recorded over 70 albums. Their extensive catalog for Deutsche Grammophon includes Baroque masterworks of Handel, Corelli, and Vivaldi; Haydn symphonies; Mozart symphonies and serenades; the complete Mozart wind concerti with Orpheus members as soloists; Romantic works by Dvořák, Grieg, and Tchaikovsky; and a number of twentieth-century classics by Bartók, Prokofiev, Fauré, Ravel, Schoenberg, and others. Recent releases include Wayfaring Stranger, a recording of English and American folk songs with countertenor Andreas Scholl (Decca); Creation, a collection of Impressionist music from 1920s Paris with saxophonist Branford Marsalis (Sony Classical); a series of recordings of Mozart's greatest piano concerti with Richard Goode (Nonesuch); and a vigorous reading of Vivaldi's Four Seasons with Sarah Chang (EMI Classics). A collection of Mozart piano concerti with Jonathan Biss was released in 2008, also on EMI Classics, and in 2014 Orpheus released its first self-produced album containing Beethoven Symphonies Nos. 5 & 7 recorded live at Carnegie Hall.

=== Commissioning ===
Within the past decade, Orpheus presented The New Brandenburgs program, engaging six composers to create six new works for the orchestra. Each composer took as their point of departure one of Bach's Brandenburg Concertos and was asked to compose a new piece inspired by the original. Following the completion of The New Brandenburgs, Orpheus launched its Project 440 initiative that commissioned works from four emerging composers chosen by a diverse group of advisors through a nationwide selection process. The four composers were Cynthia Wong, Clint Needham, Andrew Norman, and Alex Mincek.
