= Oklahoma Cyclone =

1930 film

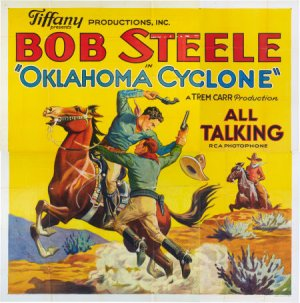
- Theatrical release poster
- Directed by: John P. McCarthy
- Written by: John P. McCarthy (story)
- Produced by: Trem Carr (producer)
- Starring: See below
- Cinematography: M.A. Anderson; Hap Depew
- Edited by: Fred Allen
- Distributed by: Tiffany Pictures
- Release date: August 8, 1930
- Running time: 66 minutes
- Country: United States
- Language: English

Oklahoma Cyclone is a 1930 American pre-Code Western film directed by John P. McCarthy that is a forerunner of the singing cowboy genre. It stars Bob Steele in his second talking picture playing the title role and singing. The film was released by Tiffany Pictures. The film was remade as Song of the Gringo.

== Plot ==
A cowboy pretends to be an outlaw in order to become a member of the gang that killed his sheriff father.

== Cast ==
- Bob Steele as Jimmy Henderson / Jim Smith
- Rita Rey as Carmelita Carlos
- Al St. John as Slim
- Charles King as McKim / Black Diablo
- Slim Whitaker as Henchman Rawhide
- Cliff Lyons as Henchman
- N.E. Hendrix as Henchman Shorty
- Hector Sarno as Don Pablo Carlos
- Emilio Fernández as Pancho Gomez

== Production ==
John P. McCarthy was the director of Oklahoma Cyclone, and he and Ford Beebe were the film's writers. Trem Carr was the producer for Trem Carr Productions.

Al St. John sang "The Lavender Cowboy" (Music by Ewen Hail, lyrics by Harold Hersey) in the film.
