= Burl Ives and the Korean Orphan Choir Sing of Faith and Joy =

Studio album by Burl Ives
- Released: 1963
- Genre: Gospel
- Length: 31:30
- Label: Word
- Producer: Kurt Kaiser

Burl Ives and the Korean Orphan Choir Sing of Faith and Joy is an album by the American folk singer Burl Ives. Released on the Herald label in 1963, this is a collection of gospel hymns, most having verses and a chorus. The album also features the World Vision Korean Orphan Choir.

Each hymn is arranged in a similar way, with Ives and the choir sharing the vocals, and accompaniment provided by a piano and organ arrangement. Musicians are uncredited on the album cover. On many of the hymns the Korean choir sing sections in their native language.

Ives, widely known as a singer of folk music, joins with the world-famous Korean Orphan Choir to sing these songs of "Faith and Joy". As he sang he was recalling nostalgic memories of the little wooden church in Southern Illinois where he sang many of these same hymns as a youth ... and later still when he was a lay evangelist, bringing the message of the love of God, through song and words, to audiences in many parts of the United States. Of the making of the recordings here presented he had this to say: "It was a beautiful experience singing with these children. In all of my life nothing has humbled and inspired me as this. The glow of their faces, and the warmth of their smiles brought the breadth of God's love into our presence as we sang these great hymns. It all fitted together – as though it were meant to be. The simple message of the Gospel so clearly stated in words and music – and so captivatingly shown in the lives of these little Korean orphans – made a terrific impact deep within my heart." Everywhere the Korean Orphan Choir go they bring living testimony of the work of World Vision throughout the world. They are indeed symbolic of the 18,000 orphans cared for by this organisation in 16 nations. (From: Notes on LP cover)

Choir Director: Dr Soo Chul Chang; professor of music, Union Christian College, Seoul

== Track listing ==
1. "Revive Us Again"
2. "O Happy Day"
3. "There Is a Fountain"
4. "When the Roll Is Called Up Yonder"
5. "Dwelling in Beulah Land"
6. "I Love to Tell the Story"
7. "Jesus Loves Even Me"
8. "At the Cross"
9. "Precious Jewels"
10. "I Need Thee Every Hour"
11. "The Way of the Cross Leads Home"
12. "Abide with Me"
13. "Tell it to Jesus"
14. "He Hideth My Soul"
