= The Riddle Song =

English folk song

"The Riddle Song" (Roud 330), also known as "I Gave My Love a Cherry", is an English-language folk song, a lullaby most likely originating in England and carried over by settlers to the American Appalachians. As is typical with such songs, it is based on the pentatonic scale.

== History ==
Riddle Song
One version of the Riddle Song.

"The Riddle Song" descends from a 15th-century English song in which a maiden says she is advised to unite with her lover. It is related to Child Ballad no. 1, or "Riddles Wisely Expounded" and Child Ballad no. 46, "Captain Wedderburn's Courtship" It is no. 330 in the Roud Folk Song Index. Burl Ives recorded it on 11 February 1941 for his first album, Okeh Presents the Wayfaring Stranger. Since then, it has been recorded by many artists, including Josh White in 1949.

The song's "cherry that has no stone" goes back to the 15th-century version's "the cherye with-outyn ony ston." Some have seen it as a reference to the hymen, and some have even tried to reconstruct an original bawdy version from which modern versions are supposedly bowdlerized. However, the relevant slang sense of "cherry" is not attested till the early 20th century. The other riddles in the original do not resemble the "reconstructions."

== Popular culture ==
The song was sung by the African-American blues and folk musician Josh White in the 1949 John Sturges film "The Walking Hills."

It was sung by Ann-Margret in the 1961 Frank Capra film Pocketful of Miracles.

The song was sung by Stephen Bishop in the toga party scene in the movie National Lampoon's Animal House (1978). It was used because of its public domain status and the film's budget was too small to pay for licensing another period-correct song.

The song appeared in the "Marge vs. the Monorail" episode of The Simpsons, where Homer briefly serenaded Marge with a line: "I gave my love a chicken, it had no bones. Mmm... chicken."
