= Peter Gray (song) =

American ballad

"Peter Gray" is an American ballad about a young man whose fiancee is sent out west (Ohio) after her father discovers their plan to wed. The man goes west and is scalped by Indians. The song appears to date back to at least 1858. It was recorded by Burl Ives on March 3, 1941 for his debut album Okeh Presents the Wayfaring Stranger. It has also been recorded by Ed McCurdy and Mike Seeger, and by Tapio Rautavaara in Finnish (1952).
