= Henry Martin (song) =

Traditional Scottish folk song

"Henry Martin" (also "Henry Martyn" or "The Lofty Tall Ship") (Roud 104, Child 167/250) is a traditional Scottish folk song about Henry Martin (formerly "Andrew Barton"), a seafarer who turns to piracy to support his two older brothers. Writing in 1975, the musician and folklorist A. L. Lloyd described Henry Martin as "one of the most-sung ballads of our time."

The story of Andrew Bartin, based on the original ballad, was included in Francis James Child's collection of The English and Scottish Popular Ballads (Child's Ballads), as Child Ballad 167. However, over the years, through oral tradition, the song had been significantly shortened and the name of the protagonist changed from Andrew Barton to Henry Martin (or Henry Martyn). In this form, the tale also appears in Child's Ballads as Child Ballad 250.

Many popular modern recordings were inspired by Joan Baez's 1960 cover of the traditional Welsh singer Phil Tanner's 1937 recording.

== History ==
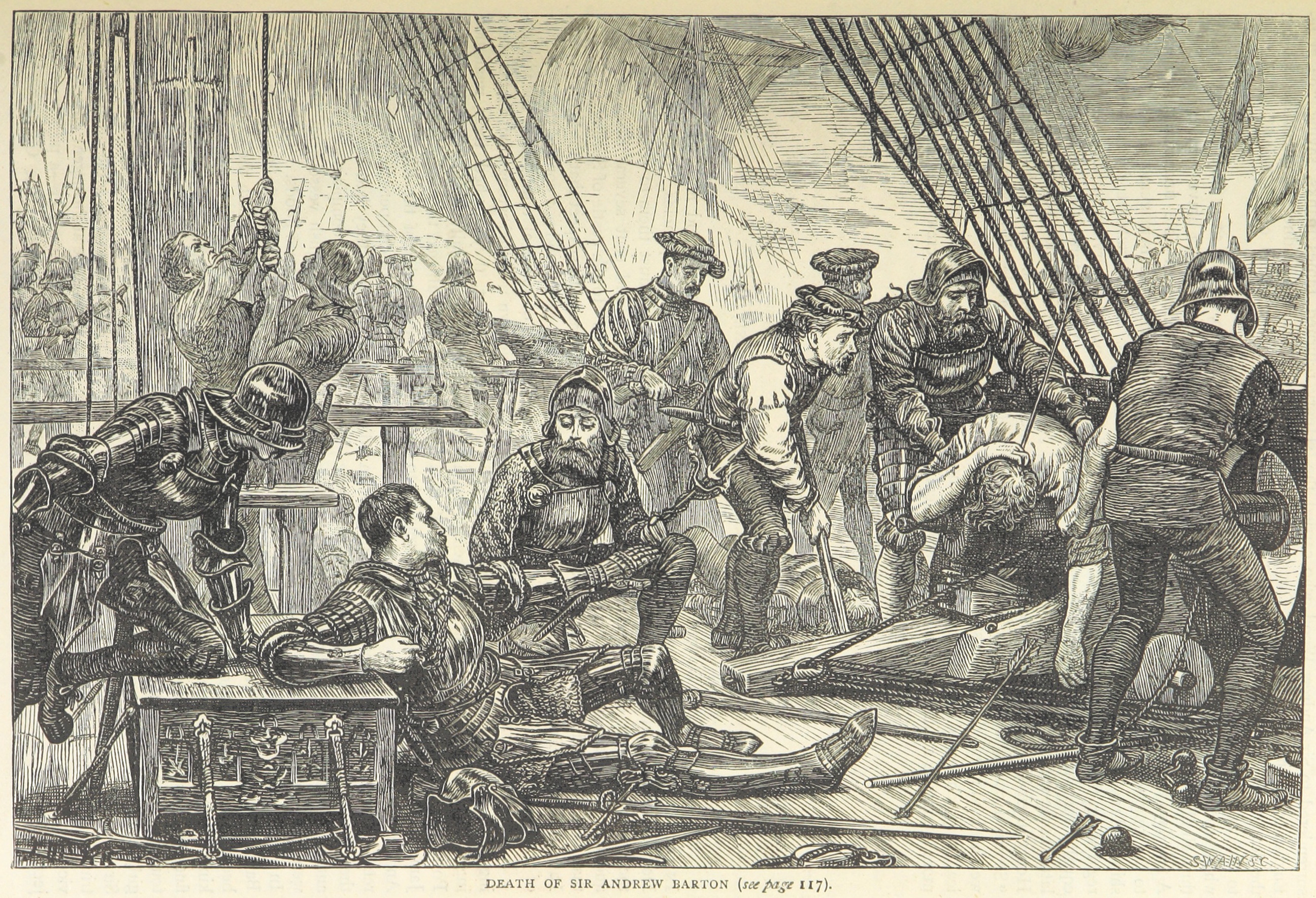
The death of Andrew Barton, illustrated in James Grant's British Battles on Land and Sea, 1873

The first known printed version dates from the early 17th century and consisted of 82 verses describing the exploits of Sir Andrew Barton and his two brothers, Robert and John. Barton was a privateer who carried a letter of marque issued by James IV, king of Scotland, giving him the right to arrest and seize Portuguese ships. He is alleged, however, to have exceeded his licence, engaging more generally in piracy. On 2 August 1511, he was killed, and his ship The Lion captured, after a fierce battle with Sir Edward Howard and his brother Thomas Howard, 3rd Duke of Norfolk, who were acting on the authority of the English king Henry VIII.

== Notable recordings ==
=== Traditional recordings ===
- Phil Tanner (1937)
- Sam Larner recorded by Ewan McColl and Peggy Seeger (1958–60) on Now is the Time for Fishing (1961)

=== Popular folk revival versions ===
- Burl Ives on Wayfaring Stranger (1944)
- A.L. Lloyd on The English and Scottish Popular Ballads, Volume IV (1956)
- Alfred Deller on Western Wind and Other English Folk Songs (1958)
- Joan Baez on Joan Baez (1960)
- A.L. Lloyd and Alf Edwards on English and Scottish Popular Ballads (Topic 1964, 1996)
- Bert Jansch on Jack Orion (1966)
- Donovan on HMS Donovan (1971)
- Figgy Duff on Weather Out the Storm (1989)
- Andreas Scholl on Wayfaring Stranger: Folksongs (2001)
- Sherwood on The Favourite Songs of Henry VIII (2008)
- Alestorm on Curse of the Crystal Coconut (2020)

Many of the popular recordings, including those of Joan Baez and Alestorm, are covers of Phil Tanner's recording.

== See also ==
- List of the Child Ballads
