= Ye Vagabonds =

Irish folk music duo

Ye Vagabonds is an Irish folk music duo consisting of Carlow-based brothers Diarmuid and Brían Mac Gloinn. Having been described as "being at the fore of a new wave of Irish folk", they won three awards at the 2019 RTÉ Radio 1 Folk Awards: Best Track (for a recording of "Foggy Dew"), Best Album (their 2019 album The Hare's Lament), and Best Folk Group. Ye Vagabonds are signed to River Lea, which is described as an offshoot of Rough Trade Records. They are currently working on a fourth album.

== Artistry ==
=== Musical style and themes ===
Diarmuid has described the duo's style as being "connected with the Ulster singing tradition with harmonies that draw on American traditional music". Having grown up speaking Irish at home, they have released several songs in the language.

== Discography ==
=== Albums ===
- Ye Vagabonds (2017)
- The Hare’s Lament (2019)
- Nine Waves (2022)
- All Tied Together (2026)

=== EPs ===
- Rose & Briar (2015)

=== Singles ===
- "I'm a Rover" / "The Bothy Lads" (2021)
- "The Parting Glass" with Boygenius (2023)

== Awards ==
Year	Awarding Body	Category	Nominated work	Result
2018	RTÉ Radio 1 Folk Awards	Best Traditional Folk Track	Lowlands of Holland	Nominated
2018	RTÉ Radio 1 Folk Awards	Best Emerging Folk Artist		Nominated
2018	RTÉ Radio 1 Folk Awards	Best Folk Group		Nominated
2019	RTÉ Radio 1 Folk Awards	Best Traditional Folk Track	The Foggy Dew	Won
2019	RTÉ Radio 1 Folk Awards	Best Traditional Folk Track	Balach Shíol Andaí	Nominated
2019	RTÉ Radio 1 Folk Awards	Best Folk Group		Won
2019	RTÉ Radio 1 Folk Awards	Best Folk Album	The Hare's Lament	Won
2019	BBC Radio 2 Folk Awards	Best Traditional Track	The Foggy Dew	Won
2021	RTÉ Radio 1 Folk Awards	Best Traditional Folk Track	I'm a Rover	Won
2021	RTÉ Radio 1 Folk Awards	Best Folk Group		Won
2022	RTÉ Radio 1 Folk Awards	Best Folk Album	Nine Waves	Won
