= Grandville Township, Jasper County, Illinois =

Grandville Township
- Township
- Location in Jasper County

- Jasper County's location in Illinois
- Coordinates: 39°07′35″N 88°00′06″W
- Country: United States
- State: Illinois
- County: Jasper
- Established: November 8, 1859

Area
  - Total: 36.99 sq mi (95.8 km^{2})
  - Land: 36.99 sq mi (95.8 km^{2})
  - Water: 0 sq mi (0 km^{2}) 0.01%
- Elevation: 541 ft (165 m)

Population (2020)
  - Total: 357
  - Density: 9.65/sq mi (3.73/km^{2})
- Time zone: UTC-6 (CST)
  - Summer (DST): UTC-5 (CDT)
- ZIP codes: 62420, 62480, 62481
- FIPS code: 17-079-30887

Grandville Township is one of eleven townships in Jasper County, Illinois, USA. As of the 2020 census, its population was 357 and it contained 154 housing units.

== Geography ==
According to the 2021 census gazetteer files, Grandville Township has a total area of 36.99 square miles (95.80 km^{2}), of which 36.99 square miles (95.80 km^{2}) (or 99.99%) is land and 0.00 square miles (0.00 km^{2}) (or 0.01%) is water.

=== Cities, towns, villages ===
- Yale

=== Unincorporated towns ===
- Advance at 39.156706°N 88.028924°W

(This list is based on USGS data and may include former settlements.)

=== Adjacent townships ===
- Johnson Township, Clark County (northeast)
- Licking Township, Crawford County (east)
- Hunt City Township (south)
- Crooked Creek Township (west)
- Crooked Creek Township, Cumberland County (northwest)

=== Cemeteries ===
The township contains these seven cemeteries: Backbone, Bethel, Chapman, Debord, Leamon/Walnut, McFadden and Yale.

=== Major highways ===
- Illinois Route 49

== Demographics ==
As of the 2020 census there were 357 people, 188 households, and 165 families residing in the township. The population density was 9.65 inhabitants per square mile (3.73/km^{2}). There were 154 housing units at an average density of 4.16 per square mile (1.61/km^{2}). The racial makeup of the township was 94.68% White, 0.00% African American, 1.68% Native American, 0.00% Asian, 0.00% Pacific Islander, 0.00% from other races, and 3.64% from two or more races. Hispanic or Latino of any race were 0.00% of the population.

There were 188 households, out of which 37.20% had children under the age of 18 living with them, 86.17% were married couples living together, 1.60% had a female householder with no spouse present, and 12.23% were non-families. 11.20% of all households were made up of individuals, and 4.30% had someone living alone who was 65 years of age or older. The average household size was 2.30 and the average family size was 2.44.

The township's age distribution consisted of 19.7% under the age of 18, 3.2% from 18 to 24, 16.6% from 25 to 44, 28.5% from 45 to 64, and 31.9% who were 65 years of age or older. The median age was 52.1 years. For every 100 females, there were 91.2 males. For every 100 females age 18 and over, there were 110.3 males.

The median income for a household in the township was $39,894, and the median income for a family was $41,319. Males had a median income of $44,356 versus $23,750 for females. The per capita income for the township was $21,775. About 8.5% of families and 13.3% of the population were below the poverty line, including 16.3% of those under age 18 and 4.3% of those age 65 or over.

Historical population
Census	Pop.	Note	%±
2000	333		—
2010	372		11.7%
2020	357		−4.0%
U.S. Decennial Census

== School districts ==
- Casey-Westfield Community Unit School District 4c
- Jasper County Community Unit School District 1

== Political districts ==
- Illinois' 19th congressional district
- State House District 108
- State Senate District 54
