= John A. Stone =

American folklorist

John A. Stone (died 1864), also known as "Old Put", was an American collector and publisher of folk songs, primarily about miners and their adventures in the California Gold Rush of the mid-19th century.

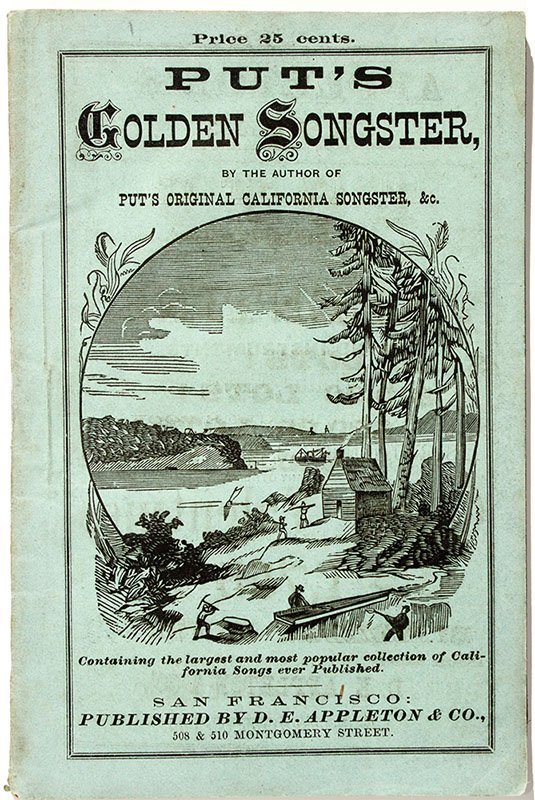
Put's Golden Songster, 1858

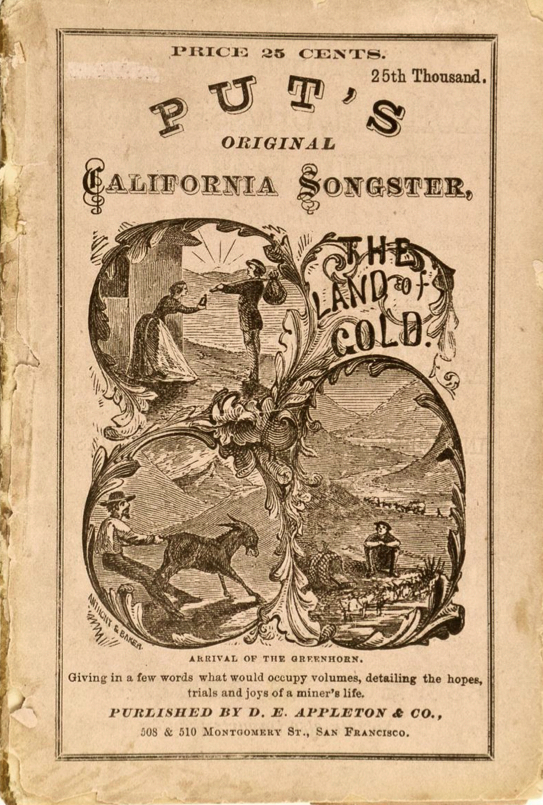
Put's Original California Songster, 1855

He was a colorful writer-entertainer who had made the overland trip to California in 1850 and spent some fruitless years prospecting for gold. Assuming the name "Old Put", he became San Francisco's foremost minstrel composer and the singing voice of the California Gold Rush. From 1853 to 1858, he wrote more than fifty different songs about miners and their life. He published about half of them in a collection called Put's Original California Songster. The little book sold phenomenally well, and was reprinted several times. In 1858 Stone published Put's Golden Songster, containing his most famous composition "Sweet Betsy from Pike".

John A. Stone died in 1864 and is buried in Greenwood, California.
