= Hunt City Township, Jasper County, Illinois =

Hunt City Township
- Township
- Location in Jasper County

- Jasper County's location in Illinois
- Coordinates: 39°02′56″N 88°01′14″W
- Country: United States
- State: Illinois
- County: Jasper
- Established: September 11, 1901

Area
  - Total: 32.03 sq mi (83.0 km^{2})
  - Land: 32.03 sq mi (83.0 km^{2})
  - Water: 0 sq mi (0 km^{2}) 0%
- Elevation: 518 ft (158 m)

Population (2020)
  - Total: 248
  - Density: 7.74/sq mi (2.99/km^{2})
- Time zone: UTC-6 (CST)
  - Summer (DST): UTC-5 (CDT)
- ZIP codes: 62448, 62480, 62481
- FIPS code: 17-079-36659

Hunt City Township is one of eleven townships in Jasper County, Illinois, USA. As of the 2020 census, its population was 248 and it contained 120 housing units.

== Geography ==
According to the 2021 census gazetteer files, Hunt City Township has a total area of 32.03 square miles (82.96 km^{2}), all land.

=== Unincorporated towns ===
- Brookville at 39.039486°N 88.066147°W
- Hunt City at 39.051153°N 88.023368°W

(This list is based on USGS data and may include former settlements.)

=== Adjacent townships ===
- Grandville Township (north)
- Licking Township, Crawford County (northeast)
- Oblong Township, Crawford County (east)
- Willow Hill Township (south)
- Wade Township (west)
- Crooked Creek Township (northwest)

=== Cemeteries ===
The township contains these five cemeteries: Baily, Brockville, Mattison/Madison, Mound and Sand Rock.

=== Major highways ===
- Illinois Route 49

== Demographics ==
As of the 2020 census there were 248 people, 74 households, and 46 families residing in the township. The population density was 7.74 inhabitants per square mile (2.99/km^{2}). There were 120 housing units at an average density of 3.75 per square mile (1.45/km^{2}). The racial makeup of the township was 94.35% White, 0.00% African American, 0.40% Native American, 0.40% Asian, 0.00% Pacific Islander, 2.02% from other races, and 2.82% from two or more races. Hispanic or Latino of any race were 2.02% of the population.

There were 74 households, out of which 17.60% had children under the age of 18 living with them, 52.70% were married couples living together, 9.46% had a female householder with no spouse present, and 37.84% were non-families. 37.80% of all households were made up of individuals, and 37.80% had someone living alone who was 65 years of age or older. The average household size was 2.03 and the average family size was 2.65.

The township's age distribution consisted of 6.0% under the age of 18, 12.7% from 18 to 24, 0% from 25 to 44, 38.7% from 45 to 64, and 42.7% who were 65 years of age or older. The median age was 53.4 years. For every 100 females, there were 130.8 males. For every 100 females age 18 and over, there were 116.9 males.

The median income for a household in the township was $54,792, and the median income for a family was $54,375. Males had a median income of $50,250 versus $-666,666,666 for females. The per capita income for the township was $31,327. About 0.0% of families and 6.0% of the population were below the poverty line, including 0.0% of those under age 18 and 14.1% of those age 65 or over.

Historical population
Census	Pop.	Note	%±
2000	279		—
2010	282		1.1%
2020	248		−12.1%
U.S. Decennial Census

== School districts ==
- Jasper County Community Unit School District 1
- Oblong Community Unit School District 4

== Political districts ==
- Illinois's 19th congressional district
- State House District 108
- State Senate District 54

== Notable residents ==
- Burl Ives was born in Hunt City Township, and is buried there at Mound Cemetery.
