= The Longines Symphonette =

Classical music radio program

- Genre: Classical music
- Country of origin: United States
- Language: English
- Syndicates: NBC, Mutual, CBS
- Announcer: Frank Knight
- Directed by: Macklin Marrow, Mishel Piastr (conductors)
- Original release: 1941–1958
- Opening theme: Beethoven's Fifth Symphony
- Sponsored by: Longines

The Longines Symphonette was an American radio program that aired from 1941 through 1958 broadcasting classical music. A related brand, the Longines Symphonette Society, was a record label active from the early 1960s into the 1970s. Symphonette refers to "a symphony orchestra that plays light music in addition to the standard classical repertoire."

== History ==
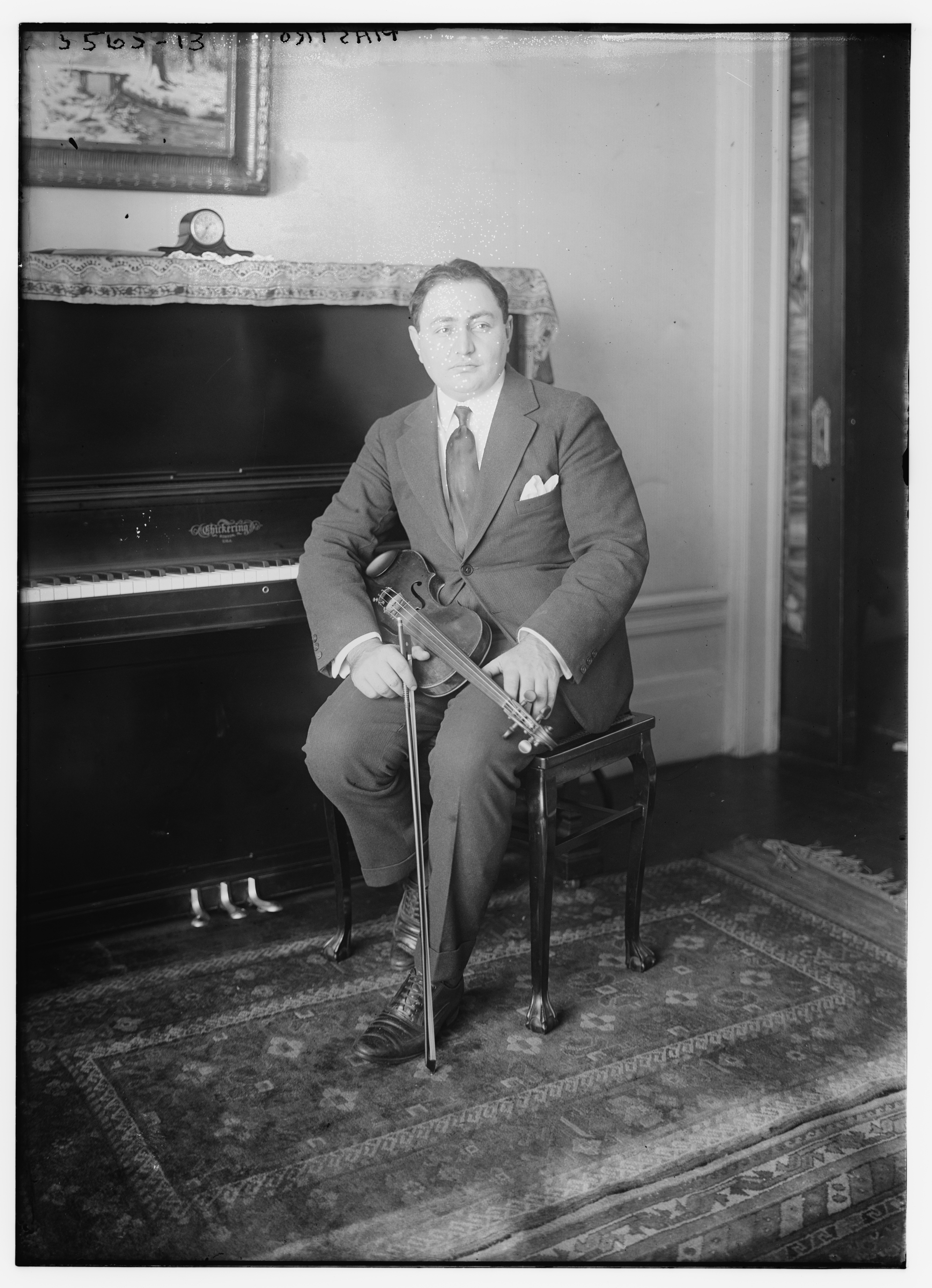
Mishel Piastro, conductor

Sponsored by the Longines watch company, mentions of the program can be found in newspaper listings as early as April 1941, broadcast on stations of the NBC Radio Network. By June 1941, Longines was selling records under The Longines Symphonette branding via newspaper advertisement.

The Longines Symphonette program was pre-recorded and broadcast nightly on many Mutual Broadcasting System radio stations from 1943 to 1949. The program later moved to CBS Radio, where it was heard on Sundays at 2 pm from 1949 through December 1958.

The program's introductory theme was the final movement of Beethoven's Fifth Symphony. The program's initial conductor was Macklin Marrow (1900–1953), followed for most of the run by Mishel Piastro (1891–1970), one-time concertmaster of the New York Philharmonic. Frank Knight (1894–1973) was the program's announcer.

A spin-off program, The Wittnauer Choraliers, aired on CBS from 1949 through 1954. The Wittnauer brand was owned by Longines during this era.

== Longines Symphonette Society ==
Longines Symphonette Society was a record label that specialized in releasing classic radio programs and multiple-record boxed sets. It was active by 1964, when it was originally known as the Longines Symphonette Recording Society.

Boxed sets released by the label include Bing Crosby's Treasury – The Songs I Love (1966, 6 albums) and Burl Ives Presents America's Musical Heritage (1963, 6 albums). Evolution Records, a popular-music subsidiary, had a US hit single with "One Fine Morning" by Lighthouse in 1971.

The Longines watch company sold its record business to Warner Music Group. Re-issues of the Longines recordings since the 1990s have been credited to the "Symphonette Society" and no longer have any reference to the watch company.

== Other uses of the name ==
In November 1965, The Symphonette Shop, a retail store featuring "the best selling Longines Symphonette recordings", was opened in Larchmont, New York.

Longines Symphonette was used as the trade name of some electronic devices, including transistor radios, televisions, and electronic calculators produced by Texas Instruments.

During the 1970s, a number of commemorative coins were produced by the Wittnauer Mint and marketed under the Longines Symphonette brand.

Longines Symphonette was referenced in the lyrics of "Birdhouse in Your Soul", a 1989 single by the American alternative rock band They Might Be Giants. The reference was reportedly about the record label rather than the radio program.

As of 2026, Longines Symphonette is the name of a contemporary family of ladies' watches offered by Longines.
