= The Wayfaring Stranger (album) =

Studio album by Burl Ives
- Released: 1944
- Genre: Folk
- Label: Asch

The Wayfaring Stranger (Asch 345) is an album consisting of three 10-inch, 78 rpm records by Burl Ives released on Asch in 1944. It should not be confused with Ives' 1944 album for Columbia Records (C-103) – also called The Wayfaring Stranger- and a re-release of a 1941 album on Okeh Records - containing different songs. The Asch album includes the first releases of two signature songs by Ives: "Poor Wayfaring Stranger" and "The Blue Tail Fly."

The same collection of songs was reissued in 1947 on the Stinson label as a 78-rpm album (Stinson 345), then a 10-inch LP (Stinson SLP-1) in 1949, a 12-inch LP c. 1954 (also with catalog number Stinson SLP-1), retitled Blue Tail Fly and Other Favorites, and finally a cassette tape (Stinson CA-1). All of the Stinson releases with the exception of the 78-rpm album had two bonus tracks: "The Fox" and "Brennan on the Moor."

In 1948 Burl Ives also released an autobiography with the same title.

== Track listing ==
Track listing for record 1 (Asch or Stinson 345–1)
Track	Song Title
A1.	Poor Wayfaring Stranger
A2.	Buckeye Jim
B1.	The Bold Soldier
B2.	The Sow Took the Measles

Track listing for record 2 (Asch or Stinson 345–2)
Track	Song Title
C.	The Foggy Foggy Dew
D.	Black Is the Color

Track listing for record 3 (Asch or Stinson 345–3)
Track	Song Title
E.	Henry Martin
F.	The Blue Tail Fly

== Track listing ==
Stinson SLP-1A (1963) on clear red vinyl (A Re-Pressing from the 1970s)

Stinson SLP-1 track listing Side One (Stinson SLP-1A)
Track	Song Title
1.	Poor Wayfaring Stranger
2.	Black Is The Color
3.	The Foggy Foggy Dew
4.	Buckeye Jim
5.	The Bold Soldier

Stinson SLP-2 track listing Side Two (Stinson SLP-2A)
Track	Song Title
1.	The Sow Took the Measles
2.	The Blue Tail Fly
3.	Henry Martin
4.	The Fox (Bonus Track)
5.	Brennan on the Moor (Bonus Track)
