= Rose Hill, Illinois =

- Village
- Location of Rose Hill in Jasper County, Illinois
- Coordinates: 39°06′15″N 88°09′00″W
- Country: United States
- State: Illinois
- County: Jasper
- Township: Crooked Creek

Area
  - Total: 0.63 sq mi (1.64 km^{2})
  - Land: 0.63 sq mi (1.64 km^{2})
  - Water: 0 sq mi (0.00 km^{2})
- Elevation: 564 ft (172 m)

Population (2020)
  - Total: 89
  - Density: 140/sq mi (54.2/km^{2})
- Time zone: UTC-6 (CST)
  - Summer (DST): UTC-5 (CDT)
- ZIP code: 62432
- Area code: 618
- FIPS code: 17–65754
- GNIS feature ID: 2399119

Rose Hill is a village in Jasper County, Illinois, United States. The population was 89 at the 2020 census.

== History ==
A post office was established at Rose Hill in 1846, and remained in operation until 1967. The village's name is an alteration of "Roe's Hill".

In 1845 a large wave of Luxembourgers settled in Rosehill.

== Geography ==
Rose Hill is located in northern Jasper County. Illinois Route 130 forms the eastern boundary of the village; it leads north 11 miles (18 km) to Greenup and south 9 miles (14 km) to Newton, the Jasper county seat.

According to the 2021 census gazetteer files, Rose Hill has a total area of 0.63 square miles (1.63 km^{2}), all land.

== Demographics ==
Historical population
Census	Pop.	Note	%±
1910	229		—
1920	202		−11.8%
1930	179		−11.4%
1940	157		−12.3%
1950	128		−18.5%
1960	117		−8.6%
1970	103		−12.0%
1980	121		17.5%
1990	78		−35.5%
2000	79		1.3%
2010	80		1.3%
2020	89		11.3%
U.S. Decennial Census

As of the 2020 census there were 89 people, 39 households, and 20 families residing in the village. The population density was 140.38 inhabitants per square mile (54.20/km^{2}). There were 43 housing units at an average density of 67.82 per square mile (26.19/km^{2}). The racial makeup of the village was 87.64% White, 0.00% African American, 0.00% Native American, 1.12% Asian, 0.00% Pacific Islander, 1.12% from other races, and 10.11% from two or more races. Hispanic or Latino of any race were 3.37% of the population.

There were 39 households, out of which 28.2% had children under the age of 18 living with them, 20.51% were married couples living together, 20.51% had a female householder with no husband present, and 48.72% were non-families. 46.15% of all households were made up of individuals, and 10.26% had someone living alone who was 65 years of age or older. The average household size was 2.90 and the average family size was 2.13.

The village's age distribution consisted of 25.3% under the age of 18, 6.0% from 18 to 24, 28.8% from 25 to 44, 28.9% from 45 to 64, and 10.8% who were 65 years of age or older. The median age was 39.5 years. For every 100 females, there were 151.5 males. For every 100 females age 18 and over, there were 113.8 males.

The median income for a household in the village was $35,417, and the median income for a family was $71,250. Males had a median income of $26,667 versus $31,250 for females. The per capita income for the village was $24,252. About 15.0% of families and 12.0% of the population were below the poverty line, including 9.5% of those under age 18 and 22.2% of those age 65 or over.
