= Burl Ives' Animal Folk =

Studio album by Burl Ives
- Released: 1963
- Genre: Folk
- Label: Disneyland Records

Burl Ives' Animal Folk (Disneyland ST 3920, 1963) is one of several albums for children by the folk singer Burl Ives.

There is a full-color booklet inserted between the gatefold covers of this album. The booklet is lavishly illustrated with selected song lyrics and cartoon representations of Ives interacting with the animals in the songs. The illustrator is not identified, but was likely a Disney staff artist.

Although intended for children, the album is notable for its many references to the death, loss of or danger to the characters in the songs (see below for a breakdown).

Ten of the songs from Animal Folk were released as A Day at the Zoo with Burl Ives (Disneyland 1347) in 1972.

Wayfarer Music, the copyright holder of many of the songs in 1963, was a company started by Ives. It is now administered by his widow.

== Track listing ==
=== Side 1 ===
Track	Song Title	Writer/Composer	Publisher in 1963
1.	The Whale	Traditional	Southern Music
2.	Jim Johnson's Mule	Traditional	Wayfarer Music
3.	The Owl and the Pussycat	Edward Lear	Wayfarer Music
4.	The Black and White Pigeon	Billy Hayes, Milton Leeds, Jack Smiles	Walt Disney Music
5.	The Robin and the Chicken	probably Grace F. Coolidge	Wayfarer Music
6.	Johnny Doolan's Cat	Rhodes & Conley	Wayfarer Music
7.	My Fine White Pony	Unknown	Wayfarer Music

=== Side 2 ===
Track	Song Title	Writer/Composer	Publisher in 1963
1.	Oriole	Wiliam L. Love Lock	Wayfarer Music
2.	Mr. Rabbit	Traditional	Southern
3.	Where's Joe	Unknown	Wayfarer Music
4.	The Wonderful Crocodile	Traditional, Burl Ives	Southern Music
5.	The Little Turtle	Vachel Lindsay, Albert Hague	Chappell and Company
6.	The Robin	Traditional, Burl Ives	Wayfarer Music
7.	The Horse of Demerara	Traditional	Unknown
