= It's Just My Funny Way of Laughin' =

Studio album by Burl Ives
- Released: January 1, 1962
- Recorded: 1961
- Length: 29:23
- Label: Decca

Singles from It's Just My Funny Way of Laughin'
- 1. "Funny Way of Laughin'" Released: March 1962; 2. "Call Me Mr. In-Between" Released: June 1962

Professional ratings
Review scores
| Source | Rating |
|---|---|
| New Record Mirror | 5/5 stars |

It's Just My Funny Way of Laughin' is a 1962 album by Burl Ives, recorded in Nashville, Tennessee. It rose to No. 24 on Billboard's 1962 Pop Albums Chart. During the same year, the title song, composed by Hank Cochran, reached No. 3 on Billboard's Contemporary Adult Singles Chart, No. 9 on the Country Singles Chart, and No. 10 on the Pop Singles Chart. The title song earned Ives a Grammy Award for Best Country & Western Recording. Another song, "Call Me Mr. In-Between," composed by Harlan Howard, peaked at No. 3 on the Country Singles Chart, No. 6 on the Adult Contemporary Singles Chart, and No. 19 on the Pop Singles Chart.

"What You Gonna Do, Leroy" was covered by Buddy Miller and Julie Miller for their 2009 album Written in Chalk

== Track listing ==
| No. | Title | Writer(s) | Length |
|---|---|---|---|
| 1. | "Funny Way of Laughin'" | Hank Cochran | 2:39 |
| 2. | "Sixteen Fathoms Down" | Mel Tillis | 2:12 |
| 3. | "Brooklyn Bridge" | Mel Tillis, Wayne Walker | 2:24 |
| 4. | "Ninety-Nine [Years]" | Bill Anderson | 2:12 |
| 5. | "Thumbin' Johnny Brown" | Jimmy Fox | 2:31 |
| 6. | "I Ain't Comin' Home Tonight" | Roger Miller | 2:25 |
| 7. | "What You Gonna Do, Leroy?" | Mel Tillis | 2:33 |
| 8. | "In Foggy Old London" | Al Robinson | 2:05 |
| 9. | "That's All I Can Remember" | Mel Tillis, Marijohn Wilkin | 2:57 |
| 10. | "Mother Wouldn't Do That" | Ronnie Self | 2:26 |
| 11. | "Poor Little Jimmie" | Don Wayne | 2:19 |
| 12. | "Call Me Mr. In-Between" | Harlan Howard | 2:40 |
