= The Lavender Cowboy =

"The Lavender Cowboy" was originally a 1923 humorous poem by American pulp editor and publisher Harold Hersey about an unmanly cowboy "with only two hairs on his chest" who comes out a hero. It was then set to music and appeared in the 1930 Western film Oklahoma Cyclone. Several versions have since been recorded.

It has been banned from radio airplay because the lyrics are considered suggestive of homosexuality.

== Lyrics ==
He was only a lavender cowboy
And the hairs on his chest were but two
He wanted to be a real hero
And do as the real heroes do

Erbecini's and other hair lotions
He would rub on his chest every night
But when he awoke in the morning
Not a new hair was in sight

He fought for Nellie, your honor
And he cleaned out a whole robber's nest
He died with his six guns a smokin'
But with only two hairs on his chest

Well they buried him out on the prairie
Where the coyotes howl every night
And in the place where his bones lay
Two cacti have grown into sight.

Other versions are somewhat less sympathetic to the hapless wrangler. In one, having failed to impress Nellie, he goes on a binge and breaks into the local saloon at night, "making off with the strawberry gin". This leads to his demise.

They shot the lavender cowboy
and said as they laid him to rest
"You're better off now boy
coz you can't be a cowboy
with only two hairs on your chest".
