= Charming Beauty Bright =

"(Once I courted a) Charming Beauty Bright" is an American folk song. It is found in both Southern and Northern states during the 19th Century. The song is about a man who finds a woman, leaves for seven years, and upon his return to his home he learns of her death.

== Lyrics ==
According to the Max Hunter collection, the lyrics are as follows:

Once't I courted
A charming beauty bright
I courted her by day
And I courted her by night
I courted her for love
An' love I did obtain
An' I'm sure she must have loved me
She had no reason to complain

So, I struck out
Californy for to go
To see if I
Could forget my love or no
O, seven long years
Been serving of my king
An' it's seven long years
Returning home again

When their Mother
Seen me coming
She'd wrung her hands an' cried
Saying, my daughter loves you dearly
An' for your sake, she died

O, then I was stroked
Like a man that was slain
Th tears, they poured down
Like showers of rain
Saying, o, ho, ho, ho
My grief I cannot bear
My true loves in 'er grave
An' I want to be there
