= Okeh Presents the Wayfaring Stranger =

Studio album by Burl Ives
- Released: August 1941
- Genre: Folk
- Label: Okeh

Alternative covers
- 1944 Columbia album with Flora's cover art

Okeh Presents the Wayfaring Stranger (Okeh K-3) is a 1941 album by Burl Ives consisting of four 10-inch records (78 rpm, 6315-6318). This set marked Ives' debut as a recording artist. He accompanies himself on the guitar as he sings 12 folk songs.

The same collection of songs was re-released as The Wayfaring Stranger by Columbia Records (C-103) on four 10-inch records (78 rpm, 36733-36736) in August 1944, with cover art by Jim Flora. This collection should not be confused with Ives' album The Wayfaring Stranger released on Asch in 1944 with different songs.

It was released again on Columbia (CL 6109) on one 10-inch microgroove record (33 1/3 rpm) in 1950, also with Flora's cover art.

In a 1990 interview, Flora said, "Burl Ives was a troublemaker. His wife handled his affairs and if you forgot some da-da-da, she was on the phone to the president of Columbia. I don’t know whether we had to do this over again or what."

== Track listing ==
Okeh Presents the Wayfaring Stranger record 1 track listing
Side	Track	Song Title
1.	1.	“Wee Cooper O'Fife”
1.	2.	“Riddle Song”
2.	1.	“Cowboy's Lament”

Okeh Presents the Wayfaring Stranger record 2 track listing
Side	Track	Song Title
1.	1.	“Tam Pierce”
2.	1.	“I Know Where I'm Going”
2.	2.	“I Know My Love”

=== Record 3 (Okeh 6317; Columbia 36735) ===
Side	Track	Song Title
1.	1.	“Peter Gray”
2.	1.	“Sweet Betsy from Pike”
2.	2.	“On Top of Old Smoky”

=== Record 4 (Okeh 6318; Columbia 36736) ===
Side	Track	Song Title
1.	1.	“Darlin' Cory”
2.	1.	“Leather-Winged Bat”
2.	2.	“Cotton-Eyed Joe”

== See also ==
- Burl Ives, The Wayfaring Stranger, Asch 345, 1944.
