= I Know Where I'm Going (folk song) =

Traditional Scottish ballad

"I Know Where I'm Going" is a traditional Scottish (some sources say Irish) ballad about a wealthy love-struck young woman pining for her "bonnie" lover Johnny who some say has a bad reputation. It has been noted since the early nineteenth century. It is Roud number 5701.

In some versions the lover is said to be 'black'. This may refer to him being an outlaw or of bad reputation.

== Chorus ==
The song contains the refrain

I know where I'm going

I know who's going with me

I know who I love

The devil/dear knows who I'll marry

Among traditional singers and "folk revivalists", the term in the fourth line is often pronounced “deil”, an old Scots version of “devil” (as in Robert Burns's “The Deil’s awa' wi' the Exciseman”), of which "dear" is likely a corruption.

== Notable recordings ==
It was recorded by Burl Ives on 31 March 1941 for his debut album Okeh Presents the Wayfaring Stranger.

It has also been recorded by Kathleen Ferrier, Julie Andrews, Odetta, The Weavers, The Fureys, The Clancy Brothers, Judy Collins, Barbara Dane, The Highwaymen, The Tarriers, The New Christy Minstrels, Harry Belafonte, Carolyn Hester, Richard Thompson and English singer Laura Wright.

Pete Seeger sang the song to open Episode 16 of his Rainbow Quest television program, originally broadcast on 26 February 1966.

The tune has also been used for a hymn or spiritual song, "I Know Why There's Music in the Quiet Summer Morning."

== Film ==
The Michael Powell and Emeric Pressburger film I Know Where I'm Going! (1945) got its title from this song at the suggestion of Powell's wife Frankie Reidy, and the song was orchestrated and used in the film. The tune is also used throughout the Nicholas Ray film noir They Live by Night (1948).
