= The Versatile Burl Ives! =

Studio album by Burl Ives
- Released: c. 1961
- Studios: Bradley Studios (Nashville, Tennessee)
- Length: 33:41

The Versatile Burl Ives! is a 1961 album by Burl Ives, containing his hit single "A Little Bitty Tear." The album reached No. 35 on Billboard's 1962 Pop Album Chart. In the same year, "A Little Bitty Tear" climbed to No. 1 on Billboard's Adult Contemporary Chart, No. 2 on the Country Singles Chart, and No. 9 on the Pop Singles Chart. The pop, country, and folk songs on this album were selected to highlight the folk singer's versatility. Some of his performances, such as his cover of Johnny Cash's "I Walk the Line," represent a significant departure from his earlier repertoire. Ives is accompanied by the Anita Kerr Singers and Owen Bradley's orchestra.

== Track listing ==
1. "Mockin' Bird Hill" (Vaughn Horton) – 2:34
2. "The Long Black Veil" (Danny Dill, Marijohn Wilkin) – 3:00
3. "Delia" (Traditional) – 2:56
4. "Forty Hour Week" (Carl Adams, Tommy Blake) – 2:31
5. "I Walk the Line" (Johnny Cash) – 2:40
6. "Royal Telephone" (Traditional) – 3:31
7. "Shanghaied" (Mel Tillis, Marijohn Wilkin) – 2:07
8. "Lenora, Let Your Hair Hang Down" (Paul Clayton) – 3:01
9. "A Little Bitty Tear" (Hank Cochran) – 2:03
10. "Oh, My Side" (Ken McGehen, Snow Smith) – 2:47
11. "Mama Don't Want No Peas an' Rice an' Cocoanut Oil" (L. Charles, L. Wolfe Gilbert) – 3:06
12. "The Almighty Dollar Bill" (Wayne Walker) – 3:25
