= A Little Bitty Tear =

1961 single by Burl Ives

Single by Burl Ives

from the album The Versatile Burl Ives!
- B-side: "Shanghied"
- Released: November 1961
- Recorded: February 15, 1961
- Studio: Bradley Studios (Nashville, Tennessee)
- Genre: Country, pop, Nashville sound
- Length: 2:02
- Label: Decca
- Songwriter: Hank Cochran
- Producer: Owen Bradley

Burl Ives singles chronology
"We Loves Ye Jimmy" (1959)	"A Little Bitty Tear" (1961)	"Funny Way of Laughin'" (1962)

"A Little Bitty Tear" is a song written by the American country songwriter Hank Cochran. It has been recorded by many musical acts, the first being American recording artist Ray Sanders (with The Anita Kerr Singers) in 1960. Burl Ives popularized the song with his release in 1961. It has since been recorded by others, including Wanda Jackson, Bing Crosby (for his 1965 album Bing Crosby Sings the Great Country Hits), Chet Atkins, The Shadows and Cochran himself.

== Burl Ives version ==
In a 1965 interview with Billboard magazine, Cochran stated that he wrote many songs in his car while commuting home from work, including "A Little Bitty Tear". "Nothing prompted the idea for" the song, it "just came into my mind."

Ives recorded the song for his album, The Versatile Burl Ives!, in 1961. This version was released as a single late in the year, and it became one of Ives' highest-charting hits early the next year. It made the top ten on the Billboard Hot 100 chart in February 1962, peaking at number nine. The song nearly topped the Billboard country music chart, spending two weeks in the runner-up slot, and it spent one week atop the Billboard Easy Listening chart at the end of February 1962. In Britain, the song spent two weeks at number nine on the UK Singles Chart in early 1962. Ives also earned Grammy nominations for the song in the categories Best Country & Western Recording and Best Male Solo Vocal Performance.

=== Chart performance ===
Chart (1961–62)	Peak position
Canada (CHUM Chart)	6
New Zealand (Lever Hit Parade)	8
Norwegian Singles Chart	5
UK Singles Chart	9
U.S. Billboard Hot 100	9
U.S. Billboard Easy Listening	1
U.S. Billboard Country Singles	2

== Wanda Jackson version ==
"A Little Bitty Tear"

Single by Wanda Jackson

from the album Wonderful Wanda
- B-side: "I Don't Wanta Go"
- Released: December 1961
- Recorded: April 20, 1961; Nashville, Tennessee, U.S.
- Genre: Country, Nashville sound
- Label: Capitol
- Songwriter: Hank Cochran
- Producer: Ken Nelson

Wanda Jackson singles chronology
"In the Middle of a Heartache" (1961)	"A Little Bitty Tear" (1961)	"If I Cried Every Time You Hurt Me" (1962)

In December 1961, American rockabilly and country artist Wanda Jackson released her version of Hank Cochran's "A Little Bitty Tear". Jackson's version was recorded two months following the recording session of Ives' version. The song was cut in Nashville, Tennessee, United States in the Bradley Film and Recording Studio on April 20, 1961. Also recorded on the session was Jackson's previous hit single, "In the Middle of a Heartache".

The single version of "A Little Bitty Tear" was released one month following the release of Burl Ives' version. Perhaps because of intertwining chart positions, Jackson's single version became a minor hit on the Billboard Hot 100, only reaching the number eighty-four in early 1962. The song was then issued onto Jackson's studio LP entitled, Wonderful Wanda.

=== Charts ===
Chart (1961)	Peak position
Australia Top 100 Singles (Kent Music Report)	38
US Billboard Hot 100	84

== Hank Cochran and Willie Nelson version ==
"A Little Bitty Tear"

Single by Hank Cochran and Willie Nelson

from the album Make the World Go Away
- B-side: "He's Got You"
- Released: October 1980
- Recorded: 1980
- Genre: Country
- Label: Elektra
- Songwriter: Hank Cochran
- Producers: Hank Cochran, Chuck Howard, Rock Killough

Hank Cochran and Willie Nelson singles chronology
"Make the World Go Away" (1980)	"A Little Bitty Tear" (1980)	"I Wish It Was That Easy Going Home" (1983)

With the release of his new studio album, Make the World Go Away, in 1980, Hank Cochran released his first official version of "A Little Bitty Tear". Cochran recorded the song with friend and American country artist, Willie Nelson. The duet version was recorded at the Richey House in Nashville, Tennessee, United States in early 1980. The session was also produced by Cochran, as well as Chuck Howard and Rock Killough. Nelson's guest vocals were not officially credited on the single or the album.

"A Little Bitty Tear" was then released as a single in October 1980. The song then entered the Billboard Hot Country Singles chart where it reached a peak of fifty-seven. The song became Cochran's highest-charting single since 1963 when "Sally Was a Good Ole Girl" reached the top-twenty of the country songs chart. The song was then issued onto Cochran's 1980 studio effort, Make the World Go Away, on Elektra Records.

=== Chart performance ===
Chart (1980)	Peak position
U.S. Billboard Hot Country Singles	57

== See also ==
- List of number-one adult contemporary singles of 1962 (U.S.)
