= Sweet Betsy from Pike =

American folk ballad

Song
- Published: 1858
- Genre: Ballad, western
- Lyricist: John A. Stone

"Sweet Betsy from Pike" is an American ballad about the trials of a pioneer named Betsy and her lover Ike who migrate from Pike County (theorized to be Pike County, Missouri) to California. This California gold rush-era song, with lyrics published by John A. Stone in 1858, was collected and published in Carl Sandburg's 1927 American Songbag. It was recorded by Burl Ives on February 11, 1941, for his debut album Okeh Presents the Wayfaring Stranger.

The melody derives from a popular English comic song "Villikins and his Dinah", first published in London in 1853 and which had become a hit in America by 1855. Villikins and his Dinah closely parodies the lyrics of an old street ballad extant in England from the early 19th century, William and Diana; but it is unclear whether it simply borrowed the same melody as the existing ballad it parodies, or used a different tune written especially for theatrical performance.

Members of the Western Writers of America chose it as one of the Top 100 Western songs of all time.

== Lyric ==
The most verifiable traditional lyrics, which are in the public domain, are:

Did you ever hear tell of Sweet Betsy from Pike,
Who crossed the wide mountains with her lover Ike,
Two yoke of cattle, a large yeller dog,
A tall Shanghai rooster, and a one-spotted hog.

Refrain
Singing too-ra-li-oo-ra-li-oo-ra-li-ay. (2)

They swam the wide rivers and crossed the tall peaks,
And camped on the prairie for weeks upon weeks.
Starvation and cholera, hard work and slaughter--
They reached California 'spite of hell and high water.

Refrain

One evening quite early they camped on the Platte,
Twas near by the road on a green shady flat.
Betsy, sore-footed, lay down to repose--
With wonder Ike gazed on that Pike County rose.

Refrain

Out on the prairie one bright starry night,
They broke out the whiskey and Betsy got tight.
She sang and she shouted and danced o'er the plain
And showed her bare arse to the whole wagon train.

Refrain

The Injuns came down in a thundering horde,
And Betsy was scared they would scalp her adored.
So under the wagon-bed Betsy did crawl
And she fought off the Injuns with musket and ball.

Refrain

The wagon broke down with a terrible crash,
And out on the prairie rolled all sorts of trash.
A few little baby-clothes, done up with care,
Looked rather suspicious, but all on the square.

Refrain

They stopped at Salt Lake to inquire of the way,
When Brigham declared that Sweet Betsy should stay.
Betsy got frightened and ran like a deer,
While Brigham stood pawing the ground like a steer.

Refrain

The alkali desert was burning and bare,
And Isaac's soul shrank from the death that lurked there.
"Dear old Pike County, I'll go back to you"--
Says Betsy, "You'll go by yourself if you do!"

Refrain

They soon reached the desert, where Betsy gave out,
And down in the sand she lay rolling about.
Ike in great wonder looked on in surprise,
Saying, "Betsy, get up, you'll get sand in your eyes."

Refrain

Sweet Betsy got up in a great deal of pain.
She declared she'd go back to Pike County again.
Ike gave a sigh, and they fondly embraced,
And they traveled along with his arm round her waist.

Refrain

The Shanghai ran off, and the cattle all died,
That morning the last piece of bacon was fried.
Ike got discouraged, Betsy got mad,
The dog drooped his tail and looked wonderfully sad.

Refrain

They suddenly stopped on a very high hill,
With wonder looked down upon old Placerville.
Ike said to Betsy, as he cast his eyes down,
"Sweet Betsy, my darling, we've got to Hangtown."

Refrain

Long Ike and Sweet Betsy attended a dance.
Ike wore a pair of his Pike County pants.
Betsy was covered with ribbons and rings.
Says Ike, "You're an angel, but where are your wings?"

Refrain

A miner said, "Betsy, will you dance with me?"
"I will that, old hoss, if you don't make too free.
Don't dance me hard, do you want to know why?
Doggone you, I'm chock-full of strong alkali."

Refrain

This Pike County couple got married, of course,
But Ike became jealous, and obtained a divorce.
Betsy, well-satisfied, said with a shout,
"Goodby, you big lummox, I'm glad you backed out!"

Refrain (4)

Sweet Betsy from Pike
