= Funny Way of Laughin' =

Single by Burl Ives

from the album It's Just My Funny Way of Laughin'
- B-side: "Mother Wouldn't Do That"
- Released: March 1962
- Genre: Folk
- Length: 2:43
- Label: Decca
- Songwriter: Hank Cochran

Burl Ives singles chronology
"A Little Bitty Tear" (1961)	"Funny Way of Laughin'" (1962)	"Call Me Mr. In-Between" (1962)

"Funny Way of Laughin'" is a song written by Hank Cochran and performed by Burl Ives. It reached #3 on the U.S. adult contemporary chart, #9 on the U.S. country chart, #10 on the U.S. pop chart, #18 on Canada's CHUM Chart, and #29 on the UK Singles Chart in 1962. It was featured on his 1962 album It's Just My Funny Way of Laughin'.

The song won the Grammy Award for Best Country & Western Recording at the 5th Annual Grammy Awards in 1963.

The song ranked #82 on Billboard magazine's Top 100 singles of 1962.

== Other versions ==
- Cochran released a version of the song on his 1963 album Hits from the Heart.
- Jeannie Seely released a version of the song as the B-side to her 1967 single "These Memories".
- Jim Ed Brown released a version of the song on his 1968 album Country's Best on Record.
