= Foggy Dew (English song) =

English folk song

"Foggy Dew" or "Foggy, Foggy Dew" is an English folk song with a strong presence in the South of England and the Southern United States in the nineteenth century. The song describes the outcome of an affair between a weaver and a girl he courted. It is cataloged as Laws No. O03 and Roud Folk Song Index No. 558. It has been recorded by many traditional singers including Harry Cox, and a diverse range of musicians including Benjamin Britten, Burl Ives, A. L. Lloyd and Ye Vagabonds have arranged and recorded popular versions of the song.

== History and lyrics ==
The song is a ballad, first published on a broadside in the early nineteenth century. Cecil Sharp collected eight versions of the song, particularly in Somerset, England, but also in the United States. Early versions of the song refer to her fear of the "bugaboo" rather than the foggy dew, as do many recent traditional American versions. In these older versions, an apprentice seduces his master's daughter with the help of a friend disguised as a ghost ("bugaboo" or "bogulmaroo"). "Bugaboo" changed to "the foggy dew", which seems to have sent the song in different directions.

Peter Kennedy, who collected several traditional English versions, has suggested that "Foggy Dew" is "an Englishman's attempt to pronounce the Irish orocedhu, which means "dark", or "black night"...", but also points to James Reeves' observation that "foggy" in Middle English refers to "coarse, rank marsh grass" whilst "dew" represents virginity or chastity.

A. L. Lloyd wrote the following about the nature of the song and its regional variants:

This true-life story is known in many forms. Sometimes the girl is frightened by a ghost: the "bugaboo". Sometimes she seems disturbed by the weather: the "foggy dew". Some say the foggy dew is a virginity symbol; others say the words are there by accident or corruption, and all the girl was pretending to be frightened of was ghosts. Whatever the case, she creeps to the roving bachelor for comfort, and gets what she came for. The Irish have it as a sentimental piece of blarney, the Scots as a brief bawdy guffaw; students have coarsened the song, and Benjamin Britten has refined it. The East Anglian country-folk have it straightest, and sing it without a laugh or a tear or a nudge in the ribs, just as it happened. The Foggy Dew is known all over Britain, yet rarely seen in its full form in print, which is odd, for the song is eminently decent in its best traditional forms. It's not a drinking song, but it's often sung in drinking places.

The following lyrics are the first two verses as sung by Norfolk farmworker and traditional singer Harry Cox in 1953:

As I was an old bachelor I followed a roving trade
And all the harm that ever I done I courted a servant maid.
I courted her one summer season and part of the winter, too,
And many a time I rolled my love all over the foggy dew.

One night as I laid in my bed, a-taking my balm of sleep,
This pretty fair maid came to me, and how bitterly she did weep.
She wept, she mourned, she tore her hair, crying, "Alas, what shall I do?
This night I resolved to sleep with you, for fear of the foggy dew."

== East Anglian version ==
The East Anglian version of the song (which inspired A.L. Lloyd and Ye Vagabonds) appears to have been particularly popular. A.L. Lloyd recorded Douglas Morling of Eastbridge, Suffolk singing this variant in 1938 or 1939. Harry Cox was recorded singing this version of the song on different occasions in 1953 by Alan Lomax (available online via the Alan Lomax archive) and Peter Kennedy. Alec Bloomfield of Benhall, Suffolk was also recorded by Kennedy in 1952, and the recording can be heard on the British Library Sound Archive website.

The tune used in these East Anglian versions was also used by Robert Burns from Ye Banks and Braes of Bonnie Doon. Peter Kennedy suggests that Burns may have heard the tune used in a "Border version", despite the fact that it seems particular to the East Anglian region. The tune has also been used for other traditional songs in Scotland, such as a recording of Maggie Stewart (Aunt of Jeannie Robertson) singing her version of Sir Hugh.

== Other traditional recordings ==
Other tunes have been recorded across England, particularly in the South, including two versions which can be heard via the Vaughan Williams Memorial Library from Sussex and Surrey.

The song was less frequently found in Scotland and Ireland. Willie Mathieson of Aberdeenshire, Scotland was recorded by Hamish Henderson singing a traditional version in 1952, with lyrics very similar to many English versions, which can be heard on Tobar an Dualchais.

A few traditional recordings have been made in the United States under the title of "The Bugaboo" and "The Foggy Dew", including those of Georgia Ann Griffin (1937), Dan Tate (1960) and Doug Wallin (1992–1993) in the Appalachian region, two recordings made by Alan Lomax in Michigan which can be heard on the Library of Congress website, and a version recorded in 1940 by Helen Hartness Flanders of Lena Bourne Fish of New Hampshire.

== Popular adaptations ==
Benjamin Britten arranged a version of the song for voice and piano in 1942. Britten's arrangement was a Suffolk variant, extremely similar to a traditional version sung by a Mrs. Saunders of Lingfield, Surrey in 1960 (audio available via Vaughan Williams Memorial Library). BBC Radio restricted broadcast of the song to programmes covering folk tunes or the works of Britten because of its suggestive nature. The tune is a late 18th- or early 19th-century revision of "When I First Came to Court", licensed in 1689.

Burl Ives popularized a version of the song called "The Foggy, Foggy Dew" in the United States in the 1940s, and was once jailed in Mona, Utah, for singing it in public, when authorities deemed it a bawdy song. He claimed that a version dated to colonial America.

A. L. Lloyd recorded a cover version of the song in 1956 after learning it from Douglas Morling of Eastbridge, Suffolk, a typical East Anglian version similar to those of Harry Cox and Alex Bloomfield listed above. A.L. Lloyd's recording inspired a popular 2019 version by Ye Vagabonds, who released it as the second track on their album The Hare's Lament.

Other prominent artists including Ewan MacColl (1958) and Shirley Collins (1958) recorded versions of the song.
