= Burl Ives =

American musician and actor (1909–1995)

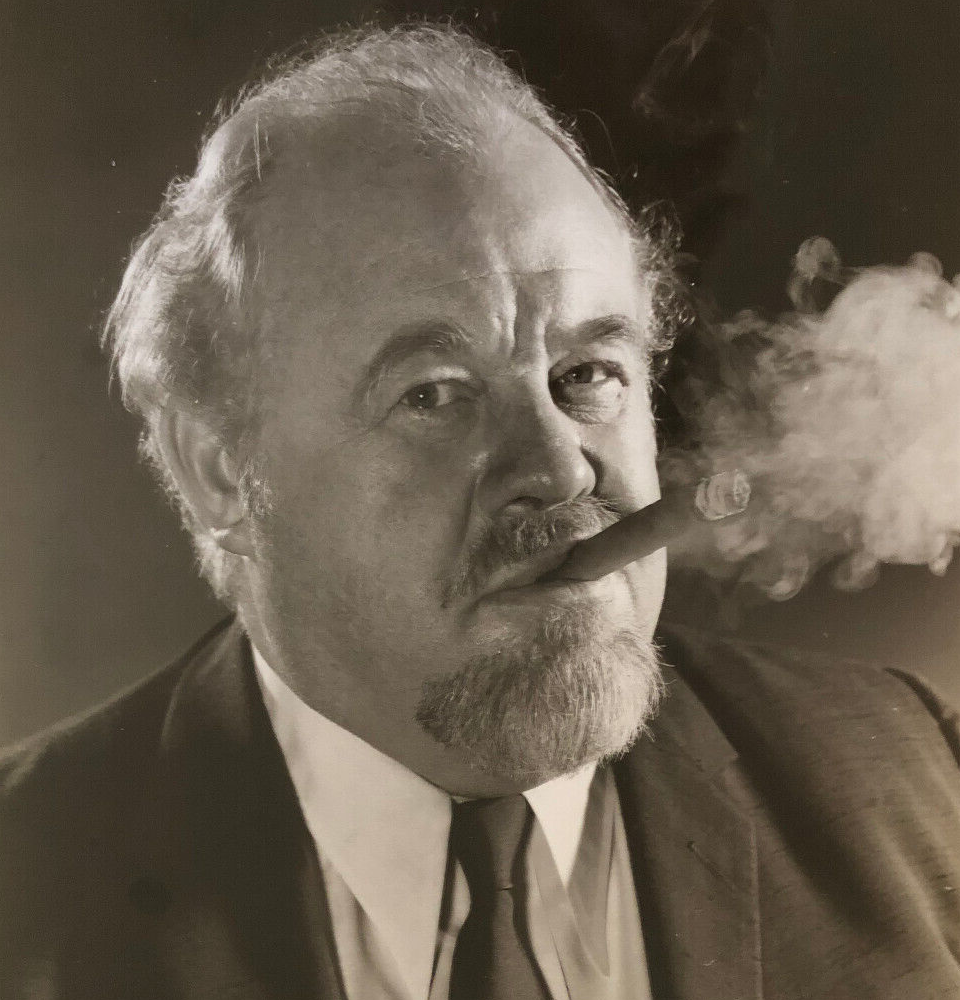
- Ives in Cat on a Hot Tin Roof (1958)
- Born: Burl Icle Ivanhoe Ives; June 14, 1909; Hunt City, Illinois, U.S.
- Died: April 14, 1995 (aged 85); Anacortes, Washington, U.S.
- Burial place: Mound Cemetery, Hunt City Township, Jasper County, Illinois
- Occupations: Musician; singer; actor; author
- Years active: 1929–1993
- Spouses: Helen Peck Ehrlich (m. 1945; div. 1971); Dorothy Koster Paul (m. 1971)
- Children: 1
- Awards: Silver Buffalo Award; Order of Lincoln; Academy Award
- Musical career
- Genres: Folk; country; blues; Christmas; traditional pop
- Instruments: Vocals; guitar; banjo

Burl Icle Ivanhoe Ives (June 14, 1909 – April 14, 1995) was an American singer and actor with a career that spanned more than six decades.

Ives began his career as an itinerant singer and guitarist, eventually launching his own radio show, The Wayfaring Stranger, which popularized traditional folk songs. In 1942, he appeared in Irving Berlin's This Is the Army and became a major star of CBS Radio. In the 1960s, Ives successfully crossed over into country music, recording hits such as "A Little Bitty Tear" and "Funny Way of Laughin'". He was also a popular film actor through the late 1940s and '50s. Ives's film roles included parts in So Dear to My Heart (1948) and Cat on a Hot Tin Roof (1958), as well as the role of Rufus Hannassey in The Big Country (1958), for which Ives won an Academy Award for Best Supporting Actor, and the film noir Day of the Outlaw (1959).

Ives is often associated with the Christmas season. He did voice-over work as Sam the Snowman, narrator of the classic 1964 Christmas television special Rudolph the Red-Nosed Reindeer. Ives also worked on the special's soundtrack, including the songs "A Holly Jolly Christmas" and "Rudolph the Red-Nosed Reindeer", both of which continue to chart annually on the Billboard holiday charts into the 2020s.

== Early life ==
Burl Icle Ivanhoe Ives was born on June 14, 1909, in Hunt City, an unincorporated town in Jasper County, Illinois, near Newton, to Levi "Frank" Ives (1880–1947) and Cordelia "Dellie" (née White; 1882–1954). He had six siblings: Audry, Artie, Clarence, Argola, Lillburn, and Norma. Frank was first a farmer and then a contractor for the county and others. One day, Ives was singing in the garden with Dellie, and his uncle overheard them. He invited his nephew to sing at the old soldiers' reunion in Hunt City. The boy performed a rendition of the folk ballad "Barbara Allen" and impressed both his uncle and the audience.

Ives graduated from Newton High School in 1927. From 1927 to 1929, he attended Eastern Illinois State Teachers College (now Eastern Illinois University) in Charleston, Illinois, where he played football. As a junior, Ives was sitting in English class, listening to a lecture on Beowulf, when he suddenly realized he was wasting his time. As Ives walked out of the door, the professor made a snide remark and Ives slammed the door behind him, shattering the window in the door. Sixty years later, the school named a building after its most famous dropout. Ives was a member of the Charleston Chapter of The Order of DeMolay and is listed in the DeMolay Hall of Fame. He was also initiated into Scottish Rite Freemasonry in 1927. In 1987, Ives was elevated to the 33rd and highest degree, and was later elected the Grand Cross.

On July 23, 1929, in Richmond, Indiana, Ives made a trial recording of "Behind the Clouds" for the Starr Piano Company's Gennett label, but the recording was rejected and destroyed a few weeks later. In his later years, Ives did not recall having made the record.

== Music career ==
=== 1930s–1940s ===
Ives traveled about the United States as an itinerant singer during the early 1930s, earning his way by doing odd jobs and playing his banjo. Ives was jailed in Mona, Utah, for vagrancy and for singing "Foggy Dew" (an English folk song), which the authorities decided was a bawdy song. Around 1931, he began performing on WBOW radio in Terre Haute, Indiana. Ives also went back to school, attending classes at Indiana State Teachers College (now Indiana State University). In 1933, he also attended the Juilliard School in New York. Five years later, Ives made his Broadway debut with a small role in Rodgers and Hart's hit musical, The Boys from Syracuse. In 1939, he joined his friend and fellow actor Eddie Albert, who had the starring role in The Boys from Syracuse, in Los Angeles. The two shared an apartment for a while in the Beachwood Canyon community of Hollywood.

In 1940, Ives named his own radio show, The Wayfaring Stranger, after a well known American folk spiritual of the same name. Over the next decade, Ives popularized several traditional folk songs, such as "Foggy Dew", "The Blue Tail Fly" (an old minstrel tune now better known as "Jimmy Crack Corn"), and "Big Rock Candy Mountain" (an old hobo song). He was also associated with the Almanacs, a folk-singing group which at different times included Woody Guthrie, Will Geer, Millard Lampell, and Pete Seeger. The Almanacs were active in the American Peace Mobilization (APM), a far-left group initially opposed to American entry into World War II and Franklin Roosevelt's pro-Allied policies. They recorded such songs as "Get Out and Stay Out of War" and "Franklin, Oh Franklin".

In June 1941, after the Axis invasion of the Soviet Union, the APM abandoned its pacifist stance and reorganized itself into the pro-war American People's Mobilization. Ives and the Almanacs rerecorded several of their songs to reflect the group's new stance in favor of U.S. entry into the war. Among them were "Dear Mr. President" and "Reuben James" (the name of a U.S. destroyer sunk by the Germans before the official U.S. entry into the war).

In early 1942, Ives was drafted into the U.S. Army. He spent time first at Camp Dix, then at Camp Upton, where he joined the cast of Irving Berlin's This Is the Army. Ives attained the rank of corporal. When the show went to Hollywood, he was transferred to the Army Air Forces. Ives was honorably discharged, apparently for medical reasons, in September 1943. Between September and December 1943, he lived in California with actor Harry Morgan. In December 1943, Ives went to New York City to work for CBS Radio for $100 a week. In 1944, he recorded The Lonesome Train, a ballad about the life and death of Abraham Lincoln, written by Earl Robinson (music) and Lampell (lyrics).

In 1946, Ives was cast as a singing cowboy in the film Smoky. The following year, he recorded one of many versions of "The Blue Tail Fly", but paired this time with the popular Andrews Sisters (Patty, Maxene, and LaVerne). The flip side of the record was a fast-paced "I'm Goin' Down the Road". Ives hoped the trio's success would help the record sell well, which it did, becoming both a best-selling disc and a Billboard hit.

Ives's version of the song "Lavender Blue" became his first hit and was nominated for an Academy Award for Best Original Song after Ives introduced it in the 1949 film So Dear to My Heart.

Music critic John Rockwell said, "Ives' voice ... had the sheen and finesse of opera without its latter-day Puccinian vulgarities and without the pretensions of operatic ritual. It was genteel in expressive impact without being genteel in social conformity. And it moved people".

=== 1950s ===
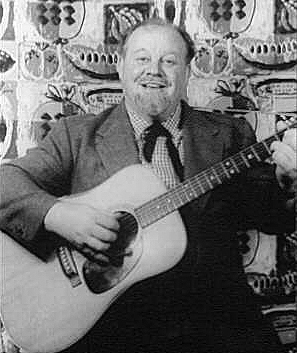
Ives in 1955, photographed by Carl Van Vechten

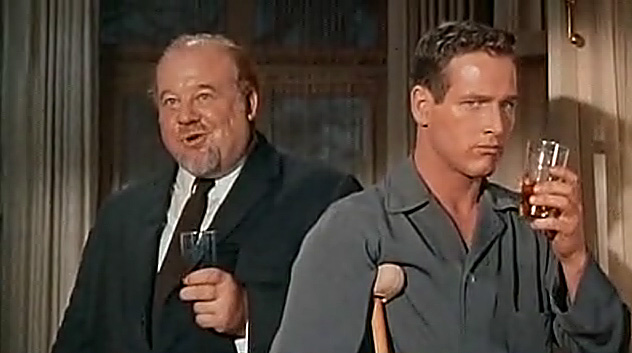
Ives (left) with Paul Newman in Cat on a Hot Tin Roof

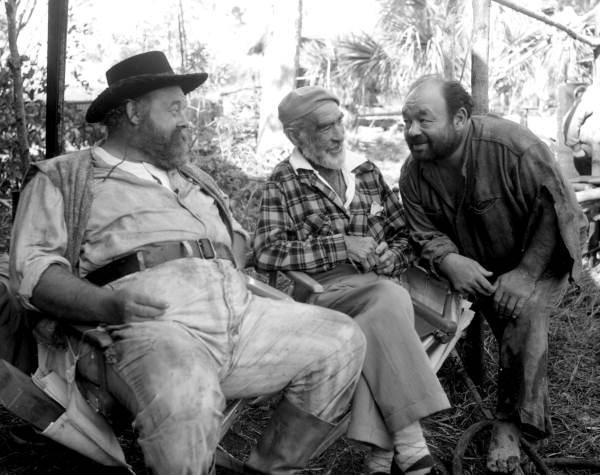
Ives while filming Wind Across the Everglades in 1957

Ives was identified in the 1950 pamphlet Red Channels and blacklisted as an entertainer with supposed Communist ties. Two years later, he cooperated with the House Un-American Activities Committee (HUAC) and agreed to testify, fearful of losing his source of income. Ives's statement to the HUAC ended his blacklisting, allowing him to continue acting in movies. However, it also led to a bitter rift between Ives and many folk singers, including Pete Seeger, because Ives provided at least four names and was therefore accused of betraying the cause of cultural and political freedom to save his own career. Seeger publicly ridiculed Ives for attempting to distance himself from many of the far-left organizations he had supported. In 1993, Ives, by then using a wheelchair, reunited with Seeger during a benefit concert in New York City, having reconciled years earlier. They sang "Blue Tail Fly" together.

External audio
- Wayfaring Stranger Burl Ives Performs at the Book and Author Luncheon, 17:33, Ives begins at 4:00, WNYC, 1954

Ives expanded his appearances in films during this decade. Ives' movie credits include the role of Sam the Sheriff of Salinas, California, in East of Eden, Big Daddy in Cat on a Hot Tin Roof, roles in Desire Under the Elms, Wind Across the Everglades, The Big Country, for which he won an Academy Award for Best Supporting Actor, Ensign Pulver, the sequel to Mister Roberts, and Our Man in Havana, based on the Graham Greene novel.

Barred for a while from American employment, Ives frequently played on BBC Radio's Children's Hour, with such favorites as "Big Rock Candy Mountain", "She'll Be Coming 'Round the Mountain", and "Lavender Blue". He also performed at the Royal Coronation festival in 1952, which purportedly was also attended by a young John Lennon and Paul McCartney.

Ives was the Mystery Guest on the August 7, 1955, and February 1, 1959, episodes of What's My Line.

=== 1960s–1990s ===
In the 1960s, Ives began singing country music with greater frequency. In 1962, he released three songs that were popular with both country music and popular music fans: "A Little Bitty Tear", "Call Me Mister In-Between", and "Funny Way of Laughin'". Ives' records, recorded in Nashville for Decca Records, were produced by Owen Bradley, one of the record producers who (along with Chet Atkins) helped define the Nashville Sound style of country music that expanded the music's appeal to a wider audience. Bradley used the Nashville A-Team of session musicians behind Ives, including the Anita Kerr Singers, which enhanced Ives's appeal. Bradley also produced the recording of Ives's perennial Holiday favorite "A Holly Jolly Christmas" in Nashville.

Ives had several film and television roles during the 1960s and 1970s. In 1961, he sang the folk song, "I Know an Old Lady Who Swallowed a Fly" for a short film of the same name produced by the National Film Board of Canada. The following year, Ives starred with Rock Hudson in The Spiral Road, which was based on a novel of the same name by Jan de Hartog. Ives also starred in Disney's Summer Magic with Hayley Mills, Dorothy McGuire, and Eddie Hodges, and a score by Robert and Richard Sherman. In 1964, he played the genie in the movie The Brass Bottle with Tony Randall and Barbara Eden.

Ives's "A Holly Jolly Christmas" and "Silver and Gold" became Christmas standards after they were first featured in the 1964 NBC-TV presentation of the Rankin/Bass stop-motion animated family special Rudolph the Red-Nosed Reindeer. Johnny Marks had composed the title song (originally an enormous hit for singing cowboy Gene Autry) in 1949, and producers Arthur Rankin, Jr. and Jules Bass retained him to compose the TV special's soundtrack. Ives voiced Sam the Snowman, the banjo-playing "host" and narrator of the story, explaining how Rudolph used his "nonconformity", as Sam refers to it, to save Christmas from being canceled due to an impassable blizzard. The following year, Ives rerecorded all three of the Johnny Marks hits that he had sung in the TV special, but with a more "pop" feel. Ives released them all as singles for the 1965 holiday season, capitalizing on their previous success. In 2022, 27 years after his death, "A Holly Jolly Christmas", made the Billboard Year-End chart.

Ives performed in other television productions, including Pinocchio and Roots.

Ives starred in short-lived O.K. Crackerby! (1965–66), a comedy that costarred Hal Buckley, Joel Davison, and Brooke Adams, about the presumed richest man in the world, which replaced Walter Brennan's somewhat similar The Tycoon on the ABC schedule from the preceding year.

Ives played Walter Nichols in the drama The Bold Ones: The Lawyers (1969–72), a segment of the wheel series The Bold Ones.

Ives narrated the 1971 season highlight film for the Washington Redskins of the National Football League produced by NFL Films. The Executive Producer was NFL Films founder Ed Sabol, and chief producer was Ed's son, Steve Sabol. Ed and Steve Sabol are members of the Pro Football Hall of Fame.

Ives occasionally starred in macabre-themed productions. In 1970, for example, he played the title role in The Man Who Wanted to Live Forever, in which his character attempts to harvest human organs from unwilling donors. In 1972, he appeared as old man Doubleday in the episode "The Other Way Out" of Rod Serling's Night Gallery, in which his character seeks a gruesome revenge for the murder of his granddaughter.

In honor of Ives's influence on American vocal music, he was awarded the University of Pennsylvania Glee Club Award of Merit on October 25, 1975. This award, initiated in 1964, was "established to bring a declaration of appreciation to an individual each year who has made a significant contribution to the world of music and helped to create a climate in which our talents may find valid expression."

When America Sings opened at Disneyland in 1974, Ives voiced the main host, Sam Eagle, an Audio-Animatronic.

In 1976, Ives was featured as a main character in Little House on the Prairie season 3 episode 10 titled "The Hunters". He played an old fur trapper who was blind and afraid to leave the comfort and safety of his cabin, which he shared with his adult son (Johnny Crawford). In this episode, Ives paired off with Laura Ingalls (Melissa Gilbert) to help rescue her injured father, who was accidentally shot while hunting for venison.

Ives lent his name and image to the U.S. Bureau of Land Management's "This Land Is Your Land – Keep It Clean" campaign in the 1970s. He was portrayed with the program's fictional spokesman, Johnny Horizon.

Ives was seen regularly in television commercials for Luzianne tea for several years during the 1970s and 1980s, when he was the company's commercial spokesman.

In 1982, Ives played Carruthers, a dog trainer, in Samuel Fuller's controversial and critically acclaimed film White Dog.

In 1989, Ives officially announced his retirement from show business on his 80th birthday. However, Ives continued to do occasional benefit concert performances of his own accord until 1993.

== Other work ==
=== Broadway roles ===
Ives's Broadway career included appearances in The Boys from Syracuse (1938–39), Heavenly Express (1940), This Is the Army (1942), Sing Out, Sweet Land (1944), Paint Your Wagon (1951–52), and Dr. Cook's Garden (1967). His most notable Broadway performance (later reprised in a 1958 movie) was as "Big Daddy" Pollitt in Cat on a Hot Tin Roof (1955–56).

=== Autobiography ===
Ives's autobiography, The Wayfaring Stranger, was published in 1948. He also wrote or compiled several other books, including Burl Ives' Songbook (1953), Tales of America (1954), Sea Songs of Sailing, Whaling, and Fishing (1956), and The Wayfaring Stranger's Notebook (1962).

=== Boy Scouts ===
Ives had a long-standing relationship with the Boy Scouts of America. He was a Lone Scout before that group merged with the Boy Scouts of America in 1924. The organization "inducted" Ives in 1966. Ives received the Boy Scouts' Silver Buffalo Award, its highest honor. The certificate for the award is on display at the Scouting Museum in Valley Forge, Pennsylvania.

Ives often performed at the quadrennial Boy Scouts of America jamboree, including the 1981 jamboree at Fort A.P. Hill in Virginia, where he shared the stage with the Oak Ridge Boys. There is a 1977 sound recording of Ives being interviewed by Boy Scouts at the National Jamboree at Moraine State Park, Pennsylvania. Ives was also the narrator of a 28-minute film about the 1977 National Jamboree. In the film, which was produced by the Boy Scouts of America, Ives "shows the many ways in which Scouting provides opportunities for young people to develop character and expand their horizons."

=== Western Illinois University ===
Ives maintained a connection to Macomb, Illinois through his brother who lived in Colchester, IL. During the 1970s and 1980s, Ives participated in fundraisers benefiting Western Illinois University (WIU) and performed on its campus on several occasions. Ives also donated personal and professional memorabilia-including recordings, props, private papers, and personal effects-to WIU's Archives and Special Collections. The university continues to hold collections related to Ives and his career.

== Civic awards ==
Ives was inducted as a laureate of the Lincoln Academy of Illinois and awarded the Order of Lincoln (the state's highest honor) by the governor of Illinois in 1976 in the area of the performing arts.

Ives was inducted into the DeMolay International Hall of Fame in June 1994.

== Personal life ==
On December 6, 1945, Ives, then 36, married 29-year-old script writer Helen Peck Ehrlich. Their son, Alexander, was born in 1949.

Ives and Ehrlich divorced in February 1971. Ives married Dorothy Koster Paul in London two months later. In their later years, Ives and Paul lived in a waterfront home in Anacortes, Washington, in the Puget Sound area, and in Galisteo, New Mexico, near the Turquoise Trail. In the 1960s, he had another home just south of Hope Town on Elbow Cay, a barrier island of the Abacos in the Bahamas.

== Death ==
Ives, a longtime smoker of pipes and cigars, was diagnosed with oral cancer in the summer of 1994. After several unsuccessful operations, he decided against further surgery. Ives fell into a coma and died from the disease on April 14, 1995, at his home in Anacortes, Washington; he was 85 years old. Ives was buried at Mound Cemetery in Hunt City Township, Jasper County, Illinois.
