= Billboard Top Country & Western Records of 1962 =

List of popular music

This is a list of Billboard magazine's ranking of the year's top country and western singles of 1962.

The year's No. 1 record was "Wolverton Mountain" by Claude King. The record debuted on Billboard's country and western chart in May 1962, spent nine weeks at the No. 1 spot, and remained on the chart for 26 weeks.

RCA Victor led all other labels with 13 records included on the year-end chart. Columbia Records followed with 10 records on the year-end chart.

Rank	Peak (Note: This column recites the record's peak position on Billboard's weekly charts.)	Title	Artist(s)	Label
1	1	"Wolverton Mountain"	Claude King	Columbia
2	1	"Misery Loves Company"	Porter Wagoner	RCA Victor
3	1	"She Thinks I Still Care"	George Jones	United Artists
4	1	"Charlie's Shoes"	Billy Walker	Columbia
5	2	"Adios Amigo"	Jim Reeves	RCA Victor
6	3	"A Wound Time Can't Erase"	Stonewall Jackson	Columbia
7	1	"She's Got You"	Patsy Cline	Decca
8	1	"Walk on By"	Leroy Van Dyke	Mercury
9	4	"Trouble's Back in Town"	The Wilburn Brothers	Decca
10	2	"Losing Your Love"	Jim Reeves	RCA Victor
11	3	"A Little Heartache"	Eddy Arnold	RCA Victor
12	2	"Lonesome Number One"	Don Gibson	RCA Victor
13	4	"The Comeback"	Faron Young	Capitol
14	1	"That's My Pa"	Sheb Wooley	M-G-M
15	2	"A Little Bitty Tear"	Burl Ives	Decca
16	1	"Devil Woman"	Marty Robbins	Columbia
17	1	"Mama Sang a Song"	Bill Anderson	Decca
18	5	"Alla My Love"	Webb Pierce	Decca
19	3	"Everybody But Me"	Ernest Ashworth	Hickory
20	5	"I Can Mend Your Broken Heart"	Don Gibson	RCA Victor
21	2	"Crazy"	Patsy Cline	Decca
22	3	"If a Woman Answers (Hang Up the Phone)"	Leroy Van Dyke	Mercury
23	5	"Unloved, Unwanted"	Kitty Wells	Decca
24	6	"Success"	Loretta Lynn	Decca
25	11	"Nobody's Fool But Yours"	Buck Owens	Capitol
26	3	"PT 109"	Jimmy Dean	Columbia
27	4	"It Keeps Right On a-Hurtin'"	Johnny Tillotson	Cadence
28	3	"Old Rivers"	Walter Brennan	Liberty
29	2	"I'm Gonna Change Everything"	Jim Reeves	RCA Victor
30	8	"Crazy Wild Desire"	Webb Pierce	Decca
31	3	"Soft Rain"	Ray Price	Columbia
32	1	"Big Bad John"	Jimmy Dean	Columbia
33	9	"Funny Way of Laughing"	Burl Ives	Decca
34	3	"Call Me Mr. In-Between"	Burl Ives	Decca
35	5	"Aching, Breaking Heart"	George Jones	Mercury
36	7	"Three Days"	Faron Young	Capitol
37	7	"Take Time"	Webb Pierce	Decca
38	11	"Air Mail to Heaven"	Carl Smith	Columbia
39	10	"Happy Journey"	Hank Locklin	RCA Victor
40	7	"What I Feel in My Heart"	Jim Reeves	RCA Victor
41		"I've Been Everywhere"	Hank Snow	RCA Victor
42	10	"When I Get Through with You"	Patsy Cline	Decca
43		"Tennessee Flat-Top Box"	Johnny Cash	Columbia
44		"If You Don't Know I Ain't Gonna Tell You"	George Hamilton IV	RCA Victor
45	7	"After Loving You"	Eddy Arnold	RCA Victor
46	7	"Tears Broke Out on Me"	Eddy Arnold	RCA Victor
47		"Willingly"	Shirley Collie & Willie Nelson	Liberty
48		"Footsteps of a Fool"	Judy Lynn	United Artists
49		"Touch Me"	Willie Nelson	Liberty
50		"Willie the Weeper"	Billy Walker	Columbia

== See also ==
- List of Hot Country Singles number ones of 1962
- List of Billboard Hot 100 number ones of 1962
- 1962 in country music
