= List of Hot Country Singles number ones of 1962 =

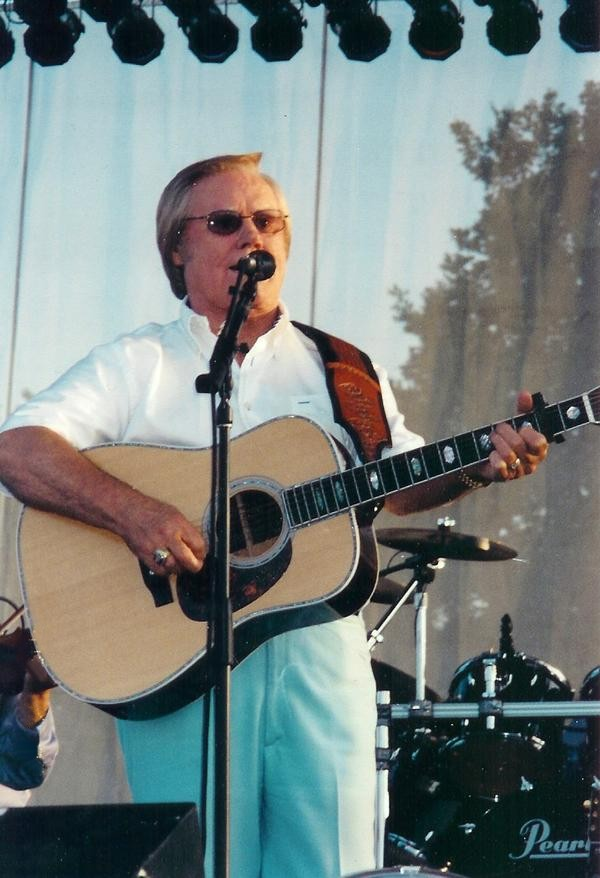
George Jones had a six-week run at number one with "She Thinks I Still Care".

Hot Country Songs is a chart that ranks the top-performing country music songs in the United States, published by Billboard magazine. In 1962, 11 different singles topped the chart in 52 issues of the magazine, based on playlists submitted by country music radio stations and sales reports submitted by stores. The chart was published under the title Hot C&W Sides through the October 27 issue and Hot Country Singles thereafter, a title it would retain until 1990.

In the issue of Billboard dated January 6, the number one song was "Walk On By" by Leroy Van Dyke, in its eleventh week in the top spot. The single remained atop the chart through the issue dated March 3 for a final total of nineteen weeks at number one. This figure set a record for the most weeks at number one on the Hot Country chart which would stand for more than 50 years until Florida Georgia Line spent 24 weeks at number one between December 2012 and August 2013 with the song "Cruise". Claude King tied Van Dyke for the most weeks spent at number one in the calendar year of 1962, with an unbroken run of nine weeks in the peak position with the song "Wolverton Mountain". Marty Robbins had an eight-week run at the top with "Devil Woman".

In 1962, Sheb Wooley reached number one with his first country chart entry, "That's My Pa", which spent one week in the top spot in March. Wooley had achieved success on the pop charts in 1958 with the million-selling novelty song "The Purple People Eater", but had never previously appeared on the country listing. In April, Billy Walker achieved the only chart-topper of his career with "Charlie's Shoes", and in June Claude King similarly topped the chart for the only time with "Wolverton Mountain". Both acts would continue to chart regularly well into the 1970s but would never repeat the success of their 1962 singles. In the issue of Billboard dated October 27, Bill Anderson reached the top spot for the first time with "Mama Sang a Song", and two weeks later Hank Snow achieved his first Hot Country number one with "I've Been Everywhere". Snow had gained several chart-toppers in the early 1950s when Billboard published multiple country music charts which tracked sales, jukebox plays and radio airplay separately, but "I've Been Everywhere" was his first number one since the magazine launched an overall listing in 1958. He would not top the chart again until 1974. The final number one of the year was "Don't Let Me Cross Over" by husband-and-wife duo Carl Butler and Pearl, another first-time chart-topper.

== Chart history ==
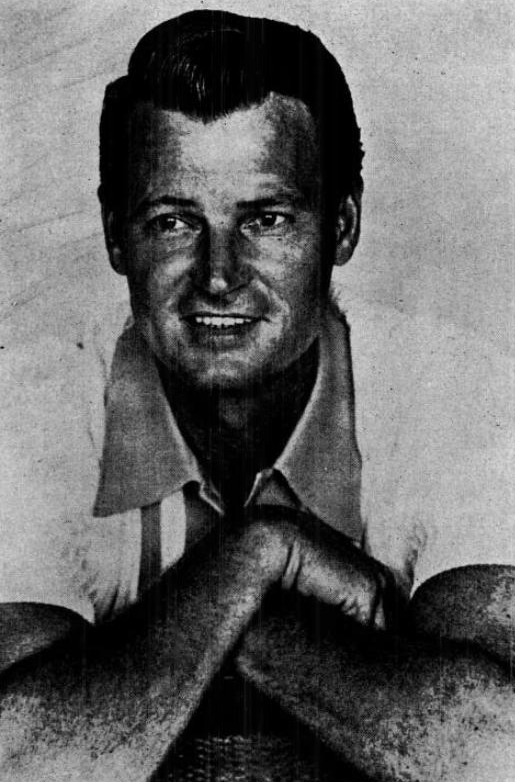
Claude King spent nine consecutive weeks at number one with "Wolverton Mountain".

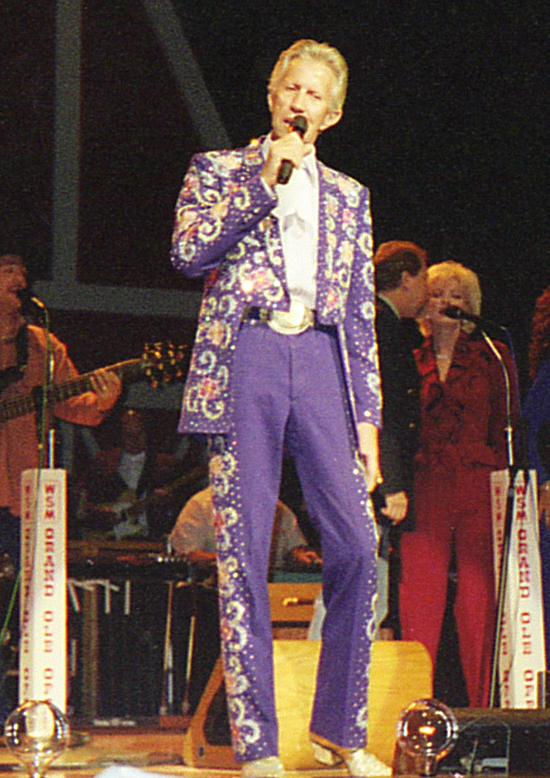
Porter Wagoner topped the chart with "Misery Loves Company".

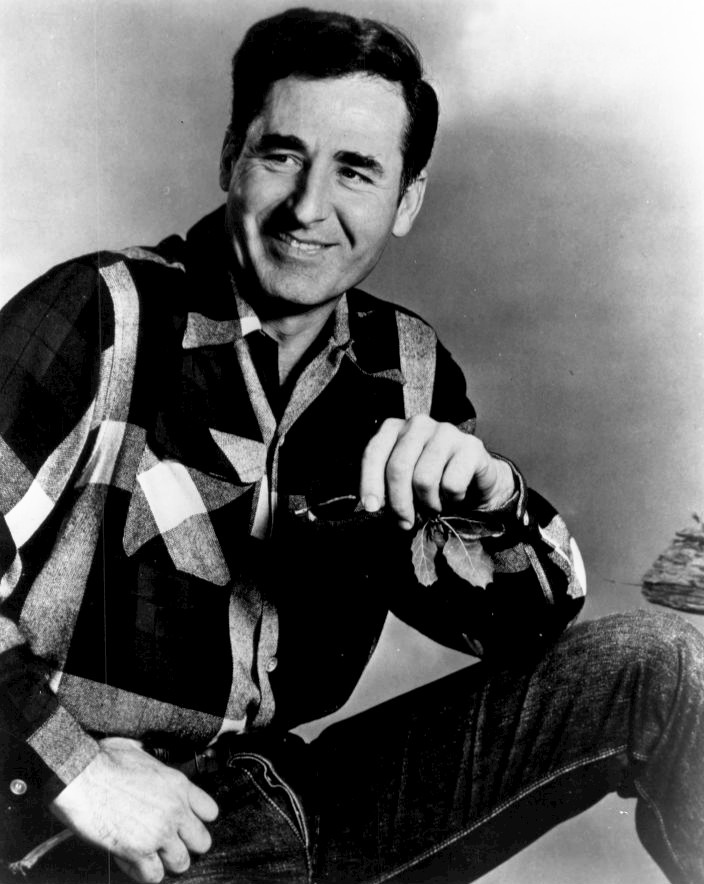
Sheb Wooley had had previous pop hits, but "That's My Pa" was his first country hit.

Chart history
Issue date	Title	Artist(s)	Ref.
January 6	"Walk On By"	Leroy Van Dyke	
January 13	"Walk On By"	Leroy Van Dyke	
January 20	"Walk On By"	Leroy Van Dyke	
January 27	"Walk On By"	Leroy Van Dyke	
February 3	"Walk On By"	Leroy Van Dyke	
February 10	"Walk On By"	Leroy Van Dyke	
February 17	"Walk On By"	Leroy Van Dyke	
February 24	"Walk On By"	Leroy Van Dyke	
March 3	"Walk On By"	Leroy Van Dyke	
March 10	"Misery Loves Company"	Porter Wagoner	
March 17	"That's My Pa"	Sheb Wooley	
March 24	"Misery Loves Company"	Porter Wagoner	
March 31	"She's Got You"	Patsy Cline	
April 7	"She's Got You"	Patsy Cline	
April 14	"She's Got You"	Patsy Cline	
April 21	"She's Got You"	Patsy Cline	
April 28	"Charlie's Shoes"	Billy Walker	
May 5	"She's Got You"	Patsy Cline	
May 12	"Charlie's Shoes"	Billy Walker	
May 19	"She Thinks I Still Care"	George Jones	
May 26	"She Thinks I Still Care"	George Jones	
June 2	"She Thinks I Still Care"	George Jones	
June 9	"She Thinks I Still Care"	George Jones	
June 16	"She Thinks I Still Care"	George Jones	
June 23	"She Thinks I Still Care"	George Jones	
June 30	"Wolverton Mountain"	Claude King	
July 7	"Wolverton Mountain"	Claude King	
July 14	"Wolverton Mountain"	Claude King	
July 21	"Wolverton Mountain"	Claude King	
July 28	"Wolverton Mountain"	Claude King	
August 4	"Wolverton Mountain"	Claude King	
August 11	"Wolverton Mountain"	Claude King	
August 18	"Wolverton Mountain"	Claude King	
August 25	"Wolverton Mountain"	Claude King	
September 1	"Devil Woman"	Marty Robbins	
September 8	"Devil Woman"	Marty Robbins	
September 15	"Devil Woman"	Marty Robbins	
September 22	"Devil Woman"	Marty Robbins	
September 29	"Devil Woman"	Marty Robbins	
October 6	"Devil Woman"	Marty Robbins	
October 13	"Devil Woman"	Marty Robbins	
October 20	"Devil Woman"	Marty Robbins	
October 27	"Mama Sang a Song"	Bill Anderson	
November 3	"Mama Sang a Song"	Bill Anderson	
November 10	"I've Been Everywhere"	Hank Snow	
November 17	"Mama Sang a Song"	Bill Anderson	
November 24	"Mama Sang a Song"	Bill Anderson	
December 1	"Mama Sang a Song"	Bill Anderson	
December 8	"Mama Sang a Song"	Bill Anderson	
December 15	"I've Been Everywhere"	Hank Snow	
December 22	"Mama Sang a Song"	Bill Anderson	
December 29	"Don't Let Me Cross Over"	Carl Butler and Pearl	

== See also ==
- 1962 in music
- 1962 in country music
- List of artists who reached number one on the U.S. country chart
