= 1962 in country music =

This is a list of notable events in country music that took place in 1962.

== Events ==
- September 25 – Loretta Lynn is inducted into the Grand Ole Opry at 30 years of age.
- November 3 — Billboard renames its Hot C&W Sides chart "Hot Country Singles," a name it will keep for the next 27 years. The chart length remains 30 positions.

=== No dates ===
- Rhythm and blues singer Ray Charles releases his landmark album Modern Sounds in Country and Western Music. The album of pop-styled covers of country standards is vastly influential in the genre.

== Top hits of the year ==
=== Number one hits ===
==== United States ====
(as certified by Billboard)

Date	Single Name	Artist	Wks. No.1	Spec. Note
March 10	Misery Loves Company	Porter Wagoner	2	^{[2]}: Returns to Number One March 24.; Wagoner's first Billboard Number One since "A Satisfied Mind" in 1955.
March 17	That's My Pa	Sheb Wooley	1	^{[C]}
March 31	She's Got You	Patsy Cline	5	^{[2], [B]}: Returns to Number One May 5.
April 28	Charlie's Shoes	Billy Walker	2	^{[2],[C]}: Returns to Number One May 12.
May 19	She Thinks I Still Care	George Jones	6
June 30	Wolverton Mountain	Claude King	9	^{[1], [C]}
September 1	Devil Woman	Marty Robbins	8
October 27	Mama Sang a Song	Bill Anderson	7	^{[2], [A]}: Returns to Number One on November 17, and then on December 22.
November 10	I've Been Everywhere	Hank Snow	2	^{[2]}: Returns to Number One December 15.; Snow's first Billboard Number One since "Let Me Go, Lover!" in 1954.
December 29	Don't Let Me Cross Over	Carl Butler and Pearl	11	^{[2], [C]}: Returns to Number One on January 12, January 26, and then on February 16.

Notes

- 1 No. 1 song of the year, as determined by Billboard.
- 2 Song dropped from No. 1 and later returned to top spot.
- A First Billboard No. 1 hit for that artist.
- B Last Billboard No. 1 hit for that artist.
- C Only Billboard No. 1 hit for that artist to date.

=== Other major hits ===
US	Single	Artist
5	Aching, Breaking Heart	George Jones
2	Adios Amigo	Jim Reeves
7	After Loving You	Eddy Arnold
11	Air Mail to Heaven	Carl Smith
5	Alla My Love	Webb Pierce
13	Anywhere There's People	Lawton Williams
16	The Best Dressed Beggar (In Town)	Carl Smith
12	Big Fool of the Year	George Jones
16	Black Cloud	Leroy Van Dyke
10	The Burning of Atlanta	Claude King
16	The Cajun Queen	Jimmy Dean
3	Call Me Mr. In-Between	Burl Ives
10	Cold Dark Waters	Porter Wagoner
7	The Comancheros	Claude King
4	The Comeback	Faron Young
5	Cow Town	Webb Pierce
2	Crazy	Patsy Cline
8	Crazy Wild Desire	Webb Pierce
20	Daddy Stopped In	Claude Gray
10	Day Into Night	Kitty Wells
9	Dear Ivan	Jimmy Dean
18	Don't Go Near the Eskimos	Ben Colder
4	Don't Go Near the Indians	Rex Allen
3	Everybody but Me	Ernest Ashworth
7	Footsteps of a Fool	Judy Lynn
9	Funny Way of Laughin'	Burl Ives
14	Get a Little Dirt on Your Hands	Bill Anderson
3	A Girl I Used to Know	George Jones
13	Go On Home	Patti Page
10	Happy Journey	Hank Locklin
11	He Stands Real Tall	Del Reeves
8	Hello Out There	Carl Belew
11	Honky Tonk Man	Johnny Horton
7	(How Can I Write On Paper) What I Feel in My Heart	Jim Reeves
5	I Can Mend Your Broken Heart	Don Gibson
17	I Can't Stop (My Lovin' You)	Buck Owens
9	I Guess I'll Never Learn	Charlie Phillips
2	I'm Gonna Change Everything	Jim Reeves
16	I'm Looking High and Low for My Baby	Ernest Tubb
12	I've Just Destroyed the World (I'm Loving In)	Ray Price
3	If a Woman Answers (Hang Up the Phone)	Leroy Van Dyke
6	If You Don't Know I Ain't Gonna Tell You	George Hamilton IV
8	In the Jailhouse Now	Johnny Cash
6	In the Middle of a Heartache	Wanda Jackson
4	It Keeps Right On a-Hurtin'	Johnny Tillotson
16	Just Ain't	Flatt & Scruggs
20	Kentucky Means Paradise	Glen Campbell
8	Kickin' Our Hearts Around	Buck Owens
9	Leona	Stonewall Jackson
20	A Letter to My Heart	Jim Reeves
2	A Little Bitty Tear	Burl Ives
10	Little Black Book	Jimmy Dean
3	A Little Heartache	Eddy Arnold
2	Lonesome Number One	Don Gibson
2	Losing Your Love	Jim Reeves
12	Love Can't Wait	Marty Robbins
7	My Name Is Mud	James O'Gwynn
11	Nobody's Fool but Yours	Buck Owens
3	Old Rivers	Walter Brennan
11	One Look at Heaven	Stonewall Jackson
13	Open Pit Mine	George Jones
3	PT-109	Jimmy Dean
5	Pride	Ray Price
18	Pride Goes Before a Fall	Jim Reeves
20	Sally Was a Good Old Girl	Hank Cochran
11	Save the Last Dance for Me	Buck Owens
18	Second Choice	Stonewall Jackson
11	Send Me the Pillow You Dream On	Johnny Tillotson
18	Shame on Me	Bobby Bare
16	Silver Threads and Golden Needles	The Springfields
17	Slow Poison	Johnnie & Jack
14	So Wrong	Patsy Cline
16	Somebody Save Me	Ferlin Husky
12	Sometimes I'm Tempted	Marty Robbins
17	Sometimes You Just Can't Win	George Jones
19	Sooner or Later	Webb Pierce
6	Success	Loretta Lynn
7	Take Time	Webb Pierce
7	Tears Broke Out on Me	Eddy Arnold
11	Tennessee Flat Top Box	Johnny Cash
8	Then a Tear Fell	Earl Scott
17	There's Always One (Who Loves a Lot)	Roy Drusky
7	Three Days	Faron Young
15	To a Sleeping Beauty	Jimmy Dean
7	Touch Me	Willie Nelson
4	Trouble's Back in Town	The Wilburn Brothers
18	Under the Cover of Night	Dave Dudley
5	Unloved Unwanted	Kitty Wells
10	The Violet and the Rose	Little Jimmy Dickens
5	Wall to Wall Love	Bob Gallion
11	Waltz of the Angels	George Jones and Margie Singleton
13	The Waltz You Saved for Me	Ferlin Husky
7	We Missed You	Kitty Wells
14	We're Gonna Go Fishin'	Hank Locklin
10	When I Get Through with You	Patsy Cline
9	Where I Ought to Be	Skeeter Davis
15	Where the Old Red River Flows	Jimmie Davis
8	Will Your Lawyer Talk to God	Kitty Wells
5	Willie the Weeper	Billy Walker
10	Willingly	Willie Nelson and Shirley Collie
3	A Wound Time Can't Erase	Stonewall Jackson
15	You Take the Future (And I'll Take the Past)	Hank Snow

== Top new album releases ==
Album	Artist	Record Label
All Aboard the Blue Train	Johnny Cash	Sun
George Jones Sings Bob Wills	George Jones	United Artists
Happy Journey	Hank Locklin	RCA
Homecoming in Heaven	George Jones	United Artists
Hymns from the Heart	Johnny Cash	Columbia
Modern Sounds in Country and Western Music	Ray Charles	ABC-Paramount
My Favorites of Hank Williams	George Jones	United Artists
Sentimentally Yours	Patsy Cline	Decca
The Sound of Johnny Cash	Johnny Cash	Columbia
Wonderful Wanda	Wanda Jackson	Capitol

=== Other top releases ===
Album	Artist	Record Label
According to My Heart	Goldie Hill	Decca
Bashful Brother Oswald	Bashful Brother Oswald	Starday
Bill Anderson Sings Country Heart Songs	Bill Anderson	Decca
Caribbean Guitar	Chet Atkins	RCA
Cross Country	Webb Pierce	Decca
Devil Woman	Marty Robbins	Columbia
Down Home	Chet Atkins	RCA
Family Favorites	Wilma Lee and Stoney Cooper with the Clinch Mountain Clan	Hickory
Hank Locklin	Hank Locklin	RCA
Homer and Jethro and the Convention	Homer and Jethro	RCA
Live It Up, Laugh it Up	Johnny Bond	Starday
The Lightning Fingers of Roy Clark	Roy Clark	Capitol
Marty After Midnight	Marty Robbins	Columbia
The New Favorites of George Jones	George Jones	United Artists
Night Life	Ray Price	Columbia
Old Rivers	Walter Brennan	Liberty
One More Time	Eddy Arnold	RCA
Our Man Down South	Eddy Arnold	RCA
Porter Wagoner and Skeeter Davis Sing Duets	Porter Wagoner and Skeeter Davis	RCA
A Touch of Velvet	Jim Reeves	RCA
A Tribute to Roy Acuff: The King of Country Music	Hank Locklin	RCA
You're for Me	Buck Owens	Capitol

== Births ==
- January 13 — Trace Adkins, singer-songwriter whose style meshes honky-tonk and dance-influenced rock.
- February 4 — Clint Black, first major new star of the 1990s and key player in the new traditionalist movement.
- February 6 — Richie McDonald, former lead singer of Lonestar.
- February 7 — Garth Brooks, the man who revolutionalized country music and forever changed its direction during the 1990s.
- February 11 — Sheryl Crow, pop singer who has also had substantial success as a country singer starting in the 2000s.
- April 2 — Billy Dean, contemporary-styled singer-songwriter who had the peak of his success in the 1990s.
- May 2 — Ty Herndon, contemporary-styled singer who had most of his success in the mid-to-late 1990s.
- July 13 - Victoria Shaw, singer-songwriter since the 1990s.
- August 23 — Emilio Navaira, singer-songwriter of country and Tejano music (died 2016).
- October 13 - John Wiggins, singer-songwriter since the 1990s.
- November 26 — Linda Davis, prominent backing vocalist who had a series of solo hits in the 1990s.
- December 7 - Andy Childs, singer-songwriter since the 1990s.

== Country Music Hall of Fame Inductees ==
- Roy Acuff (1903–1992)

== Major awards ==
=== Grammy Awards ===
- Best Country and Western Recording — "Funny Way of Laughin'", Burl Ives

== Other links ==
- Country Music Association
- Inductees of the Country Music Hall of Fame
