= Country Keepsakes =

Studio album by Wanda Jackson
- Released: March 1973
- Recorded: October 1972 – January 1973
- Studio: Jack Clement Studio
- Genre: Country
- Label: Capitol
- Producer: Joe Allison

Wanda Jackson chronology
Country Gospel (1973)	Country Keepsakes (1973)	When It's Time to Fall in Love Again (1974)

Singles from Country Keepsakes
- 1. "Tennessee Women's Prison" Released: December 1972; 2. "Your Memory Comes and Gets Me" Released: May 1973

Country Keepsakes is a studio album by American recording artist Wanda Jackson. It was released in March 1973 via Capitol Records and contained ten tracks. The album was Jackson's twenty first studio recording and her final recording issued on the Capitol label. The record was a collection of country songs she made with Capitol to fulfill requirements in her contract before signing with Word Records.

== Background ==
Wanda Jackson signed with Capitol Records in 1956, recording a series of Rockabilly selections before transitioning into country music in the 1960s. She had significant commercial success in the years that followed. In 1971, Jackson discovered Christianity and decided to record more religious material, beginning with 1972's Praise the Lord. Jackson signed with Word Records in 1973 so she could further pursue religious music. To fulfill obligations in her Capitol recording contract, Jackson released one final country album in 1973, which would be Country Keepsakes.

== Content ==
The project was recorded between October 1972 and January 1973 at the Jack Clement Studio in Nashville, Tennessee. Sessions were produced by Joe Allison, whom Jackson had not recorded with before. Country Keepsakes was a collection of ten tracks. The album consisted of country music selections, including covers of "You Took Him Off My Hands" and "A Wound Time Can't Erase". A gospel version of "There Goes My Everything" titled "He Is My Everything" is also featured. Several original recordings were also part of the project, such as "Tennessee Women's Prison".

== Release and reception ==
Professional ratings
Review scores
Source	Rating
AllMusic	2/5 stars

Country Keepsakes was originally released in March 1973 on Capitol Records. The project marked Jackson's twenty first studio album and her final to be released on Capitol. It was originally issued as a vinyl LP, containing five selections on either side of the record. In later decades, it was re-released on Capitol Records Nashville to digital and streaming markets, such as Apple Music.

The original LP spent three weeks charting on the Billboard Top Country Albums list, peaking at number 43 in May 1973. It was Jackson's last album to chart on the list until 2012. Although a full review was not provided, AllMusic would later give the album a two-star rating. Two singles were released from the project, beginning with "Tennessee Women's Prison" in December 1972. It was then followed by "Your Memory Comes and Gets Me" in May 1973.

== Track listings ==
Side one
No.	Title	Writer(s)	Length
1.	"Reuben James"	Alex Harvey; Barry Etris	2:55
2.	"A Wound Time Can't Erase"	Bill Johnson	3:01
3.	"Roll with the Tide"	Felice and Boudleaux Bryant	2:45
4.	"You Took Him Off My Hands"	Harlan Howard; Skeets McDonald; Wynn Stewart	2:45
5.	"I Don't Believe I'll Fall in Love Today"	Howard	2:41

Side two
No.	Title	Writer(s)	Length
1.	"Tennessee Women's Prison"	Ron Hellard; Gary S. Paxton	2:59
2.	"I Don't Know How to Tell Him"	Glenn Martin	2:48
3.	"Your Memory Comes and Gets Me"	Bill Graham; Tommy Jackson	2:45
4.	"Pass Me By"	Hillman Hall	2:30
5.	"He Is My Everything"	Dallas Frazier	2:50

== Chart performance ==
Chart (1973)	Peak position
US Top Country Albums (Billboard)	43

== Release history ==
Region	Date	Format	Label	Ref.
Canada; United States	March 1973	Vinyl	Capitol Records	
United States	2010s	Digital; Streaming	Capitol Records Nashville	
