= Meet Claude King =

Studio album by Claude King
- Released: 1962
- Genre: Country
- Label: Columbia

Claude King chronology
Meet Claude King (1962)	Tiger Woman (1965)

Meet Claude King is the debut studio album by country music singer Claude King. It was released in 1962 by Columbia Records (catalog no. CS-8610). The album includes King's No. 1 Country single, "Wolverton Mountain". "Big River, Big Man" and "The Comancheros" were also successful, both peaking at No. 7 on the same chart.

In Billboard magazine's annual poll of country and western disc jockeys, it was ranked No. 2 among the "Favorite Country Music LPs" of 1962.

== Track listing ==
Side A

1. "The Comancheros"
2. "You're Breaking My Heart"
3. "I'm Just Here to Get My Baby Out of Jail"
4. "Give Me Your Love and I'll Give You Mine"
5. "Big River, Big Man"
6. "Sweet Lovin'"

Side B

1. "Wolverton Mountain"
2. "Would You Care?"
3. "Pistol Packin' Papa"
4. "Little Bitty Heart"
5. "I Can't Get Over the Way You Got Over Me"
6. "I Backed Out"
