= Country Gospel (album) =

Studio album by Wanda Jackson
- Released: January 1973
- Recorded: November 1972
- Studio: Jack Clement Recording (Nashville, Tennessee)
- Genre: Country gospel; gospel
- Label: Word
- Producer: Billy Ray Hearn

Wanda Jackson chronology
I Wouldn't Want You Any Other Way (1972)	Country Gospel (1973)	Country Keepsakes (1973)

Country Gospel is a studio album by American recording artist Wanda Jackson. It was released in January 1973 via Word Records and contained 11 tracks. The album was Jackson's twentieth released in her career and her second collection of gospel music. It was also her first album issued on the Word record label, after nearly twenty years recording for Capitol Records.

== Background and content ==
Wanda Jackson had recently left Capitol Records after recording a mixture of Rockabilly and country selections, such as "Let's Have a Party" (1960), "Right or Wrong" and "The Box It Came In" (1966). In 1971, she discovered Christianity, which led to the decision to record more gospel material. According to Jackson, she was given an early release from Capitol's roster in 1973 to pursue a gospel contract with Word Records. The reasoning behind signing Jackson was so Word could "take the company to all markets in a full-scale operation," according to Billboard.

Jackson went into the studio with producer Billy Ray Hearn in November 1972 to record a collection of gospel tracks for her first Word release. The session was cut at the Jack Clement Recording Studio, located in Nashville, Tennessee. The album consisted of 11 songs. The final track was a self-penned tune written by Jackson. It also included covers of "Why Me, Lord" and "I Saw the Light".

== Release and reception ==
Professional ratings
Review scores
Source	Rating
AllMusic	2/5 stars

Country Gospel was released in January 1973 on Word Records, becoming Jackson's twentieth studio album released in her career. It also marked her first release for the Word company. The album was originally distributed as a vinyl LP, containing six songs on "side A" and five songs on "side B". Although a full review was not provided, AllMusic rated the album, giving it only two stars. The album failed to reach any notable charting positions, including the Billboard Top Country Albums survey, which Jackson's albums often made appearances on. She would record several more gospel and country albums for the Word and Myrrh record labels during the 1970s. However, these albums lacked any commercial success.

== Track listing ==
Side one
No.	Title	Writer(s)	Length
1.	"I Love You, Jesus"	Dallas Frazier; Arthur Leo Owens	2:28
2.	"I Saw the Light"	Hank Williams	2:40
3.	"Jesus Cares for Me"	Aaron Brown; Larry Lee	3:30
4.	"Turn Your Radio On"	Albert E. Brumley	2:25
5.	"I'd Rather Have Jesus"	George Beverly Shea	2:58
6.	"All in All"	Linda England	1:44

Side two
No.	Title	Writer(s)	Length
1.	"I Know"	James Tripp	2:54
2.	"Why Me, Lord"	Kris Kristofferson	3:15
3.	"Special Kind of Man"	Ray Hildebrand	3:26
4.	"Farther Along"	W.B. Stevens	3:32
5.	"Let Go...Let Jesus"	Wanda Jackson	2:18

== Personnel ==
All credits are adapted from the liner notes of Country Gospel.

Musical personnel

- Joe Babcock – Background vocals
- Kenneth Buttrey – Drums
- Jerry Carrigan – Drums
- Ray Edenton – Guitar
- Dolores Edgin – Background vocals
- Hurshel Wiginton – Background vocals
- Wanda Jackson – Lead vocals
- Weldon Myrick – Steel guitar
- June Page – Background vocals
- Billy Sanford – Guitar
- Jerry Shook – Guitar
- Jerry Smith – Piano
- Jack Williams – Bass

Technical personnel

- Dick Cobb – Photography
- Billy Ray Hearn – Producer
- Farrell Morris – Percussion
- Charlie Tallent – Engineer
- Bill Williams – Liner notes

== Release history ==
Region	Date	Format	Label	Ref.
Canada; United States	January 1973	Vinyl	Word Records	
United Kingdom	January 1973	Vinyl	Word Records	
