= Make Me Like a Child Again =

Studio album by Wanda Jackson
- Released: March 1976
- Recorded: Fall 1975
- Studio: Creative Workshop (Nashville, Tennessee)
- Genre: Gospel
- Label: Myrrh
- Producer: Billy Ray Hearn

Wanda Jackson chronology
Now I Have Everything (1975)	Make Me Like a Child Again (1976)	I'll Still Love You (1976)

Singles from Make Me Like a Child Again
- 1. "Touring That City" Released: 1975

Make Me Like a Child Again is a studio album by American recording artist Wanda Jackson. It was released in March 1976 via Myrrh Records and contained ten tracks. The disc was Jackson's twenty-fourth studio album and her fourth to consist entirely of gospel songs. One single was issued from the album in 1975 titled "Touring That City".

== Background and content ==
Before her gospel material, Wanda Jackson reached commercial success in the Rockabilly and country music fields with singles like "Let's Have a Party" and "Right Wrong". After dedicating her life to Christianity in 1971, Jackson left her long-time label to record gospel (in combination with country music) for Word Records. Among her gospel releases was Make Me Like a Child Again. The project was recorded in the fall of 1975 at the Creative Workshop, a studio located in Nashville, Tennessee. Sessions were produced by Billy Ray Hearn. A total of ten gospel recordings comprised the album. Among these tracks were covers of "Victory in Jesus", "Lord I'm Coming Home", Marilyn Sellars' "One Day at a Time" and Bill Gaither's "Because He Lives".

== Release and singles ==
Make Me Like a Child Again was released on Myrrh Records in March 1976. It was Jackson's twenty fourth studio collection released in her career and her third Myrrh release. The album was distributed as a vinyl LP, containing five songs on either side of the record. It also was distributed as a cassette. The album failed to reach any Billboard chart positions, notably the Top Country Albums survey, which Jackson's albums often made appearances on. She would record several more gospel and country albums for the Word and Myrrh record labels during the 1970s. However, these albums lacked any commercial success. In her autobiography, Jackson reflected on the album's release and found that the record was "not very memorable" in comparison with her other gospel albums. "Touring That City" was the only single that appeared on the album, released on Myrrh in 1975.

== Track listing ==
Side one (Vinyl and cassette versions)
No.	Title	Writer(s)	Length
1.	"Make Me Like a Child Again"	Judy Gerault	3:01
2.	"Fill My Cup, Lord"	Richard Blanchard	2:41
3.	"Victory in Jesus"	Eugene Monroe Bartlett	2:25
4.	"One Day at a Time"	Kris Kristofferson; Marijohn Wilkin	3:26
5.	"Say I Do"	Ray Hildebrand	2:34

Side two (Vinyl and cassette versions)
No.	Title	Writer(s)	Length
1.	"Touring That City"	Harold Lane	2:29
2.	"Scars in the Hands of Jesus"	Wilkin	2:57
3.	"Because He Lives"	Bill Gaither	3:05
4.	"How Do You Treat God"	Gerault	2:10
5.	"Lord I'm Coming Home"	William J. Kirkpatrick	3:03

== Personnel ==
All credits are adapted from the liner notes of Make Me Like a Child Again.

Musical personnel

- Kenny Buttrey – Drums
- Ray Edenton – Guitar
- Wanda Jackson – Lead vocals
- Sherry Kramer – Background vocals
- Weldon Myrick – Steel guitar
- Cindy Reynolds – Harp
- Billy Sanford – Guitar
- Lisa Silver – Background vocals
- Jerry Shook – Guitar
- Jack Williams – Bass
- Bergen White – Background vocals

Technical personnel

- Billy Ray Hearn – Producer
- Brent Maher – Engineering
- Bergen White – Arrangement

== Release history ==
Region	Date	Format	Label	Ref.
Canada; United States	March 1976	Vinyl	Myrrh Records	
Canada; United States	March 1976	Cassette	Myrrh Records	
South Africa	March 1976	Vinyl	Go-Tell Communications; Myrrh Records	
Sweden; United Kingdom	March 1976	Vinyl	Myrrh Records	
