= Now I Have Everything =

Studio album by Wanda Jackson
- Released: March 1975
- Recorded: June 1974
- Studio: Jack Clement Studio
- Genre: Gospel
- Label: Myrrh
- Producer: Billy Ray Hearn

Wanda Jackson chronology
When It's Time to Fall in Love Again (1974)	Now I Have Everything (1975)	Make Me Like a Child Again (1976)

Singles from Now I Have Everything
- 1. "Jesus Put a Yodel in My Soul" Released: 1974

Now I Have Everything is a studio album by American recording artist Wanda Jackson. It was released in March 1975 on Myrrh Records and contained 12 tracks. It was the twenty third studio collection in Jackson's career and her third disc of gospel recordings. The album spawned one single release as well.

== Background ==
Wanda Jackson was first known for a series of Rockabilly and country music recordings during the 1950s and 1960s, some which became commercially-successful. This included 1960's "Let's Have a Party", 1961's "In the Middle of a Heartache" and 1967's "Tears Will Be the Chaser for Your Wine". In 1971, Jackson discovered Christianity, which altered her musical direction during the decade. During this period she left Capitol Records to sign with Myrrh Records where she focused on gospel material.

== Content ==
Among these gospel recordings was Now I Have Everything. Jackson recorded the album alongside producer Billy Ray Hearn. It was her third production assignment with Hearn and was recorded in June 1974 at the Jack Clement Studio. A total of 12 tracks were included on the album. Included were covers of "When the Saints Go Marching In", "Pass Me Not, O Gentle Saviour" and "Oh, How I Love Jesus". Remaining tracks were original songs, including "Jesus Put a Yodel in My Soul" and the self-composed "Let This Be My Attitude".

== Release and singles ==
Now I Have Everything was released in March 1975 on Myrrh Records. It was the twenty third studio release of Jackson's career and her third album on the Myrrh label. The disc was originally issued as a vinyl LP, containing six songs on either side of the record. The album failed to reach any notable charting positions, including the Billboard Top Country Albums survey, which Jackson's albums often made appearances on. She would record several more gospel and country albums for the Word and Myrrh record labels during the 1970s. However, these albums lacked any commercial success. The project included one single, which was "Jesus Put a Yodel in My Soul". The song was released as a seven-inch vinyl single on Myrrh Records in 1974.

== Track listing ==
Side one
No.	Title	Writer(s)	Length
1.	"Don't Ever Let Go of My Hand"	Aaron Brown; Lynda Faye	2:35
2.	"Let This Be My Attitude"	Wanda Jackson	2:59
3.	"Heaven's Gonna Be a Blast"	Nancy Honeytree	2:17
4.	"When the Saints Go Marchin' In"	Traditional	3:45
5.	"Oh, How I Love Jesus"	Traditional	1:48
6.	"Jesus Put a Yodel in My Soul"	Jackson; Esther Pooler	2:05

Side two
No.	Title	Writer(s)	Length
1.	"Now I Have Everything"	David Ingles; Charlie Yandell	2:33
2.	"Pick Me Up, Lord"	Don McHan	2:16
3.	"Jesus, I Love You"	Colbert Croft; Joyce Croft	2:33
4.	"Some Call Him Jesus"	Yvonne DeVaney	2:26
5.	"Let's Just Praise the Lord"	Bill Gaither	2:09
6.	"Pass Me Not, O Gentle Saviour"	Fanny Crosby; William Howard Doane	2:41

== Personnel ==
All credits are adapted from the liner notes of Now I Have Everything.

Musical personnel

- Joseph Babcock – Background vocals
- Jimmy Capps – Guitar
- Ray Edenton – Guitar
- Dolores Edgin – Background vocals
- Russell Hicks – Guitar
- Wanda Jackson – Lead vocals
- Kenny Malone – Drums
- Charlie McCoy – Harmonica
- Weldon Myrick – Steel guitar
- June Page – Background vocals
- Billy Sanford – Guitar
- Jerry Smith – Piano
- Henry Strzelecki – Bass
- Bergen White – Background vocals
- Hurshel Wiginton – Background vocals

Technical personnel

- Billy Ray Hearn – Producer
- Larry Lee – Liner notes
- Stan Miller – Cover design
- Charlie Tallent – Engineer

== Release history ==
Region	Date	Format	Label	Ref.
Canada; United States	March 1975	Vinyl	Myrrh Records	
South Africa	March 1975	Vinyl	Myrrh Records	
United Kingdom	March 1975	Vinyl	Myrrh Records	
