= Jackie Dennis =

Scottish singer (1942–2020)

- Also known as: The Kilted Choirboy; Britain's Ricky Nelson
- Born: John Dennis; 8 October 1942; Leith, Edinburgh, Scotland
- Died: 28 September 2020 (aged 77)
- Occupations: Singer, actor
- Instrument: Vocals
- Years active: 1958–1966
- Label: Decca

John Dennis (8 October 1942 – 28 September 2020) was a Scottish singer who enjoyed success in Britain in the 1950s.

== Early life ==
Born John Dennis, he was discovered by the comedians Mike and Bernie Winters when he was performing at the United States Army Air Forces base at Prestwick in 1958. The brothers brought him to the attention of the show business agent Eve Taylor, and he appeared on the television programme, Six-Five Special, at the age of 15, and in a subsequent film spin-off.

== Career ==
Dennis, a kilt-wearing, spiky-haired pop singer, enjoyed seven successful years in the show business and toured the world. "La Dee Dah" was his biggest UK hit, reaching number 4 in the UK Singles Chart in 1958, whilst his cover of Sheb Wooley's "Purple People Eater", was his second and final UK hit, peaking at number 29.

Dennis appeared on Perry Como's US television show, where he was introduced as 'Britain's Ricky Nelson' performing the song "Linton Addie", and Dennis was best man at entertainer Tommy Steele's wedding.

After leaving show business, Dennis joined the civil service, where he worked for over a decade as a messenger with the Manpower Services Commission in Edinburgh. Latterly, Dennis worked as a nursing home carer.

== Personal life and death ==
In retirement, Dennis lived in Pilton, Edinburgh, with wife Irene (née Darling), whom he married in 1983.

He died in September 2020, at the age of 77.

== Discography ==
=== Singles ===
- "La Dee Dah" / "You're the Greatest" (1958) (Decca F 10992)
- "Miss Valerie" / "My Dream" (1958) (Decca F 11011)
- "The Purple People Eater" / "You-oo" (1958) (Decca F 11033)
- "More Than Ever" / "Linton Addie" (1958) (Decca F 11060)
- "Lucky Ladybug" / "Gingerbread" (1958) (Decca F 11090)
- "The Wee Cooper O' Fife" / "Come Along" (1959) (Decca F 11120)
- "Summer Snow" / "Night Bird" (1959) (Top Rank JAR 129)
