= When It's Time to Fall in Love Again =

Studio album by Wanda Jackson
- Released: 1974
- Recorded: April 1973
- Studio: Jack Clement Studio
- Genre: Country
- Label: Myrrh
- Producer: Billy Ray Hearn

Wanda Jackson chronology
Country Keepsakes (1973)	When It's Time to Fall in Love Again (1974)	Now I Have Everything (1975)

Singles from When It's Time to Fall in Love Again
- 1. "When It's Time to Fall in Love Again" Released: September 1973; 2. "Come on Home (To This Lonely Heart)" Released: December 1974

When It's Time to Fall in Love Again is a studio album by American recording artist Wanda Jackson. It was released in 1974 via Myrrh Records and contained ten tracks. It was the first collection of country music recordings released following Jackson's departure from Capitol Records in 1973 and was her twenty-second album in her career. The project included two singles. The second single, "Come on Home (To This Lonely Heart)", made chart positions on the American country songs survey in 1974.

== Background and content ==
Wanda Jackson had previously been known for her commercially successful Rockabilly and country music recordings, including "Let's Have a Party" (1960), "In the Middle of a Heartache" (1961) and "Tears Will Be the Chaser for Your Wine" (1967). After discovering Christianity in 1971, she left her long-time label home (Capitol Records) to pursue religious music. In 1973, she made her first recordings for Word Records. Shortly after her signing, Word announced its label subsidiary titled Myrrh Records. According to Jackson's autobiography, it was agreed that Word would release her religious material, while Myrrh would release her country material. This agreement led to recordings that would comprise When It's Time to Fall in Love Again.

Jackson went into the Jack Clement Studio in April 1973 with producer Billy Ray Hearn to record the album's tracks. A total of ten recordings were chosen for the album. The record was a collection of country songs that mixed originals with covers of previously recorded songs. The title track and "Come on Home (To This Lonely Heart)" were among the project's original songs. Meanwhile, Donna Fargo's "Funny Face", Jean Shepard's "Slippin' Away" and Anne Murray's "Snowbird" were covers.

== Release and singles ==
When It's Time to Fall in Love Again was released in 1974 on Myrrh Records. The album was Jackson's twenty second studio release in her career and her first country album following her Capitol Records departure. The album was originally issued as a vinyl LP, containing five songs on either side of the record. Two singles were issued from the record. The first to be released was the title track, which Myrrh distributed to radio stations in September 1973. This was followed by "Come on Home (To This Lonely Heart)", which was released on Myrrh in December 1973. The song spent a total of four weeks on the Billboard Hot Country Singles chart, peaking at number 98 in February 1974. "Come on Home" is Jackson's last Billboard charting single to date.

== Track listing ==
Side one
No.	Title	Writer(s)	Length
1.	"Come on Home (To This Lonely Heart)"	Joyce Croft	2:58
2.	"Everybody's Had the Blues"	Merle Haggard	2:58
3.	"Snowbird"	Gene MacLellan	2:21
4.	"It's a Long, Long Time to Cry"	Thelma Blackmon	2:43
5.	"Slippin' Away"	Bill Anderson	2:33

Side two
No.	Title	Writer(s)	Length
1.	"When It's Time to Fall in Love Again"	Barney Sudderth	2:08
2.	"Say I Do"	Ray Hildebrand	2:35
3.	"Funny Face"	Donna Fargo	2:57
4.	"Put Your Hand in the Hand"	MacLellan	2:18
5.	"Thank Heaven for Sending Me You"	Yvonne DeVaney	2:17

== Personnel ==
All credits are adapted from the liner notes of When It's Time to Fall in Love Again.

Musical personnel

- Joseph Babcock – Background vocals
- Jerry Carrigan – Drums
- Ray Edenton – Guitar
- Dolores Edgin – Background vocals
- Wanda Jackson – Lead vocals
- Weldon Myrick – Steel guitar
- June Page – Background vocals
- Billy Sanford – Guitar
- Jerry Shook – Guitar
- Jerry Smith – Piano
- Hurshel Wiginton – Background vocals
- Jack Williams – Guitar

Technical personnel

- Dick Cobb – Photography
- Billy Ray Hearn – Producer
- Farrell Morris – Percussion
- Charlie Tallent – Engineer

== Release history ==
Region	Date	Format	Label	Ref.
Canada; United States	1974	Vinyl	Myrrh Records	
Sweden; United Kingdom	1974	Vinyl	Myrrh Records	
