= Welcome to Trini Country =

Studio album by Trini Lopez
- Released: 1968
- Genre: Country
- Label: Reprise
- Producer: Snuff Garrett

Trini Lopez chronology
It's A Great Life (1968)	Welcome to Trini Country (1968)	The Love Album (1978)

Professional ratings
Review scores
Source	Rating
Allmusic	4/5 stars

Welcome to Trini Country is a country music album by guitarist and singer Trini Lopez, released in 1968 by Reprise Records (RS 6300).

== Track listing ==
1. "Gentle on My Mind" (John Hartford) - (2:32)
2. "Crazy Arms" (Charles Seals, Ralph Mooney) - (2:20)
3. "Devil Woman" (M.D. Robinson) - (3:25)
4. "Once a Day" (Bill Anderson) - (2:00)
5. "Green, Green Grass of Home" (Curly Putman) - (3:10)
6. "Good Old Mountain Dew" (Jack Clement, T. L. Garrett, Trini Lopez) - (2:02)
7. "Flowers on the Wall" (Lewis DeWitt) - (2:14)
8. "If The Whole World Stopped Lovin'" (Ben Peters) - (2:30)
9. "Lonely Weekends" (Charlie Rich) - (2:14)
10. "Four Strong Winds" (Ian Tyson) - (2:27)
11. "Shanghied" (Mel Tillis) - (2:09)
12. "Mental Journey" (Leon Ashley, Margie Singleton) - (1:57)

== Production ==
- Recorded at Columbia Studios, Nashville, Tennessee.
- Arranged by Don Tweedy

=== Other Contributors ===
- vocal accompaniment by The Jordanaires
