= Purple People Eater (film) =

1988 film by Linda Shayne

- Theatrical release poster
- Directed by: Linda Shayne
- Written by: Linda Shayne
- Based on: "Purple People Eater" by Sheb Wooley
- Produced by: Brad Krevoy; Steven Stabler
- Starring: Ned Beatty; Shelley Winters; Neil Patrick Harris; Little Richard; Chubby Checker; Peggy Lipton
- Cinematography: Peter Deming
- Edited by: Cari Coughlin
- Music by: Dennis Dreith
- Distributed by: Motion Picture Corporation of America
- Release date: December 16, 1988
- Running time: 90 minutes
- Country: United States
- Language: English
- Budget: $3 million

Purple People Eater is a 1988 American science fiction comedy film based on Sheb Wooley's 1958 novelty song of the same name, written and directed by Linda Shayne, and starring Neil Patrick Harris, Ned Beatty, Shelley Winters, Dustin Diamond, Peggy Lipton, and Thora Birch in her film debut. Chubby Checker and Little Richard made musical guest appearances. The film was released on December 16, 1988.

== Plot ==
In the town of Sunny Hills, 12-year-old Billy Johnson learns that his grandfather Sam is supposed to watch him and his little sister Molly, while his parents are on an extended business trip in Europe. That night, Billy starts playing the novelty song, and a one-eyed, one-horned flying purple alien from outer space appears and lands on a nearby tree. When Billy whistles, the creature jumps down from the tree and befriends him, naming the alien “Purple”. The next day, Billy and Sam see Purple at the mall, Sam is amazed and encourages Billy that he and Purple should form a rock and roll band together. Purple explains to Billy that he knows only classic hits because it takes twenty five years for radio waves to go from Earth to his home planet. Meanwhile, Billy tells one of his friends, Allison, who promises to keep a secret that Purple is an alien, but is overheard by Donna, Billy’s nosy next-door neighbor.

The next day, a greedy landlord named Ken Noodle, who owns the elderly housing, forces Sam and his neighbor Rita to pay the rent for eviction, but Rita cannot let that happen. Later, Sam gets a phone call when he signs a record deal for inquiring about a band, but his excitement abates when he gets another phone call and tells that Rita is sick. He and Billy head over to Rita’s home, and explains to Sam that she lived in her house for years and was afraid of losing her home. They introduce her to Purple and they grow closer to each other. That night, Rita celebrates her birthday with her family, but Noodle shows up and ruthlessly gives her an eviction notice, causing her to pass out. An ambulance arrives to take Rita to the hospital, leaving the family despondent.

The next day, Billy and Sam visit Rita at the hospital alive and well. Billy and Purple plan to put up a benefit concert to save the homes of senior citizens on Labor Day. Frustrated by the idea, Noodle attempts to kidnap Purple to prevent him from attending the concert. The next day, Billy notices that Purple is missing. Meanwhile, Purple manages to escape from Noodle in a road chase. Right before the concert begins, Purple makes it on time and starts performing “The Purple People Eater”. As the song ends, Purple waves goodbye to Billy and flies away back home to his planet.

== Cast ==
- Neil Patrick Harris as William "Billy" Johnson
- Ned Beatty as Sam Johnson
- Shelley Winters as Rita
- Thora Birch as Molly Johnson
- Dustin Diamond as Big Z
- Peggy Lipton as Mrs. Johnson
- James Houghton as Mr. Johnson
- John Brumfield as Ken Noodle
- Molly Cheek as Mrs. Orfus
- Kimberly McCullough as Donna Orfus
- Shonda Whipple as Allison
- Lindsay Price as Kory Kamimoto
- Little Richard as The Mayor
- Chubby Checker as himself
- Sheb Wooley as Harry Skinner
- Linda Shayne as Nurse
- Tim Lawrence as Purple / Man in Chicken Suit

== Production ==
Linda Shayne first got the idea of doing a film adaptation of Sheb Wooley's 1958 novelty song The Purple People Eater while working with Jim Wynorski on Screwballs with Wynorski remarking the song would make a good movie. While Shayne was able to secure the option for the song relatively easily from Wooley, acquiring financing took several years. The titular Purple People Eater was designed by the Chiodo Brothers with Shayne stating she wanted it to look like a mixture of a Muppet, Cousin Itt, and a shaggy dog.

== Release ==
The film premiered in the United States on December 16, 1988.
