= Trini Lopez at PJ's =

Live album by Trini Lopez
- Released: 1963
- Venue: PJ's in West Hollywood, California
- Genres: Pop, folk
- Label: Reprise
- Producer: Don Costa

Trini Lopez chronology
Trini Lopez at PJ's (1963)	More Trini Lopez at PJ's (1963)

Professional ratings
Review scores
Source	Rating
New Record Mirror	5/5 stars

Trini Lopez at PJ's is the first live album by singer and guitarist Trini Lopez, released in 1963 on Reprise Records. Many of the tracks are folk music songs. The record was a result of Don Costa hearing him perform at PJ's nightclub, and signing him to his new Reprise record label. The club floor was miked to get the crowd reaction on the record, as the producer and Frank Sinatra wanted the "live" experience to come across in the recording. The cover shows Lopez with his Barney Kessel guitar, outside the nightclub. The album peaked at No. 2 on the Billboard 200 in August 1963 where it remained for six weeks.

== Singles ==
The album includes a cover of "If I Had a Hammer", which reached number 1 in thirty-six countries (number 3 in the United States). It sold over one million copies, and was awarded a Gold disc. Also included on the album is a version of the traditional Mexican song "La Bamba". This version was later re-issued as a single in 1966.

== Track listing ==
=== Side one ===
1. "A-me-ri-ca"
2. "If I Had a Hammer"
3. "Bye Bye Blackbird"
4. "Cielito Lindo"
5. "This Land Is Your Land"
6. "What'd I Say"

=== Side two ===
1. "La Bamba"
2. "Granada"
3. "Gotta Travel On" - (Billy Grammer) (medley, tracks 3–7)
4. "Down by the Riverside"
5. "Marianne"
6. "When the Saints Go Marching In"
7. "Volare"
8. "Unchain My Heart"

== Musicians ==
- Lopez - guitar, vocals
- Mickey Jones - drums
- Dick Brant - bass guitar (credited on the album, reportedly cut from the final recording)

== Production ==
- Recorded at PJ's nightclub, West Hollywood, California

== Other contributors ==
- Liner notes by Mike Connolly of The Hollywood Reporter
- Cover photo - Marko
