= Thank You for Calling =

Single by Jo Stafford
- B-side: "Where Are You?"
- Released: 1954
- Genre: Traditional pop
- Length: 2:32
- Label: Columbia
- Songwriter: Cindy Walker

"Thank You for Calling" is a traditional pop and country song.

It was written by Cindy Walker. The song was published in 1954.

The song was recorded by Billy Walker, Jo Stafford, Hank Snow, and Timi Yuro.

Stafford's version was the most popular. It was recorded on April 29, 1954. The recording was released by Columbia Records as catalog number 40250. The record first reached the Billboard magazine charts on June 9, 1954 and lasted 8 weeks on the chart, peaking at #19.
