= Linda Shayne =

Screenwriter and director of film and TV

- Born: United States
- Education: University of California, Berkeley and the American Academy of Dramatic Arts
- Occupations: Film director, screenwriter, actress, producer

Linda Shayne is an American-Canadian film and television writer and director, and former actress.

== Early life ==
Shayne was born in the United States. She graduated from the University of California at Berkeley and her published work includes a journal article about ex-offenders from San Quentin Prison. She also attended the American Academy of Dramatic Arts.

== Career ==
Shayne's feature film credits include Purple People Eater (writer, director, and producer), Flyin' Ryan (writer, director, and producer), Crystal Heart (writer), Little Ghost (director), and The Undercover Kid (director). Shayne wrote and directed the short suspense thriller Mirror Image (director) in 2019. Linda Shayne's TV credits include The Secret World of Alex Mack (director), and Starla and the Jewel Riders (writer).

For her film, Mirror Image, she won Best Directing at the Freedom Festival Intl. and Best Thriller at the Hollywood Reel Independent Film Festival.

Shayne's dramatic epic screenplay won Best Script at the New Renaissance Film Festival, the Florence Film Awards and Top 10 at Cinequest.

Shayne's other film credits include Out of Bounds (actress), No Man's Land (actress), Graduation Day (actress), Humanoids from the Deep (actress), Screwballs (writer and actress), and Lovely But Deadly (actress). Linda Shayne's TV credits include Archie Bunker's Place (actress), Hill Street Blues (actress), The Tonight Show Starring Johnny Carson (actress), The Secret World of Alex Mack (director), and Starla and the Jewel Riders (writer).

Shayne was the writer and director of the documentary Being Anne: Conversation Of Transformation. She won the Best Narrative Documentary award at the Angeles Documentaries Film Festival in 2024.

Shayne has also had film writing development deals with Walt Disney Studios, Showtime Networks, and Brian Grazer, and she has served on the judging panel for the British film festival ShropFilm48. Linda Shayne created a TV series to film in Thailand and served as a Judge for the Content Asia Awards.

Linda Shayne wrote the children's book, Longfellow Finds a Home. The book was illustrated by Emmy-Award winner Art Leonardo. The bilingual English/Japanese version will be released soon. Shayne co-wrote the English translation of Dord Kristin's non-fiction book Mileva and Albert Einstein: Their Love and Scientific Collaboration, sold at the Einstein Museum House in Switzerland.
