= Capitol Christian Music Group =

American music group with unofficial branches in Canada

- Parent company: EMI (1992–2012); Universal Music Group (2012–present)
- Founded: February 1976; 50 years ago
- Founder: Billy Ray Hearn
- Distributors: Interscope Capitol Labels Group (in North America); EMI Records (in the United Kingdom)
- Genre: Christian music, contemporary Christian music, Christian rock, gospel
- Country of origin: United States
- Location: Nashville, Tennessee, U.S.
- Official website: capitolchristianmusicgroup.com

Capitol Christian Music Group (Capitol CMG) (formerly known as EMI Christian Music Group) is an American record label that, since 2013, is under the ownership of Universal Music Group. Based in Nashville, Tennessee, the label is in the Christian and gospel music industries.

== History ==
The music group was founded by Billy Ray Hearn in February 1976 as Sparrow Records. Sparrow was acquired by EMI in 1992. Formerly known as EMI Christian Music Group, Capitol CMG is a division of Capitol Music Group, which is now a Universal Music Group company.

As of 2024, Capitol CMG operates under Universal Music Group-owned Interscope Capitol Labels Group (ICLG).

== Labels ==
- Capitol Christian Distribution (formerly EMI CMG Distribution)
  - Gaither Music Group
  - Bethel Music
- Capitol CMG Group (formerly EMI CMG Group)
  - Credential Recordings
  - ForeFront Records
  - Tamla Records
  - Motown Gospel
  - Sparrow Records
  - Worship Together
  - Bethel Music
  - Curiel Music
  - Re:Think
- Capitol CMG Publishing
  - Brentwood-Benson
  - Meadowgreen Music
- sixstepsrecords (distribution)
- Bethel Music (distribution)
- BEC Recordings Canada
  - Covenant Recording Company (50%, with eclair's block Music Group)

== See also ==
- Christian record labels
- EMI
- List of record labels
