= Adios Amigo (song) =

Single by Jim Reeves

from the album The Best of Jim Reeves
- B-side: "A Letter to My Heart"
- Released: 1962
- Recorded: 1962
- Genre: Country
- Length: 2:20
- Label: RCA
- Songwriter(s): Ralph Freed, Jerry Livingston
- Producer(s): Chet Atkins

Jim Reeves singles chronology
"A Letter to My Heart" (1962)	"Adios Amigo" (1962)	"I'm Gonna Change Everything" (1962)

"Adios Amigo" is a song written by Ralph Freed and Jerry Livingston, performed by Jim Reeves, and released on the RCA label (catalog no. 45-RCA-1293). It debuted on the Billboard country and western charts in May 1962, spent nine weeks at the No. 2 spot, and remained on the charts for a total of 21 weeks. It was also ranked No. 5 on Billboard's 1962 year-end country and western chart. In Canada the song reached No. 15 on the CHUM Charts.

== See also ==
- Billboard Top Country & Western Records of 1962
