= Trini Lopez =

American singer and guitarist (1937–2020)

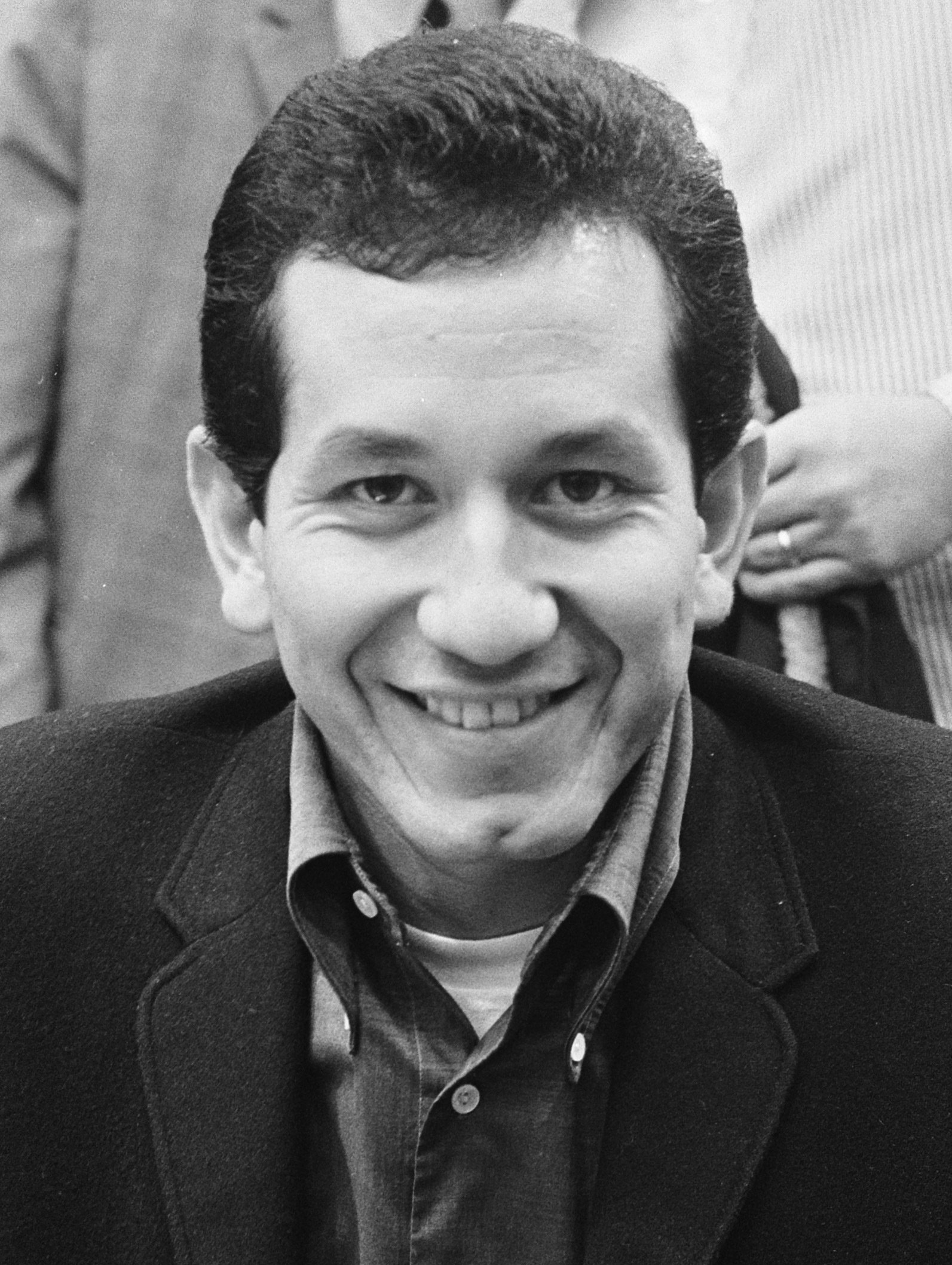
- Lopez in 1963

Background information
- Born: Trinidad López III; May 15, 1937; Dallas, Texas, U.S.
- Died: August 11, 2020 (aged 83) Palm Springs, California, U.S.
- Occupations: Singer; musician
- Instruments: Vocals; guitar
- Years active: 1959–2020
- Labels: Reprise; Columbia; King; Crown
- Website: trinilopez.com

Trinidad López III (May 15, 1937 – August 11, 2020), known as Trini Lopez, was an American singer and guitarist. His first album included a cover version of Pete Seeger's "If I Had a Hammer", which earned a gold disc for him. His other hits included "Lemon Tree", "I'm Comin' Home, Cindy" and "Sally Was a Good Old Girl". He designed two guitars for the Gibson Guitar Corporation, which are now collector's items. A documentary on his life and career, My Name Is Lopez, was released in April 2022.

== Early life ==
Lopez was born in Dallas, Texas, on May 15, 1937, to Trinidad López II, who worked as a singer, dancer, actor, and musician in Mexico, and Petra González. Lopez was of Mexican descent, his parents married in their hometown of Moroleón, Guanajuato, prior to moving to Dallas. Lopez had four sisters (two are deceased) and a brother, Jesse, who is also a singer. He grew up on Ashland Street in the Little Mexico neighborhood of Dallas and attended grammar school and N. R. Crozier Tech High School. He dropped out of high school in his senior year in order to earn money to help support the family.

== Career ==
Lopez formed his first band in Wichita Falls, Texas, at the age of 15. Around 1955/56, Lopez and his band worked at The Vegas Club, a nightclub owned by Jack Ruby, the man who would later assassinate Lee Harvey Oswald. In 1957, at the recommendation of Buddy Holly's father, Trini and his group "The Big Beats" went to producer Norman Petty in Clovis, New Mexico. Petty secured a contract for them with Columbia Records, which released the single "Clark's Expedition"/"Big Boy", both instrumental. Lopez left the group and made his first solo recording, his own composition "The Right To Rock", for the Dallas-based Volk Records, and then signed with King Records in 1959, recording more than a dozen singles for that label, none of which reached any musical hit parade.

In late 1962, after the King contract expired, Lopez followed up on an offer by producer Snuff Garrett to join the post-Holly Crickets as vocalist. After a few weeks of auditions in Los Angeles, that idea did not go through. He landed a steady engagement at the nightclub PJ's, where his audience grew quickly. He was heard there by Frank Sinatra, who had started his own label, Reprise Records, and who subsequently signed Lopez.

His debut live album, Trini Lopez at PJ's (R/RS 6093), was released in 1963. The album included a version of Pete Seeger's "If I Had a Hammer", which reached No. 1 in 36 countries (No. 3 in the United States), and was a radio favorite for many years. It sold over one million copies and was awarded a gold disc. He also performed his own version of the traditional Mexican song "La Bamba" on the album; his recording of the tune was later reissued as a single in 1966. Another live album from PJ's was recorded later that same year under the title By Popular Demand More Trini Lopez at PJ's (R/RS 6103), which contains the song Green, Green which was written by Randy Sparks and Barry McGuire and originally recorded by the New Christy Minstrels earlier that year for their Columbia album Ramblin.

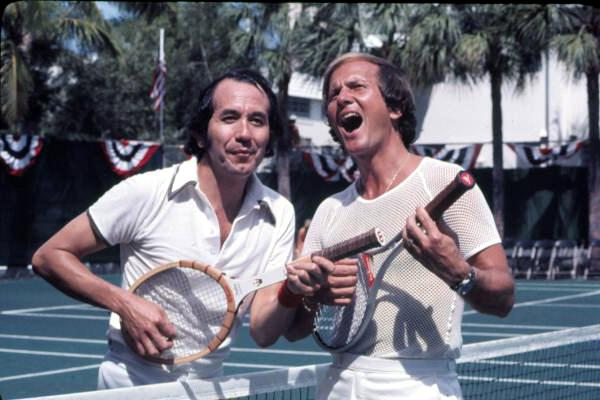
Trini Lopez and Pat Boone during a tennis event at Fort Lauderdale, Florida (April 1975)

Lopez scored 13 chart singles through 1968, including "Lemon Tree" (1965), "I'm Comin' Home, Cindy" (1966), and "Sally Was a Good Old Girl" (1968). Later in 2013, Lopez told Portland Magazine, "People ask about 'Lemon Tree' all the time. It's one of my most favorite requested songs. It's a very catchy tune. I just happen to like the chorus." On the adult contemporary chart, he racked up 15 hits, including the top-10 singles "Michael" (1964), "Gonna Get Along Without Ya' Now" (1967), and "The Bramble Bush" (1967), which he sang in the movie The Dirty Dozen. Beyond his success on record, he became one of the country's top nightclub performers of that era, regularly headlining in Las Vegas. In 1968, he recorded an album in Nashville entitled Welcome to Trini Country (R/RS 6300).

Lopez produced a single promoting the Coca-Cola Company's soft drink Fresca in 1967. In 1969, NBC aired a Trini Lopez variety special featuring the outstanding instrumental group the Ventures and singer Nancy Ames as guests. Its soundtrack, released as The Trini Lopez Show, has him singing his hits with the Ventures as his backing band.

He continued his musical career with extensive tours of Europe and Latin America during this period; an attempt to break out further by releasing a disco album in 1978 proved unsuccessful.

In 2002, Lopez teamed with Art Greenhaw for Legacy: My Texas Roots. The album used the "Texas Roots Combo" including Lopez, Greenhaw, and Lopez's brother, Jesse. Said reviewer Steve Leggett of AllMusic, "The album has an easygoing feel very similar to Lopez's classic live sets from the 1960s, only it rocks a good deal harder." Thereafter, Lopez focused on charitable work.

Lopez was still recording and appearing live in the years leading up to his death. He took part in a benefit concert to raise money for the victims of the 2004 Indian Ocean earthquake and tsunami, and appeared as a guest performer in a number of shows held in Maastricht in the Netherlands with the Dutch violinist and composer André Rieu. He continued to record; El Inmortal was released in 2010, and the following year he released his 65th album, Into The Future.

== Gibson Guitars ==
Lopez' popularity led the Gibson Guitar Corporation to ask him in 1964 to design a guitar for them. He ended up designing two: the Trini Lopez Standard, a rock and roll model based on the Gibson ES-335 semihollow body, and the Lopez Deluxe, a variation of a Gibson jazz guitar designed by Barney Kessel. Both of these guitars were in production from 1964 until 1971, and are now highly sought-after among collectors. Owners of the guitar include Dave Grohl of Foo Fighters and Noel Gallagher of Oasis.

== Acting career ==
During the 1960s and 1970s, Lopez moved into acting, though his film career was not as successful as his music. Lopez's first film role was in Marriage on the Rocks (1965), in which he made a cameo appearance in a nightclub scene; Lopez's soundtrack song, "Sinner Man", became a hit single (No. 54 pop/No. 12 adult contemporary). He was one of The Dirty Dozen (1967), appeared as himself in The Phynx (1970), and played the title role in Claudio Guzman's Antonio (1973). He made two appearances (playing different characters) on the television program Adam-12. In 1977, he played the role of Julio Ramirez in "The Mystery of the Silent Scream", an episode of The Hardy Boys/Nancy Drew Mysteries TV series.

== Honors, awards, distinctions ==
- In 1993, a Golden Palm Star on the Palm Springs, California, Walk of Stars was dedicated to Lopez.
- He was inducted into the International Latin Music Hall of Fame in 2003.
- On May 15, 2008, his 71st birthday, Lopez was inducted into the Las Vegas Walk of Stars.

== Personal life and death ==
Lopez remained a lifelong bachelor and had no children. His nephew, Trini Martinez, was the drummer for the Dallas indie rock band Bedhead.

Lopez died on August 11, 2020, at Desert Regional Medical Center in Palm Springs, California. He was 83 and developed complications from COVID-19 amidst the COVID-19 pandemic in California.

== Discography ==
=== Singles ===
Year	Single (A-side, B-side) Both sides from same album except where indicated	Chart positions						Album
Year	Single (A-side, B-side) Both sides from same album except where indicated	US	CB	US AC	UK	US R&B	CAN	Album
1958	"The Right to Rock" b/w "Just Once More"	—	—	—	—	—	—	Teenage Love Songs
1959	"Rock On" b/w "It Hurts to Be in Love" (from Teenage Love Songs)	—	—	—	—	—	—	Non-album tracks
1959	"Yes You Do" b/w "My Runaway Heart" (from Teenage Love Songs)	—	—	—	—	—	—	Non-album tracks
1959	"Rock On" b/w "Since I Don't Have You"	—	—	—	—	—	—	Non-album tracks
1959	"Love Me Tonight" b/w "Here Comes Sally" (Non-album track)	—	—	—	—	—	—	Teenage Love Songs
1959	"I'm Grateful" b/w "Don't Let Your Sweet Love Die" (Non-album track)	—	—	—	—	—	—	Teenage Love Songs
1959	"(Won't You Be) My Queen for a Day" b/w "Yes You Do"	—	—	—	—	—	—	Non-album tracks
1959	"Nobody Loves Me" bw "Nobody Listens to Our Teenage Problems" (from Teenage Love Songs)	—	—	—	—	—	—	Non-album tracks
1960	"Jeanie Marie" b/w "Schemer"	—	—	—	—	—	—	Teenage Love Songs
1960	"The Search Goes On" b/w "It Hurts to Be in Love" (from Teenage Love Songs)	—	—	—	—	—	—	Non-album track
1960	"Then You Know (You've Been in Love)" b/w "Don't Treat Me That Way" (Non-album track)	—	—	—	—	—	—	Teenage Love Songs
1961	"You Broke the Only Heart" b/w "One Heart, One Life, One Love"	—	—	—	—	—	—	Teenage Love Songs
1961	"Rosita" b/w "Only in My Dreams"	—	—	—	—	—	—	Trini Lopez & Johnny Tores
1962	"Sinner Not a Saint" b/w "Where Can My Baby Be"	—	—	—	—	—	—	Trini Lopez & Johnny Tores
1963	"Jeanie Marie" b/w "Love Me Tonight"	—	—	—	—	—	—	Teenage Love Songs
1963	"Don't Go" b/w "It Seems"	—	—	—	—	—	—	Non-album tracks
1963	"A-Me-Ri-Ca" b/w "Let It Be Known"	—	—	—	—	—	—	Non-album tracks
1963	"La Bamba" (Part I) b/w "La Bamba" (Part II) (Non-album track)	—	123	—	—	—	—	
1963	"If I Had a Hammer" b/w "Unchain My Heart"	3	3	—	4	12	—	Trini Lopez at PJ's
1963	"Kansas City"	23	26	13	35	—	—	By Popular Demand!! More Trini Lopez at PJ's
1963	"Lonesome Traveler"	—	135	—	—	—	—	By Popular Demand!! More Trini Lopez at PJ's
1963	"La Bamba" b/w "Granada"	—	—	—	—	—	—	Trini Lopez at PJ's
1963	"Nobody Loves Me" b/w "The Club for Broken Hearts" (from Teenage Love Songs)	—	—	—	—	—	—	Non-album track
1964	"Sinner Not a Saint" b/w "If"	103	—	—	—	—	—	Trini Lopez & Johnny Tores
1964	"Jailer, Bring Me Water" b/w "You Can't Say Goodbye"	94	106	—	—	—	—	On the Move
1964	"What Have I Got of My Own" b/w "Ya Ya"	43	51	—	—	—	—	On the Move
1964	"Michael" b/w "San Francisco De Assisi" (from The Second Latin Album)	42	41	7	—	—	—	The Folk Album
1965	"Lemon Tree" b/w "Pretty Eyes"	20	22	2	—	—	—	The Folk Album
1965	"Sad Tomorrows" b/w "I've Lost My Love for You" (Non-album track)	94	81	22	—	—	—	The Love Album
1965	"Are You Sincere" b/w "You'll Be Sorry"	85	110	25	—	—	20	The Love Album
1965	"Sinner Man" b/w "Double Trouble" (from The Rhythm & Blues Album)	54	64	12	—	—	—	Trini Lopez Plays and Sings
1965	"Regresa A Mi" b/w "Mi Felicidad"	—	—	—	—	—	—	Non-album tracks
1966	"Made in Paris" b/w "Pretty Little Girl"	113	113	36	—	—	—	Non-album tracks
1966	"The Search Goes On" b/w "Chain of Love" (from Teenage Love Songs)	—	—	—	—	—	—	Non-album tracks
1966	"I'm Comin' Home, Cindy" b/w "The 32nd of May"	39	48	2	28	—	23	Trini
1966	"La Bamba Pt. 1" b/w "Trini's Tune" (from Trini)	86	100	9	—	—	78	Greatest Hits
1966	"Pancho Lopez" b/w "Hall of Fame" (from Greatest Hits)	—	—	—	—	—	—	The Second Latin Album
1966	"Takin' the Back Roads" /	—	tag	—	—	—	—	Trini Lopez in London
1966	"Your Ever Changin' Mind"	—	131	—	—	—	—	Trini Lopez in London
1967	"Gonna Get Along Without Ya Now" b/w "Love Letters"	93	93	6	41	—	—	Trini Lopez in London
1967	"Up to Now" b/w "In the Land of Plenty" (from Trini Lopez – Now!)	123	—	—	—	—	—	Non-album tracks
1967	"The Bramble Bush" b/w "The Ballad of the Dirty Dozen"	—	117	4	—	—	—	Non-album tracks
1967	"Together" b/w "I Wanna Be Free" (from Trini Lopez – Now!)	—	—	30	—	—	—	Non-album tracks
1967	"It's a Great Life" b/w "Let's Take A Walk"	—	—	—	—	—	—	It's a Great Life
1968	"Sally Was a Good Old Girl" b/w "It's a Great Life"	99	106	30	—	—	—	It's a Great Life
1968	"Mental Journey" b/w "Good Old Mountain Dew"	—	—	18	—	—	—	Welcome to Trini Country
1968	"Malagueña Salerosa" b/w "Something Tells Me"	—	—	24	—	—	—	Non-album tracks
1968	"El Nino Del Tambor (The Little Drummer Boy)" b/w "Noche De Paz (Silent Night adaption) / Let There Be Peace"	—	—	—	—	—	—	Non-album tracks
1969	"Come a Little Bit Closer" b/w "Pata Cum Cum" (first pressings) "My Baby Loves Sad Songs" (later pressings)	121	—	—	—	—	—	The Whole Enchilada
1969	"Don't Let the Sun Catch You Crying" b/w "My Baby Loves Sad Songs"	133	—	—	—	—	—	The Whole Enchilada
1969	"Love Story" b/w "Games People Play"	—	—	—	—	—	—	Non-album tracks
1970	"Five O'Clock World" b/w "You Make My Day"	—	—	—	—	—	—	Non-album tracks
1970	"Mexican Medicine Man" b/w "Time to Get It Together"	—	—	—	—	—	—	Non-album tracks
1970	"Mexican Medicine Man" b/w "Su-Kal-De-Don"	—	—	—	—	—	—	Non-album tracks
1970	"Let's Think About Living" b/w "There Was a Crooked Man"	—	—	—	—	—	—	Non-album tracks
1971	"Some Kind of Summer" b/w "Poor Old Billy"	—	—	—	—	—	—	Non-album tracks
1972	"Ruby Mountain" b/w "Y Volvere"	—	—	—	—	—	—	Viva
1973	"Butterfly" b/w "Don't Burn Your Bridges Behind You"	—	—	—	—	—	—	Non-album tracks
1975	"We Gotta Make It Together" b/w "Bring Back the Sunshine"	—	—	—	—	—	—	Non-album tracks
1975	"Somethin' 'Bout You Baby I Like" b/w "Sweet Life"	—	76	—	—	—	—	Non-album tracks
1977	"Sha-La-Boom-Boom-Yeah" b/w "Satisfaction"	—	—	—	—	—	—	Non-album tracks
1977	"You Say Something Nice" b/w "Sittin' Pretty in Atlantic City"	—	—	—	—	—	—	Non-album tracks
1977	"Helplessly" b/w "Beautiful People"	—	—	—	—	—	—	Transformed by Time
1978	"Helplessly" b/w "Trini's Medley"	—	—	—	—	—	—	Transformed by Time

=== Albums ===
Most albums are on the Reprise label, unless otherwise indicated.

- 1963 Trini Lopez at PJ's (No. 2 Billboard 200)
- 1963 More Trini Lopez at PJ's (No. 11 Billboard 200)
- 1964 On the Move (No. 32 Billboard 200)
- 1964 Live at Basin St. East (No. 30 Billboard 200)
- 1964 Trini Lopez Plays and Sings
- 1964 The Latin Album (No. 18 Billboard 200)
- 1965 The Folk Album (No. 18 Billboard 200)
- 1965 The Love Album (No. 32 Billboard 200)
- 1965 The Rhythm and Blues Album (No. 46 Billboard 200)
- 1965 The Sing Along World of Trini Lopez (No. 101 Billboard 200)
- 1965 Trini Lopez Live in South Africa
- 1966 Trini (No. 54 Billboard 200)
- 1966 The Second Latin Album (No. 110 Billboard 200)
- 1966 Greatest Hits (No. 47 Billboard 200)
- 1967 Trini Lopez In London (No. 114 Billboard 200)
- 1967 Now! (No. 162 Billboard 200)
- 1968 It's a Great Life
- 1968 Welcome to Trini Country
- 1969 The Whole Enchilada
- 1969 The Trini Lopez Show
- 1971 Trini Lopez Live in Tokyo
- 1972 Viva
- 1977 Y Su Alma Latina
- 1978 Transformed By Time
- 1991 The 25th Anniversary Album
- 1998 Dance Party
- 2000 Aylole-Aylola
- 2001 Dance the Night Away
- 2002 Legacy: My Texas Roots
- 2005 Romantic and Sexy Guitars
- 2008 Ramblin' Man
- 2011 Into the Future, Trilo Records

== Filmography ==
Film
Year	Title	Role	Notes
1965	Marriage on the Rocks	Himself	
1966	The Poppy Is Also a Flower	Himself	
1967	The Dirty Dozen	Pedro Jiminez	
1970	The Phynx	Himself	
1971	The Reluctant Heroes	Pvt. Sam Rivera	ABC Movie of the Week
1973	Antonio	Antonio Contreras	
1995	Prima Donnas	Himself	

== Use of music ==
- His recording of "Cielito Lindo" was used in the 1989 film Born on the Fourth of July.
