= The Purple People Eater =

1958 single by Sheb Wooley

Single by Sheb Wooley
- B-side: "I Can't Believe You're Mine"
- Released: May 1958
- Genre: Rock and roll; comedy; doo-wop; novelty
- Length: 2:11
- Label: MGM
- Songwriter: Sheb Wooley

Sheb Wooley singles chronology
"I Found Me an Angel" / "So Close to Heaven" (1958)	"The Purple People Eater" / "I Can't Believe You're Mine" (1958)	"The Chase" / "Monkey Jive" (1958)

Music videos
- The Purple People Eater on YouTube, by Sheb Wooley. MGM Records (1958). (2:18 minutes, with lyrics)
- The Purple People Eater on YouTube, by Sheb Wooley. Television performance (1958). (1:59 minutes)
- The Purple People Eater #2 on YouTube, by Ben Colder, a.k.a. Sheb Wooley. MGM Records (1967). (2:33 minutes)
- Purple People Eater on YouTube, by Sheb Wooley. Gusto Records (1979). (2:25 minutes)

"The Purple People Eater" is a novelty song written and performed by Sheb Wooley, which reached number one on the Billboard pop charts in 1958 from June 9 to July 14, number one in Canada, number 12 overall in the UK Singles Chart, and topped the Australian chart.

== Composition ==
The premise of the song came from a joke told by the child of a friend of Wooley's, fellow songwriter Don Robertson:

What has one eye, one horn, flies and eats people? A one-eyed, one-horned, flying people eater.

Wooley finished composing the song within an hour, later describing it as "undoubtedly the worst song he had ever written.” According to Wooley, MGM Records initially rejected the song, saying that it was not the type of music with which they wanted to be identified. An acetate of the song reached MGM Records' New York office. The acetate became popular with the office's young people. Up to 50 people would listen to the song at lunchtime. The front office noticed, reconsidered their decision, and decided to release the song.

The recording was arranged by Neely Plumb. The voice of the purple people eater is a sped-up recording, giving it a voice similar to--but not quite as high-pitched or as fast as--Mike Sammes's 1957 Pinky and Perky show, or Ross Bagdasarian's 1958 "Witch Doctor" and "The Chipmunk Song". Alvin and the Chipmunks eventually covered "Purple People Eater" for their 1998 album The A-Files: Alien Songs. The sound of a toy saxophone was produced in a similar fashion, as the saxophone was originally recorded at a reduced speed.

"The Purple People Eater" tells how a strange creature from outer space (described as a "one-eyed, one-horned, flying, purple people eater") descends to Earth because it wants to be in a rock 'n' roll band. Much of the song's humor derives from toying with the listener's expectations. The creature is initially described as having "one long horn", suggestive of an anatomical horn, yet the song ends with the creature playing music from the horn, implying that it is acoustic or instrumental. The song includes the high-pitched alien voice referencing several then-current popular songs: "Short Shorts", the opening riff of "Tutti Frutti", and "Tequila!"

Likewise, challenging the listener's assumption that the creature is a purple-colored people-eater, the creature asserts that it eats purple people:

I said Mr. Purple People Eater, what's your line?
He said eating purple people, and it sure is fine,
But that's not the reason that I came to land
I wanna get a job in a rock 'n' roll band.

The creature also declines to eat the narrator "'cause [he's] so tough", a term which can be interpreted either as fierce or not easily chewed.

Attempts to clarify the ambiguities in the song have persisted since its original release. The 1958 sheet music portrayed a purple creature playing the single horn on his head like a woodwind instrument, and MGM used the same image on record sleeves in foreign markets such as Australia and Japan. In response to requests from radio disc jockeys to portray the creature, listeners drew pictures that show a purple-colored people eater.

== Chart performance ==
Chart (1958)	Peak position
US Billboard Top 100	1

== Notable recordings ==
- The Sheb Wooley version crossed to the Billboard R&B Best Sellers in Stores chart, peaking at number 18.
- Wooley recorded another version of the song in 1967, titled "The Purple People Eater #2" and credited to his alter ego Ben Colder, on the MGM label.
- Wooley re-recorded the song in 1979 under the title "Purple People Eater", which Gusto Records released through its King Records subsidiary.
- Jackie Dennis covered the song in 1958, and his version reached number 29 in the UK.
- Judy Garland recorded the song on her 1958 Capitol Records album Garland at the Grove, accompanied by Freddy Martin and his Orchestra, issued as Capitol T 1118 (mono) and ST 1118 (stereo).
- A cover version recorded by British comedian Barry Cryer reached number one in the Finnish chart after contractual reasons prevented Wooley's version being released in Scandinavia.
- Screaming Lord Sutch and the Savages recorded a version released exclusively for the Swedish market on the Hep Stars independent record label Hep House. It reached number 11 on the Tio i Topp chart in January 1967.
- A dubstep song under the title "Purple People Eater" by the Dano-Norwegian electronic music group Pegboard Nerds was released in 2018 and samples the original piece.

== Popular culture ==
In the May 28th, 1958 episode of Leave it to Beaver, "Flying Purple People Eater" is referenced as the answer to a riddle with which Ward Cleaver stumps Wally and "the Beaver". The enduring popularity of the song led to the nicknaming of the highly effective "Purple People Eaters", the Minnesota Vikings defensive line of the 1970s, whose primary team color is purple.

From 1982, major British toy manufacturer Waddingtons marketed a children's game inspired by the song. Players competed to remove tiny "people" from the rubber Purple People Eater shell, using tweezers on a wire loop, which activated an alarm if coming into contact with its metal jaws.

In the 1984 postapocalyptic novel Brother in the Land, cannibals are nicknamed "Purples", from the song.

In 1988, a film of the same name based on the song was released.

The 2022 film Nope features a cinematographer, Antlers Holst, who is hired to capture an alien on camera. While preparing to capture camera footage of the alien creature, Holst recites the lyrics from "The Purple People Eater".

In winter 2022/2023, the USDA Agricultural Research Service held the "Name that Holiday Pepper – Violet to Red" contest on Challenge.gov to name new varieties of ornamental peppers they had developed. The winning name for a purple pepper with cayenne pepper spiciness level was "Purple People Heater".

The 2024 animated series X-Men '97 utilized the song as a personal theme song for Bastion when he tortures Magneto.
