= A Wound Time Can't Erase =

Single by Stonewall Jackson

from the album I Love a Song
- B-side: "Second Choice"
- Released: November 10, 1961
- Recorded: 1961
- Genre: Country
- Length: 2:37
- Label: Columbia
- Songwriter: Bill Johnson

Stonewall Jackson singles chronology
| "Hungry for Love" (1961) | "A Wound Time Can't Erase" (1961) | "Second Choice" (1962) |

"A Wound Time Can't Erase" is a song written by Bill Johnson, performed by Stonewall Jackson, and released on the Columbia label (catalog no. 4–42229). It debuted on the Billboard country and western chart in January 1962, peaked at the No. 3 spot, and remained on the chart for a total of 22 weeks. It reached No. 1 on the Cash Box country chart and was ranked No. 6 on Billboard's 1962 year-end country and western chart. It was Jackson's third number one hit following Life to Go (1958) and Waterloo (1959).

== Lyrics ==
The song's lyrics tell of heartbreak suffered after vowing to love a woman evermore, leaving a wound that time can't erase. The lyrics question whether the woman is satisfied, glad, footloose and fancy free, or laughing in his face.

== Cover versions ==
The song has been covered by numerous artists over the years, including Red Sovine (1962), Bill Pursell (1963), Kitty Wells (1964), Don Gibson (1965), Loretta Lynn (1965), Johnny Cash (1966), Jack Greene (1966), Hank Snow (1968), Wanda Jackson (1973), The Kentucky Colonels (1975), Moe Bandy (1978), Ricky Skaggs (1987), Porter Wagoner (1989), Conway Twitty, George Jones, Claude Gray, Jan Howard, and Alison Krauss.

== See also ==
- Billboard Top Country & Western Records of 1962
