= Open Pit Mine =

Single by George Jones

from the album The New Favorites of George Jones
- B-side: "Geronimo"
- Released: 1962
- Recorded: 1962
- Genre: Country
- Length: 3:09
- Label: United Artists
- Songwriter(s): Delbert T. Gentry
- Producer(s): Pappy Daily

George Jones singles chronology
"She Thinks I Still Care" (1962)	"Open Pit Mine" (1962)	"A Girl I Used to Know" (1962)

"Open Pit Mine" is a murder ballad by George Jones. It was composed by Delbert T. Gentry and released as Jones' third single for United Artists in 1962. The song reached top 20 on the country singles chart.

== Background ==
"Open Pit Mine" is a first person narrative that tells a story of an unnamed Arizona copper miner and his wife Rosie. The Phoenix magazine characterized the song as a "dark romantic torment", in which miner sings "there was nothing for Rosie that I wouldn't do" and it is her love that inspires him to continue with his dreary work. However, after learning that she has been having an affair, he shoots her and her lover "while their arms were entwined" and buries her body in the open pit mine.

The song was atypical for Jones, containing no chorus and sparse, folk-tinged instrumentation. He would recut the song a few years later on the Musicor label.
