= Big Fool of the Year =

Single by George Jones

from the album album George Jones Sings More New Favorites
- A-side: "A Girl I Used to Know"
- Released: 1962
- Genre: Country
- Length: 2:30
- Label: United Artists
- Songwriter(s): Justin Tubb
- Producer(s): Pappy Daily

George Jones singles chronology
| "Open Pit Mine" (1962) | "Big Fool of the Year" (1962) | "Lonely Christmas Call" |

"Big Fool of the Year" is a song written by Justin Tubb and recorded by George Jones. It appeared as the B-side of Jones' 1962 hit "A Girl I Used to Know," climbing to #13 on the charts. In the song, the narrator is awarded with the dubious honor of "big fool of the year" by "every hopeless loving heart" that he knows. In isolation, the song's lyrics might appear to be those for a novelty number but Jones, with typical gravitas, transforms them into a self-pitying diatribe, confessing, "For to love you after all you've made me suffer surely makes me the big fool of the year." Hank Williams, Jr. also recorded the song for his 1972 LP Eleven Roses.
