= A Girl I Used to Know =

Single by George Jones

from the album George Jones Sings More New Favorites
- B-side: "Big Fool of the Year"
- Released: 1962
- Recorded: 1962
- Genre: Country
- Length: 2:42
- Label: United Artists
- Songwriter: Jack Clement
- Producer: Pappy Daily

George Jones singles chronology
"Open Pit Mine" (1962)	"A Girl I Used to Know" (1962)	"Lonely Christmas Call" (1963)

"A Girl I Used to Know" (also known as "Just Someone I Used to Know" and "Someone I Used to Know") is a song written by Jack Clement and originally released as a single by George Jones. It became a top five hit for Jones, peaking at number three. Porter Wagoner and Dolly Parton recorded the song as "Just Someone I Used to Know", with the single becoming a number five hit in 1969, and earning a nomination for Best Country Performance by a Duo or Group at the 12th Annual Grammy Awards. It was Wagoner's eighth nomination and Parton's first. In 1970, Jones recorded the song again with wife Tammy Wynette for their debut duet album We Go Together.

== Cover versions ==
In 1971, Jimmy Dean and Dottie West recorded the song for their album Country Boy & Country Girl. The same year, The Statler Brothers released a version of the song on their album Pictures of Moments to Remember .

Emmylou Harris recorded the song as a duet with John Anderson for her 1986 album Thirteen.

Lee Ann Womack included a version of the song on her 2005 album There's More Where That Came From.

Adam Harvey and Beccy Cole included the song on their 2017 album The Great Country Songbook Volume 2.
