= Charlie's Shoes =

Single by Billy Walker
- B-side: "Wild Colonial Boy"
- Released: February 1962
- Recorded: November 20, 1961; Nashville, Tennessee
- Genre: Country
- Length: 2:14
- Label: Columbia
- Songwriter: Roy Baham
- Producer: Don Law

Billy Walker singles chronology
| "Funny How Time Slips Away" (1961) | "Charlie's Shoes" (1962) | "Willie the Weeper" (1962) |

"Charlie's Shoes", also known as "(I'd Like to Be In) Charlie's Shoes", is a song written by Roy Baham released as a single in 1962 by Billy Walker. It was the only number-one country hit of Walker's career, spending two non-consecutive weeks at the top spot and 23 weeks on the chart.

== Cover Versions ==
- Guy Mitchell also released a version in 1962. It failed to make the Billboard Hot 100 stopping well outside the chart at # 110.
- The song has also been cut by other artists such as Eddy Arnold's version in 1962.
- Faron Young.

== Chart performance ==
| Chart (1962) | Peak position |
|---|---|
| United States Billboard Hot C&W Sides | 1 |
