= Devil Woman (Marty Robbins song) =

Single by Marty Robbins

from the album Devil Woman
- B-side: "April Fool's Day"
- Released: June 22, 1962
- Genre: Country
- Length: 2:51
- Label: Columbia
- Songwriter: Marty Robbins
- Producers: Don Law; Frank Jones

Marty Robbins singles chronology
"Love Can't Wait" (1962)	"Devil Woman" (1962)	"Ruby Ann" (1962)

Devil Woman is a song written and recorded by American country music artist Marty Robbins. It was released in June 1962 as the first single and title track from the album Devil Woman. It was also Robbins' seventh single to reach number one on the country chart, spending eight weeks at the top spot. "Devil Woman" also crossed over onto the pop chart, peaking at number 16. Overseas, "Devil Woman" was Robbins' most successful single on the UK charts.

== Other versions by notable artists ==
- Trini Lopez recorded the song for his 1968 album Welcome to Trini Country.
- Grady Martin released an instrumental version in 1965 on his album Instrumentally Yours.
- A Spanish language version of the song, named "Magia Blanca" (translated by then-television host Alfred D. Herger), was Chucho Avellanet's first career hit in 1963.
- Other versions in Spanish of this song was released also by Hermanos Carrión (in Mexico),
- Gustavo Hit Moreno (in Peru, 1963)
- Trio Venezuela
- Chucho Sanoja and his orchestra (both in Venezuela).
- A Serbo-Croatian version of the song, named "Čudna devojka", was released in 1966 by Yugoslav beat band Zlatni Dečaci.
- The song was recorded by Singaporean female artist Zhuang Xue Fang (莊雪芳) in edited Standard Chinese lyrics written by Suyin (舒雲/雨牛) under title name of 小小寃家, with Ruby Records in 1967.

== Chart performance ==
Chart (1962)	Peak position
UK Singles (OCC)	5
US Hot Country Songs (Billboard)	1
US Billboard Hot 100	16
