= That's My Pa =

Single by Sheb Wooley

from the album That's My Pa and That's My Ma
- B-side: "Meet Mr. Lonely"
- Released: December 1961
- Genre: Country
- Label: MGM
- Songwriter(s): Sheb Wooley
- Producer(s): Jesse Kaye; Jim Vienneau

Sheb Wooley singles chronology
"Sweet Chile" (1959)	"That's My Pa" (1961)	"Don't Go Near the Eskimos" (1962)

"That's My Pa" is a 1962 single by Sheb Wooley. "That's My Pa" would be Sheb Wooley's first single to hit the country chart, and was also his most successful release hitting the number one spot for one week and staying on the charts for seventeen weeks.

== Chart performance ==
Chart (1961–1962)	Peak position
U.S. Billboard Hot C&W Sides	1
U.S. Billboard Hot 100	51
Canada CHUM Chart	11 (for 3 weeks)
