= Claude King =

American country music singer-songwriter (1923–2013)

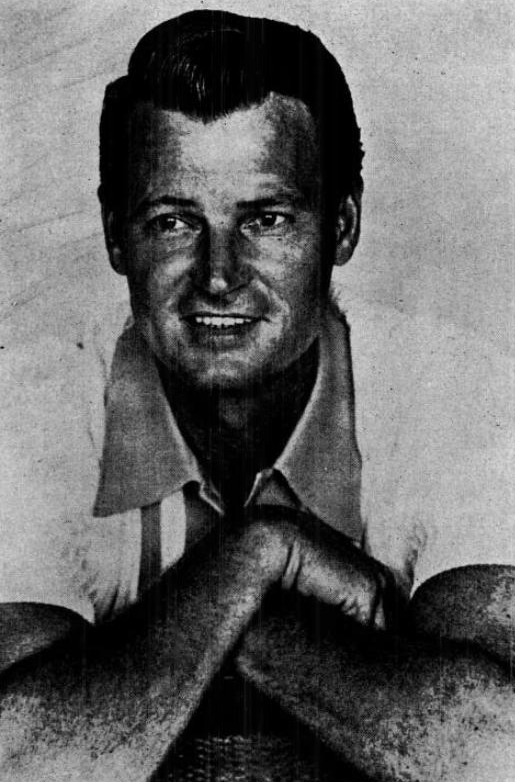
- King in 1966

Background information
- Born: February 5, 1923; Keithville, Louisiana, U.S.
- Died: March 7, 2013 (aged 90) Shreveport, Louisiana, U.S.
- Genre: Country
- Occupation: Singer-songwriter
- Instruments: Vocals; guitar
- Years active: 1935–2013
- Labels: Columbia Records; Specialty Records
- Formerly of: Louisiana Hayride

Claude King (February 5, 1923 – March 7, 2013) was an American country music singer and songwriter. He is best known for his 1962 million-selling hit, "Wolverton Mountain".

== Biography ==
King was born in Keithville in southern Caddo Parish south of Shreveport in northwestern Louisiana. At a young age, he was interested in music but also in athletics and the outdoors. He purchased a guitar at the age of 12, and although he learned to play, most of his time was devoted to sports. He received a baseball scholarship to the University of Idaho at Moscow, Idaho.

From 1942 to 1945, he served in the United States Navy during World War II.

=== Music career ===
King formed a band with his friends Buddy Attaway and Tillman Franks called the Rainbow Boys. The trio played around Shreveport in their spare time while working an assortment of other jobs. He joined the Louisiana Hayride, a television and radio show produced at the Shreveport Municipal Auditorium and broadcast throughout the United States and in the United Kingdom. King was frequently on the same programs with Elvis Presley, Tex Ritter, Johnny Cash, Hank Williams, Webb Pierce, Kitty Wells, Jimmie Davis, Slim Whitman, Faron Young, Johnny Horton, Jim Reeves, George Jones, Tommy Tomlinson, and Lefty Frizzell.

King recorded a few songs for Gotham Records, though none was successful. In 1961, he became more serious about a musical career and signed with the Nashville division of Columbia Records. He struck immediately, cutting "Big River, Big Man", both a country top 10 and a small pop crossover success. He soon followed with "The Comancheros" inspired by the John Wayne film of the same name It was a top-10 country hit in late 1961 and crossed over into the popular chart.

King released his best-known recording in the spring of 1962. "Wolverton Mountain", written with Nashville veteran Merle Kilgore, is based on a real character, Clifton Clowers, an uncle of Kilgore's who lived on Wolverton Mountain north of Morrilton, Arkansas. King and Kilgore agree that the original composition of the song lacked polish and that King eventually shaped the song into the hit that it became. According to long-time King guitarist, Robin Vosbury, Clowers came to numerous shows and asked everybody to call him "Uncle Clifton". The song became an immediate hit. For nine weeks beginning on June 30, 1962, it ranked number one on the Billboard country chart, on which it remained for a total of 26 weeks. It was also a Top-10 hit on the Billboard Hot 100. Having sold more than one million copies, it was awarded gold disc status.

King followed up with a song about the 1864 battle of Atlanta in the Civil War. "The Burning Of Atlanta" also reached the Top 10 on the country chart and made the pop chart. In late 1962, King recorded "I've Got the World by The Tail", which narrowly missed the country Top 10.

In 1963, King scored three country hits with "Sheepskin Valley", "Building a Bridge", and "Hey Lucille!" The hits continued in 1964 with "Sam Hill", and in 1965, he was back in the Top 10 with "Tiger Woman", co-written with Merle Kilgore. King did well that year with "Little Buddy". His smooth style continued to find favor throughout the decade, especially songs such as "Catch a Little Raindrop" and the Top-10 hit, "All for the Love of a Girl" in 1969. His singles continued to make the country charts through 1972. He left the label in 1973 after 29 hits.

In 1977, King recorded in some sessions for producer Howard A. Knight, Jr. On March 23 of that year, he recorded "No Thanks Boys", which was not released. On the 25th, he recorded again, and one of the tracks was "Cotton Dan". Other sessions that were produced by Knight were on April 26 and June 7 and 8.

Besides a career in recording and touring, King performed as an actor in several movies. Along with his great-nephew, Chris Aable, King is among the few actors who are members in both the Screen Actors Guild and the American Society of Composers, Authors and Publishers. King had roles in several feature films, including 1971's Swamp Girl and 1972's Year of the Yahoo!.

In 1981, Governor Frank D. White of Arkansas paid tribute to King by declaring August 7 "Wolverton Mountain Day".

On June 3, 2003, King released a CD called Cowboy in the White House, co-produced with Robin Vosbury and Tillman Franks and released by Sun Records. Elvis Presley's guitarist, James Burton, also performs on the album.

On February 11, 2007, King was inducted into the Greater Shreveport Chamber of Commerce Walk of Stars. He joined other celebrities with strong ties to the Greater Shreveport area in this honor, including Terry Bradshaw, Kix Brooks, Johnnie Cochran, Tom Jarriel, Joe Ferguson, Eddie Robinson, Hal Sutton, and David Toms, as well as his musical colleagues, James Burton, Jim Reeves, Faron Young, Jimmie Davis, Chris Aable, Elvis Presley, and Tillman Franks.

King was a part of the "Magic Circle", which was a description of the ArkLaTex area coined by his longtime friend Tillman Franks, described as: "an area 50 miles in radius from downtown Shreveport. All kinds of music evolved from this Magic Circle."

In 2011, King was named one of "Five Living Legends of Shreveport" by Danny Fox of KWKH radio.

=== Death ===
King died suddenly at his home in Shreveport on March 7, 2013, at the age of 90. He was survived by his wife, the former Barbara Coco, with whom he had celebrated their 67th wedding anniversary a month prior to his death. Together, they had three sons.

Services were held on March 13, 2013, at the Centuries Funeral Home Chapel in Shreveport, with the Reverend William D. "Billy" Franks and the Reverend Tim Maloy officiating. Interment followed at Centuries Memorial Park.

== Discography ==
=== Albums ===
Year	Album	Chart Positions		Label
Year	Album	US Country	US	Label
1962	Meet Claude King	—	80	Columbia
1965	Tiger Woman	—	—	Columbia
1968	The Best of Claude King	—	—	Columbia
1969	I Remember Johnny Horton	24	—	Columbia
1970	Friend, Lover, Woman, Wife	—	—	Columbia
1971	Chip 'N' Dale's Place	45	—	Columbia

=== Singles ===
Year	Single	Chart positions				Album
Year	Single	US Country	US Cash Box Country	US	CAN Country	Album
1961	"Big River, Big Man"	7	9	82	—	Meet Claude King
1961	"The Comancheros"^{a}	7	6	71	—	Meet Claude King
1962	"Wolverton Mountain"^{b}	1	1	6	—	Meet Claude King
1962	"Little Bitty Heart"	—	41	—	—	Meet Claude King
1962	"The Burning of Atlanta"	10	9	53	—	singles only
1963	"I've Got the World by the Tail"	11	11	111	—	singles only
1963	"Sheepskin Valley"	12	17	—	—	singles only
1963	"Building a Bridge"	12	41	—	—	singles only
1963	"Hey Lucille! /"	13	13	—	—	singles only
1963	"Scarlet O'Hara"	—	34	—	—	singles only
1964	"That's What Makes the World Go Around"	33	28	—	—	singles only
1964	"Sam Hill"	11	12	—	2	singles only
1965	"Whirlpool (Of Your Love)"	47	31	—	—	singles only
1965	"Tiger Woman"	6	5	110	—	Tiger Woman
1966	"Little Buddy"	17	15	—	—	Tiger Woman
1966	"Catch a Little Raindrop"	13	12	—	—	Tiger Woman
1966	"The Juggler"	—	34	—	—	singles only
1966	"Little Things That Every Girl Should Know"	50	44	—	—	singles only
1967	"The Watchman"	32	34	—	—	singles only
1967	"Laura (What's He Got That I Ain't Got)"	50	44	—	—	singles only
1967	"Yellow Haired Woman"	59	40	—	—	singles only
1968	"Parchman Farm Blues"	67	—	—	—	singles only
1968	"The Power of Your Sweet Love"	48	—	—	—	singles only
1969	"Sweet Love On My Mind"	52	43	—	—	Friend, Lover, Woman, Wife
1969	"All for the Love of a Girl"	9	8	—	—	Friend, Lover, Woman, Wife
1969	"Friend, Lover, Woman, Wife"	18	50	—	14	Friend, Lover, Woman, Wife
1969	"House Of The Rising Sun"	—	—	—	28	Friend, Lover, Woman, Wife
1970	"I'll Be Your Baby Tonight"	33	24	—	39	Chip 'N' Dale's Place
1970	"Mary's Vineyard"	17	23	—	13	Chip 'N' Dale's Place
1971	"Chip 'N' Dale's Place"	23	8	—	7	Chip 'N' Dale's Place
1971	"When You're Twenty-One"	54	—	—	—	singles only
1972	"Darlin' Raise the Shade (Let the Sun Shine In)"	57	46	—	32	singles only
1972	"The Lady Of Our Town"	—	73	—	—	singles only
1972	"He Ain't Country"	48	45	—	—	singles only
1977	"Cotton Dan"	94	—	—	—	singles only

- ^{a}"The Comancheros" reached number 9 on Canada's CHUM chart.
- ^{b}"Wolverton Mountain" peaked at number three on Hot Adult Contemporary Tracks and number one on Canada's CHUM chart.
