= Billy Walker (musician) =

American country music singer and guitarist (1929–2006)

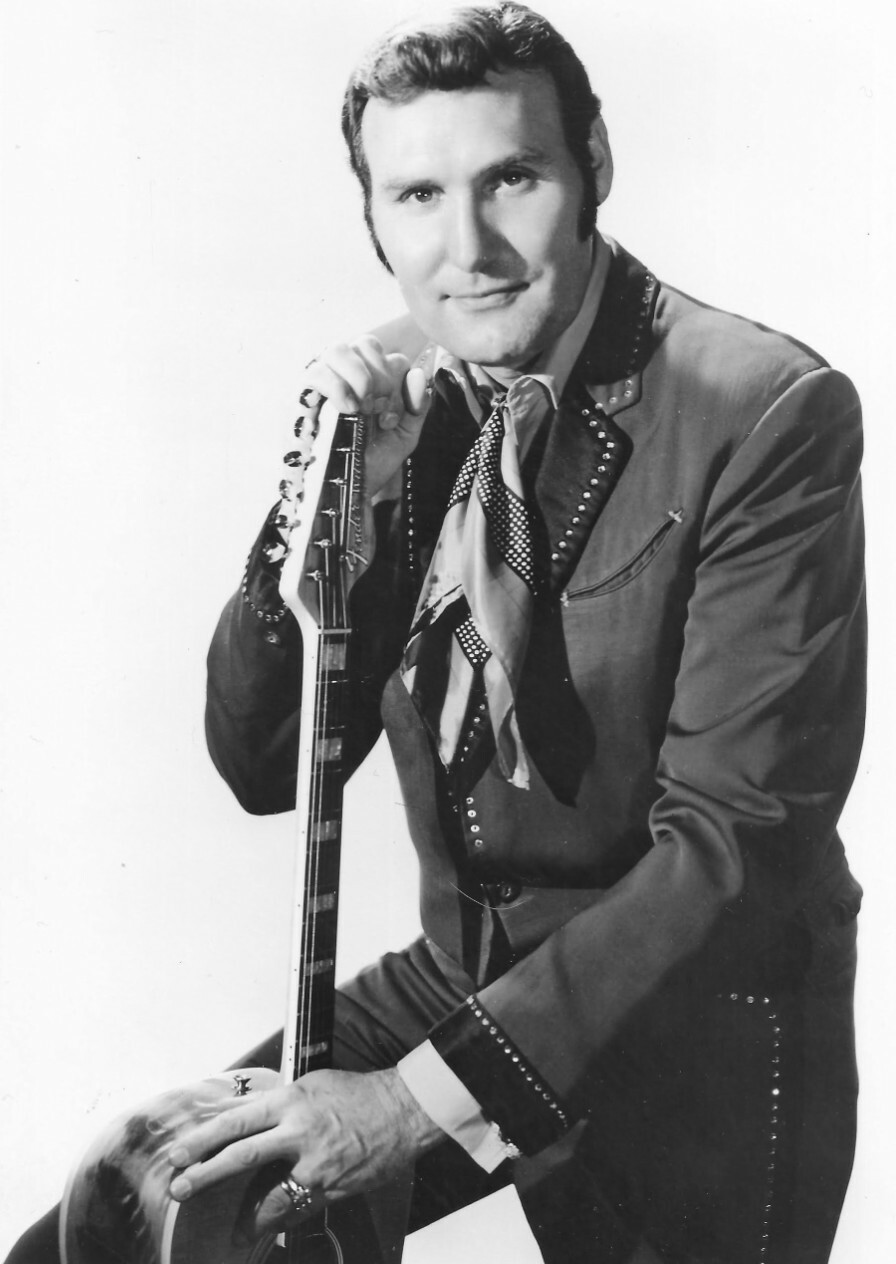

Background information
- Born: William Marvin Walker; January 14, 1929; Ralls, Texas, U.S.
- Died: May 21, 2006 (aged 77) Fort Deposit, Alabama, U.S.
- Genres: Country, rock and roll
- Occupation: Singer, songwriter
- Instrument: Guitar
- Years active: 1947–2006
- Labels: Capitol, Columbia, Monument, MGM, RCA, Tall Texan
- Website: billywalker.com

William Marvin Walker (January 14, 1929 – May 21, 2006) was an American country music singer and guitarist best known for his 1962 hit, "Charlie's Shoes". Nicknamed The Tall Texan, Walker had more than 30 charting records during a nearly 60-year career, and was a longtime member of the Grand Ole Opry.

== Biography ==
=== Early years ===
Billy Walker was born in Ralls, Texas, United States, and was the youngest of three children. His mother died when he was only six years old, and Billy's father was unable to care for him and his two older brothers. Some of the children, including Billy, were placed in a Methodist orphanage in Waco, Texas. He attended High School in Whiteface, Texas, and had won a talent contest which entitled him to appear on radio in Clovis, New Mexico. He had returned to live with his father at the age of 11. Inspired by the music of Gene Autry as a teenager, he had begun his professional music career in 1947 at age 18. After his debut on Clovis radio as a teenager he later joined the Big D Jamboree in Dallas in 1949. The same year, Hank Thompson helped him sign with Capitol Records after he worked with Walker in Waco. His manager at the time had him wear a Lone Ranger-style black mask and billed him as The Traveling Texan, the Masked Singer of Country Songs.

In 1951, Walker signed with Columbia Records and the following year joined the Louisiana Hayride in Shreveport, Louisiana, where he and Slim Whitman were responsible in part for Elvis Presley's first appearance on the radio program. In 1954, Walker scored his first hit with "Thank You for Calling". His early Columbia recordings were at a Dallas studio owned by producer Jim Beck, responsible for hits by Ray Price, Lefty Frizzell and others. In 1955, Walker, Presley and Tillman Franks teamed up for a tour of West Texas. Walker soon became a cast member of ABC-TV's Ozark Jubilee in Springfield, Missouri, where he began a long friendship with host, Red Foley.

=== Country music career ===
After a brief attempt at rock and roll, Walker played the Texas bar circuit before moving to Nashville, Tennessee, in 1959 and joining the Grand Ole Opry in 1960. He was one of the first artists to record a Willie Nelson song; and his 1961 version of "Funny How Time Slips Away" reached No. 23 on Billboard's country singles chart and helped establish Walker's national reputation. In 1962, he topped the chart with "Charlie's Shoes", the only No. 1 single of his career. His smooth tenor was well-suited to other Western-inspired hits including "Matamoros" and "Cross the Brazos at Waco" (1964).

After performing at a charity concert in Kansas City, Kansas on March 3, 1963, Walker received a call to return to Nashville. Fellow performer Hawkshaw Hawkins gave Walker his commercial airline ticket, and instead flew back to Tennessee on March 5 on a private plane, which crashed, killing Hawkins, Patsy Cline, Cowboy Copas and pilot Randy Hughes.

After leaving Columbia in 1965, Walker signed with producer Fred Foster's Monument Records and moved to MGM in 1970 and to RCA Records in 1974. He later recorded for several independent labels, including his own Tall Texan label.

In the late 1960s, he hosted a syndicated television show, Billy Walker’s Country Carnival, and appeared on other country music TV programs. Walker performed around the world, and several times during the 1980s sang at the International Festival of Country Music at Wembley Arena in London. In April 2006, Walker recorded the duet "All I Ever Need Is You" with Danish singer Susanne Lana for Hillside House Records. The recording, at Signal Path Studio in Nashville, Tennessee, was produced by Charlie McCoy.

Walker continued to tour and remained a mainstay on the Grand Ole Opry, and was scheduled to perform two days following his death with Terri Clark, Porter Wagoner and others.

=== Death ===
On May 21, 2006, Walker died in a road accident when the van he was driving back to Nashville after a performance in Foley, Alabama, veered off Interstate 65 in Fort Deposit and overturned. His wife Bettie; bassist Charles Lilly Jr., son of Everett Lilly of The Lilly Brothers; and guitarist Daniel Patton were also killed. The Walkers, Lilly, and Patton died instantly. Walker's grandson, Joshua Brooks, survived with serious injuries. Walker was interred in Spring Hill Cemetery in Nashville.

== Discography ==
=== Albums ===
Year	Album	US Country	Label
1961	Everybody's Hits but Mine	—	Columbia
1963	Greatest Hits	—	Columbia
1964	Anything Your Heart Desires	—	Columbia
1964	Thank You for Calling	18	Columbia
1965	The Gun, The Gold and the Girl / Cross the Brazos at Waco	13	Columbia
1966	A Million and One	13	Monument
1967	The Walker Way	37	Monument
1968	I Taught Her Everything She Knows	38	Monument
1968	Salutes the Country Music Hall of Fame	—	Monument
1969	Portrait of Billy	40	Monument
1969	How Big Is God	—	Monument
1970	Darling Days	—	Monument
1970	When a Man Loves a Woman (The Way That I Love You)	40	MGM
1971	I'm Gonna Keep On Lovin' You / She Goes Walkin' Through My Mind	44	MGM
1971	Live	—	MGM
1973	The Billy Walker Show (with Mike Curb Congregation)	—	MGM
1973	All Time Greatest Hits	—	MGM
1973	The Hand of Love	—	MGM
1974	Too Many Memories	—	MGM
1974	Fine as Wine	—	
1975	Lovin' and Losin'	27	RCA
1976	Alone Again	47	RCA
1980	Bye Bye Love (with Barbara Fairchild)	—	RCA
1984	Life Is a Song	—	EMH

=== Singles ===
Year	Single	Chart Positions			Album
Year	Single	US Country	US	CAN Country	Album
1954	"Thank You for Calling"	8	—	—	singles only
1957	"On My Mind Again"	12	—	—	singles only
1960	"Forever"	—	83	—	singles only
1960	"I Wish You Love"	19	—	—	singles only
1961	"Funny How Time Slips Away"	23	—	—	Greatest Hits
1962	"Charlie's Shoes"	1	—	—	Greatest Hits
1962	"Willie the Weeper"	5	—	—	Greatest Hits
1963	"Heart, Be Careful"	21	—	—	Thank You for Calling
1963	"The Morning Paper"	22	—	—	Thank You for Calling
1964	"Circumstances"	7	—	—	Thank You for Calling
1964	"It's Lonesome"	43	—	—	Thank You for Calling
1964	"Cross the Brazos at Waco"	2	128	5	The Gun, the Gold and the Girl / Cross the Brazos at Waco
1965	"Matamoros"	8	—	—	The Gun, the Gold and the Girl / Cross the Brazos at Waco
1965	"If It Pleases You"	16	—	—	singles only
1965	"I'm So Miserable Without You"	45	—	—	singles only
1966	"The Old French Quarter (In New Orleans)"	49	—	—	A Million and One
1966	"A Million and One"	2	—	—	A Million and One
1966	"Bear with Me a Little Longer"	3	—	—	The Walker Way
1967	"Anything Your Heart Desires"	10	—	—	The Walker Way
1967	"In Del Rio"	18	—	—	I Taught Her Everything She Knows
1967	"I Taught Her Everything She Knows"	11	—	19	I Taught Her Everything She Knows
1968	"Sundown Mary"	18	—	—	Portrait of Billy
1968	"Ramona"	8	—	14	Portrait of Billy
1968	"Age of Worry"	20	—	24	Portrait of Billy
1969	"From the Bottle to the Bottom" (with The Tennessee Walkers)	20	—	—	Portrait of Billy
1969	"Smoky Places"	12	—	—	Darling Days
1969	"Better Homes and Gardens"	37	—	—	Darling Days
1969	"Thinking 'Bout You, Babe"	9	—	32	Darling Days
1970	"Darling Days"	23	—	—	Darling Days
1970	"When a Man Loves a Woman (The Way That I Love You)"	3	—	—	When a Man Loves a Woman (The Way That I Love You)
1970	"She Goes Walking Through My Mind"	3	—	8	I'm Gonna Keep On Lovin' You / She Goes Walking Through My Mind
1971	"I'm Gonna Keep On Keep On Lovin' You"	3	—	26	I'm Gonna Keep On Lovin' You / She Goes Walking Through My Mind
1971	"It's Time to Love Her"	28	—	—	singles only
1971	"Don't Let Him Make a Memory Out of Me"	22	—	—	singles only
1971	"Traces of a Woman"	25	—	34	singles only
1972	"Sing Me a Love Song to Baby"	3	—	63	All Time Greatest Hits
1973	"My Mind Hangs on to You"	34	—	—	All Time Greatest Hits
1973	"The Hand of Love"	52	—	—	The Hand of Love
1973	"Margarita"	—	—	—	The Hand of Love
1973	"Too Many Memories"	96	—	—	Too Many Memories
1974	"I Changed My Mind"	39	—	63	Too Many Memories
1974	"How Far Our Love Goes"	74	—	—	singles only
1974	"Fine as Wine"	73	—	—	singles only
1975	"Word Games"	10	—	13	Lovin' and Losin'
1975	"If I'm Losing You"	25	—	31	Lovin' and Losin'
1975	"Don't Stop in My World (If You Don't Mean to Stay)"	19	—	18	Alone Again
1976	"(Here I Am) Alone Again"	41	—	—	Alone Again
1976	"Love You All to Pieces"	67	—	—	singles only
1976	"Instead of Givin' Up (I'm Givin' In)"	48	—	—	singles only
1977	"(If You Can) Why Can't I"	100	—	—	singles only
1977	"It Always Brings Me Back Around to You"	86	—	—	singles only
1977	"Ringgold, Georgia" (with Brenda Kaye Perry)	64	—	—	singles only
1978	"Carlena and Jose Gomez"	57	—	—	singles only
1978	"It's Not Over Till It's Over"	92	—	—	singles only
1978	"You're a Violin That Never Has Been Played"	82	—	55	singles only
1979	"Lawyers"	72	—	—	singles only
1979	"Sweet Lovin' Things"	69	—	—	singles only
1979	"Rainbow and Roses"	flip	—	—	singles only
1979	"A Little Bit Short on Love (A Little Bit Long on Tears)"	70	—	—	singles only
1980	"You Turn My Love Light On"	48	—	—	singles only
1980	"Answer Game"	—	—	—	singles only
1983	"One Away from One Too Many"	93	—	—	Life Is a Song
1983	"Pardon My Asking"	—	—	—	Life Is a Song
1985	"Coffee Brown Eyes"	81	—	—	singles only
1988	"Wild Texas Rose"	79	—	—	singles only

=== Singles from collaboration albums ===
Year	Single	Artist	US Country	Album
1972	"Gone (Our Endless Love)"	Mike Curb Congregation	24	The Billy Walker Show
1980	"Let Me Be the One"	Barbara Fairchild	74	Bye Bye Love
1980	"Bye Bye Love"	Barbara Fairchild	70	Bye Bye Love
1980	"Love's Slipping Through Our Fingers (Leaving Time on Our Hands)"	Barbara Fairchild	79	Bye Bye Love
