= Sheb Wooley =

American musician and actor (1921–2003)

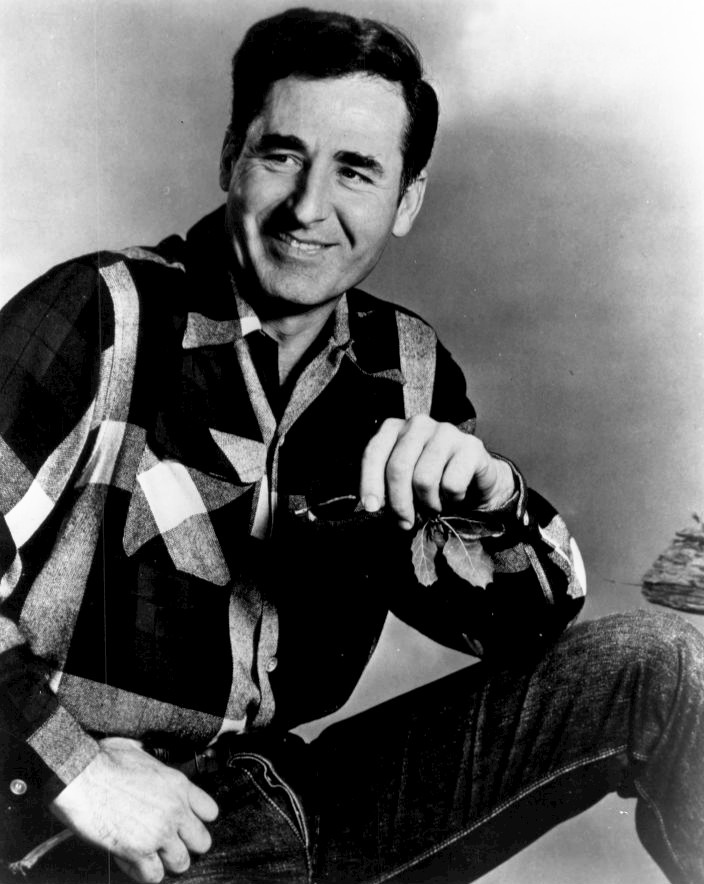
- Wooley in 1971
- Born: Shelby Fredrick Wooley; April 10, 1921; Erick, Oklahoma, U.S.
- Died: September 16, 2003 (aged 82); Nashville, Tennessee, U.S.
- Other name: Ben Colder
- Occupations: Singer; songwriter; actor; comedian
- Years active: 1936–1999
- Musical career
- Genres: Country; novelty; comedy; pop; rock and roll; Western swing
- Label: MGM

Shelby Fredrick Wooley (April 10, 1921 – September 16, 2003) was an American singer, songwriter, and actor. He recorded a series of novelty songs, including the 1958 hit rock-and-roll comedy single "The Purple People Eater", and under the name Ben Colder, the country hit "Almost Persuaded No. 2". As an actor, he portrayed Cletus Summers, the principal of Hickory High School and assistant coach in the 1986 film Hoosiers; Ben Miller, brother of Frank Miller in the film High Noon; Travis Cobb in The Outlaw Josey Wales; and scout Pete Nolan in the television series Rawhide. Wooley is also believed to be the voice actor who provided the Wilhelm scream and all of the other stock sound effects for Thomas J. Valentino's Major record label during the 1940s.

== Early life ==
Wooley was born in 1921 in Erick, Oklahoma, the third son of William C. Wooley and Ora E. Wooley. Wooley claimed to be part Cherokee. He had two older brothers, Logan and Hubert, and a younger brother, William. Federal census records for 1930 and 1940 identify Sheb's father only as a "farmer". Sheb learned to ride his father's horses at an early age, became a working cowboy, and later an accomplished rodeo rider.

At 19 years-old Wooley married 17-year-old Melva Miller, a cousin of future chart-topping singer, songwriter, and actor Roger Miller. Wooley became friends with Miller when he lived in Oklahoma, teaching the younger child how to play guitar chords and buying him his first fiddle. The Wooleys subsequently divorced.

When the United States entered World War II in the early 1940s, Wooley tried to enlist in the military, but was unsuccessful due to his numerous rodeo injuries. Instead, he worked in the oil industry and as a welder. In 1946, he moved to Fort Worth, Texas, where he earned a living as a country-western musician, recording songs and traveling for three years with a band throughout the South and Southwest. In Fort Worth, he also married for the second time, to Edna Talbott Bunt, a young widow with an infant son named Gary. The three of them left Texas in 1950 and moved to Hollywood, California, where Wooley hoped to establish himself as an actor or singer in film or in the rapidly expanding medium of television.

== Music career ==
At the age of 15, the musically talented Wooley formed a band called the "Plainview Melody Boys", that periodically performed on radio at station KASA in Elk City, Oklahoma. He started his recording career in 1945. His music encompassed Western swing, country, hillbilly, rock and roll, pop and novelty songs. At the start of the 1950s, Wooley began fusing Western swing with rhythm and blues, but later in his career, his music shifted to the more commercial Nashville sound.

In 1958, Wooley earned considerable fame with his hit rock-and-roll comedy single, "The Purple People Eater", using tape manipulation inspired by the David Seville single "Witch Doctor". In the United Kingdom, he enjoyed a minor hit with the comedy single "Luke the Spook" on the flip side of "My Only Treasure", a ballad in the country and western tradition. Wooley also had a string of country hits, with his "That's My Pa" reaching number one of Billboard's Hot Country Songs chart in March 1962. That same year, Wooley intended to record the song "Don't Go Near the Indians", but he was delayed by an acting job. Rex Allen beat him to it, and scored a hit. Wooley, however, did a sequel, "Don't Go Near the Eskimos", about a boy in Alaska named Ben Colder (who had never "been colder"). It was so successful that Wooley continued using the name Ben Colder, recording a parody of the hit "Achy Breaky Heart" with "Shaky Breaky Car". In December 1963, his single "Hootenanny Hoot" became a top-10 hit in Australia; in 1967 his song "The Love-in" (1967) was recognized as an acerbic commentary on the 1960s' counterculture.

In the late 1960s, Wooley wrote the theme song for the television series Hee Haw, and became a regular on that long-running series in the 1970s. He often appeared as the character Ben Colder, portrayed as a drunken country songwriter. Wooley also released music and performed both as himself and as Ben Colder.

Wooley's parody of the Tammy Wynette song "D.I.V.O.R.C.E." became an international hit when Billy Connolly covered it in 1975.

Wooley continued to tour internationally and make personal concert appearances until his death in 2003. Wooley recorded his last written song just four days before he died.

== Acting career ==
=== Film ===
Wooley appeared in dozens of Western films from the 1950s through the 1990s. He was in Rocky Mountain (1950), and he portrayed outlaw Ben Miller in High Noon (1952) and Baxter in Terror in a Texas Town (1958). He also acted in major films, including Giant, The Outlaw Josey Wales, Silverado, and Hoosiers.

=== Television ===
Wooley's work in syndicated TV Westerns series included appearances on The Range Rider, portraying outlaw Jim Younger on Stories of the Century (1954), and five appearances on The Adventures of Kit Carson (1951-1955). He appeared in The Lone Ranger episodes “Stage to Estacado” (1953), “Wake of War" (1953), "Message to Fort Apache" (1954), "Wagontrain" and "Wanted: The Lone Ranger" (1955). He portrayed Bill Bronson on The Cisco Kid, Harry Runyon in "The Unmasking" on My Friend Flicka, and Shev Jones in "The Iron Trail" on Cheyenne. He appeared twice on The Life and Legend of Wyatt Earp. Wooley's big break professionally came when he was cast as the drover Pete Nolan on Rawhide (1959–1965). Wooley also wrote and directed some of the episodes.

== The "Wilhelm scream" ==
Sheb Wooley is also believed to be the voice actor for the Wilhelm scream, a stock recording used by sound-effects teams in over 200 films. Wooley originally performed the scream in the 1951 adventure film Distant Drums in which he had an acting role. Wooley's widow Linda Dotson confirmed Sheb performed the scream.

== Personal life ==
Wooley was married five times, first to Melva Miller in 1940. In 1946 he married Edna Talbott Bunt in Fort Worth, Texas. His third wife was Beverly Irene Addington; the couple adopted a daughter, Chrystie Lynn, and remained together for 19 years. In 1985, he married Deanna Grughlin. Last he married his manager Linda Dotson, who already had a daughter, Shauna.

== Death ==
Wooley was diagnosed with leukemia in 1996, which forced him to retire from public performing three years later. He died of the illness at the age of 82 at the Skyline Medical Center in Nashville, Tennessee, on September 16, 2003. He was entombed in Hendersonville Memory Gardens in Hendersonville, Tennessee.

== Awards ==
Wooley was the recipient of numerous awards over the years for his accomplishments as a singer, actor, and writer for both comedic and dramatic productions. In 1968, he received the Country Music Association's Comedian of the Year award. He also received the 1992 Songwriter of the Year and two Golden Boot Awards.

== Discography ==
=== Albums ===
Year	Album	US Country	Label
1956	Sheb Wooley	—	MGM
1960	Songs from the Days of Rawhide	—	MGM
1962	That's My Pa and That's My Ma	—	MGM
1963	Tales of How the West Was Won	—	MGM
1963	Spoofing the Big Ones (as Ben Colder)	—	MGM
1963	Ben Colder (as Ben Colder)	—	MGM
1965	The Very Best	—	MGM
1965	It's a Big Land	—	MGM
1966	Big Ben Strikes Again (as Ben Colder)	17	MGM
1967	Wine Women & Song (as Ben Colder)	44	MGM
1968	The Best of Ben Colder (as Ben Colder)	44	MGM
1968	Harper Valley P.T.A. (Later That Same Day) (as Ben Colder)	—	MGM
1969	Warm and Wooley	—	MGM
1969	Have One On (as Ben Colder)	—	MGM
1970	Big Ben Colder Wild Again (as Ben Colder)	—	MGM
1971	Live and Loaded (as Ben Colder)	—	MGM
1972	Warming Up to Colder (as Ben Colder)	—	MGM
1973	The Wacky World (as Ben Colder)	—	MGM

=== Singles ===
Year	Single	Chart Positions				Album
Year	Single	US Country	US	CAN Country	CAN	Album
1955	"Are You Satisfied?"	—	95	—	—	singles only
1958	"I Found Me an Angel"	—	—	—	—	singles only
1958	"The Purple People Eater"	—	1	—	1	singles only
1958	"The Chase"	—	—	—	—	singles only
1958	"Santa Claus Meets the Purple People Eater"	—	—	—	—	singles only
1959	"Sweet Chile"	—	70	—	—	singles only
1959	"Luke The Spook" / "My Only Treasure"	—	—	—	—	singles only
1959	"Pygmy Love" / "Careless Hands"	—	—	—	—	singles only
1962	"That's My Pa"	1	51	—	11	That's My Pa and That's My Ma
1962	"Don't Go Near the Eskimos" (as Ben Colder)	18	62	—	—	Spoofing the Big Ones
1963	"Hello Wall No. 2" (as Ben Colder)	30	131	—	—	Ben Colder
1963	"Still No. 2" (as Ben Colder)	—	98	—	—	Ben Colder
1963	"Detroit City No. 2" (as Ben Colder)	—	90	—	—	Spoofing the Big Ones
1964	"Blue Guitar"	33	—	—	—	The Very Best
1966	"I'll Leave the Singin' to the Bluebirds"	34	—	—	—	single only
1966	"Almost Persuaded No. 2" (as Ben Colder)	6	58	—	53	Big Ben Strikes Again
1966	"Tonight's the Night My Angel's Halo Fell"	70	—	—	—	single only
1968	"Tie a Tiger Down"	22	—	—	—	Warm and Wooley
1968	"Harper Valley P.T.A. (Later That Same Day)" (as Ben Colder)	24	67	18	82	Harper Valley P.T.A. (Later That Same Day)
1969	"Little Green Apples No. 2" (as Ben Colder)	65	—	—	—	Harper Valley P.T.A. (Later That Same Day)
1969	"I Remember Loving You"	52	—	—	—	Warm and Wooley
1969	"The One Man Band"	63	—	—	—	single only
1970	"Big Sweet John" (as Ben Colder)	—	—	47	—	Have One On
1971	"Fifteen Beers Ago" (as Ben Colder)	50	—	—	—	Live and Loaded

== Filmography ==
Year	Title	Role	Notes
1950	Rocky Mountain	Kay Rawlins	
1951	Apache Drums	Townsman	Uncredited
1951	Inside the Walls of Folsom Prison	Chick Fullis	Uncredited
1951	Little Big Horn	Quince	
1951	Fort Worth	Outrider	Uncredited
1951	Distant Drums	Pvt. Jessup	Uncredited
1952	Bugles in the Afternoon	Gen. George Armstrong Custer	Uncredited
1952	High Noon	Ben Miller	
1952	Hellgate	Neill Price	
1952	Cattle Town	Miller	
1952	The Lusty Men	Gambler with Buster	Uncredited
1952	Toughest Man in Arizona	Army Officer	Uncredited
1952	Sky Full of Moon	Balladeer	Voice
1953	Texas Bad Man	Mack	
1954	The Boy from Oklahoma	Pete Martin	
1954	Rose Marie	Corporal	Uncredited
1954	Arrow in the Dust	Trooper	Uncredited
1954	Johnny Guitar	Posseman	Uncredited
1954	Seven Brides for Seven Brothers	Minor Role	Uncredited
1955	Man Without a Star	Latigo	
1955	Trial	Butteridge	Uncredited
1955	The Second Greatest Sex	Silas - Jones City Leader	
1956	Giant	Gabe Target	
1956	The Black Whip	Bill Lassater	
1957	The Oklahoman	Cowboy	Uncredited
1957	Trooper Hook	Cooter Brown	
1957	Ride a Violent Mile	Jonathan Long	
1958	Terror in a Texas Town	Baxter	Uncredited
1959	Rio Bravo	Cowboy	(scenes deleted)
1963	Hootenanny Hoot	Himself	
1966	Country Boy	Sheb Wooley	
1967	The War Wagon	Snyder	
1976	The Outlaw Josey Wales	Travis Cobb	
1986	Silverado	Cavalry Sergeant	
1986	Uphill All the Way	Anson Sudro	
1986	Hoosiers	Cletus Summers	
1988	Purple People Eater	Harry Skinner	
