= Billy Ray Hearn =

American music executive (1929–2015)

- Born: April 26, 1929
- Died: April 15, 2015 (aged 85)
- Occupations: Founder of Myrrh Records and Sparrow Records

Billy Ray Hearn (April 26, 1929 – April 15, 2015) was the founder and chairman of the Capitol Christian Music Group (formerly EMI Christian Music Group) the world's largest Christian music label.

In 1954, Billy Ray Hearn graduated from Baylor University with a degree in church music.

In 1972, Hearn started Myrrh Records, one of the first labels devoted to contemporary Christian music, at Word Inc., the label of Amy Grant. In 1976, he formed his own label, Sparrow Records, the label behind musicians Keith Green, John Michael Talbot, and Margaret Becker.

In 1992, Hearn sold Sparrow to EMI Music, the label of artists including Steven Curtis Chapman and BeBe & CeCe Winans.

Hearn was a member of the Gospel Music Hall of Fame and in 1999 received the Lifetime Achievement Award from the Gospel Music Association. Hearn was also founder and sponsor of the biannual Hearn Symposium on Christian Music at Baylor University. He died in 2015 of complications from heart disease.
