= Wolverton Mountain =

1962 Claude King song

Single by Claude King

from the album Meet Claude King
- B-side: "Little Bitty Heart"
- Released: March 1962
- Genre: Country
- Length: 2:59
- Label: Columbia
- Songwriters: Merle Kilgore; Claude King
- Producers: Don Law; Frank Jones

Claude King singles chronology
"The Comancheros" (1961)	"Wolverton Mountain" (1962)	"The Burning of Atlanta" (1962)

"Wolverton Mountain" is a country music song and 1962 crossover hit that established Claude King's career as an American country singer-songwriter. The song was a cover of the original version by Merle Kilgore, which was based on a real person named Clifton Clowers (Kilgore's uncle). Clowers lived on Woolverton Mountain (the spelling was changed for the song), located 4 miles (6.4 km) north of Center Ridge, Arkansas, 50 miles (80 km) north of Little Rock. The song spent nine weeks at the top of the Billboard country chart in the United States in June and July 1962. A crossover hit, "Wolverton Mountain" reached number six on the Billboard Hot 100 pop chart and number three on the easy listening chart. In Canada, it was number one for three weeks and in the top 10 for 7 weeks.

== Premise ==
The song's storyline opens with the recounting of a legendary warning to the listener not to "go on Wolverton Mountain", as its inhabitant Clifton Clowers, who is "handy with a gun and a knife", poses a lethal threat to anyone who tries to approach his beautiful daughter, whose "tender lips are sweeter than honey". If a stranger attempts to enter, Clowers is alerted by "the bears and the birds". The narrator has decided to defy Clowers and climb the mountain despite the acknowledged danger. What will eventually happen to him is not revealed in the lyric, but the positive tone suggests optimism.

== Clifton Clowers ==
Clifton T. Clowers was born on October 30, 1891, at Center Ridge, Arkansas, son of Thomas Jefferson Clowers and Mary Prince Clowers. In July 1919, he married Esther Bell. He was a veteran of World War I and a deacon in the Mountain View Baptist Church. He was immortalized by the success of "Wolverton Mountain". He lived most of his life on a small farm located on the northern edge of Woolverton Mountain. According to one of his grandchildren, Clowers wished that Kilgore had not suggested in the song that he threatened his daughter's suitors with a gun and a knife, saying, "I never used those tools for that purpose, I just used them to hunt and whittle.”

On his 100th birthday, Clowers was visited by both writers of the song, King and Kilgore. Clowers died at the age of 102 on August 15, 1994, at his home in Clinton, Arkansas, and was buried at the Woolverton Mountain Cemetery.

== Covers, later recordings, and answer versions ==
Country singer Dickey Lee, who was still emerging on the music scene at the time, covered the song just months after it was released.

An answer song, "(I'm the Girl from) Wolverton Mountain", was recorded by Jo Ann Campbell, released in August 1962 ("Yes, I'm the girl from Wolverton Mountain / I wish someone would make me their wife"), and hit the Billboard charts (number 38 pop, number 24 country, number 10 adult contemporary). The song also achieved popularity in Australia in a version by Dorothy Baker.

Nat King Cole covered the song for his 1962 album Ramblin' Rose.

Bing Crosby recorded the song for his 1965 album Bing Crosby Sings the Great Country Hits. Jerry Lee Lewis also recorded a version of the song that year.

In 1962, Australian country and western singer Kevin Shegog recorded the song, and it was a popular hit in Australia.

In 1966, Olle Adolphson scored a hit Swedish-language version, with lyrics by himself as "Skattlösa bergen", at Svensktoppen. In 1988, Lasse Stefanz recorded the song with these lyrics.

In 1975, Roman Stewart recorded a reggae version, dubbed by King Tubby as the "Wolverton Mountain version" by Treasure Isle All Stars. In 1994, Josey Wales made a dancehall version in "Cowboy Style".

The song was also parodied by Marty Cooper (as "El Clod") in a version called "Tijuana Border (Wolverton Mountain)". It reached number 111 on the Billboard Bubbling Under chart in the fall of 1962.

The Nitty Gritty Dirt Band, then recording under the name the Dirt Band, released a version of the song on their 1979 album An American Dream. In 1985, inspired by the Dirt Band's rendition of the song, a cable television program in Summit County, Colorado, featured Jim Rianoshek, a restaurateur, portraying a character named Clifton Clowers, who promoted a fictional ski area called Wolverton Mountain, "where the snow is so deep that it is the home of periscope skiing, and the cost of a lift ticket depends on your line of credit."

Hank Williams Jr. mentioned Clifton Clowers in a track titled "If the South Woulda Won" on his album Wild Streak (1988).

Great Plains recorded the song in 1997. Writer Merle Kilgore praised Great Plains' version, saying that it was the first time since King's original that the "magic" had been recaptured.

== Chart performance ==
Chart (1962)	Peak position
Canada (CHUM Chart)	1
US Hot Country Songs (Billboard)	1
US Billboard Hot 100	6
U.S. Billboard Easy Listening	3
