= Kay Kyser's Greatest Hits =

Compilation album by the former Kay Kyser Orchestra
- Released: 1962
- Recorded: August 25, 29 and September 7, 1961
- Studio: Capitol Studios
- Genre: Big band
- Length: 35:03
- Label: Capitol Records, The Star Line
- Producer: Lee Gillette

Kay Kyser's Greatest Hits is a 1962 compilation album featuring music made famous by American bandleader Kay Kyser released by Capitol Records. While Kyser himself was not present at the recording session, former members of his orchestra Harry Babbitt, Mike Douglas, Trudy Erwin, Ish Kabibble, Jack Martin, Sully Mason, Ginny Simms, and Gloria Wood reunited to make re-recordings of their original Columbia Records hits.

In addition, satirist Stan Freberg impersonated Kay Kyser's voice to recreate the song introductions.

The 1962 re-recorded track for "Praise the Lord and Pass the Ammunition" was featured in the 2018 video game Fallout 76.

== Recording ==
The album was recorded over a period of two weeks at the Capitol Records Studios in Hollywood, California from August to September 1961. For the Capitol Records sessions, of the credited personnel, Babbitt, Douglas, Erwin, Ish Kabibble, Martin, Mason, Simms, and Woods, all had previously recorded with the Kay Kyser orchestra. However some members substituted for others even if they were not present for the original Columbia Records session on a particular track.

In an interview with author Steven Beasley, the son of Harry Babbitt, Chris Babbitt, recalled seeing additional bandmembers from the old sessions, but was too young at the time to remember names. He also recalled seeing "one of his idols" Stan Freberg who at the time was recording his album The United States of America Volume One down the hall and who would also provide the Kay Kyser impersonation on the tracks.

Kay Kyser did not object to Capitol Records making an album nor the impersonation, but he had no desire to recreate his performances after his retirement from show business in 1950 to dedicate himself to Christian Science. At the time, Capitol had already issued several similar long-playing albums, inviting bandleaders of 30s and 40s who "welcomed the chance to recreate their hits and make some extra money" in Hi-Fi and in Stereo. Bandleaders like Stan Kenton (Kenton in Hi-Fi), Benny Goodman (B.G. in Hi-Fi), Harry James (Harry James in Hi-Fi) and so on added themselves to the Capitol Records catalog.

Hair and Friedwald note that Billy May served an uncredited role as the orchestra conductor for the Capitol sessions. May had previously recorded a similar "ghost session" recreating the Jimmie Lunceford sound, who had died in 1947, for the 1957 Capitol album Jimmie Lunceford in Hi-Fi.

Professional ratings
Review scores
Source	Rating
Billboard magazine	4/5 stars
Allmusic	3/5 stars

A contemporary 1962 review from Billboard noted the Kyser album had "Strong Sales Potential" and it was for "the fans of the erstwhile professor of the college of musical knowledge, this re-creation of the Kay Kyser sound is made to order...a suitable memorial to one of the top names of the big band era."

Greg Adams of Allmusic noted "The recording quality is much better than that of the originals, which were cut in the '30s and '40s, but the performances aren't as spirited or as sharp." The Hair biography noted "Freberg's imitation of the Ol' Professor was outstanding. Many people who heard the record thought they were hearing Kay's voice, and the sound of the Kyser band was captured perfectly." The Beasley biography noted "The music was recorded in the then new 'Full Dimensional Stereo' sound, and the arrangements, though similar to the originals, had a slick, lush quality that I suppose was considered contemporary...The singing was still very good, though it's clear, particularly on Ish's segments of 'Fishies', that the voices had aged somewhat."

== Track listing ==
The recording dates were provided through the Hair biography.

No.	Title	Music	Recording date	Length
1.	"Ma! He's Making Eyes at Me"	Sully Mason (vocal), Ish Kabibble (trumpet solo)	August 29, 1961	3:00
2.	"Woody Woodpecker"	Gloria Wood and Harry Babbitt (vocals)	August 25, 1961	3:08
3.	"Why Don't We Do This More Often?"	Ginny Simms and Harry Babbitt (vocals)	August 29, 1961	2:50
4.	"Three Little Fishies"	Harry Babbitt, Ish Kabibble, Sully Mason, Ginny Simms (vocals)	August 29, 1961	3:08
5.	"The Old Lamp-Lighter"	Mike Douglas and group (vocals)	September 7, 1961	3:20
6.	"Praise the Lord and Pass the Ammunition"	Harry Babbitt and chorus (vocals)	August 25, 1961	2:33
7.	"Who Wouldn't Love You"	Harry Babbitt and Trudy Erwin (vocals)	August 25, 1961	2:36
8.	"Playmates"	Sully Mason and Trio (vocals)	August 29, 1961	3:00
9.	"Jingle Jangle Jingle"	Trudy Erwin, Harry Babbitt and chorus (vocals)	August 25, 1961	3:15
10.	"Strip Polka"	Jack Martin and chorus (vocals)	September 7, 1961	2:45
11.	"Pushin' Sand"		September 7, 1961	2:41
12.	"(I’ve Grown So Lonesome) Thinking of You"	Harry Babbitt (vocal)	August 25, 1961	2:47

Unissued
No.	Title	Writer(s)	Recording date	Length
13.	"Holiday for Strings"	David Rose	September 7, 1961	unknown

== 1989 reissue ==
The album was reissued in 1989 on compact disc and cassette tape and was digitally remastered by Larry Walsh at the Capitol Recording Studios. The reissue notably removed most of Stan Freberg's narration imitating Kay Kyser which was previously overdubbed on 4 of the tracks. For the introductions below, the portions in brackets have been removed in the 1989 reissue, but are present on the original 1962 release.

- Ma! He's Making Eyes at Me – "Oh ma, she's making eyes at me!...[Well looky here, mama's boy sassy Sully Mason!]"
- Three Little Fishies – "Three little fishies in the itty bitty pool...[Sully, Ginny, Ish Kabibble, and oopy doopy doo, Babbitt!]"
- Playmates – "Oh playmates! Come out and play with me!...[Well here's Sully Mason and later little Audrey and her playmates.]"
- (I’ve Grown So Lonesome) Thinking of You – "...[Here's our theme song "Thinking of You". A beautiful thought, beautifully expressed by Harry Babbitt.]"

The Beasley biography also identifies Kay Kyser's voice as the one shouting "Ahh, take it off Queenie!" in the introduction of the original 1942 issue of "Strip Polka", but the Hair biography does not note if Stan Freberg recreated this portion on the 1962 track.

== Personnel ==
- Billy May (uncredited) – conductor
- George Duning (uncredited) – arranger
- Stan Freberg – narrator
- Lee Gillette – producer
- Ish Kabibble – trumpet and vocals
- Jack Martin – soprano sax and vocals
- Harry Babbitt – vocals
- Mike Douglas – vocals
- Ginny Simms – vocals
- Sully Mason – vocals
- Trudy Erwin – vocals
- Gloria Wood – vocals
- Jim Jonson – cover art

== Bibliography ==
- Beasley, Steven (2009). Kay Kyser - The Old Professor of Swing! - America's Forgotten Superstar. Richland Creek Publishing. ISBN 978-0-615-31983-4.
- Hair, Raymond D.; Wölfer, Jürgen (2011). Thinking of You - The Story of Kay Kyser. BearManor Media. ISBN 978-1-59393-636-5.
