= Kay Kyser's Kollege of Musical Knowledge =

American radio and television program

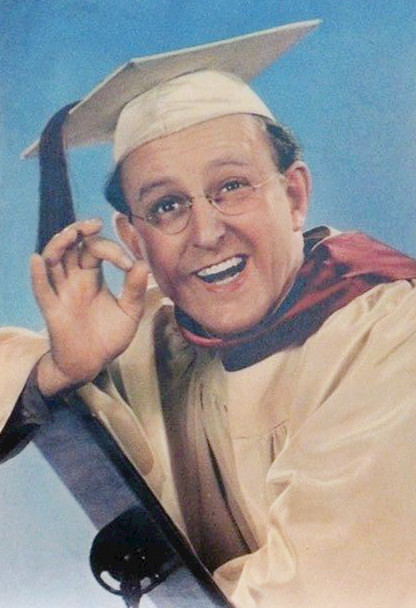
- Kay Kyser in cap and gown (1942)
- Other names: Kay Kyser's Kampus Klass
- Genre: Musical quiz
- Country of origin: United States
- Language: English
- Home station: WGN
- Syndicates: Mutual; NBC; ABC
- TV adaptations: Kay Kyser's Kollege of Musical Knowledge; College of Musical Knowledge
- Starring: Kay Kyser
- Announcer: Ken Niles; Bud Hiestand; Vern Smith; Bill Forman; Jack McCoy
- Written by: Fran Coughlin
- Directed by: Ed Cashman; John Cleary; William Warwick; Harry Sax
- Produced by: Frank O'Connor
- Original release: February 1, 1939 – July 2, 1949
- Sponsored by: American Tobacco Company; Colgate-Palmolive; Pillsbury

Kay Kyser's Kollege of Musical Knowledge is an American old-time radio musical quiz program starring Kay Kyser. It was broadcast on Mutual, NBC, and ABC beginning on February 1, 1938, and ending on July 29, 1949.

== Background ==
In the latter half of the 1930s, leaders of big bands sought ways to differentiate their groups from others who played similar music. Successful variations on the standard format of just playing one song after another could quickly move bands from "being merely late-hour fillers" without sponsors to having sponsored broadcasts in better time slots. Tommy Dorsey began featuring amateur musicians, Benny Goodman moved his trio and quartet into the spotlight, and Kay Kyser added a quiz component. Some of the changes were less innovation than adaptation. An article in the trade publication Billboard noted that Dorsey's airing of amateurs followed the example of Major Bowes, and Kyser's contest was a variation on the Professor Quiz program.

In October 1937, Kyser began including the Kollege as a segment in his Monday night broadcasts from the Blackhawk restaurant in Chicago, Illinois, via radio station WGN.

Audience participation in the program occurred in two ways. Listeners were invited to submit questions to Kyser, with selected submissions being used on the program. They also could send in answers to questions posed on the air. One episode in December 1937 resulted in more than 2,000 letters being sent to the program. By mid-January 1938, the number of letters from listeners had exceeded 75,000.

== Personnel ==
Besides Kyser, the show's personnel included singers Trudy Erwin, Julie Conway, Gloria Wood, Lucy Ann Polk, Mike Douglas, Sully Mason, the King Sisters, Georgia Carroll (Kyser's wife), Harry Babbitt and Ginny Simms. Other regulars were pianist Lyman Gandee, trumpeter Bobby Guy, and Merwyn Bogue (better known as Ish Kabibble). Fran Coughlin was the writer. Announcers were Ken Niles, Bud Hiestand, Vern Smith, Bill Forman, and Jack McCoy. Rex Koury was the organist, and Frank O'Connor was the producer. Directors included Ed Cashman, John Cleary, William Warwick, and Harry Sax.

A review in Billboard in 1947 attributed the program's success more to Kyser than to its format. Paul Ackerman wrote: "In fact, the Old Professor's most noteworthy characteristic is ebullience. He's got it to a degree that makes other facets of the program secondary."

== Networks and sponsors ==
=== Mutual ===
On February 1, 1938, Kyser's program gained a sponsor, a network, a new location, and a new title. The American Tobacco Company began sponsoring Kollege, which until then had been a sustaining program. While the program remained on WGN, it was also carried on the Mutual Broadcasting System. At the same time, its site was moved from the Blackhawk to WGN's 600-seat studio. The Chicago Sunday Tribune reported in its January 30, 1938, issue that the show's title would become Kay Kyser's Kampus Klass.

Eight members of the studio audience were selected by random drawing to participate in the quizzes in each broadcast. The grand prize was $50, with another $50 going to other contestants.

=== NBC ===
The program moved to New York on March 30, 1938, replacing Your Hollywood Parade on NBC. It resumed using the title Kay Kyser's Kollege of Musical Knowledge as it began broadcasting from NBC's Radio City headquarters. Kyser reinforced the theme by wearing a cap and gown during broadcasts. American Tobacco Company continued to sponsor the program until 1945, when a cigarette shortage caused it to cut back on advertising and Colgate-Palmolive became the sponsor. The show's run on NBC ended on June 26, 1948.

=== ABC ===
On November 4, 1948, Kollege moved to daytime on ABC. It ran until July 29, 1949, with Pillsbury sponsoring.

== Television ==
Kyser took the program to television on December 1, 1949, on NBC, where it ran weekly until December 28, 1950. The format was essentially the same as that of the radio program, including Kyser's wearing a cap and gown. Kyser, Douglas, and Kabibble were the only entertainers carried over from the radio version. Other regulars were Liza Palmer, Sue Bennett, Diane Sinclair, and Ken Spaulding. Ben Grauer and Roy Marshall were the announcers. The program was sponsored by Ford. It originated from WNBT in New York City. Guests on the show included Mindy Carson and Bill Stern.

A review in The New York Times said that the program was "basically straight radio", with little adaptation to the new medium. The review also questioned Kyser's emphasis on the show's quiz elements when the orchestra and singers had "some excellent talent of which he has every reason to be proud."

The program returned to TV on July 4, 1954, again on NBC, and ran until September 12, 1954. Tennessee Ernie Ford was the host, and the title used the traditional spelling, College of Musical Knowledge. Frank De Vol's orchestra provided instrumental music, and the Cheerleaders Quintet sang. Jack Narz was the announcer.
