= Swing Fever =

1943 film by Tim Whelan

- theatrical poster
- Directed by: Tim Whelan
- Written by: Story: Matt Brooks; Joseph Hoffman; Screenplay: Nat Perrin; Warren Wilson
- Produced by: Irving Starr
- Starring: Kay Kyser
- Cinematography: Charles Rosher
- Edited by: Ferris Webster
- Music by: George Stoll (uncredited)
- Distributed by: Metro-Goldwyn-Mayer
- Release date: November 1, 1943 (US)
- Running time: 79 minutes
- Country: United States
- Language: English

Swing Fever is a 1943 American musical comedy film directed by Tim Whelan. Kay Kyser plays an ambitious music composer, also gifted with a hypnotic "evil eye", who gets mixed up with promoting a boxer. The film also features Marilyn Maxwell, William Gargan, Nat Pendleton and Lena Horne. Amid the credited music and boxing-world cameos many other familiar faces can be glimpsed: Tommy Dorsey, Harry James, Mike Mazurki, Mantan Moreland, and a young Ava Gardner.

== Cast ==
- Kay Kyser as Lowell Blackford
- Marilyn Maxwell as Ginger Gray
- William Gargan as "Waltzy" Malone
- Nat Pendleton as "Killer" Kennedy
- Lena Horne as herself
- Curt Bois as Nick Sirocco
- Morris Ankrum as Dan Conlon
- Andrew Tombes as Dr. Clyde L. Star
- Max "Slapsie Maxie" Rosenbloom as Rags
- Clyde Fillmore as Mr. Nagen
- Pamela Blake as Lois, Nagen's secretary
- Lou Nova as Kid Mandell
- Jack Roper as Sledgehammer Carson
- Harry Babbitt as himself
- Sully Mason as himself
- Ish Kabibble as himself
- Tommy Dorsey as himself
- Harry James as himself
- Jean Veloz nee Phelps aka Jean Davi as swing dancer, One Girl and Two Boys number
- Lennie Smith as swing dancer, One Girl and Two Boys number
- Don Gallagher as swing dancer, One Girl and Two Boys number
