= Around the World (1943 film) =

1943 American comedy film produced and directed by Allan Dwan

- Theatrical poster for the film
- Directed by: Allan Dwan; Harry Scott (assistant)
- Written by: Ralph Spence
- Produced by: Allan Dwan
- Starring: Kay Kyser and his band Mischa Auer; Joan Davis; Marcy McGuire; Wally Brown; Alan Carney
- Cinematography: Russell Metty
- Edited by: Theron Warth
- Music by: Score: C. Bakaleinikoff; Songs: Jimmy McHugh (music); Harold Adamson (lyrics)
- Production company: RKO Radio Pictures
- Release date: November 24, 1943 (US)
- Running time: 81 minutes
- Budget: $700,000

Around the World is a 1943 American musical comedy film produced and directed by Allan Dwan from an original screenplay by Ralph Spence. RKO Radio Pictures premiered the film at the Globe Theater in New York on November 24, 1943. The film has a large cast, and stars Kay Kyser and his band, Mischa Auer, Joan Davis, Marcy McGuire, Wally Brown, and Alan Carney. The picture follows Kyser and his troupe on a tour of U.S. military bases around the world. The film includes one-liners, sight-gags, double-talk, running gags, and other comedy performed by Kyser's band.

== Plot ==
The film opens with this text: “To every battlefront men and women of the United Nations fight—Civilians from all walks of life are contributing their honest efforts to the struggle. Among these, the brightest stars of Hollywood and Broadway do their bit—We welcome you to come along on this tour of the global conflict. So, stand by! Here we are… Australia!” Cut to the group concluding a performance with Waltzing Matilda. The troops join in. Kyser introduces members of his troupe, including Mischa Auer, Joan Davis and Georgia Carroll, who blows the boys a kiss. They all sing “Roodle-ee-doo” and start “Great News is in the Making”, their signature farewell.

Kyser hands out the visas for India as they load the plane, and he is approached by a stranded American teen-ager, Marcy McGuire, who pleads with Kyser for him to take her with them. Kyser refuses, but this does not deter Marcy, who stows away on the Clipper. When she is discovered, the American authorities in New Delhi insist she be returned to Australia, but Kyser offers to take responsibility for her.

Meanwhile, Kyser and Auer have become obsessed with obtaining historical relics from the places they visit. They make a bet on who can get the best collection. On the plane to Chongqing, the troupe sings Roodle-ee-doo. Auer procures a ring that supposedly belonged to the Borgias, not realizing that it contains a secret Nazi document. At the performance that night, a romantic duet is followed by Marcy and the brass section jiving to “The Moke from Shomoken”. Everyone joins in to begin “Great News is in the Making” as planes flown by Chinese and American pilots fill the sky overhead.

Auer is approached by a beautiful Countess and inadvertently provokes a duel. Kyser, who has been following Auer in disguise, electrifies Auer's foil, which knocks his opponent out.

The band moves on to Cairo, where Babbitt performs a comic number “I've Got a Secret Weapon” and Davis and others sing, “They Just Chopped Down the Old Apple Tree”. The Nazis get the ring but Auer has removed a map from the secret compartment. Kyser declares they must take it to the Army, throws the ring away and calls off the bet.

In Tunisia, they must travel through desert country by jeep and truck. Their audience include a large number of nurses and WACs. Two of them win prizes (wristwatches) for guessing the songs played by Ishkabibble on his crazy musical instrument. Georgia and Harry sing “Don't believe everything you dream…” .

On to Algiers, Casablanca and finally Monrovia, where they get mail—except for Marcy. The general asks to see her. Her father died aboard a transport. He gives her a letter from the President and her father's Purple Heart. He says the medal and speeches don't help much, but she has to hold on.

She tells Kyser she'll never sing again and flees, crying, through the camp and into the General's arms. Kyser starts the introduction and she runs to the stage. For the first time, we hear “Great News is in the Making” in its entirety.

== Cast ==
(cast list per AFI database)*

- Kay Kyser as himself
- Mischa Auer as himself
- Joan Davis as herself
- Marcy McGuire as herself
- Wally Brown as Pilot of the clipper
- Alan Carney as Joe Gimpus
- Kay Kyser's band as themselves
- Ish Kabibble as himself
- Georgia Carroll as herself
- Harry Babbitt as himself

== Production ==
In April 1943, it was announced that Alan Dwan would be handling both the directing and producing responsibilities for the pictures. At the same time, Jimmy McHugh and Harald Adamson were selected to write the songs for the film, and Kay Kyser was cast as the lead. The working title of the film was Keep Em Singing. Mischa Auer, Joan Davis, and Marcy McGuire were added to the cast the following week, in early May. On May 14 it was announced that Barbara Hale, Rosemary LaPlanche, and Gloria Warren would be joining the cast, followed two weeks later by Patti Brilie and Margaret Landry. At the beginning of June Ivan Lebedeff was cast as Menlo, and Jadine Wong and Li Sun joined the cast in late June.

The film began production the last week of May 1943, and lasted through the first week in August. Originally scheduled to be shot at RKO Studios in Hollywood, due to scheduling conflicts the production was moved to the Pathe studios in Culver City. In July it was announced that selected members of the cast would preview the film for military personnel at 20 different military installations prior to the film's release to the general public. By early September, the footage of the film was being edited at the studio.

Two of the songs from the film, "Candlelight and Wine" and "Don't Believe Everything You Dream", were some of the most popular songs in the United States by the middle of November. Many of the performers in the film participated in a Thanksgiving morning performance for the troops on NBC radio. RKO originally scheduled a preview of the film for December 6, 1943 at their projection room on Ninth Avenue in New York City, but in late November moved the preview up to November 23. On November 22, it was announced that the film would be opening at the Globe Theater in New York on November 24, where it opened on schedule. Shortly after its opening, the National Legion of Decency rated the film as "unobjectionable for general patronage".

== Reception ==
The Film Daily gave the film a mostly positive review, calling it a "... world of entertainment to offer those who relish lively rhythms." The New York Times' Bosley Crowther did not think highly of the film, saying that the "... music, gags and slapstick designed to entertain our troops ..." was not of a high enough caliber to satisfy the discerning film viewer. He called the humor, as supplied by Auer and Davis, was "straight off the cob", and that the acting of Carroll and McGuire was shallow. He specifically singled out his distaste for the performance of Kyser. Harrison's Reports called the film "moderately entertaining" with a meaningless story.

Motion Picture Daily gave the film a positive review, saying it served "... up a sparkling concoction overflowing with small music and comedy." They applauded the work of Kyser, Auer, Davis, Brown and Carney. The Motion Picture Herald enjoyed the film, in spite of the lack of plot. They applauded the musical numbers and site gags, and highlighted the work of Kyser, Auer, Davis, Carney and Brown.
