= Hobart Cavanaugh =

American actor (1886–1950)

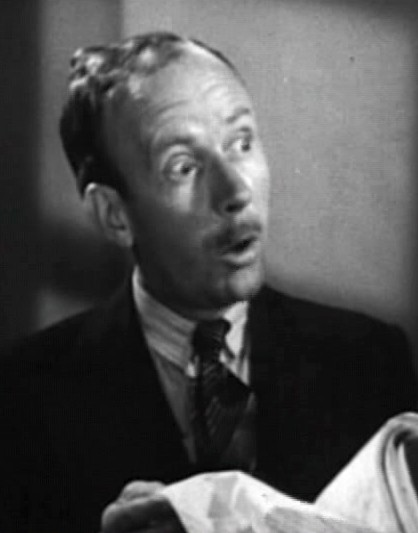
- in the film I Cover the Waterfront (1933)
- Born: September 22, 1886; Virginia City, Nevada, U.S.
- Died: April 26, 1950 (aged 63); Woodland Hills, California, U.S.
- Years active: 1928–1950
- Spouse(s): Florence Cavanaugh; 1 child

Hobart Cavanaugh (September 22, 1886 – April 26, 1950) was an American character actor in films and on stage.

== Biography ==
Cavanaugh was born in Virginia City, Nevada, on September 22, 1886. He attended the University of California, then worked in vaudeville, teaming with Walter Catlett at some point. He appeared in numerous Broadway productions, including the original 1919 musical Irene and the long-running 1948 musical As the Girls Go.

He made his film debut in San Francisco Nights (1928). Over the next few years he established himself as a supporting actor, and although many of his roles were small and received no film credit, he played more substantial roles in films such as I Cover the Waterfront (1933) and Mary Stevens, M.D. (1933). By the mid-1930s, he was appearing in more prestigious productions, such as A Midsummer Night's Dream (1935), Captain Blood (1935), Wife vs. Secretary (1936) and A Letter to Three Wives (1949). He continued playing small, often comical roles until the end of his life, mostly as downtrodden or henpecked men. By the end of his life, he had appeared in more than 180 films.

== Death ==
Cavanaugh suffered from late-stage stomach cancer while filming Stella (1950). He could not eat and collapsed twice on the set but was determined to see his final performance through. He died following an operation at the Motion Picture & Television Country House and Hospital in Woodland Hills, California.

== Partial filmography ==
- San Francisco Nights (1928) as Tommie
- State Fair (1933) as Professor Fred Coin – Hog Judge (uncredited)
- Lilly Turner (1933) as Earle (scenes deleted)
- A Study in Scarlet (1933) as Thompson – Innkeeper (uncredited)
- I Cover the Waterfront (1933) as One Punch McCoy
- Gold Diggers of 1933 (1933) as Dog Salesman (uncredited)
- Private Detective 62 (1933) as Harcourt S. Burns
- The Mayor of Hell (1933) as Mr. Gorman
- Mary Stevens, M.D. (1933) as Alf Simmons
- Headline Shooter (1933) as Happy
- No Marriage Ties (1933) as Smith
- The Devil's Mate (1933) as Parkhurst
- Goodbye Again (1933) as Mr. Clayton
- Bureau of Missing Persons (1933) as Mr. Harris (uncredited)
- Too Much Harmony (1933) as Piano Tuner (uncredited)
- Footlight Parade (1933) as Title-Thinker-Upper (uncredited)
- My Woman (1933) as Mr. Miller
- Broadway Through a Keyhole (1933) as Peanuts Dinwiddie
- From Headquarters (1933) as Muggs Manton
- Havana Widows (1933) as Mr. Otis
- Convention City (1933) as Wendell Orchard
- Death Watch (1933)
- Moulin Rouge (1934) as Drunk
- Easy to Love (1934) as Hotel Desk Clerk
- Hi, Nellie! (1934) as Fullerton
- Dark Hazard (1934) as George Mayhew
- I've Got Your Number (1934) as Happy Dooley
- Mandalay (1934) as Purser (uncredited)
- Fashion Follies of 1934 (1934) as Inventor on Ship (uncredited)
- Wonder Bar (1934) as Drunk (uncredited)
- Jimmy the Gent (1934) as Fake Worthingham
- A Modern Hero (1934) as Henry Mueller
- Harold Teen (1934) as Pop
- A Very Honorable Guy (1934) as Benny
- Merry Wives of Reno (1934) as Derwent
- The Key (1934, aka High Peril) as Homer, Tennant's Aide
- Now I'll Tell (1934) as Freddie Stanton
- Madame du Barry (1934) as Professor de la Vauguyon
- Housewife (1934) as George
- Kansas City Princess (1934) as Alderman Sam Warren
- A Lost Lady (1934) as Robert
- I Sell Anything (1934) as Stooge
- The St. Louis Kid (1934) as Richardson
- The Firebird (1934) as Emile – Brandt's Valet
- I Am a Thief (1934) as Daudet
- Bordertown (1935) as Harry
- Wings in the Dark (1935) as Mac
- While the Patient Slept (1935) as Eustace
- Husband's Holiday (1935, Short) as Meek Husband
- Don't Bet on Blondes (1935) as Philbert O. Slemp
- Broadway Gondolier (1935) as Music Critic Gilmore
- We're in the Money (1935) as Max
- Page Miss Glory (1935) as Joe Bonner
- I Live for Love (1935) as Townsend
- A Midsummer Night's Dream (1935) as Philostrate – Master of Revels to Theseus
- Dr. Socrates (1935) as Stevens
- Captain Blood (1935) as Dr. Bronson
- Steamboat Round the Bend (1935)
- Two Against the World (1936) as Tippy Mantus
- The Lady Consents (1936) as Mr. Yardley
- Wife vs. Secretary (1936) as Joe
- Colleen (1936) as Noggin
- The Golden Arrow (1936) as DeWolfe
- Love Begins at Twenty (1936) as Jacob 'Jake' Buckley
- Stage Struck (1936) as Wayne
- Cain and Mabel (1936) as Milo
- Here Comes Carter (1936) as Mel Winter
- Love Letters of a Star (1936) as Chester Blodgett
- Three Smart Girls (1936) as Wilbur Lamb
- Sing Me a Love Song (1936) as Mr. Barton (uncredited)
- Mysterious Crossing (1936) as Ned J. Stebbins
- Hearts Divided (1936)
- The Mighty Treve (1937) as Mr. Davis
- Girl Overboard (1937) as Joseph L. 'Joe' Gray
- The Great O'Malley (1937) as Pinky Holden
- Night Key (1937) as Petty Louie
- Love in a Bungalow (1937) as Mr. Kester
- Reported Missing (1937) as 'Ab' Steele
- Carnival Queen (1937) as Profesor Silva
- That's My Story (1937) as Sheriff Otis
- A Girl with Ideas (1937)
- Cowboy from Brooklyn (1938) as Mr. 'Pops' Jordan
- Strange Faces (1938) as Expectant Father of 'Six' (uncredited)
- Orphans of the Street (1938) as William Grant
- Idiot's Delight (1939) as Frueheim (uncredited)
- The Adventures of Jane Arden (1939) as Suspect 'Killer'
- Broadway Serenade (1939) as Mr. Ingalls (scenes deleted)
- Never Say Die (1939) as Druggist (uncredited)
- Zenobia (1939) as Mr. Dover
- Rose of Washington Square (1939) as Whitey Boone
- Tell No Tales (1939) as Charlie Daggett
- Naughty but Nice (1939) as Clark's Piano Tuner (uncredited)
- Daughters Courageous (1939) as Tourist (uncredited)
- The House of Fear (1939) as Minor Role (uncredited)
- Career (1939) as Jim Bronson
- I Stole a Million (1939) as Jenkins' Bespectacled Asst. (uncredited)
- Chicken Wagon Family (1939) as Henri Fippany
- The Covered Trailer (1939) as E. L. Beamish
- That's Right – You're Wrong (1939) as Dwight Cook – a Screenwriter
- Reno (1939) as Abe Compass
- A Child is Born (1939) as Mr. West
- The Honeymoon's Over (1939) as Avery Butterfield
- Four Wives (1939) as Mr. Jenkins (uncredited)
- The Ghost Comes Home (1940) as Ambrose Bundy
- Shooting High (1940) as Clem Perkle
- An Angel from Texas (1940) as Mr. Robelink
- You Can't Fool Your Wife (1940) as Potts, GBG & P Vice President
- I Can't Give You Anything But Love, Baby (1940) as Justice of the Peace (uncredited)
- Love, Honor and Oh-Baby! (1940) as 'Gimpy' Darnell
- Stage to Chino (1940) as J. Horatio Boggs
- Hired Wife (1940) as William
- Public Deb No. 1 (1940) as Mr. Schlitz
- Street of Memories (1940) as Mr. Foster
- Charter Pilot (1940) as Horace Cavanaugh
- The Great Plane Robbery (1940) as Homer Pringle
- Santa Fe Trail (1940) as Barber Doyle
- Meet the Chump (1941) as Juniper
- I Wanted Wings (1941) as Mickey
- Horror Island (1941) as Professor Jasper Quinley
- Reaching for the Sun (1941) as Front Office Man
- Thieves Fall Out (1941) as David Tipton
- The Hard-Boiled Canary (1941) as Announcer (uncredited)
- Our Wife (1941) as Shipboard Passenger (uncredited)
- Down in San Diego (1941) as Telegraph Clerk (uncredited)
- Skylark (1941) as Small Man in Subway Car
- Playmates (1941) as Philip Tremble (uncredited)
- A Close Call for Ellery Queen (1942) as Mr. Crandall (uncredited)
- A Tragedy at Midnight (1942) as Charles Miller
- The Remarkable Andrew (1942) as Teller / Witness (uncredited)
- Land of the Open Range (1942) as Pinky Gardner
- My Favorite Spy (1942) as Jules
- Tarzan's New York Adventure (1942) as Hotel Desk Clerk (uncredited)
- Lady in a Jam (1942) as Reporter in Glasses (uncredited)
- Jackass Mail (1942) as Gospel Jones
- The Magnificent Dope (1942) as Albert Gowdy
- Her Cardboard Lover (1942) as Arresting Plainclothesman (uncredited)
- Pittsburgh (1942) as Derelict (uncredited)
- Whistling in Dixie (1942) as Mr. Panky
- Stand By for Action (1942) as Carpenter's Mate 'Chips'
- The Meanest Man in the World (1943) as Mr. Throckmorton (uncredited)
- The Human Comedy (1943) as Drunk at Bar (uncredited)
- Taxi, Mister (1943) as Police Fingerprint Man (uncredited)
- Pilot No. 5 (1943) as Boat Owner (uncredited)
- The Man from Down Under (1943) as Boots
- The Kansan (1943) as Josh Hudkins
- Dangerous Blondes (1943) as Edward E. 'Pop' Philpot
- Sweet Rosie O'Grady (1943) as Clark
- A Scream in the Dark (1943) as Leo Stark
- Gildersleeve on Broadway (1943) as Homer
- Jack London (1943) as Mike, Saloonkeeper
- What a Woman! (1943) as Mailman (uncredited)
- Louisiana Hayride (1944) as Malcolm Cartwright
- Kismet (1944) as Moolah
- San Diego I Love You (1944) as Mr. McGregor (uncredited)
- Guest in the House (1944) as Mr. Blossom (uncredited)
- Together Again (1944) as Perc Mather (uncredited)
- The Captain from Köpenick (1945, also known as I Was a Criminal) as Rosenkrantz, the Treasurer
- Roughly Speaking (1945) as The Teacher (uncredited)
- The House of Fear (1945) Bit Part (uncredited)
- I'll Remember April (1945) as Joe Billings
- Don Juan Quilligan (1945) as Mr. Rostigaff
- Cinderella Jones (1946) as George
- The Spider Woman Strikes Back (1946) as Bill Stapleton
- The Hoodlum Saint (1946) as Antique Clock Dealer (uncredited)
- Our Hearts Were Growing Up (1946) as Mr. Dudley (uncredited)
- Night and Day (1946) as Man in Hospital Hall (uncredited)
- Black Angel (1946) as Jake
- Faithful in My Fashion (1946) as Mr. Wilson
- No Leave, No Love (1946) as Arthur Keenan Kalabush (uncredited)
- Margie (1946) as Mr. Angus MacDuff
- Little Iodine (1946) as Mr. Tremble
- Easy Come, Easy Go (1947) as Higgins – Repair Shop Manager (uncredited)
- Driftwood (1947) as Judge Beckett
- Doctor Jim (1947) as Mayor
- My Girl Tisa (1948) as Sigmund (uncredited)
- The Inside Story (1948) as Mason – bank customer
- Best Man Wins (1948) as Amos
- Up in Central Park (1948) as Mayor Oakley
- A Letter to Three Wives (1949) as Mr. Manleigh
- Stella (1950) as Tim Gross (final film role)
