= Malibu Beach Party =

1940 film by Isadore Freleng

- Title card
- Directed by: I. Freleng
- Story by: Jack Miller
- Produced by: Leon Schlesinger
- Music by: Carl W. Stalling
- Animation by: Gil Turner
- Color process: Technicolor
- Production company: Leon Schlesinger Productions
- Distributed by: Warner Bros. Pictures
- Release date: September 14, 1940
- Running time: 8 min
- Country: United States
- Language: English

Malibu Beach Party is a 1940 American animated comedy short film directed by Isadore Freleng. The short was released on September 14, 1940. It is part of the Merrie Melodies series.

The short is a parody based off the popular radio and TV comedy series, The Jack Benny Program.

== Plot ==
An invitation goes out to Hollywood stars to a beach party at the Malibu beach home of "Jack Bunny", a parody of Jack Benny. Caricatured figures of Benny and his wife Mary Livingstone welcome guests, many attired as characters from their recent film appearances. These include Bob Hope, Bette Davis (dressed as the Virgin Queen from The Private Lives of Elizabeth and Essex), Andy Devine, Benny's co-star in Buck Benny Rides Again, Spencer Tracy (as Henry Morton Stanley in Stanley and Livingstone), Robert Donat as the title character of Goodbye, Mr. Chips. Kay Kyser, in his professorial regalia from radio's Kay Kyser's Kollege of Musical Knowledge, makes a brief appearance.

On Jack Bunny's patio, a caricatured version of George Raft flips a coin as became his trademark in 1932's Scarface, while Clark Gable floats on his back in the ocean, using his oversize ears to paddle backwards. Greta Garbo is also on the surface of the ocean – riding the waves, with her large shoes serving as combination water skis and double surfboards. As Cesar Romero sunbathes on the beach, John Barrymore, quoting Shakespeare's Julius Caesar, "I come to bury Caesar, not to praise him," and then does so with a child's bucket and shovel. A caricature of dour Ned Sparks is berated by a fellow crab, before Fanny Brice's Baby Snooks asks for permission to cover him in sand. When he agrees (relenting only when she cries), she uses a dump truck to unload sand on Sparks.

As caricatures of Adolphe Menjou, Wallace Beery, Rita Gilman, James Cagney, and Ann Sheridan recline on the patio, Jack Bunny announces that he spared no expense in providing entertainment for the party. Gags include Winchester (who's a caricature of Eddie "Rochester" Anderson) and bandleader "Pill" Harris (a caricature of Benny's bandleader Phil Harris), and parodies of Fred Astaire and Ginger Rogers, Deanna Durbin, Mickey Rooney (as Andy Hardy), and Cary Grant.

Jack Bunny announces that "I have a real treat in store for you, the feature attraction of this afternoon, an artist with rare ability and fine technique, a person you all know and love: Mr. Jack Bunny." A parody of Benny's notoriously bad violin-playing follows, as the guests attempt to sneak out during his performance of Träumerei. Winchester fails to do that and is called to Jack.

In the final scene, Jack Bunny continues his performance sitting on Winchester quoting "Someone's going to listen to this." When Jack asks Winchester if this number is beautiful, Winchester quotes "Under the circumstances, yes." Invoking Jack Benny's usual farewell, Jack says "Good night, folks." The scene irises out.

== Sources ==
- Barrier, Michael (2003). "Warner Bros., 1941-1945". Hollywood Cartoons : American Animation in Its Golden Age: American Animation in Its Golden Age. Oxford University Press. ISBN 9780198020790.
- Lehman, Christopher P. (2007). "Black Characterizations". The Colored Cartoon: Black Representation in American Animated Short Films, 1907-1954. University of Massachusetts Press. ISBN 9781558497795.
- Stausbauch, John (2007), "Black & White Film", Black Like You: Blackface, Whiteface, Insult & Imitation in American Popular Culture, Penguin Group, ISBN 978-1101216057

== See also ==
- Daffy Duck and the Dinosaur - An earlier cartoon that used a caricature of Jack Benny and used his usual farewell.
