= Best of the West Rides Again =

Greatest hits album by Riders in the Sky
- Released: October 25, 1989
- Genre: Western swing
- Length: 64:15
- Label: Rounder

Riders in the Sky chronology
Riders Go Commercial (1989)	Best of the West Rides Again (1989)	Horse Opera (1990)

Professional ratings
Review scores
Source	Rating
Allmusic	link

Best of the West Rides Again is a compilation recording by the Western band Riders in the Sky in 1989.

This is the second compilation taken from the Rounder albums presented by Riders in the Sky.

== Track listing ==
1. "Three on the Trail" – 1:57
2. "Back in the Saddle Again" (Gene Autry, Ray Whitley) – 2:14
3. "Cool Water" (Bob Nolan) – 3:23
4. "Desperado Trail" – 2:54
5. "At the End of the Rainbow Trail" (Douglas Green) – 2:09
6. "Down the Trail to San Antone" (Spriggins) – 1:54
7. "Blue Shadows on the Trail" (Daniel, Lange) – 3:40
8. "(I've Got Spurs That) Jingle Jangle Jingle" (Lilley, Frank Loesser) – 2:35
9. "Pecos Bill" (Daniel, Lange, Nolan, Smith) – 2:22
10. "Streets of Laredo (The Cowboy's Lament)" (Traditional) – 3:07
11. "West Texas Cowboy" – 3:01
12. "Cowpoke" (Jones) – 1:38
13. "Old El Paso" (Green) – 2:13
14. "Skyball Paint" – 1:29
15. "Compadres in the Old Sierra Madre" – 3:09
16. "Bound to Hit the Trail" – 2:16
17. "Ojo Caliente" – 3:09
18. "The Yodel Blues" (Dolan, Mercer) – 2:28
19. "Pretty Prairie Princess" (Paul) – 2:22
20. "Chasin' the Sun" (Green) – 2:01
21. "When the Bloom Is on the Sage" (Vincent, Wright) – 3:35
22. "Singing a Song to the Sky" (Green) – 2:27
23. "On the Rhythm Range" – 2:22
24. "Red River Valley" (Traditional) – 4:03
25. "When Payday Rolls Around" (Nolan) – 1:47

== Personnel ==
- Douglas B. Green (a.k.a. Ranger Doug) – guitar, vocals
- Paul Chrisman (a.k.a. Woody Paul) – fiddle, vocals
- Fred LaBour (a.k.a. Too Slim) – bass, vocals
