= James Kern =

James Kern may refer to:

- James V. Kern (1909–1966), American singer, songwriter, screenwriter, actor, and director
- Jim Kern (born 1949), American baseball pitcher
