= Georgia Carroll =

American singer (1919 - 2011)

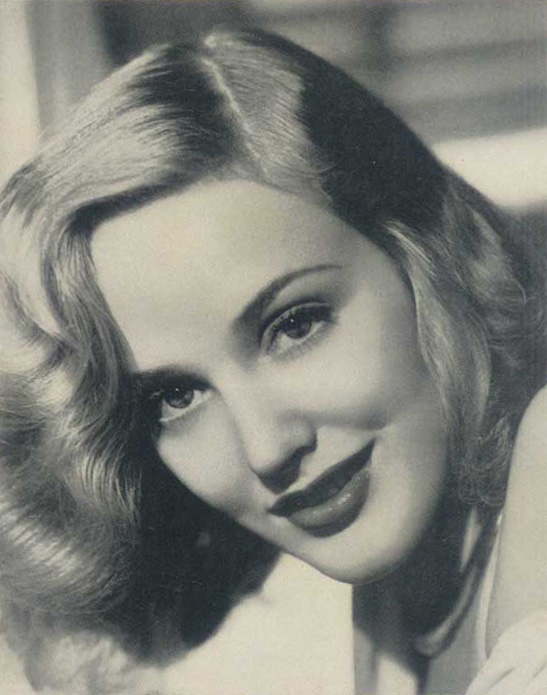
- Carroll in 1942

Background information
- Born: November 18, 1919; Blooming Grove, Texas, U.S
- Died: January 14, 2011 (aged 91)
- Occupation: Big-band singer
- Instrument: Singing
- Years active: 1941–1946
- Spouse: Kay Kyser (m. 1944; died 1985)

Georgia Carroll (November 18, 1919 – January 14, 2011) was an American singer, model and actress, best known for her work with Kay Kyser's big band orchestra in the mid-1940s. She and Kyser were married from 1944 until he died in 1985.

== Life ==
The daughter of Roger Carroll and his wife, Carroll was born in Blooming Grove, Texas, where her father raised sheep. Her family moved to Dallas, Texas, where she graduated from Woodrow Wilson High School.

One of Carroll's early jobs was modeling for a department store in Dallas. She eventually went to New York City and worked for the John Powers modeling agency. While she worked as a model in New York, she took vocal lessons.

She had her first brush with celebrity when she was the model for "The Spirit of the Centennial" statue at the 1936 Texas Centennial Exposition at Fair Park in Dallas, Texas. The statue still stands in front of what is now The Women's Museum. She was a 1937 graduate of Woodrow Wilson High School in Dallas and has been inducted into the school's Hall of Fame along with many other well-known graduates.

Carroll came to Hollywood when producers wanted her to play Daisy Mae in a film version of the Li'l Abner. Her height cost her that opportunity, however, when she turned out to be taller than the actor selected to play the title character.

Her acting career began in 1941 when she appeared in several uncredited small roles in films such as Maisie Was a Lady with Lew Ayres and Ann Sothern, Ziegfeld Girl with Judy Garland, as well as You're in the Army Now and Navy Blues, in both of which she appeared with the Navy Blues Sextette. She appeared as Betsy Ross in the James Cagney musical Yankee Doodle Dandy in 1942. She also did modelling during this time, appearing in advertisements for Jewelite hairbrushes, among other products. Anne Taintor used some of these advertisements featuring Carroll to express the voice of the modern woman.

In 1943, Carroll joined Kay Kyser's band, Kay Kyser's Kollege of Musical Knowledge, as a featured vocalist. Capitalizing on her good looks, she was given the nickname "Gorgeous Georgia Carroll", probably as a joking reference to the professional wrestler George Wagner, who used the name Gorgeous George. As a member of Kyser's band, Carroll appeared in three films: Around the World, Carolina Blues, and most notably the World War II-era "morale booster" Thousands Cheer which gave fans a chance to see Kyser and his band in Technicolor. Kyser's band has a featured performance near the end of the film, with Carroll delivering a key solo interlude of the Arthur Freed/Nacio Herb Brown standard "Should I?"

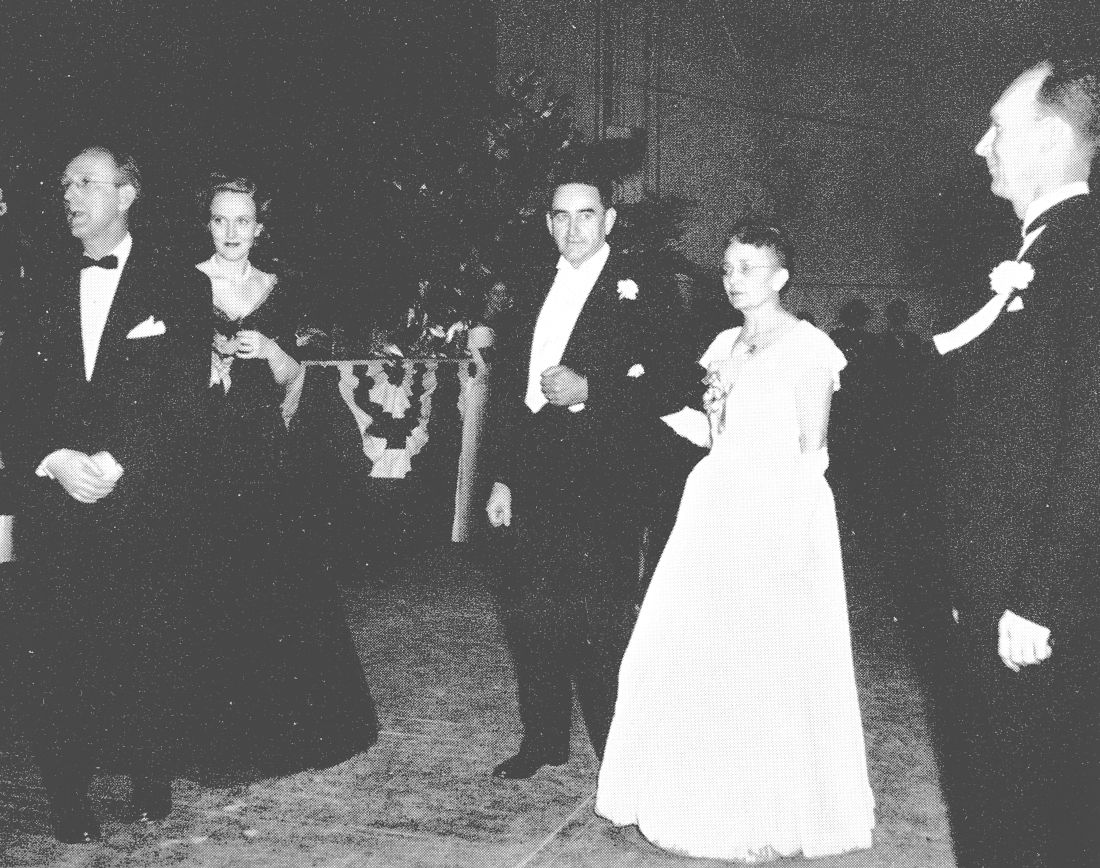
Carroll (second from left) with her husband, Governor W. Kerr Scott, First Lady Mary White Scott, and John Anderson at the North Carolina Inaugural Ball in 1949.

In 1945, Carroll married Kyser and made no further film appearances, retiring from performing in 1946; Kyser retired from performing in 1951. The couple, who had three children, remained married until his death in 1985. Carroll had been living in Chapel Hill since retirement. The University of North Carolina at Chapel Hill is custodian of a large archive of documents and material about Kay Kyser which was donated by Carroll.
