= On a Slow Boat to China =

1948 popular song by Frank Loesser

Song
- Published: 1948
- Genre: Traditional pop
- Songwriter: Frank Loesser

"On a Slow Boat to China", sometimes shortened to "Slow Boat to China", is a popular song by American songwriter Frank Loesser, published in 1948.

It is a well-known pop standard, recorded by many artists, including a duet between Rosemary Clooney and Bing Crosby (for their 1958 album Fancy Meeting You Here), Ella Fitzgerald, Joni James, Frank Sinatra, Dean Martin, Sammy Davis Jr., Jimmy Buffett, Fats Domino, and Liza Minnelli.

In the UK, the biggest hit version was recorded in 1959 by Emile Ford and the Checkmates, which peaked at No. 3 on the UK singles chart.

== Hit recordings ==
Recorded by	Label	Catalog number	Date first reached the Billboard magazine Best Seller chart	Weeks on chart	Peak	Notes
Kay Kyser and His Orchestra (vocals: Harry Babbitt & Gloria Wood)	Columbia Records	38301	October 15, 1948	19	#2	This version was a number one hit in Australia in 1949 as well.
Freddy Martin and His Orchestra (vocals: Glenn Hughes and The Martin Men)	RCA Victor Records	20-3123	October 29, 1948	17	#5	
Benny Goodman	Capitol Records	15208	November 12, 1948	12	#10	
Art Lund	MGM Records	10269	November 5, 1948	9	#13	
Larry Clinton	Decca Records	24482	November 26, 1948	1	#27	

== Idiom ==
Frank Loesser's daughter, Susan Loesser, authored a biography of her father, A Most Remarkable Fella (1993), in which she writes,

"I'd like to get you on a slow boat to China" was a well-known phrase among poker players, referring to a person who lost steadily and handsomely. My father turned it into a romantic song, placing the title in the mainstream of catch-phrases in 1947.

The idea is that "a slow boat to China" was the longest trip one could imagine. Loesser shifted the phrase to a more romantic setting, yet it eventually entered general parlance to mean anything that takes an extremely long time.

== Media ==
The phrase "a slow boat to China" (or a snowclone thereof) features:

- Sung by Lancaster Dodd (Philip Seymour Hoffman) to Freddie Quell (Joaquin Phoenix) in Paul Thomas Anderson's 2012 film *The Master.
