= My Favorite Spy =

My Favorite Spy may refer to:

- My Favorite Spy (1942 film), an American comedy film directed by Tay Garnett
- My Favorite Spy (1951 film), an American comedy film directed by Norman Z. McLeod
