= You'll Find Out =

1940 film

- Film poster
- Directed by: David Butler; Fred Fleck (assistant)
- Written by: David Butler; James V. Kern; Monte Brice; Andrew Bennison; R.T.M. Scott
- Produced by: David Butler
- Starring: Kay Kyser; Boris Karloff; Peter Lorre; Bela Lugosi
- Cinematography: Frank Redman
- Edited by: Irene Morra
- Music by: Roy Webb
- Production company: RKO Radio Pictures
- Release date: November 22, 1940
- Running time: 97 minutes
- Country: United States
- Language: English
- Budget: $371,000
- Box office: $1 million

You'll Find Out is a 1940 American comedy film directed by David Butler and starring Kay Kyser. In 1940, the film was nominated for an Academy Award for Best Original Song ("I'd Know You Anywhere") at the 13th Academy Awards. In the film, members of an orchestra hired to play at a young heiress's birthday party uncover a plot against her. The film was very popular and made a profit of $167,000.

== Plot ==
After Kay Kyser and his orchestra arrive at a castle-shaped mansion, the drawbridge leading to it is mysteriously dynamited, stranding both entertainers and guests.

Kyser is suspicious of mystic Prince Saliano, and for good reason. He is taking advantage of the heiress' Aunt Bellacrest's belief in spiritualism to swindle the estate out of large sums of money. Saliano has been "planted" in the house by the "respectable" family attorney, Judge Mainwaring. Also in on the swindle is Professor Fenninger, who claims to be an expert on uncovering phony spiritualists (something he has no real intention of doing).

After a series of typical "haunted house" jokes, Kyser uncovers a basement "command center" that provides the special effects for Saliano's phony seances.

The three criminals attempt to escape using dynamite as a shield. But Ish Kabibble's dog retrieves the lit stick and returns it to the criminals. There is a loud explosion, and the dog returns carrying Saliano's turban.

== Cast ==
- Kay Kyser as himself
- Peter Lorre as Professor Karl Fenninger
- Boris Karloff as Judge Spencer Mainwaring
- Bela Lugosi as Prince Saliano
- Helen Parrish as Janis Bellacrest
- Dennis O'Keefe as Chuck Deems
- Alma Kruger as Aunt Margo Bellacrest
- Joseph Eggenton as Jurgen, Butler
- Kay Kyser's Band as Themselves
- Jeff Corey as himself (or a character named "Mr. Corey", at least)
- Harry Babbitt as himself
- Ginny Simms as herself
- Ish Kabibble as himself
- Sully Mason as himself

== See also ==
- Boris Karloff filmography
- Bela Lugosi filmography
