= James V. Kern =

American actor (1909–1966)

- Publicity photo of James V. Kern
- Born: September 22, 1909; New York City, New York, U.S.
- Died: November 9, 1966 (aged 57); Encino, California, U.S.
- Occupations: Actor, singer, songwriter, screenwriter, director
- Years active: 1929–1966
- Spouse: Ethel Lawrence

James V. Kern (September 22, 1909, New York City, New York – November 9, 1966, Encino, California) was an American singer, songwriter, and actor (with the Yacht Club Boys), and became a screenwriter and director.

He studied for six years at the Fordham Law School before opening his own practice, which lasted for two years. He sang with the George Olsen Trio, and appeared with the Olsen orchestra in the musical Good News.

== The Yacht Club Boys ==
From 1929 to 1939, as Jimmie Kern, he sang with and wrote for the Yacht Club Boys musical-comedy quartet, which was extremely successful. The group appeared on stage in America and abroad, on radio, on recordings, and in motion pictures. Syndicated columnist Paul Harrison observed: "The Yacht Club Boys have a way of popping up almost anywhere. Leave them on Broadway with their name in lights, go to London, and you'll likely find them chanting their topical ditties in the Café de Paris. Or go to Miami and you'll run smack into them in the lobby of the Fleetwood. You see them on trains; you stand in line with them at the mutuel windows at Santa Anita; you find them playing bridge at Saratoga. Drive out in the middle of the desert and turn on your radio -- the Yacht Club Boys again."

The quartet disbanded in May 1939. Jimmie Kern was the first to leave, becoming a screenwriter for RKO Radio Pictures.

== Director ==
Warner Bros. signed him as a director in 1942. He made both major and minor features through 1951. (His only screen credit thereafter, Lum and Abner Abroad (1955), was really three half-hour television episodes filmed in Yugoslavia, and combined into a feature film.)

After Kern moved to television he directed hundreds of series episodes, and was one of the house directors on I Love Lucy in the 1950s. He directed My Three Sons for most of two seasons in the 1960s.

Although Kern had composed dozens of songs for the Yacht Club Boys, he didn't become a member of ASCAP until 1955. His popular-song compositions include "Easy Street," "Lover, Lover," "Little Red Fox," and "Shut the Door." He was married to Ethel Lawrence, formerly of "George White's Scandals". When he died suddenly of a heart attack in 1966 at age 57, several episodes of My Three Sons remained only partially completed for the 1966–67 season; they were completed by director James Sheldon.

== Filmography ==
=== As director ===
- 1944: The Doughgirls
- 1946: Never Say Goodbye
- 1947: Stallion Road
- 1948: April Showers
- 1950: The Colgate Comedy Hour (television series)
- 1950: The Jack Benny Program (television series)
- 1950: The Second Woman
- 1951: Two Tickets to Broadway
- 1953: Topper (television series)
- 1955: The Millionaire (television series)
- 1956: Lum and Abner Abroad (feature-length compilation of TV episodes)
- 1956: The Gale Storm Show (television series)
- 1956: I Love Lucy (television series)
- 1957: Date with the Angels (television series)
- 1957: Maverick (television series)
- 1958: The Ann Sothern Show (television series)
- 1958: 77 Sunset Strip (television series)
- 1958: The Donna Reed Show (television series)
- 1960: New Comedy Showcase (television series)
- 1960: Pete and Gladys (television series)
- 1960: My Three Sons (television series)
- 1961: The Joey Bishop Show (television series)
- 1965: My Favorite Martian (television series)

=== As writer ===
- 1939: That's Right – You're Wrong
- 1940: If I Had My Way
- 1940: You'll Find Out
- 1941: Look Who's Laughing
- 1941: Playmates
- 1943: Thank Your Lucky Stars
- 1944: Shine On, Harvest Moon
- 1944: The Doughgirls
- 1945: The Horn Blows at Midnight
- 1946: Never Say Goodbye

=== As actor, all with The Yacht Club Boys ===
- 1929-30: Vitaphone and Paramount short subjects
- 1929-30: Vitaphone and Paramount short subjects
- 1933-34: Paramount short subjects
- 1934, 1936: Vitaphone short subjects

Feature films:

- 1935: Thanks a Million
- 1936: The Singing Kid
- 1936: Stage Struck
- 1937: Artists and Models
- 1937: Thrill of a Lifetime (their only starring feature)
- 1938: Cocoanut Grove
- 1938: Artists and Models Abroad (final film)

=== As producer ===
- 1950: The Jack Benny Program (television series)
- 1956: Lum and Abner Abroad (compilation of TV episodes)
