= Blackhawk (restaurant) =

Restaurant in Chicago, Illinois, U.S.

- Interactive map of Blackhawk

Restaurant information
- Established: December 27, 1920
- Closed: December 31, 2009
- Location: Chicago, Illinois, United States
- Coordinates: 41.8843°N 87.6260°W

The Blackhawk was a restaurant in the Chicago Loop from 1920 to 1984. It served a menu of American cuisine, notably prime rib and a signature "spinning salad bowl", and was, in the early part of its history a nationally known entertainment venue for Big Band music. Its legacy continued until 2009 at Don Roth's Blackhawk in Wheeling, Illinois.

== History ==
Otto Roth opened The Blackhawk on December 27, 1920, at 139 N. Wabash. In September 1926, The Blackhawk began featuring a dance orchestra, Carlton Coon-Joe Sanders and their Kansas City Nighthawks. In addition to providing dance music for the local diners, the music from the Blackhawk was broadcast nationally as "Live! From the Blackhawk!" over WGN Radio and the Mutual Network.

By the time Coon-Sanders moved on from the Blackhawk in 1931, the broadcasts from the Blackhawk were so popular that a telegraph machine was installed so they could take remote requests. The Coon-Sanders band was followed by a rotating crop of musicians which, over the years, included Kay Kyser, Chico Marx, Louis Prima, Ish Kabibble and many more. Mel Torme, whose first paying performance occurred at the Blackhawk in 1929, became a frequent performer there. In 1938, Bob Haggart of Bob Crosby and the Bobcats composed "Big Noise from Winnetka" at the Blackhawk. Doris Day made her first appearance with the Crosby band at the Blackhawk in the spring of 1940.

In 1944, Don Roth (1913–2003) inherited the Blackhawk upon the death of his father. Roth used his experience as a theatrical booker to increase the restaurant's reputation in and outside Chicago.

When the Blackhawk stopped featuring orchestras in 1952 and removed the bandstand and the dance floor, Don Roth declared the restaurant's theme was "The Food's the Show" and focused on the house specialty of prime rib served from carts brought to the tables and its "spinning salad bowl". Waiters would bring a large bowl of greens set into a larger bowl of ice. As they spun it, the waiters would add ingredients and describe what they were doing to the diners. Roth borrowed these concepts from Lawry's in Beverly Hills, California.

The Blackhawk remained open until August 31, 1984.

== Don Roth's Blackhawk ==
In 1969, Don Roth opened a second restaurant, Don Roth's Blackhawk, in the northwest Chicago suburb of Wheeling, Illinois. This location, which was later decorated with photos and memorabilia from the original Blackhawk, remained in business until December 31, 2009, when Roth's widow, Ann, nearing 90, elected to close the restaurant. The building was demolished in March 2014. Don Roth's Blackhawk continued to feature the "Spinning Salad Bowl" and prime rib.

== Spinning Bowl Dressing ==
The signature spinning salad featured two kinds of dressing, one of which the restaurant had specially bottled. The bottled dressing continues to be manufactured and sold in the Chicago area.
