= Trudy Erwin =

- Born: Virginia Lee Erwin; August 12, 1918; El Monte, California, U.S.
- Died: October 29, 2000 (aged 82) San Diego, California, U.S.
- Genres: Pop, Big band, Jazz
- Occupation: Singer
- Labels: Decca, 4 Star
- Formerly of: The Music Maids, Kay Kyser, Bing Crosby

Trudy Erwin (known as Jinny) (born August 12, 1918 – October 29, 2000) was an American singer and actress in films who was a vocalist with the Kay Kyser orchestra in the 1940s.

== Career ==
As a teenager. she was part of a vocal quintet called the Music Maids.

The Music Maids were used in the Bing Crosby film East Side of Heaven to back Crosby on the song "Hang Your Heart on a Hickory Limb." Subsequently the Music Maids joined the cast of the Kraft Music Hall hosted by Crosby, making their debut on February 23, 1939. Whilst working with Crosby, she recorded several hit songs with him including the 1943 duets "People Will Say We're In Love" (No. 1) and "Oh! What A Beautiful Mornin'" (No. 4).

Whilst they remained on the show until 1944, Erwin left the group to join Kay Kyser in October 1941 as a partial replacement for Ginny Simms. She had a hit record with Kyser on "Who Wouldn't Love You" when she paired with Harry Babbitt and the song reached the top of the charts in April 1942. She returned to the Kraft show on February 4, 1943 as the resident female singer until December 1943 when she left to have a baby.

Erwin, credited as Trudy Stevens, dubbed Kim Novak's singing voice for "My Funny Valentine" in the movie Pal Joey.

== Voice dubbing ==
- Too Many Girls (1940), for Lucille Ball
- Blues in the Night (1941), for Betty Field
- The Great John L. (1945), for Linda Darnell
- Yolanda and the Thief (1945), for Lucille Bremer
- Till the Clouds Roll By (1946), for Lucille Bremer
- Dead Reckoning (1947), for Lizabeth Scott
- I Walk Alone (1947), for Lizabeth Scott
- One Sunday Afternoon (1948), for girl on bicycle
- Always Leave Them Laughing (1949), for Ruth Roman
- Dark City (1950), for Lizabeth Scott
- Mr. Imperium (1951), for Lana Turner
- Painting the Clouds with Sunshine (1951), for Virginia Gibson
- The Merry Widow (1952), for Lana Turner
- Pal Joey (1957), for Kim Novak, (as Trudy Stevens)
- White Christmas (1954), for Vera-Ellen

== Personal life ==
Erwin married Murdo F. MacKenzie (1913—1999), a sound engineer, for Bing Crosby (radio and albums), NBC, and ABC, at San Juan Capistrano Mission on February 14, 1942. In December 1943, she left the cast of the Kraft Music Hall hosted by Crosby, to have a baby.

Murdo MacKenzie served as the producer for The Bing Crosby – Rosemary Clooney Show.
