= My Favorite Spy (1942 film) =

1942 film by Tay Garnett

- Directed by: Tay Garnett
- Screenplay by: Sig Herzig; William Bowers
- Story by: M. Coates Webster
- Produced by: Harold Lloyd
- Starring: Kay Kyser; Ellen Drew; Jane Wyman
- Cinematography: Robert De Grasse
- Edited by: Desmond Marquette
- Music by: Roy Webb
- Production company: RKO Pictures
- Distributed by: RKO Pictures
- Release date: June 12, 1942
- Running time: 86 minutes
- Country: United States
- Language: English

My Favorite Spy is a 1942 American comedy spy film directed by Tay Garnett and featuring Kay Kyser, Ellen Drew and Jane Wyman.

== Plot ==
Just after getting married, Kay Kyser is recruited by the army as a spy.

== Cast ==
- Kay Kyser as himself
- Ish Kabibble as himself
- Ellen Drew as Teresa "Terry" Kyser
- Jane Wyman as Connie
- Robert Armstrong as Harry Robinson
- Helen Westley as Aunt Jessie
- William Demarest as Flower Pot Policeman
- Una O'Connor as Cora
- Lionel Royce as Winters
- Moroni Olsen as Major Allen
- George Cleveland as Gus
- Vaughan Glaser as Colonel Moffett
- Hobart Cavanaugh as Jules
- Chester Clute as Higgenbotham
- Teddy Hart as Complaining Soldier

== See also ==
- List of American films of 1942
