= Fred Fleck =

American filmmaker

- Born: June 4, 1892; New York City, New York, United States
- Died: November 9, 1961 (aged 69); North Hollywood, California, United States
- Occupation: Filmmaker
- Years active: 1928–1957

Fred Fleck (June 6, 1892 – November 9, 1961), also known as Fred A. Fleck, Frederick Fleck, or Freddie Fleck, was an American assistant director and production manager. Born in New York City on June 4, 1892, he broke into the film business as an assistant director on the 1928 silent film The Riding Renegade, directed by Wallace Fox. During his 30-year career, he would work on some notable films, with some notable directors. Those films included the epic Hell's Angels (1930), directed by Howard Hughes; Bird of Paradise (1932), directed by King Vidor; Tom, Dick and Harry (1941), directed by Garson Kanin, starring Ginger Rogers; The Magnificent Ambersons (1942), directed by Orson Welles, starring Joseph Cotten and Anne Baxter; Born to be Bad (1950), directed by Nicholas Ray, starring Joan Fontaine and Robert Ryan; and Jet Pilot (1957), directed by Josef von Sternberg, starring John Wayne. Fleck was also one of the aerial cameramen on George Archainbaud's classic 1932 film, The Lost Squadron.

Fleck was also production manager on several notable films, including: Sylvia Scarlett (1935), directed by George Cukor, starring Katharine Hepburn; the Fred Astaire and Ginger Rogers vehicle, Swing Time (1936), directed by George Stevens; Stage Door (1937), directed by Gregory La Cava, starring Hepburn, Rogers and Adolphe Menjou; and The Las Vegas Story (1952), directed by Robert Stevenson, starring Jane Russell and Victor Mature.

Although Jet Pilot was released in 1957, it was produced in 1949–50, and sat on the shelf for seven years. The last film Fleck worked on was Son of Sinbad (1955), for which he was a production manager. He would die on November 9, 1961, in North Hollywood, California.

== Filmography ==
(as per AFI's database)

Year	Title	Role	Notes
1928	The Riding Renegade	Assistant director	
1930	Dixiana	Assistant director	
1930	Hell's Angels	Assistant director	
1930	Hit the Deck	Assistant director	
1930	Hook, Line and Sinker	Assistant director	
1930	Leathernecking	Assistant director	
1931	Cracked Nuts	Assistant director	
1932	Bird of Paradise	Assistant director	
1932	The Lost Squadron	Aerial photography	
1932	The Animal Kingdom	Unit manager	
1937	Sylvia Scarlett	Production manager	
1936	Swing Time	Production manager	
1937	Stage Door	Production manager	
1938	Carefree	Unit manager	
1939	That's Right – You're Wrong	Assistant director	
1940	You'll Find Out	Assistant director	
1941	Playmates	Assistant director	
1941	Tom, Dick and Harry	Assistant director	
1941	Citizen Kane	Assistant	
1942	The Magnificent Ambersons	Assistant director	
1943	The Falcon in Danger	Assistant Director	
1943	Flight for Freedom	Supervisor overwater aviation shots	
1944	My Pal Wolf	Assistant director	
1945	The Enchanted Cottage	Assistant director	
1945	George White's Scandals	Assistant director	
1946	The Spiral Staircase	Production manager	
1947	They Won't Believe Me	Unit manager	
1948	If You Knew Susie	Production manager	
1948	The Miracle of the Bells	Production manager	
1949	Bride for Sale	Assistant director	
1949	The Window	Assistant director	
1950	Born to Be Bad	Assistant director	
1950	Walk Softly, Stranger	Production manager	
1951	Two Tickets to Broadway	Assistant director	
1952	The Las Vegas Story	Unit manager	
1953	Angel Face	Assistant director	
1953	Split Second	Assistant director	
1954	She Couldn't Say No	Assistant director	
1955	Son of Sinbad	Unit manager	
1957	Jet Pilot	Assistant director	
