= I Cover the Waterfront =

1933 film directed by James Cruze

- Theatrical release poster
- Directed by: James Cruze
- Written by: Jack Jevne (additional dialogue)
- Screenplay by: Wells Root
- Based on: I Cover the Waterfront; 1932 novel by Max Miller
- Produced by: Edward Small; Joseph M. Schenck
- Starring: Ben Lyon; Claudette Colbert; Ernest Torrence; Hobart Cavanaugh
- Cinematography: Ray June
- Edited by: Grant Whytock
- Music by: Alfred Newman
- Production companies: Reliance Pictures; Joseph M. Schenck Productions
- Distributed by: United Artists
- Release date: May 17, 1933 (US)
- Running time: 75 minutes (8 reels)
- Country: United States
- Language: English

I Cover the Waterfront is a 1933 American pre-Code romantic drama film directed by James Cruze and starring Ben Lyon, Claudette Colbert, Ernest Torrence, and Hobart Cavanaugh.

Based on then best-selling novel by Max Miller, a reporter for the San Diego Sun, the film is about a reporter who investigates a waterfront smuggling operation, and becomes romantically involved with the daughter of the man he is investigating.

== Plot ==
San Diego Standard reporter H. Joseph Miller has been covering the city's seedy waterfront for the past five years and is fed up with the work. Dogged by the lack of progress of his current assignment investigating the smuggling of Chinese into the country by a fisherman named Eli Kirk, he longs to escape his grim life and land a newspaper job back East so he can marry his Vermont sweetheart.

One morning after wasting an entire night tracking down bad leads, his editor, John Phelps, insists he investigate a report of a girl swimming naked at the beach. There he meets cheerful and cheeky Julie Kirk, the daughter of the man he's been investigating.

Meanwhile, Eli and his crew are returning to San Diego with a human cargo when the Coast Guard approaches. To avoid being caught with evidence of his smuggling operation Kirk orders his men to wrap his illegal Chinese payload's legs in anchor chain and cast him overboard. The Coast Guard, accompanied by Miller, board the boat but find nothing. The next day, a local bottom-dragging scavenger discovers the man's body, and hauls it up with Miller's help. Still Phelps remains skeptical of Kirk's involvement. Miller tells him he plans to romance Kirk's daughter Julie in order to get conclusive evidence of Kirk's activity.

When Kirk returns, he informs Julie that they will need to move on soon – maybe to Singapore – as soon as he can put together enough money for the voyage. One night, Julie discovers her father drunk at a boarding house. Miller, who was there investigating Kirk, helps Julie take him home.

Julie does not discourage Miller's flirtations over the next few weeks. Boarding an old square-rigger dressed up as a "torture ship" on a date, he playfully shackles her in a standing rack and kisses her repeatedly. Their play turns into passion. As they fall in love she is able to help Miller see the beauty of the waterfront, and inspires him to finish the novel he's been working for the past five years.

Julie and Miller have a romantic evening together on the beach, where she reveals that she and her father will be sailing away in the next few days. They spend the night together in Miller's apartment, after which Julie announces that she's decided to stay, hoping he will too. When Miller learns from Julie – who is still blissfully ignorant of her father's criming – that Kirk is due to dock at the Chinese settlement that night, he notifies the Coast Guard. Once again they search the vessel and find nothing. Miller then reveals a Chinese man hidden inside a large shark. Before Kirk can be arrested he flees, but is wounded in his getaway.

The next morning Miller's story breaks in the Standard and is front page news across the nation. When a wounded Kirk staggers home, Julie learns that Miller tipped off the Coast Guard. Soon after, Miller, feeling guilty over all he's caused, arrives there, apologizes for the hurt he's caused, and announces that he loves her. Angry at being used, Julie sends him away. Later that night, Miller locates Kirk, who shoots him in the arm. Julie arrives to help her father escape, but seeing Miller wounded announces she cannot leave Miller to die. Seeing that she loves him, Kirk helps her take Miller to safety, then dies.

Later from his hospital bed, Miller acknowledges in his newspaper column that Julie saved his life before he died. Sometime later, Miller returns to his apartment, where she is waiting to greet him. Discovering that she cleaned and transformed his place into a cozy home, he tells her he finally wrote the ending to his novel, "He marries the girl".

"That's a swell finish", Julie acknowledges, and the two embrace.

== Cast ==
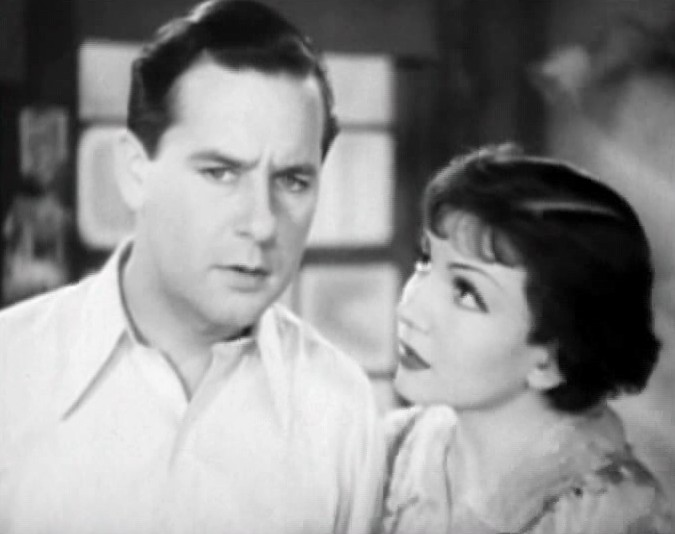
Ben Lyon and Claudette Colbert

- Ben Lyon as H. Joseph Miller
- Claudette Colbert as Julie Kirk
- Ernest Torrence as Eli Kirk, Julie's father
- Hobart Cavanaugh as McCoy
- Maurice Black as Ortegus, Kirk's first mate
- Purnell Pratt as John Phelps, Miller's editor
- Harry Beresford as Old Chris, the salvage man
- Wilfred Lucas as Randall, the Coast Guard officer

== Production ==
Rights to the novel were bought by Edward Small and his partner Harry Goets in 1932. The picture was made through the Reliance Picture Corporation, which co-produced it with Joseph Schenck's Art Cinema Corporation. as the first of a six-film deal with United Artists.

=== Filming ===
I Cover the Waterfront was filmed from mid-February to early March 1933.

=== Soundtrack ===
The film's title song, "I Cover the Waterfront", appears in the film only as an instrumental. Written by Johnny Green and Edward Heyman, the song went on to become a jazz standard recorded by many artists, including Billie Holiday, Louis Armstrong, Frank Sinatra, The Ink Spots, and Ella Fitzgerald, among others.

== Critical response ==
In his review for The New York Times, film critic Mordaunt Hall called the film "a stolid and often grim picture". While Hall felt the drama was not as good as some of director James Cruze's previous work, the "clever acting of the principals"—especially that of Ernest Torrence—offset some of the film's shortcomings. Hall found some of the scenes "more shocking than suspenseful" and felt a broader adaptation of Max Miller's book may have been more interesting than the focus on the melodramatic series of incidents about a sinister fisherman. While acknowledging that "Colbert does well as Julie", Hall did not find her convincing as a fisherman's daughter because she does not look the type. Hall reserved his highest praise for Ernest Torrence in his final screen performance. Torrence died on May 15, 1933, shortly after the film was completed.

John Mosher of The New Yorker described the adaptation as a "commonplace screen romance," but also praised the performance of the late Torrence, writing that he "was at the height of his power ... One can foresee that many pictures will be empty things for lack of him." Variety said: "Rather than an adaption of the Max Miller book, this is a homemade studio yarn carrying the original’s title", calling it "a moderately entertaining picture ... The late Ernest Torrence has the meat part and his performance is in keeping with the standard he had set for himself. A pretty tough assignment they gave him, one in which it was necessary to capture sympathy in face of the worst sort of opposition from the script. He'll be sorely missed on the screen."

== Remakes ==
I Cover the Waterfront was remade in 1961 by Edward Small as Secret of Deep Harbor.

== See also ==
- List of films in the public domain in the United States
