= Playmates (1941 film) =

1941 film by David Butler

- Theatrical release poster
- Directed by: David Butler; Fred Fleck (assistant)
- Screenplay by: James V. Kern
- Story by: James V. Kern; M.M. Musselman
- Produced by: David Butler
- Starring: Kay Kyser; John Barrymore; Lupe Vélez; Ginny Simms; May Robson; Patsy Kelly
- Cinematography: Frank Redman
- Edited by: Irene Morra
- Music by: Roy Webb
- Production company: RKO Radio Pictures
- Distributed by: RKO Radio Pictures
- Release date: December 26, 1941
- Running time: 96 minutes
- Country: United States
- Language: English

Playmates is a 1941 American comedy film directed by David Butler and written by James V. Kern. The film stars Kay Kyser, John Barrymore (in his final film), Lupe Vélez, Ginny Simms, May Robson and Patsy Kelly. It was released on December 26, 1941 by RKO Radio Pictures.

== Plot ==
Lulu Monahan, press agent for John Barrymore, tries to attract a sponsor for Barrymore's radio program. Lulu and bandleader Kay Kyser's agent concoct a story that a great actor will teach Kyser how to play Shakespeare. In New York City, they visit each other to find out how the Hollywood contract for a new agent is.

== Cast ==
- Kay Kyser as Kay Kyser
- John Barrymore as John Barrymore
- Lupe Vélez as Carmen Del Toro
- Ginny Simms as Ginny Simms
- May Robson as Grandma Kyser
- Patsy Kelly as Lulu Monahan
- Peter Lind Hayes as Peter Lindsay
- Ish Kabibble as Ish Kabibble
- Sully Mason as Sully Mason
- Harry Babbitt as Harry Babbitt
- Leon Belasco as Prince Maharoohu
- George Cleveland as Mr. Pennypacker (uncredited)
- Alice Fleming as Mrs. Pennypacker (uncredited)
