= Carolina Blues =

1943 film by Leigh Jason

- Theatrical release poster
- Directed by: Leigh Jason
- Screenplay by: Joseph Hoffman; Al Martin; Jack Henley
- Story by: M. M. Musselman; Kenneth Earl
- Produced by: Samuel Bischoff
- Starring: Kay Kyser; Ann Miller; Victor Moore; Jeff Donnell; Howard Freeman; Georgia Carroll; M.A. Bogue; Harry Babbitt; Sully Mason
- Cinematography: Franz Planer
- Edited by: James Sweeney
- Music by: M. W. Stoloff
- Production company: Columbia Pictures
- Distributed by: Columbia Pictures
- Release date: December 20, 1944
- Running time: 81 minutes
- Country: United States
- Language: English

Carolina Blues is a 1944 American comedy film directed by Leigh Jason and written by Joseph Hoffman, Al Martin and Jack Henley. The film stars Kay Kyser, Ann Miller, Victor Moore, Jeff Donnell, Howard Freeman, Georgia Carroll, M.A. Bogue, Harry Babbitt and Sully Mason. The film was released on December 20, 1944, by Columbia Pictures.

== Plot ==
Kay Kyser (Kay Kyser) and his band return to North Carolina after a long USO tour. Rather than taking a rest, the band plays at a nearby shipyard. There, Kay meets Julie Carver (Ann Miller), a fabulous vocalist whom he mistakes for the wealthy daughter of the shipyard's proprietor. Kay's usual vocalist, Georgia Carroll (Georgia Carroll), needs Julie to fill in for her so she can leave the band to get married. Kay resists Georgia's departure because he believes Julie's (apparent) wealth will mean she won't commit to staying with his band. After additional performances elsewhere by the band (to sell bonds to finance construction of navy war ships), Julie confesses to Kay that she is poor, is not related to the shipyard owner, and wants to join the band. Kay and Julie reconcile, and fall in love.

== Cast ==
- Kay Kyser as Kay Kyser
- Ann Miller as Julie Carver
- Victor Moore as Phineas / Elliott / Hiriam / Horatio / Aunt Martha / Aunt Minerva Carver
- Jeff Donnell as Charlotte Barton
- Howard Freeman as Tom Gordon
- Georgia Carroll as Georgia Carroll
- M.A. Bogue as Ish Kabibble
- Harry Babbitt as Harry Babbitt
- Sully Mason as Sully Mason
- Harold Nicholas as Dance Specialty
- Marie Bryant as Dancer in 'Mr. Beebe'
- Elvia Allman as Loud Kyser Fan
- June Richmond as Singer in 'Mr. Beebe' Number
