= Tal Henry =

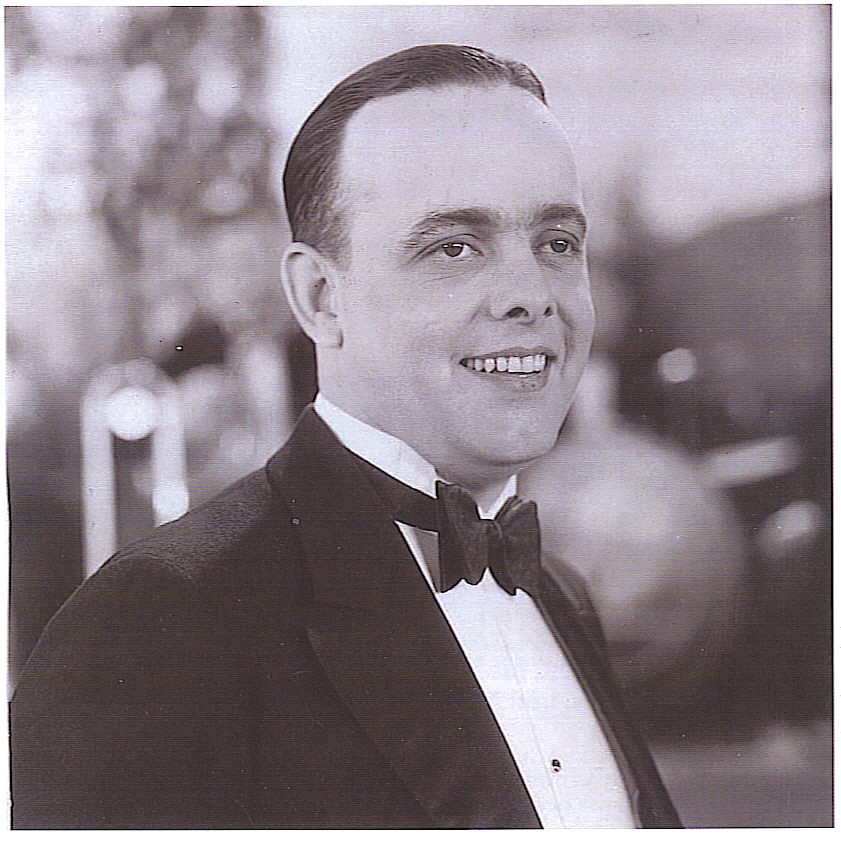
- Tal Henry

Background information
- Born: July 10, 1898
- Origin: Maysville, Georgia, U.S.
- Died: August 17, 1967 (aged 69)
- Genres: Big band Swing; Jazz
- Occupation: Bandleader
- Instrument: Violin
- Years active: 1919–1946
- Labels: Victor, Bluebird, Sunrise,
- Formerly of: Bob Hope; George Byrne; Daisy and Violet Hilton; Mary Pickford; Kate Smith; Kay Kyser; Fred Waring; Paul Whiteman; Jan Garber; Duke Ellington; Vincent Lopez; Randolph Scott; Tommy Dorsey; Jimmy Dorsey; Hal Kemp; Jack Marshall; Nat "King" Cole; Randy Brooks; Ina Ray Hutton; Lionel Hampton; Larry Clinton

Tal Henry (July 10, 1898 – August 17, 1967) was an American orchestra director in the swing and big band eras.

== Early life ==
Henry was born Talmadge Allen Henry in Maysville, Georgia. At the age of 7, he started playing the violin. He left Maysville in 1914 to attend Shenandoah Conservatory of Music located in Dayton, Virginia. The school moved to Winchester, Virginia and has become a university. After his education there, Henry went to Elon College, near Burlington, North Carolina, where he taught violin.

== Career ==
In early 1919, he began playing with the Frank Hood band and made his home in Greensboro, North Carolina. In 1924 Tal Henry took over the band and formed the Tal Henry and His North Carolinians Orchestra where he played in the O'Henry Hotel in Greensboro. The orchestra moved north to Washington, Pennsylvania playing the dances and events at the Washington Hotel. The orchestra performed in the New Yorker Hotel, Peabody Hotel, Baker Hotels of Texas, Casinos, Roseland Ballroom, Hershey Park Hotel, Steel Pier in Atlantic City and other Ballrooms, Theatre, Parks, Madison Square Garden, Loew's Palace, Million Dollar Photoplay Theatre. His photo was featured on several piano sheet music. He Broadcast on WLW, Cincinnati, WJZ-NBC New York City, and WEAF Danbury, Conn. The orchestra had a contract to perform at the formal opening of the Hotel Charlotte when the hotel opened in 1924. The orchestra moved on to the Mound Club in St. Louis, Missouri where he signed with William Foor-Robinson Orchestra Corporation of America. The Tal Henry orchestra went on to Harrisburg, Pennsylvania. Ed Fishman introduced Bob Hope and George Burns to Tal Henry and His North Carolinians and booked them into the Stanley in Pittsburgh. They traveled vaudeville for sixteen weeks, going from town to town playing wherever the act could find work. The Tal Henry Orchestra played for President Franklin D. Roosevelt's Birthday Ball. Tal Henry Orchestra was heard on NBC Network coast to coast. The first radio hook-up SS Starr off the Aleutian Islands to Tal Henry at Baker Hotel, Jan. 13, 1930. The front of Billboard Magazine on February 3, 1934, featured Tal Henry at $.15 a copy. In October, 1929 Orchestra World featured Tal Henry And His Victor Recording Orchestra Warner Bros. Vitaphone Artists.

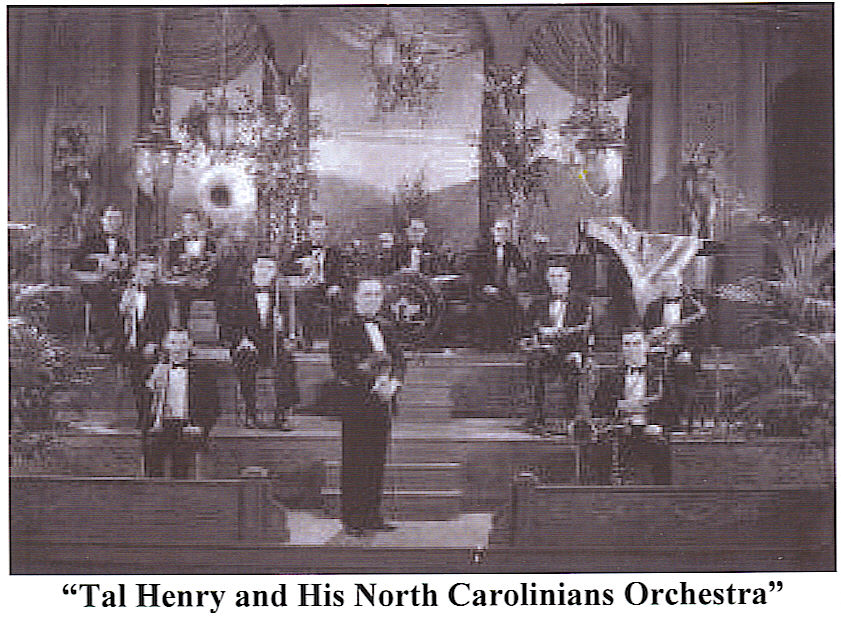

Tal Henry signed with the Orchestra Corporation of America, and so the orchestra was under contract with the Hotel New Yorker, Peabody Hotel in Memphis, Tenn., and the Baker Hotels all in the cities of the state of Texas. There was always a place for the orchestra in New York City. The Dorsey Brothers, Tommy and Jimmy, practiced with the orchestra when they were in the city. By the middle of the 1920s, the orchestra was nationally known as a famous band with the Victor Records, Bluebird and Sunrise records. In 1928, the orchestra produced two Warner Bros. and Victor Record Company's Vitaphone films. These Vitaphone shorts were used in theatres, radio, photoplay theatres, Loew's Palace and other standard movie theatres. Vitaphone was the first sound film technology to gain widespread acceptance in the early Swing Era offering audiences the closest approximation possible to a live performance. The orchestra played many of the movie theatres in the orchestra pit, on stage, in hotel ballrooms, and any other venues where the orchestra performed.

Tal Henry and His Orchestra was billed at the Hershey Park Hotel, on the advertisement, dated Wednesday May 25, 1932, with admission 50 cents. They were also billed Saturday May 21, 1932 "Harlem's Aristocrat of Jazz" with Duke Ellington, followed on May 28, 1932, Vincent Lopez would be at the same ballroom in the Hershey Park Hotel. Memorial Day on May 30, 1932, had Opie Cates and His Orchestra. Tal Henry recorded Victor Records, Bluebird and Sunrise recordings in New York City on May 6, 1926, Camden, New Jersey on April 25, 1928. New York City on May 22, 1928, New York City December 5, 1928 and New York City on February 7, 1934.

On February 3, 1934, The Billboard Magazine featured Tal Henry on the cover. The World's Foremost Amusement Weekly. Orchestra World featured Tal Henry And His Victor Recording Orchestra. Warner Bros. Vitaphone Artists on the issue October, 1929.

Tal's photo was on the front of Max Hart Inc Magazine. He was presented as the Exclusive VICTOR Artists, Tal Henry and his North Carolinians Orchestra, claiming Tal Henry as "The Prince of Personality" with a great Orchestra from the Cotton Belt of North Carolina. They were known far and wide throughout daily radio broadcast over the networks of the National Broadcasting Company, featured particularly through Station WEAF in New York. In addition they won worldwide fame through their hundreds of Victor Red Seal records. He returned to the Hotel New Yorker after the Roseland booking. United Artists had the movie "Coquette" with Mary Pickford at Loew's Palace the week of April 15, 1929. Tal Henry was billed with Mary Pickford on stage with "Coquette." Thomas Meighan played with Mary Pickford in early movies with no sound. Tal Henry and his North Carolinians provided the musical accompaniment.

During the Great Depression, many of the famous musicians disbanded the bands and began to look for work or to make a comeback if they could raise the funds for recruiting more musicians. Tal Henry did not disband the orchestra until 1938. At that time, he became the agent and manager for some of the fallen bands and musicians. Some famous names were Lionel Hampton, Randy Brooks, Ian Ray Hutton, Nat "King" Cole, and Larry Clinton. When the World War II began, Fred Waring and Kay Kyser wrote to Special Services in the Army, suggesting Tal Henry become the European Director of Music Theatre. In 1944 through 1946 Tal was traveling England, France, Belgium, Germany, Italy, Switzerland and the French Riviera. He produced some of the USO and Radio City Music Hall productions where he checked on other production too. Tal Henry was with Glenn Miller on the day he left an airport outside London to fly to Paris. That plane was lost in the fog of the English Channel and Glenn Miller never made it to his destination in Paris, where the members of his band were waiting for his arrival. After the war was over Tal Henry returned home and began to play in the King Cotton Hotel with an organist on occasions. He also performed with the North Carolina Symphony.

== Legacy ==
In 1995, long after the death of Tal Henry, UCLA Festival of Preservation began to appoint actors and donors to restore old movies and Vitaphone Films to be screened in the UCLA Auditorium where the media, actors, families of the producers and associates could view the films. On April 30, 1995, the Tal Henry, Jr family received an invitation to the screening of Tal Henry's Warner Bros. Victor Recording Company Vitaphone Short film for the first time showing in Hollywood. Sara and Tal Henry, Jr. attended the screening where Tal, Jr. was introduced as the only living relative present at the event. The Tal Henry family were honored guest on February 3, 1998, as the late Tal Henry was inductee (posthumously) while the Tal Henry, Jr family became charter members of the Palm Beach Big Band Hall of Fame Museum. Later, memorabilia was placed in the University of Pacific by Dave Brubeck and the UCLA Vitaphone Film was placed into the Movie Image Museum in Astoria, NY.

== Discography ==
April 25, 1928 Recordings List by Victor Record Co. Camden, NJ. "My Song of Songs to You" Shaw, (vocal) "Why Do You Make Me Lonesome?" (vocal) "Some Little Someone" – Brown, Morris, Shaw, (Vocal) "You've Broken My Castle of Dreams"

May 22, 1928 "Louise, I Love You"... "I'd Trade My Air Castles For A Love Nest And You"... "Lonesome"

December 5, 1928 "Just You and I" – Madsen, (Vocal)... "Found My Gal" – Brown, Fellman, Morris, (Vocal)... "I Know Why I Think of You" – Madsen, (Vocal) "When Shadows Fall" ... "Shame On You" – Brown, Fellman, Morris, (Vocal)... "My Little Old Home Down In New Orleans"

February 7, 1934 By Bluebird and Sunrise "Dancing In the Moonlight" – Wolter, (Vocal) By Bluebird ... "Dancing In the Moonlight" – Wolter, (Vocal) By Sunrise ... "Carioca" (Rumba) By Bluebird ... "Carioca" (Rumba) By Sunrise ... "There Goes My Heart" – Wolter, (Vocal) By Bluebird ... "There Goes My Heart" – Wolter, (Vocal) By Sunrise ... "Don't Say Goodnight" – Shaw, (Vocal) By Bluebird ... "Don't Say Goodnight" – Shaw, (Vocal) By Sunrise ... "Goin' To Heaven On A Mule" (Vocal?) By Bluebird ... "Goin' To Heaven On A Mule" (Vocal?) By Sunrise ... "I Can't Go On Like This" – Wolter (Vocal) By Bluebird ... "I Can't Go On Like This" – Wolter (Vocal) By Sunrise.

"I Know Why I Think Of You" Words: Hank Hauser Music: Tal Henry 12/7/29 EUnp 14155

"Just You and I" Words: Walter Fellman Music: Tal Henry 6/3/29 EUnp 7413

"Shame on You" Words: Ivan Morris Music: Tal Henry 12/7/29 EUnp 14158

"Louise" Words: Hank Hauser Music: Tal Henry

"Why Do You Make Me Lonesome" Words: I. Morris, F. Ellsworth Music: Tal Henry

"Skirts" Words: Tal Henry and Guy Funk Date: 1923 Music: Tal Henry and Guy Funk Copyright: 1924

Warner Bros. Victor Recording Vitaphone Film 1928
