= Jean Veloz =

American dancer and actress (1924–2023)

- Born: Jean Grinnell Phelps; March 1, 1924; Los Angeles, California, U.S.
- Died: January 15, 2023 (aged 98); Los Angeles, California, U.S.
- Occupations: Actress; dancer
- Years active: 1943–2020
- Spouses: Harold Davi (m. 1947, divorced); Frank Veloz (m. 1963; died 1981)

Jean Grinnell Veloz (née Phelps, March 1, 1924 – January 15, 2023) was an American lindy hop dancer and actress, best known for her roles in 1940s and 1950s musicals. She innovated a style of swing dance that was "silky smooth", now known as "Hollywood style" contrasting the more jitterbug style prevalent during the 1930s-1940s.

== Early life ==
Jean Grinnell Phelps was born in Los Angeles, California, on March 1, 1924 as the second of three children. She was raised in Santa Maria, California by her mother, who encouraged Veloz's early interest in dance. As a child, Phelps practiced lindy hop dance with her brothers and their friends. She later won a jitterbug competition with her brother, Raymond, in Santa Monica against more than 500 other participants.

== Career ==
After winning a dance contest at the Hollywood Legion Stadium, Phelps earned herself a Screen Actors Guild card and a role in the musical comedy Swing Fever (1943) at age 19, dancing opposite swing dancers portraying servicemen.

Other credits include Where Are Your Children? (1943), Jive Junction (1943), and The Horn Blows at Midnight (1945). Veloz also appeared with Arthur Walsh in Groovie Movie (1944), a short film depicting the history of swing dance.

She continued to work on and off throughout a long career. For example, in 2017, Veloz appeared on NBC on Little Big Shots hosted by Steve Harvey, where she danced to "One Girl and Two Boys". At age 95, Veloz danced at the Spanish Ballroom in Glen Echo Park and at the Rock That Swing festival in Munich.

== Personal life and death ==
In 1947, Phelps married Harold Davi, but the two later divorced. In 1963, she married her dance partner Frank Veloz, of Veloz and Yolanda. They remained together until his death in 1981. She had no children, with her only survivor being her niece, Stacey.

Veloz died at her home in Los Angeles on January 15, 2023, at the age of 98, after suffering from declining health.
