= That's Right – You're Wrong =

1939 film by David Butler

- Theatrical poster
- Directed by: David Butler
- Written by: David Butler; William M. Conselman
- Produced by: David Butler; Fred Fleck (assistant)
- Starring: Kay Kyser; Adolphe Menjou; Lucille Ball; Dennis O'Keefe
- Cinematography: Russell Metty
- Edited by: Irene Morra
- Music by: Roy Webb
- Distributed by: RKO Radio Pictures
- Release date: November 24, 1939 (U.S.)
- Running time: 94 minutes
- Country: United States
- Language: English
- Budget: $271,000
- Box office: $1,018,000

That's Right – You're Wrong is a 1939 American musical film directed by David Butler and released by RKO Radio Pictures. The film stars Kay Kyser and his band, with a cast that included Adolphe Menjou, Lucille Ball, Edward Everett Horton, Roscoe Karns, and Ginny Simms (as herself). It was the first film to feature Kyser and his band, and its success led to their headlining several more pictures over the next five years. The title was a Kyser catchphrase, used on his radio show when a contestant correctly gave a wrong answer to a "right or wrong" question.

== Plot ==
Four Star Studios is suffering a slump at the box office, and studio head Forbes, noting the enormous popularity of Kyser's band on radio and in concert, decides to sign them up to star in a movie. But to the band's disappointment, Kyser turns down the offer, believing he should "stay in his own backyard." Their manager, Deems, manages to change his mind, and they head off to Hollywood. Upon arrival, they're greeted by their producer, Delmore, and fast-talking press agent Stamp. Deems has rented an enormous house for them to live in, which upsets the thrifty Kyser until he finds that his beloved Grandma has been brought out to live in and run the place.

At the studio, things quickly take a bad turn, as top screenwriters Village and Cook realize that Kyser's unprepossessing looks and personality don't exactly fit the mold of the dashing romantic lead most movies require. After over 40 failed attempts to come up with an acceptable story, they tell Delmore it's hopeless. Fearful of being fired, the producer figures the only way out of this situation is to get Kyser to quit. He tells the bandleader that his girl, vocalist Ginny, will be replaced by rising star Sandra Sand. It appears to do the trick until the writers, feeling sorry for putting Kyser in this spot, concoct a way for him to put a monkey wrench in Delmore's scheme.

== Cast ==
- Kay Kyser as Kay Kyser
- Adolphe Menjou as Stacey Delmore
- May Robson as Grandma
- Lucille Ball as Sandra Sand
- Dennis O'Keefe as Chuck Deems, the Band Manager
- Edward Everett Horton as Tom Village, a Screenwriter
- Roscoe Karns as Mal Stamp
- Moroni Olsen as Jonathan 'J.D.' Forbes
- Hobart Cavanaugh as Dwight Cook, a Screenwriter
- Kay Kyser Band as Kay Kyser's Band (as Kay Kyser's Band)
- Ginny Simms as Ginny Simms – Band Singer
- Harry Babbitt as Harry Babbitt
- Sully Mason as Sully Mason
- Merwyn Bogue as Ish Kabibble
- Hedda Hopper as herself
- Sheilah Graham as herself
- Erskine Johnson as himself
- Harrison Carroll as himself
- Feg Murray as himself
- Charles Judels as Luigi

== Music ==
In addition to Kay Kyser's theme song, "(I’ve Grown So Lonely) Thinking of You" (music and lyrics by Walter Donaldson and Paul Ash), the movie included the following songs:

- "The Answer is Love" (music by Sam H. Stept, lyrics by Charles Newmansung, sung by Ginny Simms, Harry Babbitt, and Sully Mason, with a guest appearance by Ish Kabibble)
- "Chatterbox" (music by Jerome (Jerry) Brainin, lyrics by Allan Roberts)
- "California, Here I Come" (written by Al Jolson, Buddy G. DeSylva, and Joseph Meyer)
- "The Little Red Fox" (sung by Ginny Simms)
- "The Volga Boatman"
- "Happy Birthday to Love" (music and lyrics by Dave Franklin, sung by Ginny Simms)
- "Fit to be Tied" (music and lyrics by Walter Donaldson)
- "My Mammy" (music by Walter Donaldson, lyrics by Sam Lewis and Joe Young)

== Reception ==
The film was popular and earned a profit of $219,000.
