= Kay Kyser =

American bandleader and radio personality (1905–1985)

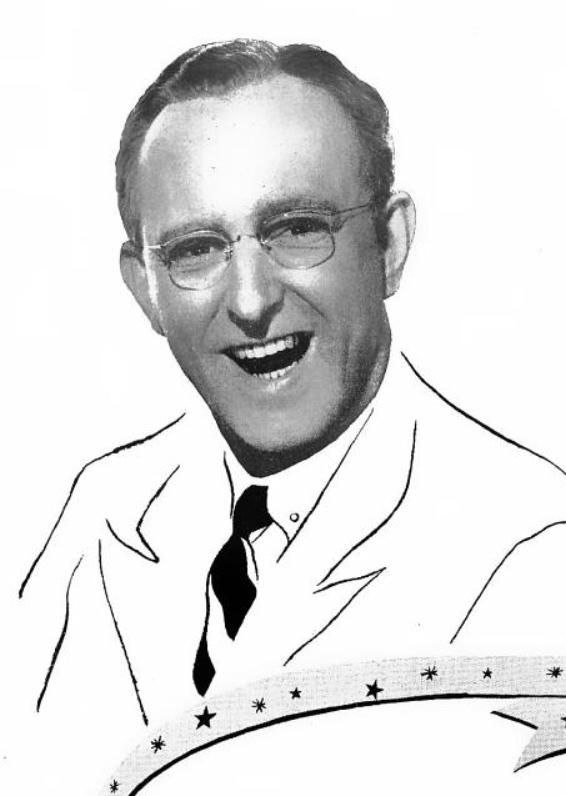
- Kyser in 1944

Background information
- Born: James Kern Kyser; June 18, 1905; Rocky Mount, North Carolina, U.S.
- Died: July 23, 1985 (aged 80) Chapel Hill, North Carolina, U.S.
- Genres: Big band, swing, jazz
- Occupations: Vocalist, bandleader
- Years active: 1926–1950
- Spouse: Georgia Carroll

James Kern Kyser (June 18, 1905 – July 23, 1985), known as Kay Kyser, was an American bandleader and radio personality of the 1930s and 1940s.

== Early years ==
Kyser was born in Rocky Mount, North Carolina, the son of Emily Royster Kyser (née Howell) and Paul Bynum Kyser, who were pharmacists. He was one of six children, and his mother was the first registered female pharmacist in the state. Journalist and newspaper editor Vermont C. Royster was his cousin. Kyser graduated from the University of North Carolina at Chapel Hill with a Bachelor of Arts degree in 1928, where he was senior class president and was a member of Sigma Nu fraternity.

Owing to his popularity and enthusiasm as a cheerleader, he was invited by Hal Kemp to take over as bandleader when Kemp ventured north to further his career. He began taking clarinet lessons but was better as an entertaining announcer than a musician. He adopted the initial of his middle name as part of his stage name, for its alliterative effect.

== Career ==
=== Kay Kyser's Kollege of Musical Knowledge ===
See main article, Kay Kyser's Kollege of Musical Knowledge.

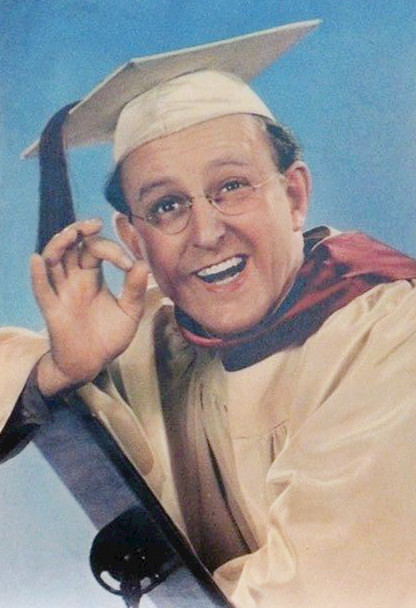
Kyser as the "Ol' Perfessor" in 1942

Long before his national success, Kyser recorded two sessions for Victor in the late 1920s (Camden, New Jersey in November 1928 and Chicago in early 1929). These were issued on Victor's V-40000 series devoted to country music and regional dance bands. Following graduation, Kyser and his band, which included Sully Mason on saxophone and arranger George Duning, toured Midwest restaurants and night clubs and gradually built a following.

They were popular at Chicago's Blackhawk restaurant, where Kyser came up with an act combining a quiz with music which became "Kay Kyser's Kollege of Musical Knowledge." The act was broadcast on the Mutual Broadcasting System in 1938 and then moved to NBC Radio from 1939 to 1949. The show rose in the ratings and spawned many imitators. Kyser led the band as "The Ol' Perfessor", spouting catchphrases, some with a degree of Southern American English: "That's right—you're wrong", "Evenin' folks, how y'all?" and "C'mon, chillun! Le's dance!"

=== Big band era ===
Although Kyser and his orchestra gained fame through the "Kollege of Musical Knowledge," they were a successful band in their own right. They had 11 number one records, including some of the most popular songs of the late 1930s and early 1940s.

Unlike most other big bands of the era, which centered on only the bandleader, individual members of Kyser's band became stars in their own right and would often receive the spotlight. Some of the more popular members included vocalist Harry Babbitt, cornetist Merwyn Bogue (a.k.a. Ish Kabibble), trombonist Bruce King, saxophonist Jack Martin (who sang lead vocal on the number one hit, "Strip Polka"), Ginny Simms (who had her own successful acting and singing career after leaving Kyser's band), Sully Mason, Mike Douglas (years before he became a popular TV talk show host) and Georgia Carroll.

Carroll, a blonde fashion model and actress whose best-known role was Betsy Ross in Yankee Doodle Dandy, was dubbed "Gorgeous Georgia Carroll" when she joined the group in 1943. Within a year, she and Kyser married.

Kyser was also known for singing song titles, a device copied by Sammy Kaye and Blue Barron. When the song began, one of the band's lead singers (usually Babbitt) sang the title phrase, and then the first verse or two of the song was performed instrumentally before the lyrics resumed. Several of his recordings spawned catch phrases, such as "Praise the Lord and Pass the Ammunition".

His group had a major hit with the novelty tune, "Three Little Fishes". It sold over one million copies, and was awarded a gold disc by the RIAA.

During the Swing Era, Kyser, Hal Kemp and Tal Henry often performed in or near New York City, making possible a reunion of North Carolina musicians. Later, after retirement, Kyser and Henry got together to share music world memories.

Inspired by Rosalind P. Walter, Kyser helped popularize the song "Rosie the Riveter".

His Top Hits
The Umbrella Man (vocals by Ginny Simms & Harry Babbitt) (1939)
Three Little Fishes (vocals by Ginny Simms & Harry Babbitt)(1939)
(Lights Out) 'Til Reveille (vocals by Ginny Simms, Harry Babbitt. Max Williams & Jack Martin)(1941)
(There'll Be Bluebirds Over) The White Cliffs of Dover (vocals by Harry Babbitt & Glee Club) (1941)
Who Wouldn't Love You (vocals by Trudy Erwin & Harry Babbitt) (1942)
Jingle, Jangle, Jingle (vocal by Julie Conway & Harry Babbitt) (1942)
He Wears a Pair of Silver Wings (vocal by Harry Babbitt) (1942)
Strip Polka (vocal by Jack Martin) (1942)
Praise the Lord and Pass the Ammunition (vocal by Glee Club) (1942)
Ole Buttermilk Sky (vocal by Mike Douglas & Campus Kids) (1946)
Woody Woodpecker (vocal By Gloria Wood & Campus Kids) (1948)

See also Kay Kyser's Greatest Hits

=== Movies ===
During the late 1930s and early 1940s, Kyser's band appeared in several motion pictures, usually as themselves, beginning with the successful That's Right – You're Wrong (1939), You'll Find Out (1940), Playmates and My Favorite Spy. Some of the films built a plot around the band. Around the World (1943) fictionalized the band's international tours of military camps.

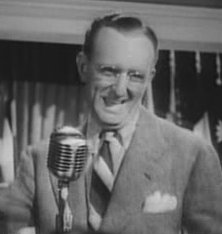
Kyser in Stage Door Canteen (1943)

In Carolina Blues (1944), Kyser has to replace his lead singer (Carroll) who has run off to get married. Caught in a jam, he reluctantly hires the daughter of a powerful defense plant owner, played by Ann Miller. Two of the band's best-known performance appearances were in 1943 when they appeared in the wartime films Stage Door Canteen and Thousands Cheer. Kyser appeared as a light comedian; he acted with (and was billed above) John Barrymore in Barrymore's final film Playmates (1941). Kyser is the dupe in a scam where Barrymore pretends to teach him how to act in Shakespearean drama.

Kyser also appeared in a Porky Pig cartoon, Africa Squeaks (1940). In the cartoon, he voiced a caricature of himself called "Cake-Icer," at the request of director Bob Clampett. A caricature (unnamed) of Kyser as the "Lil Perfessor" was seen in the Warner Brothers cartoon Malibu Beach Party.

After the war, Kyser's band continued to record hit records, including two featuring Jane Russell as vocalist. It's All Up to You features vocals by Frank Sinatra and Dinah Shore, although Kyser's participation in this recording is disputed, record label showing Axel Stordahl as conductor. Kyser had intended to retire following the end of the war, but performance and recording contracts kept him in show business for another half decade.

During this time, Kyser made a cameo appearance in a Batman comic book. Kyser was first to introduce the new sonic audio process called the 'sonovox', a singing electronic voice triggered by music. The Sonovox would be used by Jingle Companies such as PAMS and JAM Creative Productions, and said jingles would be used in heavy rotation by rock radio stations such as WABC, WMEX, WXYZ, KONO, WKDA, and WHTZ.

=== Television ===
In 1949 and 1950, "Kay Kyser's Kollege of Musical Knowledge" aired on NBC-TV. In addition to Kyser, the TV show featured Ish Kabibble and vocalists Mike Douglas, Sue Bennett and Liza Palmer, plus The Honeydreamers vocal group and the dance team of Diane Sinclair and Ken Spaulding. Ben Grauer was the announcer during the first season. Always the businessman, Kyser reunited his band especially for this series and just as quickly disbanded it when the show ended. After a four-year hiatus, the "Kollege of Musical Knowledge" was revived by Tennessee Ernie Ford, prior to the launching of his own NBC program, The Ford Show, which ran from 1956 to 1961.

=== Radio (non-musical) ===
Kyser and Ginny Simms co-starred in "Niagara to Reno" (described as "an original comedy") on CBS radio's Silver Theater April 6, 1941.

== Post-musical career ==
After retiring from music, Kyser became involved with his church, The First Church of Christ, Scientist. When he was a child, his mother turned to a Christian Science practitioner for healing while apparently on her deathbed. In 1932, Kay recalled her recovery and turned to a practitioner himself while feeling the need for spiritual guidance; the practitioner encouraged him to continue with music, so he could use his talents to help people relieve tension in their lives. Kyser recalled: "I felt so healed that I quit worrying about it and for the next 18 years I couldn't think of anything except how to make better records and how to make the music more danceable. ... Underlying that was the unquenchable desire to serve mankind's needs." In the 1940s, he began to experience his own health problems, which at times confined him to a wheelchair, and he turned to the religion in earnest; becoming a practitioner himself in 1961, a teacher of Christian Science a few years afterwards, and in 1974 working at the church's headquarters in Boston directing its radio and television broadcasting. In the late 70s and early 80s he traveled around as a Christian Science lecturer, and in 1983, he became the church's president, a one-year position which he referred to as "honorary", joking that he hadn't "been elected Pope or anything".

Kyser supported various philanthropic causes after his retirement from music including health care, educational television, and highway safety. Kyser supported the construction of a wing in St. John's hospital in Santa Monica, and there is a portrait of him at the entrance of its medical library. He also helped raise $62 million to build more hospitals and train nurses in his home state of North Carolina, lobbied the state legislature, and had his entertainment friends including Frank Sinatra and Dinah Shore do a commercial in support of expanding healthcare in the state. Kyser also supported his old school, University of North Carolina at Chapel Hill, especially the arts, through the Kyser Foundation which gave scholarships to UNC music and drama students; and supported the university's theatre, pharmacy school, and its Center for Public Television. He also gave to the North Carolina Symphony Society, the first state symphony orchestra in the country.

In 1962, several members of the Kay Kyser team (including Babbit, Kabibble, and Simms but not Kyser himself) reunited at Capitol Records to record an album of new versions of Kyser's greatest hits. Comedian Stan Freberg, one of Capitol's regular artists, did an impression of Kay's original song introductions.

== Family ==
Kyser and Georgia Carroll remained married until his death. They moved back to Kyser's home state of North Carolina where they lived in his uncle's old house, the oldest house in Chapel Hill, and raised their three daughters – Amanda, Carroll, and Kimberly, who all graduated from his alma mater, the University of North Carolina at Chapel Hill.

== Death ==
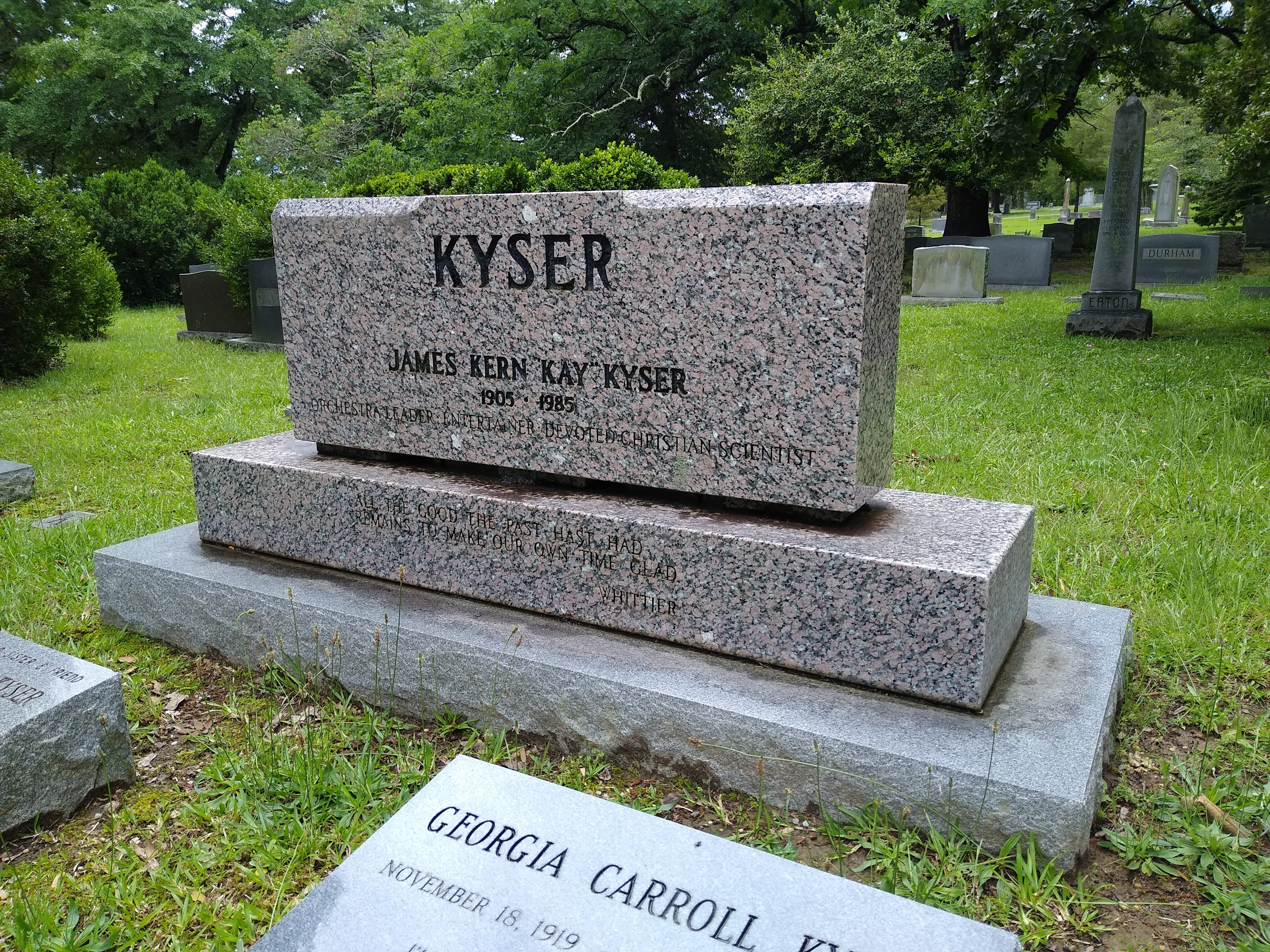
Kyser's gravestone

Kyser died of a heart attack in Chapel Hill, North Carolina on July 23, 1985. He was 80. He is buried at Old Chapel Hill Cemetery in Chapel Hill.

== Legacy ==
Kyser was inducted into the Radio Hall of Fame in 1990.

Kyser was inducted into the North Carolina Music Hall of Fame in 1999.

The University of North Carolina at Chapel Hill is custodian of a large archive of documents and material about Kyser which was donated by his widow and made available to the public on April 8, 2008.

== Noted sidemen and vocalists ==
- Source: "Kay Kyser the Ol' Professor of Swing". Yess Dance Productions.

- Harry Babbitt (1913–2004), baritone singer
- Jack Barrow, trombone player
- Noni Bernardi (1911–2006), aka Ernani Bernardi, alto sax. Member of the Los Angeles City Council
- Georgia Carroll (1919–2011), vocalist who married Kyser
- Mike Douglas (1920–2006), vocalist, host of the 1961-1982 The Mike Douglas Show
- George Duning (1908–2000), musician and film composer
- Trudy Erwin (1918–2000), vocalist
- Lyman Gandee, pianist
- Herman "Heinie"Gunkler, jazz clarinetist, aka Hymie Gunkler
- Bobby Guy, trumpet player
- Roc Hillman, guitarist and composer
- Ish Kabibble (1908–1994), comedian and cornet player
- Jack Martin, vocalist and tenor sax player
- Sully Mason (1906–1970), vocalist and alto sax player
- Rosy McHargue (1902–1999), clarinetist
- Ginny Simms (1913–1994), vocalist, actress
- Bill "Smilin'" Stoker, clarinet, tenor sax, vocalist
- Gloria Wood (1923–1995), vocalist and voice-over actress
- Art Wilson, vocalist
- Arthur Wright, vocalist

== Selected filmography ==
- Carolina Blues (1944)
- Around the World (1943)
- Swing Fever (1943)
- Thousands Cheer (1943)
- Stage Door Canteen (1943)
- My Favorite Spy (1942)
- Playmates (1941)
- You'll Find Out (1940)
- That's Right – You're Wrong (1939)
