= Strip Polka =

1942 song by Johnny Mercer

"Strip Polka" is a 1942 novelty song with music and lyrics by Johnny Mercer. The music incorporates a polka beat; the lyrics are about Queenie, a burlesque performer who longs to quit her job and retire to life on a farm.

Its use in the film Navy Blues (1941) was prevented as a result of Joseph Breen's memorandum to Jack Warner regarding the low moral tone of the lyrics.

The first recording of "Strip Polka", which featured the vocals of Mercer, Phil Silvers, and Margaret Whiting, with piano by Jimmy Van Heusen, and an arrangement by Paul Weston, was a significant early hit (charting at number seven) for Capitol Records, selling more than a million copies.

The recording by the Andrews Sisters came in at number two on Variety's list of bestselling songs despite censors only allowing the song to play on the radio for 9 or 10 weeks. A version by Alvino Rey was popular.

The song was popular with U.S. troops during World War II.

A partial version of the song can be heard in the first Private Snafu cartoon, sung by Mel Blanc.

== Recordings ==
- Johnny Mercer with Phil Silvers, Margaret Whiting, and Jimmy Van Heusen (Capitol, 1942)
- Kay Kyser with vocals by Jack Martin (Columbia, 1942; Capitol, 1962)
- The Andrews Sisters (Decca, 1942)
- Alvino Rey with vocals by The Four King Sisters (Bluebird, 1942)

== In other media ==
- Elke Sommer on The Dean Martin Show in 1969.
- In Faces (1968)
- Island at War episode "Unusual Successes"
