= Anne Taintor =

American collage artist

- Born: Anne Marie Taintor; August 16, 1953 (age 72); Lewiston, Maine, U.S.
- Education: Harvard University
- Occupation: Artist

Anne Taintor (born August 16, 1953) is an American collage artist. Her work, often derived from cuttings of 1950s advertisements from publications such as Ladies Home Journal and Life, juxtaposes these images with witty tongue-in-cheek captions. She has been credited by some as being a pioneer of the trend of pairing of mid-century imagery with modern slogans.

== Biography and work ==
Taintor was born in 1953 in Lewiston, Maine to Frederick G. and Jane S. Taintor. Her father was a lawyer and her mother was a law school graduate turned housewife. She is the second of five children and lives in Portland, Maine, having returned to her home state after spending 11 years in New Mexico.

After graduating from Lewiston High School in 1971, Taintor attended Harvard University, from which she graduated in 1977 with a degree in Visual and Environmental Studies. As a student she enrolled in a class on collage animation, which would become her technique of choice. Upon leaving Harvard, she eventually moved back to Maine working as, among other things, a cartographer drawing maps for state atlases. She continued to collage, selling her works at local craft fairs.

In the early 1980s, Taintor bounced around in different jobs, including as a waitress and a seamstress, while also working her way through a divorce. At that time, she began focusing more on creating and selling her collages as a way to support herself and her daughter. Her first products were handmade wooden lapel pins and earrings with collage artwork, which she created by cutting and pasting artwork from 1940s and 1950s advertisements.

== Anne Taintor, Inc. ==
In 1985, while at a garage sale in South Portland, Maine, Taintor came across an old Ladies Home Journal, which prompted her to begin creating what would become her signature work. Her first piece of this kind, Intellectuals Gone Bad, was sold at the Maine Festival, an annual performance and crafts fair held in Portland, Maine, and featured an image of a woman and a man mixed with the caption "intellectuals gone bad". It was well received and, soon after, she started Anne Taintor, Inc.
