= Praise the Lord and Pass the Ammunition =

American patriotic song by Frank Loesser

Song
- Published: 1942 by Famous Music
- Genre: American patriotic song
- Songwriter: Frank Loesser

"Praise the Lord and Pass the Ammunition" is an American patriotic song by Frank Loesser, published as sheet music in 1942 by Famous Music Corp. The song was a response to the attack on Pearl Harbor that marked United States involvement in World War II.

The song describes a chaplain ("sky pilot") who is with a group of soldiers under attack by enemy planes. The chaplain puts down his Bible, mans one of the ship's gun turrets and begins firing back, saying, "Praise the Lord and pass the ammunition".

== Origin ==
According to writer Jack S. McDowell, the famous phrase is generally credited to "a chaplain," said to be manning the guns of a ship under attack. "This was not true," says McDowell. For some time, long after Pearl Harbor, stories and reports surfaced about an incident involving this apocryphal "sky pilot", who was said to have uttered the words "Praise the Lord and pass the ammunition".

The stories eventually made their way through the servicemen and back to the press. This, as McDowell noted, led some writers to erroneously identify other chaplains as author of the phrase. Nonetheless, the real chaplain, LTJG Howell M. Forgy, was aboard the USS New Orleans during the Japanese attack.

Lieutenant Edwin F. Woodhead, who was the officer in charge of an ammunition line on the USS New Orleans later recounted that during the attack, "I heard a voice behind me saying, 'Praise the Lord and pass the ammunition.' I turned and saw Chaplain Forgy walking toward me, along the line of men. He was patting them on the back and making that remark to cheer and keep them going. I know it helped me a lot, too."

Another lieutenant said that thereafter, when the men heard the song, they would kid Chaplain Forgy about the role he played, encouraging him to set the record straight about who actually said what. According to the same officer the chaplain would decline, modestly claiming he felt, "... the episode should remain a legend, rather than be associated with any particular person." Author McDowell noted that reporters eventually were permitted to interview the men of the USS New Orleans involved in the "ammunition" story. Chaplain Forgy's superior officers set up a meeting with members of the press and at last, the real story of the song and the man who had inspired it was confirmed.

According to the Pittsburgh Post-Gazette article of January 1, 1943, the origin of the quote may well have been John Ford's 1939 film Drums Along the Mohawk.

== Popularization ==
The song became extremely popular despite Loesser's belief that "Americans did not want a true war song." The song made Variety's best seller list for three months and sold over 450,000 copies in only two months.

According to his obituary in The New York Times of August 8, 1974, the singer who introduced the song to a popular audience was Robert Rounseville.

Based on the title of the song and the events that inspired it, American Brandywine artist Walter De Maris (1877–1947) produced a painting of a Pilgrim who has just been shot at with an arrow reaching for his musket.

In 1942, a recording by The Merry Macs reached number 8 on the Billboard chart, and a version by The Jubalaires reached #10 on the R&B chart on November 14 of the same year. The 1942 version by Kay Kyser and His Orchestra reached number 1. A portion of the tune is sung while in the Superman cartoon "Jungle Drums" Hitler bows his head from news that Allied forces cut off a major assault of German U-boats. Loesser donated his royalties for sale of the song to the Navy Relief Society.

In later years, the expression has often been used in a satirical manner. In the Larry Peerce movie The Incident, a character reminiscing about his army days quotes the phrase to his fiancée Ruby Dee (a black woman involved in the non-violent civil rights movement) to advocate the more militant attitude he claims would be a better way to assert the rights of African-Americans. The quote has also been referenced in Loudon Wainwright III's song "Ready or Not (So Ripe)" on his 1985 album I'm Alright and in the Chicks' song "Sin Wagon" on their 1999 album Fly.

In the 2005 film Man of the House, Texas Ranger Roland Sharp, called on to deliver an inspirational speech at the Hex Rally before the Texas A&M game, concludes his extemporaneous talk with the words, "Praise the Lord and pass the ammunition!", to the cheers of the crowd.

== See also ==
- God helps those who help themselves
- Trust in God and keep your powder dry
