= Jingle Jangle Jingle =

1942 song by Joseph J. Lilley and Frank Loesser

Song by Kay Kyser
- Published: 1942
- Genre: Western music, standard
- Composer: Joseph J. Lilley
- Lyricist: Frank Loesser

"Jingle Jangle Jingle", also known as "I've Got Spurs That Jingle Jangle Jingle", is a song written by Joseph J. Lilley and Frank Loesser, and published in 1942. It was featured in that year's film The Forest Rangers.

The most commercially successful recording was by Kay Kyser, whose version reached no. 1 in the Billboard charts in July 1942. Versions were recorded by many other musicians, including Tex Ritter, Gene Autry, Glenn Miller and The Merry Macs.

Members of the Western Writers of America chose it as one of the Top 100 Western songs of all time.

== Popular culture ==
The song was featured in the 1943 World War II-era theatrical Popeye the Sailor short Too Weak to Work, and was also sung by The Sportsmen Quartet: Bill Days (top tenor), Max Smith (second tenor), Mart Sperzel (baritone), and Gurney Bell (bass), in the 1942 western movie Lost Canyon with Hopalong Cassidy (Bill Boyd).

The song features in a 1946 cowboy-themed Castle Films soundie titled "Jingle Jangle Jingle" featuring Dick Thomas. It was also featured in the Famous Studios Kartunes series, in a short entitled Snooze Reel, where audiences were invited to sing along.

The 1942 Kay Kyser Orchestra version (feat. Harry Babbitt) is featured in the 2010 Obsidian Entertainment video game Fallout: New Vegas on the in-game radio. Games studies researcher Andra Ivănescu compares the "cheery sounds" of "Jingle Jangle Jingle" and the player committing "unspeakable atrocities" in Fallout: New Vegas to the use of "Stuck in the Middle with You" in the torture scene from Quentin Tarantino's 1992 film Reservoir Dogs."

== See also ==
- List of number-one singles of 1942 (U.S.)
