= Gloria Wood =

American singer and voice actress

- Born: September 8, 1923; Medford, Massachusetts, U.S.
- Died: March 4, 1995 (aged 71) Los Angeles, California
- Occupations: Singer, voice actress
- Years active: 1941–1995

Gloria Wood (September 8, 1923 – March 4, 1995) was an American singer and voice actress. Her rare voice was in the four-octave range. She was able to imitate other voices.

== Background and career ==
Born in Medford, Massachusetts in 1923, her father was Robert E. Wood, a Boston radio singer in the 1920s, who with wife Gertrude Anderson-Wood, was the influence which had encouraged both Gloria and her older sister Donna to cultivate their vocal skills. Shortly after leaving high school in 1941, Gloria joined Donna in The Horace Heidt Band. In 1947, Kay Kyser offered Gloria the emotional problem of replacing Donna in his Campus Kids vocal group when she died on April 8, 1947, at the age of 29. Wood also became the lead singer for Kyser on occasion and enjoyed several hits. She became a member of The Rhythmaires vocal group which worked with Bing Crosby for nearly ten years. Crosby would occasionally showcase her apart from the group, such as on the Philco shows of March 17 and 31, 1948 when, in their duet, she reprised her Kyser success, "Saturday Date." They sang another of her Kyser hits, "On a Slow Boat to China" on Philco June 1, 1949. She can also be heard on Crosby's 1950 recording and subsequent air checks of "Rudolph the Red Nosed Reindeer," where she supplies the voice of Rudolph. Her recording of "The Woody Woodpecker Song" with Kyser's orchestra sold more than 4 million copies.

Wood also had an extensive film career as a ghost singer, her earliest venture in this field being in Diamond Horseshoe (1945). Uncredited, she is the voice of Adele Jergens in The Bowery Boys movie, Blues Busters (1950); and one of the voices (with Trudy Stevens) of Vera-Ellen in White Christmas (1954). Twice she was a partial stand-in for Marilyn Monroe in River of No Return (also 1954) and Let's Make Love (1960). She appears in Gaby (1956) singing "Where or When," and sang for one of the twins in The Parent Trap (1961), Ladyfish in The Incredible Mr. Limpet and Lucille Ball's young nephew in Mame (1974).

Wood recorded more than 2,500 singing commercials both on radio and television. One of the best known of these was for Rice-A-Roni (...the San Francisco treat); but she may be best remembered as the voice of the orbiting Tinker Bell in the Peter Pan peanut butter ads. Wood was used on numerous cartoons, beginning in Walter Lantz's Wet Blanket Policy (1948), where she was heard singing the Woody Woodpecker Song. On television, Wood supplied voices for The Bugs and Daffy Show and That's Warner Bros.!; as well as that of Minnie Mouse and other characters on several Walt Disney programs. Wood married in 1955, and it was around this time that she joined The Johnny Mann Singers.

Wood died on March 4, 1995, from complications of diabetes. At that time, she was known as Gloria Wood-McGeorge, and was buried at Forest Lawn Memorial Park (Glendale).

== Cartoon voices ==
- Rudolph the Red-Nosed Reindeer (on records)
- Looney Tunes cartoon characters
- Tinker Bell on Peter Pan (peanut butter) TV commercials
- Minnie Mouse (Disney)
- Susie Sparrow (Disney)
- Nelly the Singing Giraffe (Warner Brothers)
- Helen Kane and Patty Andrews in A Symposium on Popular Songs (Disney)

== History and discography ==
- 1941: Gloria's mother, a pop singer on Boston radio in the mid-1920s, sent Gloria into big band singing from high school.
- 1940s: Wood sings with band leader Kay Kyser.
- 1948: "On a Slow Boat to China" – Kay Kyser, Harry Babbitt & Gloria Wood
- 1948: First sings The Woody Woodpecker Song in Wet Blanket Policy cartoon.
- 1948: So Dear to My Heart (Disney Live Action/Animated Film; chorus)
- 1949: The Adventures of Ichabod and Mr. Toad (Disney Animated Film, "The Headless Horseman"; chorus)
- 1950: Wood is the uncredited singing voice of Adele Jergens in the comedy film Blues Busters. She sings "Joshua Fit the Battle of Jericho", and "Better Be Lookin' Out for Love".
- 1951: Alice in Wonderland (Disney Animated Film; chorus)
- 1953: Peter Pan (Disney Animated Film; chorus)
- 1953: Toot, Whistle, Plunk and Boom (Disney Animated Short) Susie Sparrow
- 1953: Recording of "Hey Bellboy"; eventually sells 1 million copies.
- 1953: The Band Wagon (film musical) singer in "That's Entertainment" sequence (uncredited)
- 1954: Dubbed singing voice for Marilyn Monroe in the movie River of No Return.
- 1954: Dubbed singing voice for Vera-Ellen in the movie White Christmas.
- mid-1950s: Wood sings an LP of romantic ballads for Columbia.
- 1955 to 1958: In only three years, Wood worked on more than 2,000 singing commercials.
- 1956: Gaby – Singer at the Bottle Club and performer in "Where Or When"
- 1957: Zephyr Records releases the 45 rpm single Scoundrel Blues / Sabourin.
  - 1957: Zephyr Records releases the 45 rpm single Someday Soon / Lullabye in Blue.
- 1957: Wood is the Singing Bride in The Jack Benny Program (TV series) and in Goodwin Knight/George Jessel Show.
- 1957: Zorro (Live Action Series) Singing barmaid in "Death Stacks the Deck"
- 1957: Sings on You're my one and only love by Ricky Nelson.
- late 1950s: Wood heads up a choir in Disney record/s.
- late 1950s: Along with Stan Freberg, Wood plays cartoon voices in TV commercials, including the Rice-A-Roni TV commercial jingle.
- late 1950s: Performs cartoon voices in cartoons and for record albums.
- 1959: Background vocals on Mark Murphy's Hip Parade.
- 1960: featured vocalist on Pete Rugolo's album, Behind Brigitte Bardot (Warner Bros., 1960)
- 1960: "Ching Ching" Gloria Wood and the Afterbeats, Bob Sherman, Dick Sherman, Buena Vista USA
- 1961: Voices and sings as Nelly the Singing Giraffe in Nelly's Folly, a short cartoon for Warner Bros.
- 1962: Sings for A Symposium on Popular Songs, a short cartoon for Disney: "The Boogie Woogie Bakery Man", "Rock, Rumble and Roar", "Charleston Charlie", Robert B. Sherman, Richard M. Sherman.
- 1964: The Woody Woodpecker Show (Animated Series) Singer "Spook-a-Nanny"
- 1966: The Super 6 cartoon
- 1966: Batman (Live Action Series; theme song chorus)
- 1969: A Boy Named Charlie Brown (Animated Film; singer)
- 1973: Walt Disney presents Christmas Adventure in Disneyland album – Disneyland Records.
- 1978: Yogi's Space Race by Hanna-Barbera
- 1995: Voices various cartoon characters in That's Warner Bros.! TV series; reconfigured as The Bugs n' Daffy Show (TV cartoon series) the following year (archive footage).
