= Ginny Simms =

American actress and singer (1913–1994)

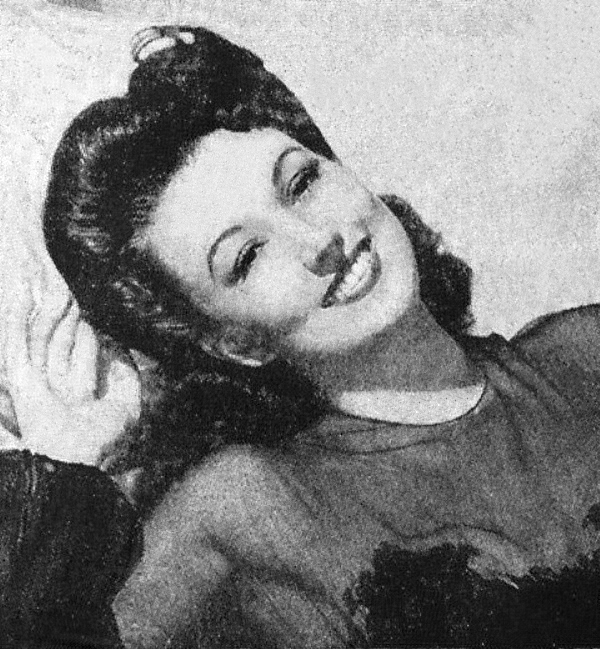
- Simms, c. 1943

Background information
- Also known as: Virginia E. Eastvold
- Born: Virginia Ellen Simms; May 25, 1913; San Antonio, Texas, U.S.
- Died: April 4, 1994 (aged 80) Palm Springs, California, U.S.
- Occupations: Singer, film actress
- Years active: 1932–1951
- Labels: Brunswick; Vocalion; Okeh; Columbia; Sonora
- Formerly of: Kay Kyser Orchestra
- Website: ginnysimms.com

Virginia Ellen Simms (May 25, 1913 (Note: The Social Security Death Index gives her date of birth as May 25, 1914.) – April 4, 1994) was an American popular singer and film actress.

Simms sang with big bands and with Dinah Shore, Peggy Lee, Ella Fitzgerald, and Jo Stafford. She also worked as an MGM and Universal film actress and appeared in 11 movies from 1939 to 1951, when she retired.

== Early life ==
Simms was born in San Antonio, Texas. Her family moved to California, where she attended Fresno High School and Fresno State Teachers College, where she studied piano. While there, she began performing in campus productions, singing with sorority sisters and forming a popular campus vocal trio. She sought a singing career, and by 1932, she had her own program on a local radio station.

== Career ==
=== Radio ===
In 1932, Simms became the vocalist for the Tom Gerun band in San Francisco, working together with other vocalists including a young Tony Martin and Woody Herman. In 1934, she joined the Kay Kyser Orchestra, with which she received her first national exposure appearing on radio shows with Kyser.

=== Films ===
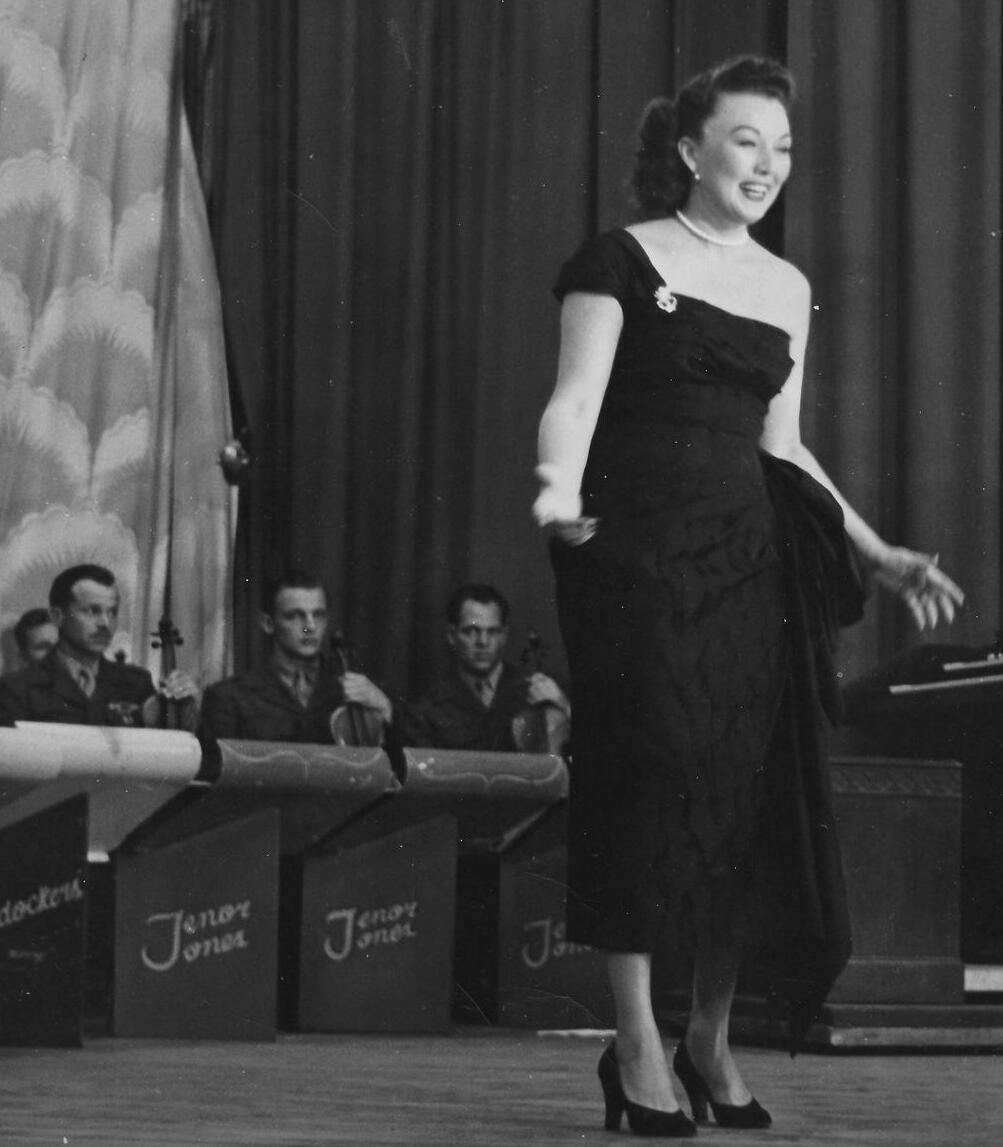
Simms performing in 1951

Simms appeared in three films with Kyser: That's Right—You're Wrong (1939), You'll Find Out (1940), and Playmates (1941).

On April 6, 1941, Simms and Kyser costarred in Niagara to Reno (described as "an original comedy") on radio's Silver Theater. She nearly married Kyser but left his orchestra in September 1941 for her own radio show.

She starred in several more films, including Here We Go Again (1942), Hit the Ice (1943), Broadway Rhythm (1944) and the sanitized Cole Porter biopic Night and Day (1946).

=== Television ===
In 1951, Simms hosted a local television show on KTTV Channel 11 in Los Angeles that featured dance bands and talent from military bases around Southern California.

== Humanitarian work ==
Simms entertained troops during World War II, and after the war, she continued to help servicemen. In 1947, a radio station's newsletter noted: "[N]ow she is helping provide new homes for them. Ginny is sponsoring the construction of 450 homes for vets in Los Angeles."

== Awards ==
On June 5, 1993, a Golden Palm Star on the Walk of Stars was dedicated to Simms.

== Personal life ==
Simms was married three times. Her first marriage (1945–1951) was to Hyatt Hotels founder Hyatt von Dehn, with whom she had two sons: David (born in July 1946) and Conrad (born December 27, 1949). Her second marriage (1951–1953) was to oil man Bob Calhoun, and her third was to Republican former attorney general of Washington state Don Eastvold from June 22, 1962 until her death in 1994.

== Death ==
Simms died after suffering a heart attack in Palm Springs on April 4, 1994 at the age of 80. Her remains are interred at Desert Memorial Park in Cathedral City, California. She was survived by her husband, Donald Eastvold Sr.

== Filmography ==
Year	Title	Role	Notes
1939	That's Right – You're Wrong	herself	
1940	You'll Find Out	herself	
1941	Playmates	herself	
1942	Here We Go Again	Jean Gildersleeve	
1942	Seven Days' Leave	herself	
1943	Hit The Ice	Marcia Manning	
1944	G.I. Journal	herself	short
1944	Broadway Rhythm	Helen Hoyt	
1945	Shady Lady	Leonora Lee Appleby	
1946	Night and Day	Carole Hill	
1951	Disk Jockey	Vickie Peters	

== Selected discography ==
Simms recorded extensively—from June 17, 1935, until July 2, 1947, then again in mid-1953 and finally in December 7 & 9, 1960—for several labels, including: ARA (American Recording Artists), Brunswick, Capitol Custom, Columbia, Conqueror, Okeh, Regal Zonophone, Royale, Sonora, Star-Tone, TOPS, Venise, Vocalion and V-Disc.

Some of these recordings have been rereleased on CD:

- Ginny Simms: Love Is Here to Stay (1997)
- Ginny Simms: V-Disc Recordings CD (1998)
- Gorgeous Ginny Simms (1999)
- Night and Day (1999) (Soundtrack of the 1946 film Night and Day)
- Ginny Simms: I'd Like to Set You to Music (2001)
- Simple & Sweet: The Best of Ginny Simms (2005)
- Ginny Simms: One More Dream (2006)
- All Right With Me! – 30 Years of Cole Porter Magic with the Girls! (2010) – Simms sings two Porter songs: "What Is This Thing Called Love?" and "Easy to Love"
- On the Air With Ginny Simms (2011)
- The Sentimental Stylings of Ginny Simms (2012)
