= Ish Kabibble =

American comedian and cornet player (1908-1994)

- Born: Merwyn Bogue; January 19, 1908; North East, Pennsylvania, U.S.
- Died: June 5, 1994 (aged 86); Palm Springs, California, U.S.
- Occupations: Comedian, cornet player
- Years active: 1931-1959
- Spouse: Janet (Meade) Bogue (1932–1994) (his death) (3 children)
- Children: Merwyn (b. 1937); Pamela (b. 1940); Janet (b. 1941)

Merwyn Bogue (January 19, 1908 – June 5, 1994), known professionally as Ish Kabibble, was an American comedian and cornet player.

== Early life ==
Kabibble was born Merwyn Bogue in North East, Pennsylvania. A few months after his birth, his family moved to Erie, Pennsylvania. He studied law at West Virginia University.

== Career ==
Kabibble appeared in ten movies between 1939 and 1950. In Thousands Cheer (1943), he appeared with Kay Kyser and sang "I Dug a Ditch", and he appeared as a vocalist in That's Right—You're Wrong (1939), You'll Find Out (1940), and Playmates (1941). In addition, he performed with Kyser on the radio and television quiz show Kay Kyser's Kollege of Musical Knowledge in 1949 and 1950.

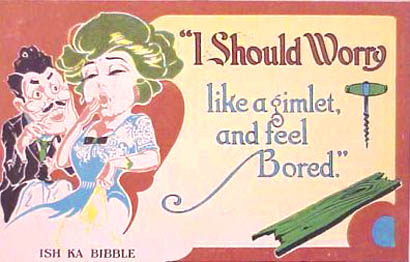
The origin of Merwyn Bogue's stage name, Ish Kabibble, can be traced back to the 1913 novelty song "Isch ga-bibble" and this 1915 cartoon postcard, which displays a spelling (Ish Ka Bibble) similar to that used by Bogue. Between the song and the card, in 1914, Harry Hershfield introduced his character Abie Kabibble in his comic strip Abie the Agent.

In his 1989 autobiography, Kabibble explained his stage name, which he took from the lyrics of one of his comedic songs, "Isch ga-bibble."

The song derived from a mock-Yiddish expression, "Ische ga bibble?", which was purported to mean "I should worry?" While this derivation has been widely quoted on the Internet and elsewhere, the expression "ische ga bibble" is not Yiddish and in fact contains no Yiddish words at all.

Kabibble's stage persona was that of a gangling goof. He was a cornet player and was the business manager for the Kay Kyser Orchestra for most of its existence. Kyser disbanded the orchestra during the summer of 1947 but resurrected it for a television series in October 1949. During the hiatus Spike Jones hired Kabibble to appear in Jones's zany band the City Slickers. Kabibble did not like the experience, and was with the Jones band briefly. Kabibble was one of four members of the Kyser band who returned for the TV show, which ran 14 months. Kyser retired from show business on Christmas Day, 1950, and the band broke up for good.

With the decline of the big bands, Kabibble worked as a solo comedian or in partnership with his old Kyser associate Mike Douglas.

== Personal life ==
Kabibble was known informally as "Mern." He married Janet Meade in 1932, and the couple had three children: Merwyn (known as Peter), born 1937; Pamela, 1940; and Janet, 1941.

In 1961, Kabibble earned a license to work in real estate, and became successful in his new career. "I liked selling real estate," he recalled in his memoir. "In a sense, selling real estate is much the same as being in show business. Instead of talking to a large audience, I talk to a man and his wife. The applause happens when they write the check, and if they do not write the check, it means I did a lousy show." By 1973, Kabibble and his wife were living in Hawaii. Kabibble caused double-takes from prospective clients who saw his trademark haircut and read his business card: "Ish Kabibble, Sales Manager."

Kabibble died in 1994 in Joshua Tree, California, of respiratory failure brought on by pulmonary disease and emphysema.

== Cultural legacy ==
The academic society known as The International Society for the History, Philosophy, and Social Studies of Biology goes by the acronym ISHPSSB, but the abbreviation is commonly pronounced "ishkabibble" at the suggestion of David Hull, as an homage to Kabibble.

A pair of eateries selling cheesesteaks and other sandwiches on South Street in Philadelphia is named Ishkabibble's. Their featured beverage is the Gremlin, a half-grape juice, half-lemonade concoction.

The character of Maude, played by Beatrice Arthur, mentioned on the December 11, 1971 episode of "All In The Family" that Archie Bunker enjoyed the antics of Ish Kabibble, a reference to Archie's low-brow character.
