= Harry Babbitt =

American singer (1913–2004)

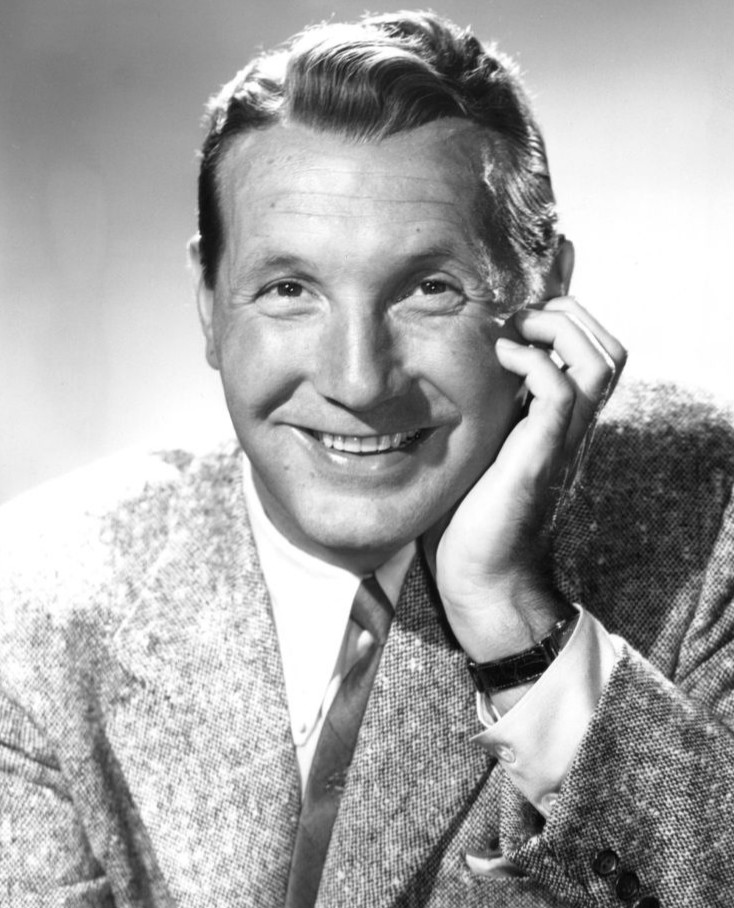
- Harry Babbitt (1953)
- Born: November 2, 1913; St. Louis, Missouri, U.S.
- Died: April 9, 2004 (aged 90); Aliso Viejo, California, U.S.
- Occupation: Singer
- Known for: Singing with Kay Kyser's Orchestra
- Spouse: Betty
- Children: 3 sons

Harry Babbitt (November 2, 1913 – April 9, 2004) was an American singer and star during the Big Band era.

== Early career ==
Born in St. Louis, Missouri, Babbitt organized his own band after high school, directing the group in addition to singing and playing saxophone and drums. Later, his work as an announcer and soloist on a radio station in St. Louis caught the attention of bandleader Kay Kyser.

== Music career ==
Babbitt joined the Kyser band in the winter of 1936. With Kyser he recorded several hits in his rich baritone. On some novelty tunes he adopted a high-pitched falsetto. Babbitt sang such hits as "Three Little Fishies," "On a Slow Boat to China" and "Jingle, Jangle, Jingle," but his biggest hit was the cover of Vera Lynn's "The White Cliffs of Dover". He also sang the Spike Jones holiday hit, "All I Want for Christmas Is My Two Front Teeth" and did the laugh on Kyser's "Woody Woodpecker" song with vocalist Gloria Wood. He appeared as a regular on Kyser's radio program, Kay Kyser's Kollege of Musical Knowledge, and in seven movies with Kyser, including That's Right – You're Wrong (1939), Thousands Cheer (1943) and Carolina Blues (1944).

Babbitt served in the United States Navy from 1944 to 1946, then returned to Kyser's band, which he eventually left for good in 1949.

== Radio and television ==
Babbitt was host of an early morning radio show, The Second Cup of Coffee Club on CBS. It ran 10 years in the 1940s and 1950s. He also co-starred with Mary Small on By Popular Demand, a weekly program on Mutual in 1945–1946.

Babbitt's obituary in Variety called him "a television pioneer," noting that "he hosted two long-running musical shows on KTLA-TV in Los Angeles: Bandstand Review and Hollywood Opportunity. He also hosted an NBC program, Glamour Girl, which ran in 1953–1954 and provided "wardrobe advice, beauty treatments and other tips ... designed to make the average woman a glamour girl."

== Later years ==
Babbitt retired from showbusiness in 1964 and made money in real estate in Orange County, California. He also managed the Newport Tennis Club and headed public relations for a retirement community, both in Orange County.

After Kyser died, Babbitt went on tour with a new band, using Kyser's name and music. He retired from that in the mid-1990s.

== Death ==
Babbitt died at the age of 90 in Aliso Viejo, California. He and his wife, Betty, were married 69 years. He was survived by her, their sons Michael, Stephen and Christopher, six grandchildren and two great-grandchildren.
