= Riders in the Sky "Lassoed Live" at the Schermerhorn with the Nashville Symphony =

Live album by Riders in the Sky
- Released: 2009
- Recorded: February 2009
- Genre: Western
- Label: Riders Radio Records

Riders in the Sky chronology
Riders in the Sky Live from the Golden Age of Riders Radio Theater (2006)	Riders in the Sky "Lassoed Live" at the Schermerhorn with the Nashville Symphony (2009)

Riders in the Sky "Lassoed Live" at the Schermerhorn with the Nashville Symphony is a 2009 live album, the highlights of a 3-night concert series recorded by Riders in the Sky in conjunction with the Nashville Symphony Orchestra.

The album won three awards at the 2010 Western Music Association Awards. The group, however, was not in attendance as they were performing their 6,024th career appearance in Cody, Wyoming, that evening.

In reaction to receiving the award, Douglas B. Green, vocalist, stated “We are stunned and deeply honored to be so recognized by our peers.” Group comedian and bass-player Fred LaBour added, “When we heard we’d won three WMA awards, we threw our huge hats in the air, yodeled in perfect outdoor harmony, enjoyed a celebratory plate of biscuits and beans, and hit the trail for another show. The WMA folks are with us in the trenches of presenting, promoting, and preserving cowboy music, and we’re so pleased they recognize what we do.”

== Personnel ==
=== Riders in the Sky ===
- Douglas B. Green (a.k.a. Ranger Doug) – vocals, guitar
- Paul Chrisman (a.k.a. Woody Paul) – vocals, fiddle
- Fred LaBour (a.k.a. Too Slim) – vocals, bass
- Joey Miskulin (a.k.a. Joey The Cowpolka King) – vocals, accordion

=== Nashville Symphony orchestra ===
Kelly Corcoran, Assistant Conductor

== Awards ==
- Western Music Association - 2010 - Best Collaborative/ Composite Album
- Western Music Association - 2010 Outstanding Entertainer-Group of the Year
- Western Music Association - 2010 Album of the Year

== Track listing ==
1. "Riders in the Sky Overture"
2. "Ride Cowboy Ride"
3. "Cool Water"
4. "Yellow Rose of Texas"
5. "The Arms of My Love"
6. "South of the Border"
7. "Woody's Roundup Medley"
8. "Back in the Saddle Again"
9. "Rawhide"
10. "Lonely Yukon Stars"
11. "(Ghost) Riders in the Sky"
12. "Happy Trails"
13. "Tumbling Tumbleweeds"
