= Harmony Ranch =

Studio album by Riders in the Sky
- Released: 1991
- Studio: Nightingale Studio, Nashville, Tennessee; The Doghouse, Nashville, Tennessee
- Genre: Western / Children
- Length: 30:37
- Label: CBS
- Producer: Steve Buckingham, Steve Gibson

Riders in the Sky chronology
Horse Opera (1990)	Harmony Ranch (1991)	Merry Christmas from Harmony Ranch (1992)

Professional ratings
Review scores
Source	Rating
Allmusic	link

Harmony Ranch is a studio recording released by the Western band Riders in the Sky in 1991. It is a tie-in album to the Riders' 1991 CBS children's show.

== Track listing ==
1. "Harmony Ranch" – 2:25
2. "How Does He Yodel?" (Douglas Green) – 2:34
3. "Great Grand Dad" (Public Domain) – 2:28
4. "The Big Corral" (Public Domain) – 1:50
5. "Pecos Bill" (Eliot Daniel, John Lange, Bob Nolan, Paul Smith, Tim Spencer) – 2:41
6. "I Always Do" (Green) – 3:13
7. "One Little Coyote" (Green) – 4:54
8. "Come and Get It" – 1:58
9. "The Cowboy's ABCs" (Green) – 2:30
10. "Face: The Music" – 2:11
11. "(Cody of the) Pony Express" (Bob Nolan) – 2:03
12. "Prairie Lullabye" – 1:50

== Personnel ==
- Douglas B. Green (a.k.a. Ranger Doug) – vocals, guitar
- Paul Chrisman (a.k.a. Woody Paul) – vocals, fiddle
- Fred LaBour (a.k.a. Too Slim) – vocals, string bass
- Joey Miskulin – accordion
- Paul Franklin – pedal steel guitar
- Kenny Malone – drums, percussion
- Kristin Wilkinson; Viola, String Arrangements;
- Mark Casstevens – guitar, Jew's-harp, harmonica, banjo
- Steve Gibson – guitar, dobro, mandolin
- David Angell – violin
- David Davidson – violin
- Dennis Wilson – vocal arrangement
- Grace Bahing – cello

Production notes

- Rich Schirmer – engineer
- Marshall Morgan – engineer, mixing
- Bill Johnson – art direction
- Brad Jones – engineer
- Carlos Grier – editing
- Carol Elliott – production coordination
- Chrissey Follman – assistant engineer
- Denny Purcell – mastering
- Gary Paczosa – engineer
