= Cowboy Songs (Riders in the Sky album) =

Compilation album by Riders in the Sky
- Released: 20 August 1996
- Genre: Western
- Length: 34:29
- Label: Easydisc
- Producer: Russ Miller, Joey Miskulin

Riders in the Sky chronology
Always Drink Upstream from the Herd (1995)	Cowboy Songs (1996)	Public Cowboy #1: The Music of Gene Autry (1996)

Cowboy Songs is a compilation recording released by the Western band Riders in the Sky in 1996. It is available as a single CD.

This album is a collection of 12 of the most widely known and popular songs of the west—performed in the tradition of the bands Sons of the Pioneers and the Riders of the Purple Sage.

== Track listing ==
1. "(I've Got Spurs That) Jingle Jangle Jingle" (Frank Loesser, J.J. Lilley) – 2:35
2. "Tumbling Tumbleweeds" (Bob Nolan) – 3:30
3. "Don't Fence Me In" (Cole Porter, Robert Fletcher) – 2:35
4. "The Cattle Call" (Tex Owens) – 2:48
5. "(Ghost) Riders in the Sky" (Stan Jones) – 3:05
6. "The Streets of Laredo (The Cowboy's Lament)" (Traditional) – 3:07
7. "I Ride an Old Paint" (Traditional) – 2:15
8. "Red River Valley" (Traditional) – 4:03
9. "Rawhide" (Dimitri Tiomkin, Ned Washington) – 2:07
10. "Chasin' the Sun" (Douglas B. Green) – 2:01
11. "Back in the Saddle Again" (Gene Autry, Ray Whitley) – 2:14
12. "Home on the Range" (Traditional) – 4:09

== Personnel ==
- Douglas B. Green (a.k.a. Ranger Doug) – vocals, guitar
- Paul Chrisman (a.k.a. Woody Paul) – vocals, fiddle
- Fred LaBour (a.k.a. Too Slim) – vocals, bass
- Eddie Bayers – percussion
- Kenny Malone – percussion
- Kayton Roberts – pedal steel guitar
- Gregg Galbraith – guitar
- Tommy Goldsmith – guitar
- Mark Howard – guitar
- Rich O'Brien – guitar
- Paul Worley – guitar
- Tommy Wells – drums
- Carl Gorodetzky – violin
- Lee Larrison – violin
- Pamela Sixfin – violin
- Andrea Zonn – violin, viola
