= Riders Radio Theater =

- Genre: Comedy, Western, Music, Variety
- Running time: 28 Minutes
- Country of origin: United States
- Language: English
- Home station: WPLN-FM (Nashville episodes) and WVXU-FM (Cincinnati episodes)
- Starring: Riders in the Sky (band)
- Created by: Riders in the Sky & Thomas Goldsmith
- Narrated by: Steve Arwood
- Recording studio: Tennessee Performing Arts Center (1988-1989); Emery Theater (1990-1995)
- Opening theme: Riders Radio Theme
- Ending theme: So Long, Saddle Pals

Riders Radio Theater was an ongoing radio show performed live by the Western band Riders in the Sky. The series was initially recorded in at the Johnson Theater at the Tennessee Performing Arts Center in Nashville, with WPLN-FM as the presenting station, but moved to Cincinnati, Ohio. These half-hour radio shows can be heard on Tuesdays at 11am (EST) on WMKV 89.3 FM, out of the Cincinnati, Ohio area and on Wednesday Nights at 7:00 PM (CST) on KPMI 1300 AM, out of the Bemidji, Minnesota area. It has recently been picked up by Bluegrass Country Radio on Tuesdays midnight to 1:00am and Fridays 9 until 10:00pm. page It can also be heard on the official Riders In The Sky iTunes page and SoundCloud for free at any time.

== History ==
=== Live At The Wind And The Willows (1979) ===
Early in their career in the late 1970s, Riders In The Sky (then consisting of Ranger Doug, Too Slim, Tumbleweed Tommy Goldsmith, and Woody Paul) would regularly perform live at The Wind And The Willows club in Nashville on Tuesday nights. Deciding to make the performances more interactive and parody and pay homage to 1930's era Western singing cowboy serials, Tommy Goldsmith wrote a story called The Cowboy Who Hated Christmas to be performed live in front of the audience at The Wind And The Willows. This would become the first "episode" of Riders Radio Theater, except these performances were never taped. Some other Riders Radio stories performed at the club were "The Riders Join OPEC", "The Riders Go Hawaiian", "The Riders Go To Sweden", and "The Triple X Chainsaw Massacre". Goldsmith would later say that he was inspired to write The Cowboy Who Hated Christmas by a radio program called Radio Mystery Theater that he would listen to while on the road touring as a musician.

=== The Album (1988) ===
In 1988, the Riders, now a trio, would record the album titled Riders Radio Theater for their second MCA record. This hour-long album would essentially become a prototype episode of the actual half-hour radio series.

=== The National Public Radio Series (1988-1995) ===
The early half-hour shows included (in order): an opening song by the Riders, a fake commercial, another song, a chapter in the "Ongoing Saga of the Cowboy Way", another song, and then close with "So Long, Saddle Pals". In later episodes, guest stars (The Nashville Jugband being the first) would perform where the second song was and then later in the middle of the "Ongoing Saga of The Cowboy Way" chapter. Also some later episodes would run out of time, completely omitting the closing performance of "So Long, Saddle Pals".

The first two episodes were taped on April 25, 1988. The first 52 episodes (from 1988 to 1989) were taped in Nashville, then from January 22, 1990 to August 18, 1995, the show was taped at the Emery Theater in Cincinnati, Ohio.

=== The Nashville Network Television Specials (1995-1996) ===
Several Riders Radio Theater television specials were commissioned by the Riders' then manager David Skepner for The Nashville Network shortly after the radio series had ended, the first special featuring Barbara Mandrell.

=== Silver Jubilee Medley (2003) ===
On the Riders' 2003 album, Silver Jubilee, a new, six-minute mini-episode of Riders Radio Theater was recorded for the Riders' 25th Anniversary.

=== Live From The Golden Age of Riders Radio Theater Album (2006) ===
In 2006, the Riders released a "best of" collection of songs from the first couple of serials called Live From The Golden Age of Riders Radio Theater.

==== Riders Radio Records Label ====
The Live From The Golden Age of Riders Radio Theater album was released by the Riders Radio Records label, named after the radio series. So far, only three other Riders albums have been released by this label: Land Beyond The Sun (2011), Home On The Range (2013), and Riders In The Sky Salute Roy Rogers: King of The Cowboys (2016).

== Cast & Crew ==
=== Riders In The Sky ===
- "Ranger Doug" Green - Musical Performer/Actor (Notable roles include Charlie, Dr. B. Baxter Basil, and Sergeant Dudley)
- Fred "Too Slim" LaBour - Musical Performer/Writer/Actor (Notable roles include Sidemeat, Too Jaws, Slocum, and L. Philo "Larry" Mammoth)
- "Woody Paul" Chrisman - Musical Performer/Actor (Notable roles include Drywall Paul, and Mrs. Dr. B. Baxter Basil)
- Joey "The Cow-Polka King" Miskulin - Musical Performer/Actor

=== Other Cast Members ===
- Steve "Texas Bix Bender" Arwood - Writer/Announcer
- Bruce "Zeno Clinker" Nemerov - Sound Effects Wrangler

=== Crew ===
- Roberta Samet - Stage Manager
- David Skepner - Director
- Lisa Harris - Assistant to David Skepner
- Brenda Loftis - Producer
- Judy Liff - Producer
