= Horse Opera (album) =

Studio album by Riders in the Sky
- Released: 1990
- Recorded: April 10–11, 1990
- Studio: 16th Avenue Recorders; Nashville, TN
- Genre: Western
- Length: 36:02
- Label: MCA
- Producer: Buzz Stone

Riders in the Sky chronology
Best of the West Rides Again (1990)	Horse Opera (1990)	Harmony Ranch (1991)

Professional ratings
Review scores
Source	Rating
Allmusic	link

Horse Opera was the 13th album of the Western swing trio Riders in the Sky, released in 1990 by MCA Records.

== Track listing ==
1. "Ride Cowboy Ride" – 2:07
2. "Maybe I'll Cry Over You" – 3:03
3. "Texas Echo" – 2:50
4. "Slocum Intro" – 0:50
5. "What Would I do Without You" – 2:47
6. "The Arms of My Love" – 2:17
7. "Homecoming Yodel" – 2:40
8. "Call of the Canyon" – 2:38
9. "Drywall Intro" – 0:32
10. "Livin' in a Mobile Home" – 2:50
11. "The Line Rider" – 3:30
12. "Sidekick Heaven" – 6:55
13. "Somebody's Got to Do It" – 3:03

== Personnel ==
=== Riders in the Sky ===
- Douglas B. Green (a.k.a. Ranger Doug) – guitar, vocals
- Paul Chrisman (a.k.a. Woody Paul) – fiddle, guitar, banjo, vocals
- Fred LaBour (a.k.a. Too Slim) – bass, vocals

=== Additional musicians ===
- Joey Miskulin (a.k.a. Joey The Cowpolka King) – accordion
- Kenny Malone – percussion
- John Wills – guitar
