= A Great Big Western Howdy! =

Studio album by Riders in the Sky
- Released: July 14, 1998
- Genre: Western
- Length: 40:52
- Label: Rounder
- Producer: Joey Miskulin

Riders in the Sky chronology
Yodel the Cowboy Way (1998)	A Great Big Western Howdy! (1998)	Christmas the Cowboy Way (1999)

Professional ratings
Review scores
Source	Rating
Allmusic	link

A Great Big Western Howdy! is a studio recording released by the Western band Riders in the Sky in 1998. It is available as a single CD.

== Track listing ==
1. "Wah-Hoo!"
2. "A Hundred and Sixty Acres"
3. "Cherokee"
4. "Autumn on the Trail"
5. "The Ballad of Palindrome/Palindrome: The Scene With Johnny Western"
6. "Cowboy Camp Meetin'"
7. "The Arms of My Love"
8. "Cimarron Moon"
9. "The Sidekick Jig"
10. "A Border Romance"
11. "One More Ride With Marty Stuart"
12. "He Walks with the Wild and the Lonely"

== Personnel ==
- Douglas B. Green (a.k.a. Ranger Doug) – vocals, guitar
- Paul Chrisman (a.k.a. Woody Paul) – vocals, fiddle
- Fred LaBour (a.k.a. Too Slim) – vocals, bass
- Joey Miskulin (a.k.a. the Cowpolka King) – accordion, vocals
- Mark Casstevens – guitar
- Richard O'Brien – guitar
- Bob Mater – drums, percussion
- George Tidwell – trumpet
- Brent Truitt – mandolin, Danelectro guitar
- Mark Howard – guitar
- Kris Wilkinson – violin, viola
- David Davidson – violin
- Reilly McFeeney – Irish folk flute
