= Ridin' the Tweetsie Railroad =

Studio album by Riders in the Sky
- Released: 2002
- Genre: Western

Riders in the Sky chronology
| A Pair of Kings (2002) | Ridin' the Tweetsie Railroad (2002) | Monsters, Inc. Scream Factory Favorites (2002) |

Ridin' the Tweetsie Railroad is a studio recording released by the Western band Riders in the Sky in 2002. Created with the cooperation of the Tweetsie Railroad theme park in Blowing Rock, North Carolina the album is a mixture of standard train songs (such as "I've Been Working On The Railroad" and "Casey Jones", and new compositions by the band exclusive to this album, including "Tweetsie Railroad Line", "Ghost Train" and "Tweetsie Junction".

== Track listing ==
1. Tweetsie Railroad Line (Douglas B. Green)
2. New River Train (Carson Robison)
3. Casey Jones (traditional, arr. Riders In The Sky)
4. Great Northern (Douglas B. Green)
5. Rock Island Line (traditional, arr. Riders In The Sky)
6. I've Been Working on the Railroad (traditional, arr. Riders In The Sky)
7. Here Comes the Santa Fe (Douglas B. Green)
8. Railroad Corral (traditional, arr. Riders In The Sky)
9. Tweetsie Junction (Joey Miskulin)
10. Orange Blossom Special (Ervin T. Rouse)
11. Ghost Train (Fred LaBour)
12. Way Out There (Bob Nolan)
13. Wabash Cannonball (traditional, arr. Riders In The Sky)

== Personnel ==
Riders in the Sky

- Douglas B. Green (a.k.a. Ranger Doug) – vocals, guitar
- Paul Chrisman (a.k.a. Woody Paul) – vocals, fiddle
- Fred LaBour (a.k.a. Too Slim) – vocals, bass, liner notes
- Joey Miskulin (a.k.a. Joey The Cowpolka King) – vocals, accordion

Additional Musicians

- Richard O'Brien, guitar
- John Gardner, percussion
