= Riders in the Sky Present: Davy Crockett, King of the Wild Frontier =

Studio album by Riders in the Sky
- Released: August 3, 2004
- Genre: Western
- Label: Rounder
- Producer: Joey Miskulin

Riders in the Sky chronology
Silver Jubilee (2003)	Riders in the Sky Present: Davy Crockett, King of the Wild Frontier (2004)	Live from the Golden Age of Riders Radio Theater (2006)

Professional ratings
Review scores
Source	Rating
Allmusic	3.5/5 stars

Riders In The Sky Present: Davy Crockett, King Of The Wild Frontier is a studio recording released by the Western band Riders in the Sky on August 3, 2004. It is available as a single CD.

Riders In The Sky offers a tribute to Davy Crockett, the scout, militiaman, Congressman, and hero of the Alamo whose life became an American legend. This album is a combination of folk songs, neo-folk songs, Disney themes, and their own tunes to paint a picture of Davy Crockett that's neither totally real nor totally false, but filled with the vivid stories of the frontiersman who is part of the collective American imagination.

== Track listing ==
1. "The Ballad of Davy Crockett" (Blackburn, Bruns) – 6:46
2. "Be Sure You're Right, And Then Go Ahead" (Ebsen, Parker) – 2:30
3. "King of the River" (Blackburn, Bruns) – 2:11
4. "Heading for Texas" – 2:41
5. "Old Betsy" (Bruns, George) – 2:04
6. "The Grinning Tale" (Driftwood) – 2:40
7. "Colonel Crockett's Speech to Congress – 2:54
8. "Remember the Alamo" (Bowers) – 3:37
9. "Farewell" (Bruns) – 4:33

== Personnel ==
- Douglas B. Green (a.k.a. Ranger Doug) – vocals, guitar
- Paul Chrisman (a.k.a. Woody Paul) – vocals, fiddle
- Fred LaBour (a.k.a. Too Slim) – vocals, bass
- Joey Miskulin (a.k.a. Joey The Cowpolka King) – vocals, accordion
