= Christmas the Cowboy Way =

Studio album by Riders in the Sky
- Released: October 5, 1999
- Genre: Western
- Length: 41:06
- Label: Rounder
- Producer: Joey Miskulin

Riders in the Sky chronology
| Great Big Western Howdy! (1998) | Christmas the Cowboy Way (1999) | Woody's Roundup: A Rootin' Tootin' Collection of Woody's Favorite Songs (2000) |

Professional ratings
Review scores
| Source | Rating |
|---|---|
| Allmusic | 3/5 stars |

Christmas the Cowboy Way is a studio recording released by the Western band Riders in the Sky on October 5, 1999. It is available as a single CD.

This is a collection new and old Christmas songs by Riders in the Sky.

== Track listing ==
1. Corn, Water and Wood
2. Let It Snow/The Last Christmas Medley You'll Ever Need to Hear
3. The Christmas Yodel
4. Sidemeat's Christmas Stew
5. The Prairie Dog Christmas Ball
6. The Friendly Beasts
7. Virgin Maria
8. I'll Be Home for Christmas
9. An Old Fashioned Christmas Polka
10. The Twelve Days of Cowboy Christmas
11. Just Put a Ribbon in Your Hair
12. O Come, O Come, Emmanuel

== Personnel ==
- Douglas B. Green (a.k.a. Ranger Doug) – vocals, guitar
- Paul Chrisman (a.k.a. Woody Paul) – vocals, fiddle
- Fred LaBour (a.k.a. Too Slim) – vocals, bass
- Joey Miskulin (a.k.a. Joey The Cowpolka King) – vocals, accordion

=== Additional personnel ===
- Richard O'Brien, guitar
- David Hungate, guitar
- Bob Mater, drums, percussion
- Jonathan Yudkin, violin
- Jay Patten, tenor saxophone
- Bob Warren, percussion
