= Best of the West (album) =

Greatest hits album by Riders in the Sky
- Released: January 1987
- Genre: Western swing
- Length: 61:21
- Label: Rounder

Riders in the Sky chronology
New Trails (1986)	Best of the West (1987)	The Cowboy Way (1987)

Professional ratings
Review scores
Source	Rating
Allmusic	link

Best of the West is a compilation recording by the Western band Riders in the Sky, released in 1987. It is available as a single CD and contains highlights from their first five albums on the Rounder label.

By this point in their career, Riders in the Sky have become recognized as Western music authorities. They were at the forefront of sparking a revival of interest in Western music in the style of the Sons of the Pioneers. This album presents classic cowboy songs and new originals.

== Track listing ==
1. "Cowboy Jubilee" (Chrisman, LaBour) – 1:44
2. "That's How the Yodel Was Born" (Douglas Green) – 2:19
3. "(Ghost) Riders in the Sky" (Stan Jones) – 3:19
4. "Don't Fence Me In" (Bob Fletcher, Cole Porter) – 2:38
5. "Ol' Cowpoke" (McMahan) – 3:00
6. "Wasteland" (Green) – 3:30
7. "Blue Bonnet Lady" (Chrisman) – 2:54
8. "Blue Montana Skies" (Green) – 3:29
9. "After You've Gone" (Creamer, Layton) – 2:42
10. "Here Comes the Santa Fe" (Green) – 3:12
11. "Tumbling Tumbleweeds" (Bob Nolan) – 3:33
12. "La Cucaracha" (Traditional) – 1:52
13. "Soon as the Roundup's Through" (Chrisman) – 3:54
14. "I Ride an Old Paint" (Traditional) – 2:14
15. "Riding Alone" (Green) – 3:06
16. "Hold That Critter Down" (Nolan) – 2:04
17. "Ride with the Wind" (Green) – 3:04
18. "Cowboy Song" (Chrisman) – 3:06
19. "Prairie Serenade" (Green) – 2:44
20. "Nevada" (Chrisman, Ritter) – 2:41
21. "Home on the Range" (Traditional) – 4:12
22. "So Long Saddle Pals" (Chrisman) – 1:23

== Personnel ==
- Douglas B. Green (a.k.a. Ranger Doug) – guitar, vocals
- Paul Chrisman (a.k.a. Woody Paul) – fiddle, vocals
- Fred LaBour (a.k.a. Too Slim) – bass, vocals
