= Woody's Roundup: A Rootin' Tootin' Collection of Woody's Favorite Songs =

Studio album by Riders in the Sky
- Released: August 29, 2000
- Genre: Children's; Western
- Length: 29 minutes
- Label: Walt Disney
- Producer: Joey Miskulin

Riders in the Sky chronology
| Christmas the Cowboy Way (1999) | Woody's Roundup: A Rootin' Tootin' Collection of Woody's Favorite Songs (2000) | A Pair of Kings (2002) |

Professional ratings
Review scores
| Source | Rating |
|---|---|
| Allmusic | link |

Woody's Roundup: A Rootin' Tootin' Collection of Woody's Favorite Songs (or simply Woody's Roundup) is a studio recording released by the Western band Riders in the Sky on August 29, 2000 on compact disc.

This album is a collection of favorite Western tunes inspired by the fictional Woody's Roundup TV show featured in the film Toy Story 2, including a number of original Riders compositions, songs by longtime Toy Story composer Randy Newman, and cover songs.

The album won the Grammy Award for Best Musical Album for Children at the Grammy Awards of 2001. The song "Woody's Roundup" was used by NASA to wake up the crew of STS-133.

== Track listing ==
| No. | Title | Length |
|---|---|---|
| 1. | "Woody's Roundup" (Newman) | 1:56 |
| 2. | "Act Naturally" (Morrison/Russell) | 2:25 |
| 3. | "Jessie, the Yodelin' Cowgirl" (Green) | 3:09 |
| 4. | "The Ballad of Bullseye" (LaBour) | 2:32 |
| 5. | "You've Got a Friend in Me" (Newman) | 2:06 |
| 6. | "Hey Howdy Hey" (Kostroff/Healey) | 2:05 |
| 7. | "My Favorite Toys" (LaBour) | 1:55 |
| 8. | "How Does She Yodel?" (Green) | 2:26 |
| 9. | "The Prospector Polka" (Miskulin) | 2:12 |
| 10. | "You've Got a Friend in Me (instrumental)" (Newman) | 2:04 |
| 11. | ""One, Two, Three," Said the Prospector" (Green) | 2:23 |
| 12. | "Home on the Range" (Higley/Traditional) | 2:29 |
| 13. | "Shh! A Secret Bonus Track! (To Infinity and Beyond)" (LaBour) | 1:59 |

== Personnel ==
- Douglas B. Green (a.k.a. Ranger Doug) – guitar, vocals
- Fred LaBour (a.k.a. Too Slim) – Bunkhouse Bass, guitar, vocals, sound effects
- Paul Chrisman (a.k.a. Woody Paul) – fiddle, vocals
- Joey Miskulin (a.k.a. Joey The Cowpolka King) – accordion, vocals, keyboard, percussion, sound effects
- Devon Dawson – vocals on "Jessie, the Yodelin' Cowgirl" and "How Does She Yodel?"
- Other instruments: Richard O'Brien (guitars), Jonathan Yudkin (fiddle), and Bob Mater (drums/percussion)
- Six children singers on "Hey Howdy Hey"
