= Cowboys in Love =

Studio album by Riders in the Sky
- Released: 1994
- Genre: Western swing
- Length: 32:04
- Label: Epic
- Producer: Joey Miskulin

Riders in the Sky chronology
Saturday Morning with Riders (1994)	Cowboys in Love (1994)	Always Drink Upstream from the Herd (1995)

Professional ratings
Review scores
Source	Rating
Allmusic	4.5/5 stars

Cowboys in Love is a studio recording released by the Western band Riders in the Sky, released in 1994. It was their only release on the Epic label.

Special guest Emmylou Harris duets with Ranger Doug on "One Has My Name (The Other Has My Heart)" and Asleep at the Wheel on "I'm a Ding Dong Daddy".

== Track listing ==
1. "The Cowboy's in Love" (Douglas Green) – 2:48
2. "Along the Santa Fe Trail" (Edwina Coolidge, Al Dubin, Wilhelm Grosz) – 3:12
3. "One Has My Name (The Other Has My Heart)" (Hal Blair, Eddie Dean, Lorene Dean) – 2:44
4. "Wimmen...Who Needs 'Em" (Green) – 2:38
5. "Sweet Señorita Teresa" (Paul) – 2:34
6. "Farr Away Stomp (A Tribute to Our Four Legged Friends)" (Karl Farr, Hugh Farr) – 2:18
7. "The Yellow Rose of Texas" – 3:01
8. "La Malagueña" – 2:58
9. "I'm a Ding Dong Daddy" (Green) – 3:20
10. "Early Autumn" (Green) – 3:29
11. "You're Wearin' Out Your Welcome, Matt" (David Kent, Joey Scott) – 3:02

== Personnel ==
- Douglas B. Green (a.k.a. Ranger Doug) – vocals, guitar
- Paul Chrisman (a.k.a. Woody Paul) – vocals, fiddle
- Fred LaBour (a.k.a. Too Slim) – vocals, bass
- Emmylou Harris – harmony vocals
- Gregg Galbraith – acoustic guitar, steel guitar
- Tommy Wells – drums
- Mark Howard – electric and acoustic guitar, mandolin
- Joey Miskulin – organ, accordion
- Dennis Burnside – string arrangements
- Barbara Lamb – violin
- Kenny Malone – percussion

== Production notes ==
- Produced by Joey Miskulin
- Engineered by Gary Paczosa and Ed Simonton
- Mastered by Denny Purcell
- Editing by Don Cobb
- Art Direction by Bill Johnson
- Design by Jodi Lynn Miller
- Photography by Frank Ockenfels
