= Prairie Serenade =

Studio album by Riders in the Sky
- Released: 1982
- Studio: Quadrafonic Sound (Nashville, Tennessee)
- Genre: Western
- Length: 44:56
- Label: Rounder
- Producer: Riders in the Sky

Riders in the Sky chronology
Cowboy Jubilee (1982)	Prairie Serenade (1982)	Weeds & Water (1983)

Professional ratings
Review scores
Source	Rating
Allmusic	link

Prairie Serenade is the third studio album by the Western band Riders in the Sky, released in 1982. It is available as a single CD.

== Track listing ==
1. "Prairie Serenade" (Douglas B. Green) – 2:43
2. "(I've Got Spurs That) Jingle Jangle Jingle" (Joseph J. Lilley, Frank Loesser) – 2:40
3. "Blue Shadows on the Trail" (Eliot Daniel, Johnny Lange) – 3:43
4. "Pretty Prairie Princess" (Paul Chrisman) – 2:25
5. "Cowpoke" (Stan Jones) – 1:42
6. "Nevada" (Chrisman, Karen Ritter) – 2:40
7. "Down the Trail to San Antone" (Deuce Spriggins) – 1:57
8. "I Ride an Old Paint" (Traditional) – 2:14
9. "Utah Trail" (Chrisman) – 3:29
10. "Old El Paso" (Green) – 2:16
11. "Chasin' the Sun" (Green) – 2:04
12. "Home on the Range" (Traditional) – 4:11

== Personnel ==
- Douglas B. Green (a.k.a. Ranger Doug) – guitar, vocals
- Paul Chrisman (a.k.a. Woody Paul) – fiddle, guitar, mandolin, harmonica, accordion, vocals
- Fred LaBour (a.k.a. Too Slim) – bass, guitar, vocals
- Kayton Robers – steel guitar
- Kenny Malone – percussion

== Production notes ==
- Todd Cerney – engineer
- Denny Purcell – mastering
