= Riders in the Sky Live from the Golden Age of Riders Radio Theater =

Live from the Golden Age of Riders Radio Theater

Live album by Riders in the Sky
- Released: 2006
- Genre: Western
- Label: Riders Radio Records

Riders in the Sky chronology
Davy Crockett, King of the Wild Frontier (2004)	Live from the Golden Age of Riders Radio Theater (2006)	Riders in the Sky "Lassoed Live" at the Schermerhorn with the Nashville Symphony (2009)

Live from the Golden Age of Riders Radio Theater is a compilation album by the Western band Riders in the Sky in 2006. The album is a collection of songs featured on the Riders' weekly radio show: Riders Radio Theater. It is available as a single CD.

== Track listing ==
1. "Back in the Saddle Again"
2. "Wah-Hoo"
3. "Along the Navajo Trail"
4. "Bye Bye Blackbird"
5. "A Cowboy Has to Sing"
6. "The Wayward Wind"
7. "Singin' a Song of The Sage"
8. "I Still Do"
9. "That's How the Yodel Was Born"
10. "Empty Saddles in the Old Corral"
11. "Lonely Yukon Stars"
12. "Riding the Old Front Range"
13. "Beyond the Reef"
14. "Wild Fiddler's Rag"
15. "Little Joe, The Wrangler"
16. "Chant of the Plains"
17. "Chime Bells"
18. "The Last Waltz"
19. "Song of the Bandit"
20. "This Ain't the Same Old Range"

== Personnel ==
- Douglas B. Green (a.k.a. Ranger Doug) – vocals, guitar
- Paul Chrisman (a.k.a. Woody Paul) – vocals, fiddle
- Fred LaBour (a.k.a. Too Slim) – vocals, bass
- Joey Miskulin (a.k.a. Joey The Cowpolka King) – vocals, accordion
