= Monsters, Inc. Scream Factory Favorites =

Compilation album by Riders in the Sky
- Released: August 27, 2002
- Genre: Children's; Western
- Length: 33:30
- Label: Walt Disney

Riders in the Sky chronology
Ridin' the Tweetsie Railroad (2002)	Monsters, Inc. Scream Factory Favorites (2002)	Silver Jubilee (2003)

Monsters, Inc. Scream Factory Favorites is a studio recording released by the Western band Riders in the Sky on August 27, 2002 on a single CD. The album is produced by Joey Miskulin. It features covers of the songs from the Disney/Pixar film Monsters, Inc., as well as original material. The album won the Grammy Award for Best Musical Album for Children at the Grammy Awards of 2003, making it the second such award for the band itself.

The album was originally packaged with "Lyrics Included" so one can sing along to the songs.

== Track listing ==
- All tracks performed by Riders in the Sky except for "Lullaby for Boo" performed with Sonya Isaacs.
1. "If I Didn't Have You" (Randy Newman)
2. "Do Wah Diddy Diddy" (Mike's Song) (J. Barry & E. Greenwich)
3. "I Only Have Eye for You" (Douglas B. Green)
4. "Monsters, Inc." March (Fred LaBour)
5. "Monster ABCs" (Fred LaBour)
6. "Lullaby for Boo" (with Sonya Isaacs) (Paul Chrisman and Fred LaBour)
7. "If I Didn't Have You" [instrumental] (Randy Newman)
8. "It's Our Job" (Joey Miskulin)
9. "Paperwork" (Roz's Song) (Douglas B. Green)
10. "Monsters' Jubilee" (Paul Chrisman & Douglas B. Green)
11. "Under the Bed" (Douglas B. Green)
12. "The Perfect Roar" (Sulley's Song) (Paul Chrisman & Joshua Archibald-Seiffer)
13. "Big High Wire Hop" [instrumental] (Background music for Pixar short For the Birds, released theatrically with Monsters, Inc.)

== Personnel ==
- Douglas B. Green (a.k.a. Ranger Doug)
- Paul Crisman (a.k.a. Woody Paul)
- Fred LaBour (a.k.a. Too Slim)
- Joey Miskulin (a.k.a. Joey The Cowpolka King)
- Guest Piano: Josh Archibald master of keys

== Production ==
The album was recorded by Joey Miskulin at the Musicwagon Studio in Nashville, Tennessee and by Brent Truitt at B. Truitt Music in Nashville, with additional recording by Tim Roberts. The album was mixed by Dan Rudin at the Musicwagon Studio, and mastered by Denny Purcell at Georgetown Masters in Nashville.
