= Yodel the Cowboy Way =

Compilation album by Riders in the Sky
- Released: January 13, 1998
- Genre: Western
- Length: 32:24
- Label: Easydisc
- Producer: Joey Miskulin, Riders in the Sky

Riders in the Sky chronology
Public Cowboy #1: The Music of Gene Autry (1996)	Yodel the Cowboy Way (1998)	Great Big Western Howdy! (1998)

Professional ratings
Review scores
Source	Rating
Allmusic	3/5 stars

Yodel the Cowboy Way is a compilation recording released by the Western band Riders in the Sky on January 13, 1998. It is available as a single CD.

For years, the fans of Riders in the Sky had requested a collection showcasing the group's yodeling talents. It was released in 1998.

== Track listing ==
1. "That's How the Yodel Was Born" (Douglas B. Green) – 2:18
2. "Here Comes the Santa Fe" (Green) – 3:11
3. "Cowpoke" (Jones) – 1:42
4. "Riding the Winds of the West" (Green) – 2:14
5. "Back in the Saddle Again" (Gene Autry, Ray Whitley) – 4:00
6. "Blue Montana Skies" (Green) – 3:28
7. "Singing a Song to the Sky" (Green) – 2:29
8. "The First Cowboy Song" (Green, McMahan) – 2:45
9. "The Yodel Blues" (Dolan, Mercer) – 2:24
10. "When the Bloom Is on the Sage" (Vincent, Wright) – 3:21
11. "At the End of the Rainbow Trail" (Green) – 2:10
12. "Desert Serenade" (Green) – 2:59

== Personnel ==
- Douglas B. Green (a.k.a. Ranger Doug) – vocals, guitar
- Paul Chrisman (a.k.a. Woody Paul) – vocals, fiddle
- Fred LaBour (a.k.a. Too Slim) – vocals, bass

also

- Eddie Bayers - percussion
- Louis Brown - trombone
- David Davidson - violin
- Gregg Galbraith - acoustic guitar
- Tommy Goldsmith - acoustic guitar, electric guitar
- Carl Gorodetzky - violin
- Mark Howard - acoustic guitar
- Lee Larrison - violin
- Kenny Malone - percussion
- Bob Mater - drums
- Joey Miskulin - accordion
- Weldon Myrick - steel guitar
- Richard O'Brien - acoustic guitar
- Chris O'Connell - vocals
- Woody Paul - vocals, fiddle, harmonica
- John Probst - accordion
- Kayton Roberts - steel guitar
- Pamela Sixfin - violin
- George Tidwell - trumpet
- Robby Turner - lap steel guitar
- Tommy Wells - drums
- Kristin Wilkinson - viola
- Paul Worley - guitar
- Andrea Zonn - violin, viola
