= The Cowboy Way (album) =

Live album by Riders in the Sky
- Released: 1987
- Genre: Western
- Length: 38:14
- Label: MCA
- Producer: Emory Gordy Jr.

Riders in the Sky chronology
Best of the West (1987)	The Cowboy Way (1987)	Riders Radio Theater (1988)

Professional ratings
Review scores
Source	Rating
AllMusic	3/5 stars

The Cowboy Way is a live recording released by the Western band Riders in the Sky in 1987 (see 1987 in music). It is available as a single CD. This is the second live album recorded by Riders in the Sky.

== Track listing ==
1. "Texas Plains" (Stuart Hamblen) – 2:25
2. "Back in the Saddle Again" (Gene Autry, Ray Whitley) – 1:59
3. "(Ghost) Riders in the Sky" (Stan Jones) – 3:06
4. "Carry Me Back to the Lone Prairie" (Carson J. Robison) – 2:41
5. "Mr. Sincere (State Fair Burnout)" (Douglas B. Green, Fred LaBour, Paul Chrisman) – 1:21
6. "Concerto for Violin and Longhorns" (Chrisman) – 2:31
7. "Lonely Yukon Stars" (Green) – 3:01
8. "The Salting of the Slug" (LaBour) – 4:30
9. "When Payday Rolls Around" (Bob Nolan) – 1:38
10. "My Oklahoma" (Terrye Newkirk) – 2:42
11. "Reincarnation" (Wallace McRae) – 3:06
12. "Miss Molly" (Cindy Walker) – 2:44
13. "Ridin' Down the Canyon (When the Desert Sun Goes Down)" (Gene Autry, Smiley Burnette) – 2:55
14. "That's How the Yodel Was Born" (Green) – 2:09
15. "Happy Trails" (Dale Evans) – 1:26

== Personnel ==
- Douglas B. Green (a.k.a. Ranger Doug) – guitar, vocals
- Paul Chrisman (a.k.a. Woody Paul) – fiddle, vocals
- Fred LaBour (a.k.a. Too Slim) – bass, vocals
