= Riders Radio Theater (album) =

Studio album by Riders in the Sky
- Released: June 27, 1988
- Genre: Western / Humor
- Length: 53:16
- Label: MCA
- Producer: Bruce Hinton, Chip Hardy

Riders in the Sky chronology
The Cowboy Way (1987)	Riders Radio Theater (1988)	Riders Go Commercial (1989)

Riders Radio Theater is a studio album by the Western band Riders in the Sky based on their radio program Riders Radio Theater. It was released in 1988 and it is available as a single CD.

It contains 18 digitally recorded selections. Like the radio program itself, the album includes cowboy music, musical skits, mock "Public Service Announcements", traffic reports, and commercials. It is, in part, a spoof the 1930s era Western singing cowboy serials.

== Track listing ==
1. "The Scene"
2. "Riders Radio Theme"
3. "Chant of the Wanderer"
4. "Udder Butter on a Rope"
5. "Trail Traffic Report"
6. "Sagebrush Sports Report"
7. "Cattle Call"
8. "Bio Feedbag"
9. "Trail Traffic Update"
10. "Call of the Wild"
11. "Triple X Stock Report"
12. "Sundown Blues"
13. "Riders Radio Theme (Reprise)"
14. "Pops"
15. "Saddle Whiz"
16. "Meltdown on the Mesa"
17. "So Long Saddle Pals"
18. "The Long Shot "

== Critical reception ==
Allmusic gave "Riders Radio Theater" a rating of three stars out of five.

== Personnel ==
- Douglas B. Green (a.k.a. Ranger Doug) – guitar, vocals
- Paul Chrisman (a.k.a. Woody Paul) – fiddle, vocals
- Fred LaBour (a.k.a. Too Slim) – bass, vocals
- Steve Arwood (a.k.a. Texas Bix Bender) – narrator
