= Riders Go Commercial =

Studio album by Riders in the Sky
- Released: June 19, 1989
- Genre: Western / Comedy
- Length: 37:45
- Label: MCA
- Producer: Bruce Hinton, Buzz Stone

Riders in the Sky chronology
Riders Radio Theater (1988)	Riders Go Commercial (1989)	Best of the West Rides Again (1989)

Professional ratings
Review scores
Source	Rating
Allmusic	3/5 stars

Riders Go Commercial is a studio recording released by the Western band Riders in the Sky in 1989. It contains spoken comedy skits, commercial satires and six songs. Riders Go Commercial is available as a single CD.

== Track listing ==
1. "The Board Room"
2. "Accordion Repair Course"
3. "Studebaker"
4. "Udder Fantasic"
5. "A Side of Opera"
6. "Perfume, Passion and Polka"
7. "The Queen Elizabeth Trio"
8. "Polkaholism (PSD)"
9. "Cow Paint and Body Shop"
10. "Along the Navajo Trail" ("Dick Charles", Larry Markes, Edgar De Lange)
11. "There's a Blue Sky Way Out Yonder" (Fred Hall, Bert Van Cleve, and Arthur Fields)
12. "Geezer Training Course"
13. "No Rodeo Dough" (Cy Coben, John Jacob Loeb, Lewis Harris)
14. "Riding the Old Front Range"
15. "Ride With Me Gringo"
16. "Toolkit in a Holster""

== Personnel ==
- Douglas B. Green (a.k.a. Ranger Doug)
- Paul Chrisman (a.k.a. Woody Paul)
- Fred LaBour (a.k.a. Too Slim)
