= Saddle Pals =

Studio album by Riders in the Sky
- Released: 1985
- Studio: Studio 19, Nashville, Tennessee
- Genre: Western swing, Children's
- Length: 24:52
- Label: Rounder
- Producer: Riders in the Sky, Robby Adcock

Riders in the Sky chronology
Live (1984)	Saddle Pals (1985)	New Trails (1986)

Professional ratings
Review scores
Source	Rating
Allmusic	link

Saddle Pals is an album by the Western swing band Riders in the Sky, released in 1985. It is directed toward a children's audience.

== Track listing ==
1. "Yippie-Yi-Yo and Away We Go" (Paul Chrisman) – 2:11
2. "The Old Chisholm Trail" (Traditional) – 2:34
3. "Get Along, Little Doggies" (Traditional) – 1:57
4. "Biscuit Blues" (Bob Nolan) – 3:25
5. "Sweet Betsy from Pike" (Traditional) – 2:27
6. "There's a Great Big Candy Roundup" (Joe Estella, Dick Manning, Louis Robino) – 2:06
7. "I'm Going to Leave Old Texas Now" (Traditional) – 3:08
8. "The Cowboy's ABCs" (Douglas B. Green) – 2:57
9. "Clementine" (Traditional) – 2:45
10. "One, Two, Three, Said the Miner" (Green) – 2:14
11. "Fiddle Medley" (Traditional) – 2:44
12. "Down the Lullabye Trail" (Green) – 3:06

== Personnel ==
- Guitar: Gary Burnette, Steve Gibson, Doug Green, Fred LaBour,
  Woody Paul. Mandolin: Gary Burnette
- Banjo: Doug Green, Woody Paul
- Bass: Fred LaBour, Joe Osborn
- Keyboards: Dennis Burnside
- Drums: Eddie Bayers, Darren Osborn
- Percussion: Robby Adcock, Doug Green, Fred LaBour, Woody Paul
- Harmonica: Buddy Greene
- Fiddle: Paul Chrisman, Woody Paul
- Vocals – Doug Green, Fred LaBour, Woody Paul
- Backing Vocals: Robby Adcock
