= Weeds & Water =

Weeds and Water

Studio album by Riders in the Sky
- Released: 1983
- Studio: Woodland Studios, Nashville, Tennessee; Audio Innovators, Pittsburgh, Pennsylvania
- Length: 28:38
- Label: Rounder
- Producer: Riders in the Sky

Riders in the Sky chronology
| Prairie Serenade (1982) | Weeds and Water (1983) | Live (1984) |

Professional ratings
Review scores
| Source | Rating |
|---|---|
| Allmusic | 2/5 stars |

Weeds and Water is the fourth studio album by the Western band Riders in the Sky, released in 1983. It is available as a single CD. The album features cowboy music standards like "Cool Water," "Tumbling Tumbleweeds" and "Streets of Laredo," along with several originals.

This album was first released in the early 1980s as a direct-mail TV package. It was remixed and remastered in 1983, with the steel guitar of Kayton Roberts replacing the original steel tracks.

== Track listing ==
1. "Cool Water" (Bob Nolan) – 3:19
2. "West Texas Cowboy" (Paul Chrisman) – 2:54
3. "La Cucaracha" (Traditional) – 2:47
4. "Streets of Laredo (The Cowboy's Lament)" (Traditional) – 3:03
5. "Singing a Song to the Sky" (Douglas B. Green) – 2:24
6. "Tumbling Tumbleweeds" (Nolan) – 3:55
7. "Pecos Bill" (Eliot Daniel, Johnny Lange) – 2:21
8. "That's How the Yodel Was Born" (Green) – 2:13
9. "Wasteland" (Green) – 3:27
10. "Bound to Hit the Trail" (Chrisman) – 2:15

== Personnel ==
- Douglas B. Green (a.k.a. Ranger Doug) – guitar, vocals
- Paul Chrisman (a.k.a. Woody Paul) – fiddle, vocals
- Fred LaBour (a.k.a. Too Slim) – bass, vocals
- Kayton Roberts – steel guitar
- Bob Mater – drums
