= A Pair of Kings (album) =

Studio album by Riders in the Sky
- Released: February 19, 2002
- Genre: Western
- Label: Oh Boy
- Producer: Joey Miskulin

Riders in the Sky chronology
Woody's Roundup: A Rootin' Tootin' Collection of Woody's Favorite Songs (2000)	A Pair of Kings (2002)	Ridin' the Tweetsie Railroad (2002)

Professional ratings
Review scores
Source	Rating
Allmusic	3/5 stars

A Pair of Kings is a studio recording released by the Western band Riders in the Sky on February 19, 2002. It is available as a single CD.

The "pair of kings" referenced in the album's title are featured Riders Joey "the Cowpolka King" Miskulin and Woody Paul, King of the Cowboy Fiddlers. Allmusic stated in their review: "These four diehards are one of the few acts still making records in the traditional cowboy style, and their releases each deserve all of the recognition they get."

== Track listing ==
1. "We're Burnin' Moonlight" (Joey Miskulin) – 2:15
2. "Clarinet Polka" – 2:17
3. "You Stole My Wife You Horsethief" (Reif, Sims) – 2:43
4. "How High the Moon" (Hamilton, Lewis) – 3:34
5. "Texas Sand" – 2:21
6. "Celtic Medley – Annie Laurie/Scotland the Brave/Haste to the Wedding" – 3:29
7. "I'm an Old Cowhand" (Johnny Mercer) – 2:38
8. "Jessie Polka" – 2:32
9. "Never Go to Church on Sunday" (Paul) – 2:22
10. "The Bunkhouse Race" (Dizzy Fingers) – 2:08
11. "Don't Sweetheart Me" (Friend, Tobias)– 2:27
12. "Katherine's Waltz" (Paul) – 2:51

== Personnel ==
- Douglas B. Green (a.k.a. Ranger Doug) – vocals, guitar
- Paul Chrisman (a.k.a. Woody Paul) – vocals, fiddle
- Fred LaBour (a.k.a. Too Slim) – vocals, bass
- Joey Miskulin (a.k.a. Joey The Cowpolka King) – vocals, accordion
