= Saturday Morning with Riders =

Compilation album by Riders in the Sky
- Released: 1992
- Genre: Western
- Length: 28:18
- Label: MCA

Riders in the Sky chronology
Merry Christmas from Harmony Ranch (1992)	Saturday Morning with Riders (1992)	Cowboys in Love (1994)

Professional ratings
Review scores
Source	Rating
Allmusic	2/5 stars

Saturday Morning with Riders is a studio recording released by the Western band Riders in the Sky in 1992 (see 1992 in music). It is available as a single CD.

== Track listing ==
1. "Texas Plains"
2. "Back In The Saddle Again"
3. "(Ghost) Riders In The Sky"
4. "That's How The Yodel Was Born"
5. "Someone's Got To Do It"
6. "Ride Cowboy Ride"
7. "The Queen Elizabeth Trio"
8. "There's A Blue Sky Way Out Yonder"
9. "The Cattle Call"
10. "So Long Saddle Pals"

== Personnel ==
- Douglas B. Green (a.k.a. Ranger Doug) – vocals, guitar
- Paul Chrisman (a.k.a. Woody Paul) – vocals, fiddle
- Fred LaBour (a.k.a. Too Slim) – vocals, bass
