= Merry Christmas from Harmony Ranch =

Studio album by Riders in the Sky
- Released: 1992
- Genre: Western
- Length: 28:18
- Label: MCA

Riders in the Sky chronology
Harmony Ranch (1991)	Merry Christmas from Harmony Ranch (1992)	Saturday Morning with Riders (1992)

Professional ratings
Review scores
Source	Rating
Allmusic	link

Merry Christmas from Harmony Ranch is a studio recording released by the Western band Riders in the Sky in 1992. It is available as a single CD.

== Track listing ==
1. "Here Comes Santa Claus" (Gene Autry, Oakley Haldeman) – 1:38
2. "Silver Bells" (Jay Livingston, Ray Evans) – 2:43
3. "Rudolph the Red-Nosed Reindeer" – 2:16
4. "White Christmas" (Irving Berlin) – 3:18
5. "Navidad y Año Nuevo" (Navarro) – 2:49
6. "Christmas Time's A-Coming" (Logan) – 2:11
7. "Deck the Bunkhouse Walls" – 0:32
8. "Sidemeat's Christmas Goose" (Douglas Green) – 2:44
9. "Riding Home on Christmas Eve" (Green) – 2:44
10. "Merry Christmas from Harmony Ranch/Jingle Bells" – 2:10
11. "Christmas Carol Medley/Greatest Gifts" – 7:17

== Personnel ==
- Douglas B. Green (a.k.a. Ranger Doug) – vocals, guitar
- Paul Chrisman (a.k.a. Woody Paul) – vocals, fiddle
- Fred LaBour (a.k.a. Too Slim) – vocals, string bass

== References / Sources ==
- Riders in the Sky Official Website
