= New Trails =

Studio album by Riders in the Sky
- Released: January 1, 1986
- Genre: Western
- Label: Rounder
- Producer: Robby Adcock

Riders in the Sky chronology
Saddle Pals (1985)	New Trails (1986)	Best of the West (1987)

Professional ratings
Review scores
Source	Rating
Allmusic	link

New Trails is a studio recording by the Western band Riders in the Sky, released in 1986. It is available as a single CD.

Following their Live album in 1986, the trio returned to the studio, presenting several traditional Western songs, as well as some of their own creations.

== Track listing ==
1. "Cimarron" (Johnny Bond) – 2:23
2. "Trail of Tears" (Lee Domann, Pebe Sebert, Ralph Whiteway) – 2:46
3. "I'm Satisfied With You" (Fred Rose) – 2:03
4. "Even Texas Isn't Big Enough Now" (Kerry Chater, Patti Dahlstrom) – 2:59
5. "Slow Poke" (Pee Wee King, Chilton Price, Redd Stewart) – 2:24
6. "Blue Bonnet Lady" (Paul Chrisman) – 2:45
7. "Cowboy of the Highway" (Chrisman) – 2:59
8. "Anytime" (Herbert Lawson) – 2:28
9. "All Those Years" (Douglas B. Green) – 3:23
10. "Soon as the Roundup's Through" (Chrisman) – 3:06

== Personnel ==
- Eddie Bayers – drums, percussion
- Bruce Bouton – steel guitar
- Gary Burnette – guitar
- Dennis Burnside – keyboards
- Paul Chrisman – fiddle, vocals
- Sonny Garrish – steel guitar
- Steve Gibson – guitar
- Buddy Greene – harmonica, piano
- Douglas B. Green – guitar, vocals
- Fred LaBour – bass, vocals
- Joe Osborn – bass
- Larry Sasser – steel guitar
- Paul Worley – guitar
- Buck White – piano
- Robby Adcock – background vocals
- Michael Black – background vocals
- Scott Jarrett – background vocals
