= Riders in the Sky =

Riders in the Sky may refer to:

- "(Ghost) Riders in the Sky: A Cowboy Legend", a 1948 country and cowboy-style song
- Riders in the Sky (band), named after the song
- Riders in the Sky, a 1983 album by David and the Giants
- Riders in the Sky (film), a 1949 film directed by John English
- Riders of the Sky (Czech: "Nebeští jezdci"), a 1968 Czech film
- Riders in the Sky (TV series), 1991
- Riders in the Sky, Live, a 1984 album by Riders in the Sky
- Riders in the Sky, a 1976 debut album by Matchbox
