= Gary McMahan =

American singer-songwriter

Gary McMahan (born 1948 in Greeley, Colorado) is an American Western music singer-songwriter, yodeler, humorist and cowboy poet, known for his wide-ranging influence in post-19th century Western music and poetry, and for writing "The Old Double Diamond", which members of the Western Writers of America chose as one of the Top 100 Western songs of all time.

== Early life ==
McMahan's father owned a cattle trucking business in Greeley. Gary traveled with his father as a child, spending time in and around the ranches, feedlots, and rodeo arenas of Northern Colorado and neighboring states. Beginning in his teenage years he rode bareback broncs and saddle broncs in rodeos, also trying his hand at calf roping and steer roping, even winning the money in a few events. He tried his hand at bull riding, but was "never any good at it". Before entering the world of Western music and poetry, he worked as a cowboy, rodeo performer, and guide, where he learned to wrangle, drive teams, shoe horses, brand, calve, rope, fence, and pack. Later, he often referred to those activities in his poems and songs. After two years studying animal science at Colorado State University and a stint as a Vietnam-era Navy corpsman, he made a conscious decision to become a cowboy songwriter.

== Career ==
In the early seventies he moved to Nashville, where he hung out with aspiring Western artists Fred (Too Slim) LaBour, Chris LeDoux, and Ian Tyson. After five years in Nashville, he moved back to Colorado. While living there, he was signed by New York-based Tomato Records. At the time, that label had only four artists: Dick Gregory, Townes Van Zandt, Philip Glass, and he.

Since then, McMahan has written over 300 songs and poems and recorded six albums. His songs have been recorded by artists such as the now-famous Chris LeDoux, Ian Tyson, and Riders in the Sky (featuring Fred LaBour). The Western Music Association named him National Champion Yodeler in 1991. In 1992 he earned the National Cowboy Hall of Fame Wrangler Award for writing the year's best cowboy song. His performing career got a boost when he was invited to perform at the first National Cowboy Poetry Gathering in 1985. He saw that audiences liked what he was doing, and Baxter Black encouraged him to do more of it. Today he mostly entertains at banquets, concerts, and events such as the National Gathering and the Colorado Cowboy Gathering, which he co-founded in 1988.

In a 2014 interview, McMahan said "I’ve made my living with either a horse or guitar or both for the last 40 years, and it’s been a great life."
