= Cowboy Jubilee =

Studio album by Riders in the Sky
- Released: 1981
- Studio: Creative Workshop (Berry Hill, Tennessee)
- Genre: Western
- Length: 31:37
- Label: Rounder
- Producer: Riders in the Sky

Riders in the Sky chronology
Three on the Trail (1980)	Cowboy Jubilee (1981)	Prairie Serenade (1982)

Professional ratings
Review scores
Source	Rating
Allmusic	3/5 stars

Cowboy Jubilee is the second studio album by the Western band Riders in the Sky, released in 1981, featuring a title track originally written by Ken Carson of the Sons of the Pioneers. This album features the demanding art of yodeling in harmony; the Riders create arrangements worthy of their original inspirations, Sons of the Pioneers. Originally released on vinyl in 1981 and as a CD in 1990, this album includes their own originals (including "Compadres in the Old Sierra Madres") that compare favorably with their versions of older Western classics.

This album was featured on The New York Times' "Best Ten List" for 1982 and was voted "Best Independent Country Album of the Year".

== Track listing ==
1. "Cowboy Jubilee (Fred LaBour, Paul Chrisman) – 1:32
2. "Ol' Cowpoke" (Gary McMahan) – 2:39
3. "Compadres in the Old Sierra Madre" (Chrisman) – 2:39
4. "Back in the Saddle Again" (Gene Autry, Ray Whitley) – 3:45
5. "Desperado Trail" (Chrisman) – 2:54
6. "Red River Valley" (public domain) – 2:44
7. "Ride With the Wind" (Douglas B. Green) – 3:32
8. "Soon as the Roundup's Through" (Chrisman) – 2:02
9. "On the Rhythm Range" (Bob Nolan) – 2:51
10. "Riding Alone" (Green) – 2:12
11. "Ojo Caliente" (Tommy Goldsmith) – 1:59
12. "At the End of the Rainbow Trail" (Green) – 2:48

== Personnel ==
- Douglas B. Green (a.k.a. Ranger Doug) – guitar, vocals
- Paul Chrisman (a.k.a. Woody Paul) – fiddle, guitar, accordion, harmonica, vocals
- Fred LaBour (a.k.a. Too Slim) – bass, guitar, accordion, vocals
- Thomas Goldsmith – guitar
- Kayton Roberts – steel guitar
- Kenny Malone – percussion
- Louis Brown – horn

Production notes

- Todd Cerney – engineer
- Leonard Kamsler – photography
- Susan Marsh – design
- Denny Purcell – mastering
