= Silver Jubilee (Riders in the Sky album) =

Compilation album by Riders in the Sky
- Released: 2003
- Genre: Western
- Label: Acoustic Disc ACD55

Riders in the Sky chronology
Monsters, Inc. Scream Factory Favorites (2002)	Silver Jubilee (2003)	Davy Crockett, King of the Wild Frontier (2004)

Professional ratings
Review scores
Source	Rating
AllMusic	link

Silver Jubilee is a compilation recording released by the Western band Riders in the Sky in 2003.

Riders in the Sky brought their 25th anniversary year to a grand finale with Silver Jubilee, a 2-CD set of new recordings of their best-loved songs — along with a bonus live mini-concert.

Longtime favorites "Compadres In The Old Sierra Madres," "Here Comes The Santa Fe," "The Biscuit Blues" and "That's How The Yodel Was Born" are among the standouts on Silver Jubilee. Often requested tunes including "The Line Rider," "Sidekick Heaven," and "La Malaguena" are included, as well as a medley from their Riders Radio Theater program. Silver Jubilee also contains a 24-page booklet complete with extensive notes, archival photos and a special Riders timeline.

== Track listing ==
=== Disc 1 ===
1. "Texas Plain" (Hamblin) – 2:33
2. "Cool Water" (Bob Nolan) – 3:33
3. "Back in the Saddle Again" (Gene Autry, Ray Whitley) – 4:03
4. "Compadres in the Old Sierra Madres" (Paul Chrisman) – 3:14
5. "Sidekick Heaven" (Fred Labour) – 6:01
6. "Blue Bonnet Lady" (Chrisman) – 2:48
7. "(Ghost) Riders in the Sky" (Jones) – 3:43
8. "The Line Rider" (Doublas B. Green) – 3:14
9. "We're Burnin' Moonlight" (Joey Miskulin) – 2:16
10. "Phantom of the Chuckwagon" (Labour) – 2:15
11. "La Malaguena" – 4:23
12. "Here Comes the Santa Fe" (Green) – 3:17
13. "The Arms of My Love" (Chrisman) – 3:32
14. "Salting of the Slug" (Labour) – 2:12
15. "Way Out There" (Nolan) – 2:24
16. "Tumbling Tumbleweeds" (Nolan) – 3:22

=== Disc 2 ===
1. "Ride Cowboy Ride" (Allen, Allen, Demarco) – 2:13
2. "Ringo" (Blair, Robertson) – 3:50
3. "The Biscuit Blues" (Nolan) – 2:53
4. "Lonely Yukon Stars" (Green) – 3:05
5. "That's How the Yodel Was Born" (Green) – 2:02
6. "Blue Montana Skies" (Green) – 3:13
7. "Woody's Roundup" (Newman) – 1:58
8. "Reincarnation/Sundown in Santa Fe" (Green, McRae) – 1:52
9. "My Oklahoma" (Newkirk) – 3:20

=== Bonus Tracks (Live At The Renaissance) ===
1. "Wah-Hoo" (Brown, DeSylva, Friend, Henderson) – 3:47
2. "Early Autumn" (Green) – 3:07
3. "Rawhide" (Tiomkin, Washington) – 5:57
4. "You're Wearing Out Your Welcome, Matt" (Kent, Scott) – 5:42
5. "Questions" (Labour) – 6:49
6. "There's a Blue Sky Way Out Yonder" (Fields, Hall, Van Cleve) – 2:25
7. "Riders Radio Theatre Medley/So Long Saddle Pals" (Chrisman, Labour) – 6:12
8. "The Cowboy Way" (Chrisman, Green) – 1:33

== Personnel ==
- Douglas B. Green (a.k.a. Ranger Doug) – vocals, guitar
- Paul Chrisman (a.k.a. Woody Paul) – vocals, fiddle
- Fred LaBour (a.k.a. Too Slim) – vocals, bass
- Joey Miskulin (a.k.a. Joey The Cowpolka King) – vocals, accordion
