= Public Cowboy No. 1 (album) =

Public Cowboy #1: The Music of Gene Autry

Studio album by Riders in the Sky
- Released: October 22, 1996
- Genre: Western
- Length: 38:46
- Label: Rounder

Riders in the Sky chronology
Cowboy Songs (1996)	Public Cowboy #1: The Music of Gene Autry (1996)	Yodel the Cowboy Way (1998)

Professional ratings
Review scores
Source	Rating
Allmusic	4.5/5 stars

Public Cowboy #1 is a studio recording released on CD by the Western band Riders in the Sky on October 22, 1996.

== Critical reception ==
According to AllMusic's Bruce Eder, the Riders in the Sky created this album in the wake of performing a Gene Autry medley on television with Autry himself in the audience.

The songs are done reverently but with a real sense of fun, essentially the same balancing act that has made them a success on stage and television. Their main innovations are the harmony singing, which works well throughout, and a jazzy approach to Jimmie Rodgers' "Can't Shake The Sands of Texas From My Shoes." Autry's versions have held up magnificently well, but this loving tribute album is a necessary addition to any fan's collection.

In another review, James H. Nottage wrote:

Gene Autry's music was always more than something which fed childhood fantasies. It is still more than something which fuels or expresses adult nostalgia. A life-time of writing, performing, and recording music marks Gene Autry as an undeniable influence on his diverse audiences, on the development of Western music, and on the image of the cowboy. Even a performer as important as Autry could be forgotten in time if it were not for a new generation which records his music. We are fortunate that the Riders are of our time and have offered such an instrumental and vocal tribute which stands as a respectful interpretation of Gene Autry's cowboy classics. Let Riders in the Sky take you on a journey through our collective musical heritage. It is a trip worth taking.

== Track listing ==
1. "Back in the Saddle Again" (Gene Autry, Ray Whitley) – 3:58
2. "Sioux City Sue" (Ray Freedman, Dick Thomas) – 2:39
3. "Mexicali Rose" (Helen Stone, Jack Tenney) – 2:48
4. "You Are My Sunshine" (Jimmie Davis, Charles Mitchell) – 3:24
5. "Have I Told You Lately That I Love You?" (Scott Wiseman) – 3:39
6. "Can't Shake the Sands of Texas from My Shoes" (Autry, Johnston, Pitts) – 2:55
7. "That Silver Haired Daddy of Mine" (Autry, Jimmy Long) – 3:50
8. "Be Honest with Me" (Autry, Fred Rose) – 2:20
9. "Blue Canadian Rockies" (Autry, Cindy Walker) – 2:45
10. "Lonely River" (Autry, Fred Rose, Ray Whitley) – 3:02
11. "South of the Border" (Michael Carr, Jimmy Kennedy) – 3:13
12. "Ridin' Down the Canyon" (Autry, Smiley Burnette) – 4:16

== Personnel ==
- Douglas B. Green (a.k.a. Ranger Doug) – vocals, guitar
- Paul Chrisman (a.k.a. Woody Paul) – vocals, fiddle
- Fred LaBour (a.k.a. Too Slim) – vocals, bass
