= Silver Jubilee (disambiguation) =

Silver Jubilee is a celebration held to mark a 25th anniversary.

Silver Jubilee may also refer to:

- Silver Jubilee (Riders in the Sky album), 2003
- Silver Jubilee (Sex Pistols album), 2002
- Silver Jubilee (train), a named train of the London and North Eastern Railway (LNER)
- "Silver Jubilee", a 2025 song by Audrey Hobert from Who's the Clown?
