= Three on the Trail =

Studio album by Riders in the Sky
- Released: 1979
- Recorded: 1979
- Studio: Audio Media, Nashville, Tennessee
- Genre: Western
- Length: 30:08
- Label: Rounder
- Producer: Russ Miller

Riders in the Sky chronology
Three on the Trail (1979)	Cowboy Jubilee (1981)

Professional ratings
Review scores
Source	Rating
Allmusic	4.5/5 stars

Three on the Trail is the debut studio album by the Western band Riders in the Sky, released in 1979 by Rounder Records Group.

Riders in the Sky specializes in Western singing in the style of the Sons of the Pioneers; the Riders became one of Rounder's most popular groups for their vocals and good humor.

== Track listing ==
1. "Three on the Trail" (Douglas B. Green) – 1:57
2. "Riders in the Sky" (Stan Jones) – 3:15
3. "That's How the Yodel Was Born" (Green) – 3:15
4. "Don't Fence Me In" (Cole Porter) – 2:35
5. "Blue Montana Skies" (Green) – 3:26
6. "When Payday Rolls Around" (Bob Nolan) – 1:47
7. "Cowboy Song" (Paul Chrisman) – 3:03
8. "Skyball Paint" (Nolan) – 1:29
9. "Blue Bonnet Lady" (Chrisman) – 2:50
10. "Cielito Lindo" (Traditional) – 1:59
11. "Here Comes the Santa Fe" (Green) – 3:09
12. "So Long Saddle Pals" (Chrisman) – 1:23

== Personnel ==
- Douglas B. Green (a.k.a. Ranger Doug) – guitar, vocals
- Paul Chrisman (a.k.a. Woody Paul) – fiddle, guitar, banjo, vocals
- Fred LaBour (a.k.a. Too Slim) – bass, vocals
- Weldon Myrick – steel guitar
- Eddie Bayers – percussion
- Dennis Burnside – vibraphone
- John Probst – accordion
- Paul Worley – guitar
