= Riders in the Sky, Live =

Live

Live album by Riders in the Sky
- Released: January 1, 1984
- Recorded: March 5 and 6, 1983
- Venue: The Birchmere in Alexandria, VA
- Genre: Western
- Label: Rounder

Riders in the Sky chronology
Weeds & Water (1983)	Live (1984)	Saddle Pals (1985)

Professional ratings
Review scores
Source	Rating
Allmusic	link

Live is a live recording by the Western band Riders in the Sky released in 1984. It is available as a single CD. It was recorded at the Birchmere in Alexandria, Virginia, on March 5 and 6, 1983.

After four studio albums, Riders in the Sky recorded a live album of the kind of show that keeps their fans coming back for more. Along with versions of their songs, this album is highlighted by some of the Riders' best comedy routines.

== Track listing ==
1. "Cowboy Jubilee" (Fred LaBour, Paul Chrisman)
2. "The Yodel Blues" (Robert Dolan, Johnny Mercer)
3. "When Bloom Is on the Sage" (John Vincent, Fred Wright)
4. "After You've Gone" (Henry Creamer, John Layton)
5. "Cowboy Song" (Chrisman)
6. "Hold That Critter Down" (Bob Nolan)
7. "Cielito Lindo" (Traditional)
8. "The Last Roundup" (Billy Hill)
9. "I Grab My Saddle Horn and Blow" (Nolan)
10. "Blue Bonnet Lady" (Chrisman)
11. "When Payday Rolls Around" (Nolan)
12. "So Long Saddle Pals" (Chrisman)

== Personnel ==
- Douglas B. Green (a.k.a. Ranger Doug) – guitar, vocals
- Paul Chrisman (a.k.a. Woody Paul) – fiddle, vocals
- Fred LaBour (a.k.a. Too Slim) – bass, vocals
