= Riders in the Sky (TV series) =

1991 American children's TV series

- Genre: Western children's comedy
- Based on: Characters created by Riders in the Sky
- Written by: George McGrath
- Directed by: Gary Halvorson
- Starring: Riders in the Sky (band)
- Narrated by: George McGrath
- Country of origin: United States
- No. of seasons: 1
- No. of episodes: 13

Production
- Producers: Chris Plourde, George McGrath, Alan Sacks
- Production location: CBS Studio Center
- Editor: Robert S. Douglas

Original release
- Network: CBS
- Release: September 14 – December 7, 1991

Riders in the Sky is an American live-action/animated children's television series starring Western comedy band Riders in the Sky. Intentionally designed as a spiritual successor to Pee-wee's Playhouse (reusing many of the Playhouse production crew), the series aired on CBS from September 14 to December 7, 1991.

Though the series was neither a critical or ratings success, Riders in the Sky won a Daytime Emmy for Outstanding Achievement in Costume Design in 1992.

== Format ==
The series follows the lives of the singing cowboy band Riders in the Sky (Ranger Doug, Woody Paul, and Too Slim), who live on Harmony Ranch with their sidekick Sourdough (Patrick Bristow) and several other characters. While Harmony Ranch is the primary setting, the ranch is located in Tumbleweed Valley, a stereotypical western town somewhere near the Rio Grande populated by both human and puppet characters. Every episode featured song performances from Riders in the Sky, with one song (typically the second song, though this was not the case for every episode) featuring sing-along lyrics at the bottom of the screen.

Each episode of the series contained either a two-part The Adventures of Riders in the Sky segment or one animated Gila Monster short. The Adventures of Riders in the Sky segments were loosely based upon movie serials of the 1930s, but more closely resembled the 1966 Batman television series, featuring the Riders initially starting out first part of the segments in contemporary settings (like a suburban neighborhood or modern grocery store) confronting over-the-top supervillain characters before getting captured in a cliffhanger situation. The second part of The Adventures of Riders in the Sky would come later in the same episode, seeing the Riders escape the perilous situation and defeat the villain. These segments would be introduced in the main show via a "magic lasso" spun by Woody Paul, in which the cast of characters would watch the serialized adventure through a magic portal opened by the lasso loop.

In episodes in which there was not an Adventures of Riders in the Sky serial, the characters would instead watch an animated short installment of Gila Monster, a parody of Godzilla and other 1950s monster movies, on the bunkhouse "thing-a-ma-jig." Produced by Olive Jar Animation and commissioned specifically for the Riders in the Sky series, the Gila Monster shorts typically ran between one minute or one minute and thirty seconds in length, and featured stop-motion animated characters in mundane locations (such as a restaurant or bingo hall) before suddenly being "terrorized" by a live-action, slow-moving Gila monster roaming the set.

All 13 episodes of the series conclude with the Riders speaking directly to the viewer and discussing "The Cowboy Way", a lesson learned by the characters by the episode's end. It is then followed by a performance of the song "So Long, Saddle Pals", which the real life incarnation of the band used to close live performances, several of their albums, as well as their other television projects.

== Characters ==
=== Human characters ===
- Riders in the Sky
  - Ranger Doug (portrayed by Douglas B. Green; credited as "himself") - The level-headed leader of Riders in the Sky, as well as the band's guitarist and vocalist.
  - Too Slim (portrayed by Fred LaBour; credited as "himself") - Riders in the Sky's bass player, vocalist, and cook.
  - Woody Paul (portrayed by Paul Chrisman; credited as "himself") - An inventor, fiddle player extraordinaire and vocalist in the band.
- Sourdough (Patrick Bristow) - Riders in the Sky's energetic sidekick and primary animal caretaker on Harmony Ranch. Sourdough functions similarly to "Side Meat", a character portrayed by Too Slim in other Riders in the Sky projects.
- The Saddle Pals - A trio of Tumbleweed Valley kids who are fans of Riders in the Sky. They consist of Butch (Christopher Babers), Sally (Leia Kim), and Bobby (Gabe Witcher).
- Miss N. Formation (Deanna Oliver) - A ditzy schoolmarm in Tumbleweed Valley.
- Princess Little Running Bear That Frolics In The Cave of The Mighty Waterfall (Dawanna Murrell) - A Native American teenager who prefers to simply go by "Princess."
- Axl (Stan Kirsch) - A teenage "rock and roll" Pony Express rider who rides a motorcycle.
- Señor Señor (Al Rodrigo) - A heroic Zorro-like caballero.
- Slocum (B.J. Turner) - A stereotypical western businessman villain. He is a retooling of the "A. Swineburn Slocum" character portrayed by Too Slim in other Riders in the Sky projects.
- Muley (Jim Doughan) - Slocum's dim-witted henchman. He is a retooling of the "Charlie" character portrayed by Ranger Doug in other Riders in the Sky projects.
- Doctor Holiday (Cleveland O'Neal) - A parody of Doc Holiday.

=== Puppet characters ===
- Teacher's Pet (Julianne Buescher) - A student of Miss N. Formation at the Tumbleweed Valley schoolhouse.
- Calamity (Julianne Buescher)
- Buffalo Bill (Deryl Carroll) - A large friendly buffalo that roams through Tumbleweed Valley and Harmony Ranch.
- Chili Head (Deryl Carroll) - A sentient pot of chili on the stove inside the bunkhouse.
- The Burps (Kevin Carlson)
- Mr. Adler (Van Snowden) - A talking turkey buzzard.
- Wild Bill Hiccup (Van Snowden)
- Annie Oak (Lynne M. Stewart) - A cowgirl ventriloquist dummy living at Harmony Ranch.
- Commotion (Lynne M. Stewart)
- Two Jaws (Fred LaBour) - A longhorn steer skull mounted on top of the Harmony Ranch bunkhouse.
- Harry Coyote (Wayne White) - A skittish coyote.
- Carla Cactus (Luisa Lechin) - An anthropomorphic cactus living near the corral on Harmony Ranch.

=== Other characters ===
- The Announcer (George McGrath) - The announcer of all The Adventures of Riders In The Sky segments, only physically appearing in the first cliffhanger segment featured in the episode Sourdough's Surprise.
- Turbo (credited as "himself") - Ranger Doug's palomino wonder horse. A parody of Gene Autry's Champion and Roy Rogers' Trigger.
- Tormenta (credited as "herself") - Señor Señor's horse. A parody of Zorro's horse Tornado.
- The Bad Brothers - Outlaws that Riders in the Sky had helped put in prison sometime before the series began, consisting of Barney Bad (Tim de Zarn) and Buck Bad (Lawrence Hilton-Jacobs).
- The Mail Order Brides - Maisie (Douglas B. Green), Myrtle (Paul Chrisman), and Maude (Fred LaBour) are three mail order brides mistakenly ordered by Woody Paul in Episode 13.

=== Guest stars ===
- Ray Sharkey as Spongehead (Episode 1)
- Robert Hegyes as The Potato Person (Episode 5)
- Julia Sweeney as Tunga Tujunga (Episode 6)
- Ricki Lake as Broadway Baby (Episode 9)
- Mike Capellupo as Crabby (Episode 10)

== Production ==
=== Development ===
Riders in the Sky was originally pitched as a sitcom in which the Riders moved from a frontier town in the American west to Hollywood, California, with most of the humor of the series coming from the trio being "fish out of water". The idea was unappealing to television executives due to the premise sounding too similar to that of The Beverly Hillbillies, and the show was passed on. Later, producer Alan Sacks developed the idea of a children's show starring the Riders and pitched it to CBS executives, who after seeing the Riders perform, were immediately interested.

=== Writing and filming ===
CBS assigned George McGrath to write the series, although Sacks would later say, "that was a big mistake, we should have had the Riders writing." The series began taping on July 17 and wrapped up on September 14, 1991, the same day it premiered.

=== Crew ===
- Puppets by the Puppet Studio
- Producers - Chris Plourde, George McGrath, Alan Sacks
- Costume Designers – Jacqueline Saint Anne, Roberta Samet
- Camera Operator – Keeth Lawrence
- Animatronic Puppeteer – Kirk Skodis
- Sound Mixer- Laura King
- Sound Effects Editor – Chris Trent
- Videotape – Scott Tuchman

=== Tie-in album ===
A few weeks before the series premiered, Riders in the Sky released Harmony Ranch, their second children's album and their first on the Columbia Records label. The album features characters from the show on the cover and takes its name from the Riders' home in the series.

=== Broadcast ===
Riders in the Sky aired on Saturday mornings as part of the CBS Kid TV programming block. During the course of the show's original broadcast run, it was shifted down the network schedule each week, with the first episode airing at eight in the morning (Eastern Time) and the final episode airing at 12:30 PM. During this time, the show was also often the subject of preemption on the west coast due to college football games. CBS later rebroadcast the series during the fall of 1992.

== Episodes ==
All 13 episodes of the series were directed by Gary Halvorson.

#	Title	Airdate	Written by	Plot	Songs	Other Segments
1	Saddle Pals	September 14, 1991	George McGrath	Riders in the Sky introduce the viewers to Harmony Ranch, the Saddle Pals, and the colorful characters of Tumbleweed Valley.	Back in the Saddle Again (Gene Autry, Ray Whitley); There's A Great Big Candy Roundup (Louis Robino, Joe Estella, Dick Manning)	The Adventures of Riders in the Sky: Riders in the Sky vs. Spongehead
2	Harmony Ranch	September 21, 1991	George McGrath	The sinister Slocum hatches a plot to steal Harmony Ranch through phony paperwork presented to Riders in the Sky.	Ride Cowboy Ride (Curtis Allen, Rex Allen Jr, Denny Demarco); Home on the Range (Brewster Higley)	Gila Monster: French restaurant
3	Horsenapped	September 28, 1991	George McGrath	Slocum and Muley steal Turbo from Harmony Ranch. In a last-ditch effort, the Riders call in the legendary caballero Señor Señor for assistance.	Cool Water (Bob Nolan)	Gila Monster: Bingo hall
4	Save the Buffalo	October 5, 1991	Mark Curtis, Rod Ash, and George McGrath	After an over-dramatic encounter with a cactus thorn, Buffalo Bill pledges eternal allegiance to Riders in the Sky after they remove the prickle, but the Riders find the big bison to be a bit of a nuance around their little ranch.	That's How The Yodel Was Born (Douglas B. Green); Don't Fence Me In (Cole Porter, Robert Fletcher)	Gila Monster: Backyard BBQ
5	Cook Out	October 12, 1991	Mark Curtis, Rod Ash, and George McGrath	Riders in the Sky host a cook out at Harmony Ranch, inviting all their friends and neighbors from Tumbleweed Valley to join them.	Ghost Riders in the Sky (Stan Jones); Varmint Dance Medley: Turkey in the Straw/Chicken Reel; The Cowboy ABCs (Douglas B. Green)	The Adventures of Riders in the Sky: Riders in the Sky vs. The Potato Person
6	Sourdough's Surprise	October 19, 1991	George McGrath	Riders in the Sky and the Saddle Pals plan a surprise party at Harmony Ranch for Sourdough's birthday.	Cimarron (Roll on) (Johnny Bond)	The Adventures of Riders in the Sky: Riders in the Sky vs. Tunga Tujunga
7	Muley's Revenge	October 26, 1991	Mark Curtis, Rod Ash, and George McGrath	When Slocum leaves town for a villain convention, he leaves his dim-witted lackey Muley in charge of terrorizing Tumbleweed Valley.	Yippie-Yi-Yo (And Away We Go) (Paul Chrisman); I Ride an Old Paint	Gila Monster: Rock Concert
8	Trail Weevils	November 2, 1991				
9	Fool's Gold	November 9, 1991	George McGrath	The residents of Tumbleweed Valley start their own gold rush when Slocum finds a large nugget on the Harmony Ranch grounds.	Here Comes The Santa Fe (Douglas B. Green); At The End of The Rainbow Trail (Douglas B. Green)	The Adventures of Riders in the Sky: Riders in the Sky vs. Broadway Baby
10	Bad Brothers	November 16, 1991	Mark Curtis and Rod Ash	The notorious Bad Brothers send a letter to Riders in the Sky, warning the group of their release from prison and their impending arrival to Harmony Ranch to confront them.	Cowboy Jubilee (Fred LaBour, Paul Chrisman); Happy Trails (Dale Evans)	The Adventures of Riders in the Sky: Riders in the Sky vs. Crabby
11	Curse of the Mine	November 23, 1991				
12	The Contraption	November 30, 1991				
13	Mail Order Brides	December 7, 1991	George McGrath	Woody Paul mistakenly orders the Riders mail order brides instead of bridles.	Face: The Music (Fred LaBour); Jingle Jangle Jingle (Joseph J. Lilley, Frank Loesser)	Gila Monster: Principal's Office

== Home video releases ==
The series has never been officially released on any home media, either physical or digital, due to rights issues. This was revealed while answering a question for the "Youth Wants To Know" article on the Riders in the Sky website, with "Ranger Doug" Green stating that "far too many people have a little piece of that series to make a video viable".

== Awards ==
- Daytime Emmy for Outstanding Achievement in Costume Design (1992) – Won
