= The Birchmere =

Concert hall in Alexandria, Virginia

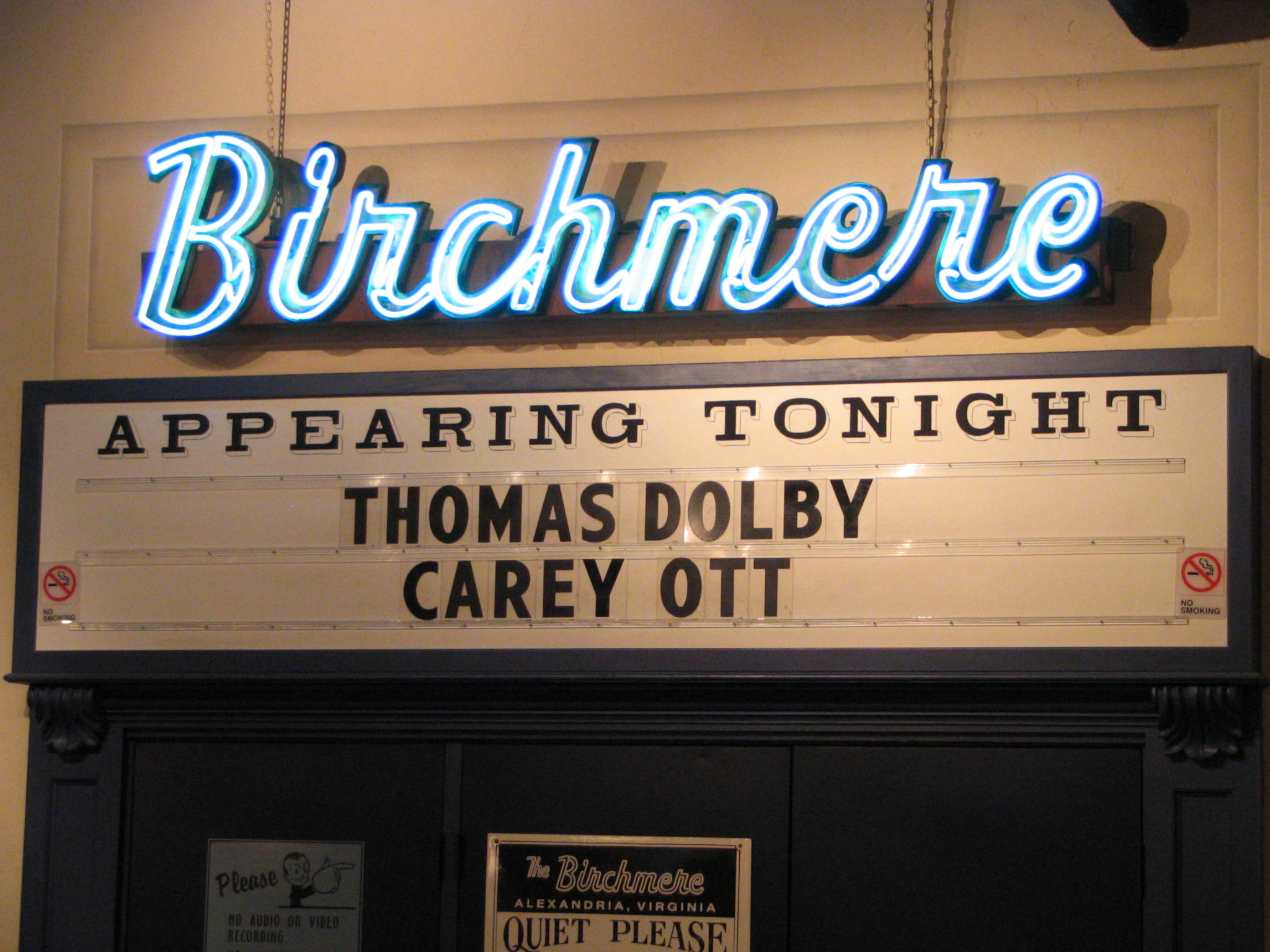
- The Birchmere marquee, advertising Thomas Dolby in 2006
- Interactive map of The Birchmere
- Address: 3701 Mt. Vernon Ave.
- Location: Alexandria, Virginia
- Coordinates: 38°50′25″N 77°3′41″W
- Owner: Gary Oelze
- Capacity: 500
- Type: concert hall

Construction
- Opened: April 4, 1966

Website
- www.birchmere.com

The Birchmere is a concert hall in Alexandria, Virginia, that features rock, blues, bluegrass, country, folk, jazz, ethnic, and comedic performers. Its main room seats 500 and provides dinner service, making for an intimate space, with tables only a few feet away from the stage. The location also features a bandstand with a bar and a dance floor. Owner and manager Gary Oelze opened The Birchmere in 1966 as a restaurant.

== History ==
The Birchmere opened its doors on April 4, 1966, as a restaurant. Music was added in 1975 with a concert space that held up to 200 people. Its original location was 2723 S. Wakefield St. in the Shirlington area of Arlington, Virginia, in a strip mall that was later razed. On May 14, 1981, the Birchmere reopened at its second location at 3901 Mt. Vernon Avenue in Alexandria, Virginia in a space that held at least 300 persons. In 1997, the club moved two blocks away to its current location at 3701 Mt. Vernon Avenue with seating for 500 customers.

An estimated 13,000 discrete performances have occurred at the music hall.

Over the years, Birchmere has attracted notable customers to include members of the media, Supreme Court justices and Presidents.

“Bill Clinton came here twice,” Oelze said. “Al Gore used to live up the street and was here all the time. One night he was leaving the White House. Clinton said, ‘Where you going?’ He said, ‘I’m going to The Birchmere to hear Jerry Jeff Walker.’ He said, ‘Hillary and I will go with you.’ The four of them showed up, then they came back to see Kim Richey.”

On November 10, 2021, the illustrated history of the Birchmere was published: All Roads Lead to the Birchmere: America's Legendary Music Hall by Founder/operator Gary Oelze and music writer, Stephen Moore.

On January 23, 2023, Birchmere owner Gary Oelze died from natural causes at 80.

== Plan for expansion ==
During the redevelopment of downtown Silver Spring, Maryland, a plan was developed to build a second Birchmere site, slated to be an $8 million, 800-seat venue. After years of negotiations, the deal was rejected on July 25, 2007. At the time, Birchmere management claimed that Montgomery County officials breached a contractual agreement with the music venue, but these claims were disputed by the developers and government officials who denied any contractual obligation for development.

== Recordings ==
- The Johnson Mountain Boys recorded their Live at the Birchmere album on April 5, 1983.
- The Four Bitchin' Babes recorded two of their live albums, Buy Me, Bring Me, Take Me, Don't Mess My Hair in 1990 and Gabby Road in 1997, at the Birchmere.
- Riders in the Sky also recorded their live album there.
- Dave Matthews Band recorded songs from their album Recently at the Birchmere on February 21, 1994.
