= Always Drink Upstream from the Herd =

Studio album by Riders in the Sky
- Released: October 31, 1995
- Genre: Western swing
- Length: 35:11
- Label: Rounder

Riders in the Sky chronology
Cowboys in Love (1994)	Always Drink Upstream from the Herd (1995)	Cowboy Songs (1996)

Professional ratings
Review scores
Source	Rating
Allmusic	4/5 stars

Always Drink Upstream from the Herd is a studio recording by the Western band Riders in the Sky, released in 1995.

The album's title comes from the line with which the quartet regularly closes its concerts; the advice is a warning that the herd of livestock using the same stream may also relieve themselves in said stream.

== Liner notes ==
"Performing with an abiding love and respect for the western past, Riders in the Sky have fun with the tradition, but never make fun of it. Even better, they have become part of the tradition that they so lovingly preserve. When you see or hear Riders in the Sky, you do not step back into a period piece or a recreated segment of history. You will always hear them pay tribute to the Western musical greats of the past, with songs like "Cool Water" and "Cattle Call," but you will also hear them do their own compositions, like "Desert Serenade," which fittingly take their place alongside the classics. Riders in the Sky are more than revivalists; they have made the music vital by putting their own personal stamp on a distinct tradition of American music. It is a delight to see them return to the Rounder label with a collection of songs that beautifully display the range of their talents and the diversity of their repertoire." — Bill C. Malone (from his liner notes)

== Awards ==
Winner of the Wrangler Award for Outstanding Traditional Album of 1995.

== Track listing ==
1. "Riding the Winds of the West" (Douglas Green) – 2:12
2. "The Texas Polka" (Oakley Halderman, Vic Knight, Lew Porter) – 2:07
3. "(Take Me Back to My) Boots and Saddle" (Teddy Powell, Walter Samuels, Leonard Whitcup) – 4:18
4. "After You've Gone" (Henry Creamer, Turner Layton) – 3:22
5. "The Trail Tip Song" (Too Slim) – 2:58
6. "Desert Serenade" (Green) – 2:58
7. "Rawhide" (Dimitri Tiomkin, Ned Washington) – 2:07
8. "The Whispering Wind" (Green) – 4:01
9. "The First Cowboy Song" (Green, McMahan) – 2:42
10. "Idaho" (Basso) – 2:57
11. "The Running Gun" (Jim Glaser, Tompal Glaser) – 2:41
12. "Cattle Call" (Tex Owens) – 2:48

== Personnel ==
- Douglas B. Green (a.k.a. Ranger Doug) – vocals, guitar
- Paul Crisman (a.k.a. Woody Paul) – vocals, fiddle
- Fred LaBour (a.k.a. Too Slim) – vocals, bass
