= A Pair of Kings =

A Pair of Kings may refer to:

- A Pair of Kings (album), a 2002 album by Riders in the Sky
- A Pair of Kings (film), a 1922 American silent comedy film

== See also ==
- Pair of Kings, an American television sitcom
