= Betty Willis =

Betty Willis may refer to:

- Betty Willis (artist) (1923–2015), American artist and graphic designer
- Betty Willis (singer) (1941–2018), American soul singer
