= Public Cowboy =

Public Cowboy may refer to:

== Public Cowboy #1 ==
- Public Cowboy No. 1, a 1937 Western film with Gene Autry
- Public Cowboy No. 1 (album), a 1996 album by Western band Riders in the Sky

== See also ==
- Gene Autry
