= Act Naturally =

1963 single by Buck Owens and the Buckaroos

Single by Buck Owens and the Buckaroos
- B-side: "Over and Over Again"
- Released: March 11, 1963
- Recorded: February 12, 1963
- Studio: Capitol, Hollywood, California
- Genre: Country
- Length: 2:19
- Label: Capitol
- Songwriters: Johnny Russell, Lavonia Inez Morrison ("Voni Morrison")
- Producer: Ken Nelson

Buck Owens and the Buckaroos singles chronology
"You're for Me" (1962)	"Act Naturally" (1963)	"Love's Gonna Live Here" (1963)

"Act Naturally" is a song written by Johnny Russell, with a writing credit given to Voni Morrison and publishing rights transferred to Buck Owens. It was originally recorded by Buck Owens and the Buckaroos, whose version reached number one on the Billboard Country Singles chart in 1963, his first chart-topper. The song tells the tale of someone who has been jilted and, because of that, can play a film part of someone sad and lonely without knowing anything about acting. It has been recorded by many other artists, including Loretta Lynn, Dwight Yoakam, the cast of Kidsongs, and Mrs. Miller, though the best-known cover version is by the Beatles in 1965. Featuring Ringo Starr taking lead vocal, it became a featured performance number of his in concert, both with the Beatles and later with His All-Starr Band. Owens and Starr went on to record a duet version in 1989. The song was also covered by Betty Willis in 1978, and by Riders in the Sky in 2000 for the album Woody's Roundup: A Rootin' Tootin' Collection of Woody's Favorite Songs.

== Origin ==
Russell, originally from Mississippi, was based in Fresno, California, in the early 1960s. One night, some of his friends from Oklahoma planned to do a recording session in Los Angeles and asked him to join them. In order to do so, Russell had to break a date with his then-girlfriend. "When she asked me why I was going to L.A., I answered 'They are going to put me in the movies and make a big star out of me.' We both laughed."

Thus inspired, Russell quickly came up with a concept for a love song based around his comment. He wrote it that day, and tried to teach it to the singer he was helping in Los Angeles, but he was unable to learn it. Russell then wanted to record it himself, but his then-producer turned it down, claiming that songs about the movies were not hit material.

A full two years passed before anyone recorded "Act Naturally". "No matter how hard I tried, I couldn't get anyone interested in it," Russell said.

== Buck Owens and the Buckaroos version ==
By 1963, Russell was writing with a woman named Voni Morrison, who also worked with a Bakersfield, California-based singer named Buck Owens. After Russell played "Act Naturally" for Morrison, she thought it would be a natural for Owens, and she told Russell that she could get him to record it. Because no one had yet recorded it, and Russell had an agreement with Morrison to share songwriting credits, he gave her partial credit, though her only role in the song was submitting it to Owens.

Owens did not like "Act Naturally" at first. But Buckaroo band leader Don Rich heard Russell's demo version and liked it, and eventually, the song grew on Owens. One night, Russell got a phone call from Owens asking if he could record the song, and he said yes. "I later found out that he had already recorded the song that day and just wanted the publishing rights," Russell said. "I was more than pleased to give him the rights in order to get the song recorded."

Owens recorded "Act Naturally" at the Capitol Studios in Hollywood on February 12, 1963, and the song was released on March 11 as a non-album single. It entered the Billboard country charts on April 13, 1963. On June 15, it spent the first of four non-consecutive weeks at number one. In all, it spent 28 weeks on the country charts. The song helped to make him a superstar; before the 1960s were over, Owens had placed 19 singles atop the Billboard country charts. The song also helped establish Russell as a songwriter, and in the 1970s he was modestly successful as a singer as well.

=== Chart performance ===
Chart (1963)	Peak position
U.S. Billboard Hot Country Singles	1

== The Beatles version ==
"Act Naturally"
- US picture sleeve (reverse)

Single by the Beatles
- A-side: "Yesterday"
- Released: August 6, 1965 (UK Help! album); September 13, 1965 (US single)
- Recorded: June 17, 1965
- Studio: EMI, London
- Genre: Country
- Length: 2:29
- Label: Capitol (US); Parlophone (UK)
- Songwriter: Johnny Russell
- Producer: George Martin

The Beatles US singles chronology
"Help!" (1965)	"Yesterday" / "Act Naturally" (1965)	"We Can Work It Out" / "Day Tripper" (1965)

The Beatles recorded the song in 1965 for the United Kingdom version of their album Help!, with drummer Ringo Starr on vocals – his fifth with the band. It was released as the B-side of "Yesterday" in the United States. Stephen Thomas Erlewine of Allmusic called it "an ideal showcase for Ringo's amiable vocals."

=== Recording ===
Recorded on June 17, 1965, in 13 takes. The first 12 were evidently used to work out the arrangement; the master was take 13, the only one with vocals. It was mixed the following day. The Beatles almost recorded a song by their engineer Norman Smith, but realized that Starr did not yet have a vocal on Help! They originally recorded the song "If You've Got Trouble" earlier in 1965 as Starr's intended song for the album, but were dissatisfied with the results and recorded "Act Naturally" to replace it. It was the last cover they recorded until the Get Back/Let It Be sessions in 1969.

=== Releases ===
Because Capitol Records' version of the Help! album in the United States included only the songs that appeared in the film Help!, plus incidental music from the film, the label held back "Yesterday" and "Act Naturally" and issued them as a non-LP single. As the B-side of the U.S. single, "Act Naturally" peaked at number 47 in October 1965. The two songs made their first US album appearance on Yesterday and Today, released in the U.S. on June 20, 1966.

When the single was reissued on Apple Records in 1971, "Act Naturally" had the "full apple" side and "Yesterday" ended up on the "sliced apple" side. That is because "Act Naturally" was the intended A-side and has always been listed as such in Capitol's files.

=== Performances ===
The Beatles performed the song during an appearance on The Ed Sullivan Show which was taped on August 14, 1965, and broadcast on September 12, 1965. It was also performed at the Beatles' famous Shea Stadium concert on August 15, 1965, and played at some concerts throughout The Beatles' 1965 US tour (alternating with Starr's other song, "I Wanna Be Your Man").

The song is closely identified with Starr and he has performed it on every tour iteration, and virtually every show, of Ringo Starr & His All-Starr Band, beginning in 1989.

=== Personnel ===
According to author John C. Winn:

- Ringo Starr – lead vocal, drums, sticks
- Paul McCartney – harmony vocal, bass
- John Lennon – acoustic, rhythm guitar
- George Harrison – double-tracked lead guitar

=== Charts ===
Chart performance for "Act Naturally"
Chart (1965)	Peak position
US Billboard Hot 100	47

== Buck Owens and Ringo Starr duet version ==
"Act Naturally"

Single by Buck Owens and Ringo Starr

from the album Act Naturally
- B-side: "The Key's In The Mailbox"
- Released: July 29, 1989
- Recorded: March 27, 1989
- Genre: Country
- Length: 2:59
- Label: Capitol
- Songwriters: Harlan Howard, Johnny Russell, Voni Morrison

Buck Owens singles chronology
"Put a Quarter in the Jukebox" (1989)	"Act Naturally" (1989)	"Gonna Have Love (re-recording)" (1989)

Ringo Starr singles chronology
"In My Car" (1983)	"Act Naturally" (1989)	"It Don't Come Easy (live)" (1990)

Twenty-four years after the Beatles released their famous cover version of "Act Naturally", Owens and Ringo Starr teamed up for a duet remake. The session was produced by Jerry Crutchfield and Jim Shaw. A music video was filmed for the song depicting the duo playing bumbling versions of themselves acting as cowboys on a western movie set. The video was directed by George Bloom, and produced by Ken Brown. Released on Capitol Records (B-44409), on July 29, 1989, the duet peaked at number 27 and spent 11 weeks on the Billboard country chart in the summer of 1989. It was Owens' last top 40 single on the chart. The B-side was Owens playing Harlan Howard's "The Key's in the Mailbox".

The song also marked Starr's only showing on the country singles chart. It was not the first time a member of the Beatles had appeared on the country charts: Paul McCartney had done so with Wings in 1974–75 with "Sally G".

The recording was nominated for the 1989 Country Music Association Vocal Event of the Year and a 1990 Grammy for Best Country Vocal Collaboration, but lost both times to "There's a Tear in My Beer," recorded by Hank Williams Sr. and Hank Williams Jr.

=== Chart performance ===
Chart (1989)	Peak position
Canada Country Singles (RPM)	50
US Hot Country Songs (Billboard)	27
