= The Western Way =

Western music and culture trade magazine

The Western Way is a Western music trade magazine.

It is published quarterly in Coppell, Texas, by the Western Music Association.

== History and profile ==
The Western Way features articles about current Western music, musicians, musical groups, and cowboy poetry, as well as historical articles. It also covers professional training and self-help subjects. In addition, each issue contains listings of Western music festivals, playlists of Western music currently played by radio stations, and reviews of trade related CDs and books.

In the 2010s Don Cusic was the editor of the magazine.
