= The Old Double Diamond =

Western song by Gary McMahan

"The Old Double Diamond" is a Western song written by Gary McMahan. It has been recorded by Chris LeDoux, Ian Tyson, and dozens of other artists.

== Background ==
The song is about the (real) public auction of a ranch near Dubois, Wyoming. The Double Diamond was one of the last parcels of the huge Mill Iron Ranch, which included holdings from Montana to New Mexico. It was known in former times as a place on a wilderness journey where a cowboy could get his horse shod and get a good hot meal. The ranch was originally homesteaded in 1898, and operated as a cattle ranch by many owners over the years. The auction was held in 1975.

The former Double Diamond is located ten miles east of Dubois, in the valley of the East Fork of the Wind River. Jackson, Wyoming is about 85 miles to the west. The ranch is regionally well-known, and illustrated descriptions of it are available online.

The song was written when McMahan was on a fishing trip with his father. They heard about the auction and decided to attend it. McMahon said "There were several cowboys there who worked for the Double Diamond. They were runnin’ the stock through the sale pen – horses and cattle – and generally helping with the sale. When they got done, they were paid off and all of them lost their jobs. They loaded their duffle and saddles into the back of an old pickup truck and set off to find them another ranchin’ job. It broke my heart to see the old West getting sectioned off, sold to the highest bidder, and dying out. Judging from the success of the song, I guess it touched a lot of other people, too." He wrote the song on the way back to Colorado.

== Reception ==
The song has been called a modern-day classic, and is said to be known by just about everyone who's worked on a ranch. Michael Martin Murphey has called it the "Mr. Bojangles" of cowboy music. Members of the Western Writers of America chose it as one of the Top 100 Western songs of all time. In 2009, it was cited as one of today's top thirteen cowboy songs by Western Horseman magazine.
