= Betty Willis (singer) =

- Born: Betty Jane Willis; March 10, 1941; Mississippi, United States
- Origin: Santa Ana, California
- Died: January 1, 2018 (aged 76) Santa Ana, California
- Genres: Soul music, rhythm and blues
- Occupations: Singer, postal worker

Betty Jane Willis (March 10, 1941 – January 1, 2018) was an American soul singer in the 1960s.

== Biography ==
Born on a farm in Mississippi, Willis moved with her family to Fresno, California, when she was two. In the early 1960s, she moved to Santa Ana and sang in Los Angeles-area nightclubs. Singer Bill Medley, whose career with The Righteous Brothers was just beginning, was told about Willis. Medley and Willis recorded a song together at Gold Star Studios, but it was never released. However, her voice and association with the studio drew notice from producers Phil Spector and Leon Russell, who retooled the country song "Act Naturally" into a rhythm and blues version for Willis in 1965. As part of the duo Betty and Ray, with Ray Lockhart, she also made several other recordings. Her last known recording was in 1968.

According to her daughter, Willis enjoyed a singing career but did not want to be part of the music industry. She also grew frustrated when paperwork was mishandled that scuttled an Africa music tour. She briefly worked in a factory before becoming a postal worker in the 1980s and retired after 37 years.

== Personal life ==
Despite having family in Santa Ana, Willis chose to mostly live on the street in retirement. She slept outside a fabric shop, arriving after the shop closed and leaving before it opened.

== Death ==
Early on January 1, 2018, Willis was assaulted by Rosendo Xo Pec, a homeless man who attempted to rape her. She was hit repeatedly on the head and strangled to death, before police arrived to apprehend her attacker. Willis was 76.

On August 31, 2022, 56 months after the murder of Betty Willis, Los Angeles Magazine published a lengthy feature on the apparent lack of justice in the Willis case. The main focus of the article was that more than four and a half years have passed since the man charged with her rape and murder was taken into custody. The piece points out that, as of summer 2022, the suspect in the January 2018 murder has yet to be prosecuted for the alleged killing of Willis.

The perpetrator was eventually found guilty and sentenced to a term of life without parole on September 29, 2023.
