= Silver Jubilee (Sex Pistols album) =

Compilation album by Sex Pistols
- Released: 2002
- Genre: Punk rock
- Label: Castle Records

Silver Jubilee is a compilation album by the Sex Pistols released in 2002. The album brings together eight demo recordings with four live tracks.

== Track listing ==
1. God Save the Queen
2. Anarchy in the UK
3. Pretty Vacant
4. Problems
5. Seventeen
6. EMI
7. Liar
8. Submission
9. I Wanna Be Me (Live)
10. No Feelings (Live)
11. No Fun (Live)
12. I'm a Lazy Sod (Live)
