= Stanley's Dinosaur Round-Up =

- DVD cover
- Written by: Sherri Stoner
- Directed by: Jeff Buckland
- Starring: Jessica D. Stone; Charles Shaughnessy; Khylan Jones; David Landsberg; Ari Meyers; Hynden Walch; John Ritter; Randy Quaid
- Music by: Stuart Kollmorgen
- Country of origin: United States
- Original language: English

Production
- Producer: Melanie Grisanti
- Running time: 71 minutes
- Production company: Cartoon Pizza

Original release
- Release: June 23, 2005

Stanley's Dinosaur Round-Up is a 2005 American animated Western television film based on the Playhouse Disney television series Stanley. It was directed by Jeff Buckland and produced by Cartoon Pizza. The film is notable for being the final film role of actor John Ritter, the voice of Great Uncle Stew, who died in September 2003 and was also dedicated to his memory.

== Plot ==
Stanley goes with his family and friends to visit the ranch of Great Uncle Stew. The local land baron is trying to buy the ranch and make it a parking lot for his nearby amusement park. The only way Uncle Stew thinks he can get any money to save his ranch is to find other dinosaur bones to attract customers. Stanley and his friends help in the search.

== Voice cast ==
- Jessica D. Stone as Stanley
- Charles Shaughnessy as Dennis
- Khylan Jones as Mimi and Marci
- David Landsberg as Mark Griff
- Ari Meyers as Joyce Griff
- Rene Mujica as Harry
- Shawn Pyfrom as Lionel
- Philece Sampler as Lester
- Hynden Walch as Elsie
- Hillary B. Smith as Paleontologist
- John Ritter as Great Uncle Stew
- Randy Quaid as Rockin' Rory
- Riders in the Sky as themselves
