= Riders in the Sky (band) =

American Western music and comedy group

- Riders in the Sky appearing at the Ponca Theatre in Ponca City, Oklahoma on September 29, 2007 at a concert commemorating the 100th anniversary of the birth of Gene Autry. From left to right are Joey the Cow Polka King, Woody Paul, Ranger Doug and Too Slim.

Background information
- Origin: Nashville, TN
- Genres: Western swing; children's; country; cowboy music
- Years active: 1977–present
- Labels: Rounder, MCA, CBS, Epic, Walt Disney, Rykodisc
- Members: Douglas B. Green; Woody Paul; Fred LaBour; Joey Miskulin
- Past members: "Windy Bill" Collins; Tumbleweed Tommy
- Website: www.ridersinthesky.com

Riders in the Sky is an American Western music and comedy group, which began performing in 1977. The band has released more than 40 albums, starred in a single-season, self-titled television series on CBS, wrote and starred in an NPR syndicated radio drama Riders Radio Theater, and appeared in television series and films, including as featured contributors to Ken Burns' Country Music. Their family-friendly style also appeals to children, exemplified in their recordings for Disney and Pixar. They have won two Grammy Awards and have written and performed music for major motion pictures, including "Woody's Roundup" from Toy Story 2 and Pixar's short film, For the Birds. The band also recorded companion albums for Toy Story 2 and Monsters, Inc.

== History ==
=== Early years (1977–1979) ===
The Riders first performed on November 11, 1977 at Herr Harry's Frank N' Steins in Nashville, Tennessee. For this first performance, the Riders consisted of Deputy Doug (Douglas B. Green), Windy Bill Collins, and Fred LaBour. Happy with the crowd's reaction, the Riders performed for the second time at Herr Harry's the next evening. Between the second and third performances, the band still did not have a name, but that changed in December 1977, when Fred LaBour found a copy of The Sons of The Pioneers album Riders in the Sky. When LaBour saw the album, he immediately called Green and told him, "Riders in the Sky" should be the band's name. Green agreed and from their third performance on, they were officially billed as Riders in the Sky. In 1978, Bill Collins left the Riders shortly after "Tumbleweed Tommy" Goldsmith joined. Shortly after Collins left, "Woody Paul" Chrisman also joined the band. In mid-1979, Tommy Goldsmith left the Riders shortly before the recording of their first album, which became Three on the Trail. Goldsmith performed on the Riders' second album, Cowboy Jubilee, in 1980, but not as a member of the band.

=== Rise in popularity (1980–1989) ===
==== Induction into the Grand Ole Opry (1982) ====
In 1982, Doug Green wrote a letter to Hal Durham, manager of the Grand Ole Opry, telling him the Riders would like to join. Durham responded favorably; Western music was under-represented in the Opry, and it would not conflict with the other materials and performances already in the Opry. After 26 appearances as a guest act, the Riders were officially inducted into the Opry on June 19, 1982.

==== Tumbleweed Theater (1983–1988) ====
In late 1982, the Riders were approached by Steve Arwood and Randy Hale to host a television show on the Nashville Network (which had not begun broadcasting yet) called Tumbleweed Theater. The premise of the show was that their 90-minute program would show heavily edited public domain "B-Westerns" of the 1930s and '40s with Riders in the Sky performing skits and songs before, in between, and after the films. After screening the movie that would be featured in the episode, Arwood and Fred LaBour wrote the sketches that played between the films, with many of the skits carrying over to the Riders' live shows and albums. Tumbleweed Theater premiered March 12, 1983, and continued for five seasons overall, the last two consisting of repackaged skits and songs.

==== Sweet Dreams and Wild Horses (1985) ====
In 1985, the Riders made their Hollywood debut when the trio landed parts in Sweet Dreams, a biographical film about the life of Patsy Cline. The band played the Jordanaires, although in the film they are never mentioned by name. After filming their part for Sweet Dreams, the Riders appeared as themselves in the made-for-television Kenny Rogers movie Wild Horses, where they performed their original compositions "Here Comes the Santa Fe" and "Blue Bonnet Lady" during a party scene.

==== Riders Radio Theater (1988–1995) ====
Beginning in 1988, Riders in the Sky were the stars of Riders Radio Theater, a weekly radio show written by Fred LaBour and Steve Arwood (now going by the stage name Texas Bix Bender) that was essentially the Tumbleweed Theater television show minus the B-Western films. The half-hour show was taped at the Tennessee Performing Arts Center in Nashville for the first year of episodes, but later moved to Cincinnati, Ohio, beginning in 1989. The weekly show was canceled in 1995, but later came back as occasional specials beginning in 1998.

=== 1990–present ===
==== CBS Children's show (1991) ====
In 1990, CBS approached the Riders to do a Saturday-morning television show that would later be described as "Pee-Wee's Playhouse meets the Wild West". Only airing for one season (13 episodes) due to low ratings and weekly schedule changes, the show was written by George McGrath instead of the Riders themselves. Fred LaBour reflected on the show, saying, "Everything we've had a hand in writing had been a success, we didn't have a hand in that, and it wasn't." The show premiered on September 14, 1991, as Riders in the Sky (although it has also been referred to as Saturday Mornings with Riders in the Sky).

==== Toy Story 2 and Grammys (1998–2002) ====
In 1998, Ash Brannon recommended to Disney and Pixar executives that Riders in the Sky be the performers of "Woody's Round-Up" for their upcoming film Toy Story 2. The executives were so impressed with the Riders' performance, they had the Riders create a tie-in album around the characters of Toy Story 2 called Woody's Roundup: A Rootin' Tootin' Collection of Woody's Favorite Songs. The album won the Grammy Award for Best Musical Album for Children at the Grammy Awards of 2001.

After the success of the Woody's Round-Up album, the Riders were called back into Pixar in 2002 to do another tie-in album, except based on Pixar's latest film: Monsters, Inc. The album, titled Monsters, Inc. Scream Factory Favorites, won the Riders a second Grammy Award for Best Musical Album for Children at the Grammy Awards of 2003. In addition, the Riders wrote and performed the score of "For the Birds", an animated short that showed before "Monsters, Inc." in theaters. It won the Academy Award for Best Animated Short Film in 2001.

==== In animated form (2003–2015) ====
The Riders made their animated debut in 2003, in the Warner Bros. animated series Duck Dodgers, where they played a robot band modeled after themselves. Their second animated appearance was in Disney's direct-to-DVD animated adventure children's film titled Stanley's Dinosaur Round-Up. Their most recent animated role was in the Kickstarter-funded film Cartoon Cowboys by WonderVista Studios. Cartoon Cowboys borrows heavily from Riders Radio Theater, including characters from the show and the Riders having the same personalities as their radio counterparts.

==== YellaWood spokesmen (2009) ====
The Riders appeared as musical spokesmen in a series of YellaWood commercials, which reunited them with Steve Arwood (once again playing Texas Bix Bender) and featured a set similar to the one seen on Tumbleweed Theater (complete with a blue Studebaker pickup truck and the Riders performing on a bunkhouse porch). The Riders also performed the theme song for YellaWood's The Adventures of Yella Fella and made cameos in the first episodes of seasons one and two.

==== Hiatus (2019–2021) ====
The Riders in the Sky went on an extended hiatus during the COVID-19 pandemic in 2020, in part because of Miskulin having extended health issues that prevented him from playing. The remaining members declined to make any of their usual Opry appearances during the pandemic; only Ranger Doug continued with any cowboy-related projects during the hiatus. The band resumed performing in 2021. As of 2026, they continue perform on the Grand Ole Opry several times per month, and greatly scaled back on touring dates outside of Tennessee.

== Members ==
=== Current ===
- "Ranger Doug" Green – vocals, guitar (1977–present)
- Too Slim (Fred LaBour) – vocals, double bass (1977–present)
- "Woody Paul" Chrisman – vocals, fiddle (1978–present; retired from touring and Grand Ole Opry performances in late 2025 but still a member of the group)
- Joey Miskulin, the Cow-Polka King – vocals, accordion (1999–present; started performing with the Riders in 1988, but did not become an official member until 1999; continues touring with the group, but does not appear in regular Grand Ole Opry performances since early 2020s)

=== Former ===
- "Windy Bill" Collins – vocals, guitar (1977–1978)
- "Tumbleweed Tommy" Goldsmith – vocals, guitar (1978–1979)
- Jody Chalk – guitar (1979 "Texas tour")
- Mark Abbott – bass (2018 tour)

=== Fill-In Members ===
- "Gentleman Jeff" Taylor – accordion (since mid-2000s; taken over Joey Miskulin's role during Grand Ole Opry performances and occasional touring dates since late 2010s)
- Jimmy Capps – guitar (early-2010s-2019; fill-in during performances in which Ranger Doug was absent)
- "Jack Rabbit Justin" Branum – fiddle (2025-present; replaced Woody Paul for touring dates and regular Grand Ole Opry performances)

== Awards ==
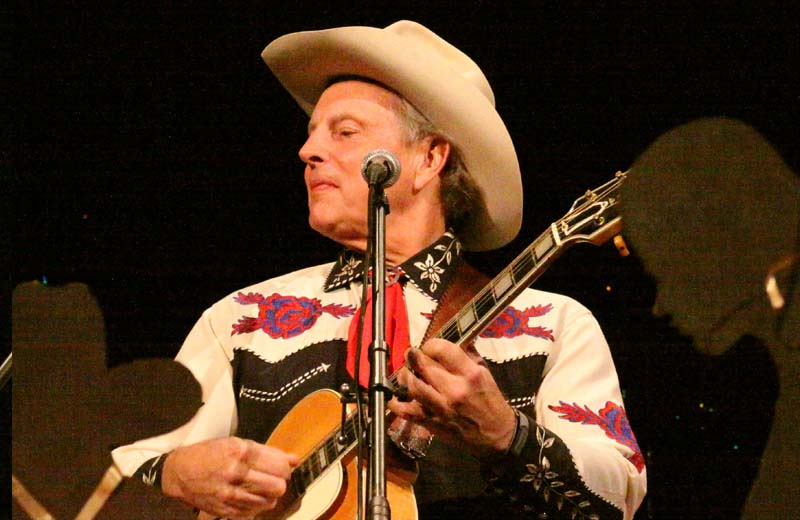
Ranger Doug (Douglas B. Green) performs at the Poncan Theatre in Ponca City, Oklahoma on November 7, 2008

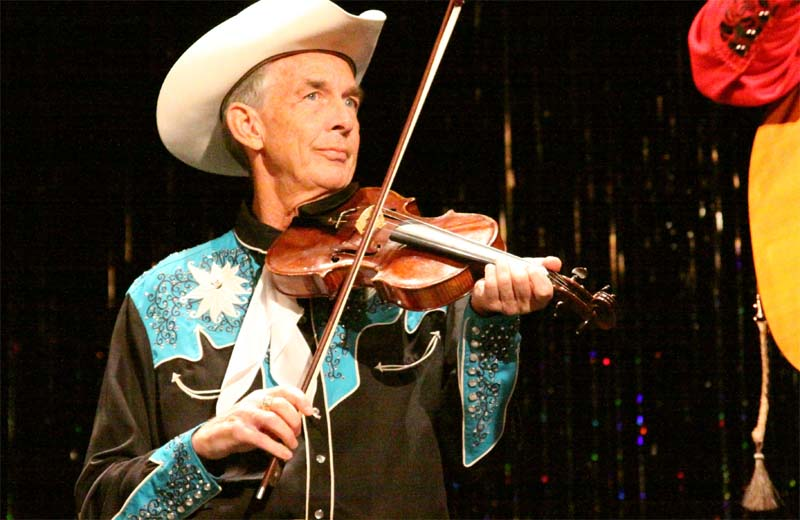
Woody Paul (Paul Woodrow Chrisman)

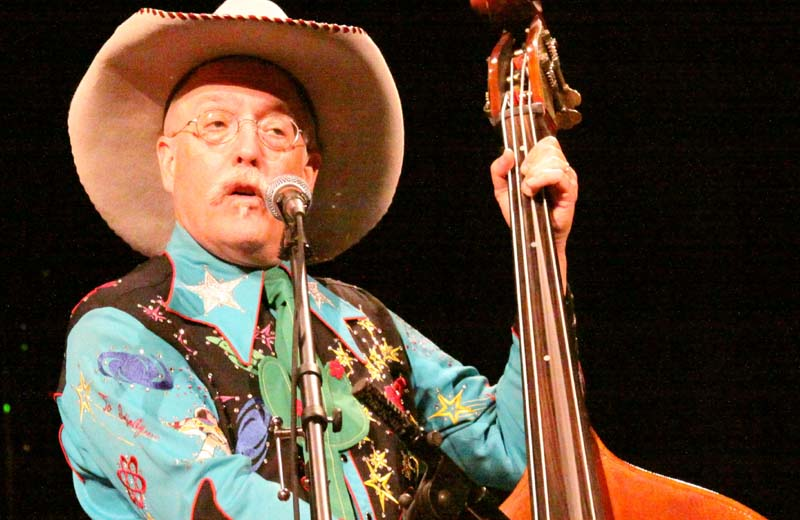
Too Slim (Fred LaBour)

Joey the Cowpolka King (Joey Miskulin)

Riders in the Sky were named Western Music Group of the Year during the Academy of Western Artists 2006 Will Rogers Awards.

- Cowboy Jubilee
  - This album was featured on The New York Times' Best Ten List for 1982.
  - Best Independent Country Album of the Year
- Saddle Pals
  - Best Independent Children's Album of the Year
- Always Drink Upstream from the Herd
  - 1995 Cowboy Hall of Fame Wrangler Award for Outstanding Western Recording!
- Woody's Roundup: A Rootin' Tootin' Collection of Woody's Favorite Songs
  - 2001 Grammy Award Winner: "Best Musical Album For Children"
- Monsters, Inc. Scream Factory Favorites
  - 2003 Grammy Award Winner: "Best Musical Album For Children"

== Discography ==
Title	Type	Release date	Label
Three on the Trail	studio	1979	Rounder Records
Cowboy Jubilee	studio	1981	Rounder Records
Prairie Serenade	studio	1982	Rounder Records
Weeds & Water	studio	1983	Rounder Records
Riders in the Sky, Live	live	1984	Rounder Records
Saddle Pals	studio	1985	Rounder Records
New Trails	studio	1986	Rounder Records
Best of the West (album)	best of	1987	Rounder Records
Best of the West Rides Again	best of	October 25, 1990	Rounder Records
The Cowboy Way (album)	live	1987	MCA
Riders Radio Theater (album)	studio	June 27, 1988	MCA
Riders go Commercial	studio	June 19, 1989	MCA
Horse Opera	studio	1990	MCA
Harmony Ranch	studio	1991	CBS
Merry Christmas from Harmony Ranch	studio	1992	CBS
Saturday Morning with Riders	best of	1992	MCA
Cowboys in Love	studio	1994	Epic Records
Always Drink Upstream from the Herd	studio	October 31, 1995	Rounder Records
Cowboy Songs	best of	20 August 1996	Rounder Records
Public Cowboy #1: The Music of Gene Autry	tribute	October 20, 1996	Rounder Records
Yodel the Cowboy Way	best of	1998	Rounder Records
A Great Big Western Howdy!	studio	July 14, 1998	Rounder Records
Christmas the Cowboy Way	studio	October 5, 1999	Rounder Records
Woody's Roundup: A Rootin' Tootin' Collection of Woody's Favorite Songs	studio	August 29, 2000	Disney
A Pair of Kings	studio	February 19, 2002	Oh Boy Records
Ridin' the Tweetsie Railroad	studio	2002	Self Released
Monsters, Inc. Scream Factory Favorites	studio	August 27, 2002	Disney
Silver Jubilee	studio	2003	Acoustic Disc
Riders in the Sky Present: Davy Crockett, King of the Wild Frontier	studio	August 3, 2004	Rounder Records
Riders in the Sky Live from the Golden Age of Riders Radio Theater	studio	2006	Riders Radio Records
Riders in the Sky "Lassoed Live" at the Schermerhorn with the Nashville Symphony	live	2009	Nashville Symphony
The Land Beyond The Sun	studio	2011	Riders Radio Records
America's Favorite Cowboy Songs	studio	2012	Cracker Barrel
Home On The Range (with Wilford Brimley)	studio	2013	Riders Radio Records
Daytrotter Sessions: Riders In The Sky	studio	2013	Daytrotter
Riders in the Sky Salute Roy Rogers: King of the Cowboys	studio	2016	Riders Radio Records/Too Slims Mercantile
Songs of the Frontier (as Ranger Doug "with a lot of help from Riders in the Sky")	studio	2018	Rural Rhythm
Throw A Saddle On A Star	studio	2023	Riders Radio Records
Riders In The Sky At Larry's Country Diner	live	2024	Country Family Reunion

=== Album collaborations with other artists ===
Artist	Album	Year	Songs	Notes
Larry Mahan	(unreleased)	1979	"Saying Goodbye to the West"; "The Old Double Diamond"; "Nashville Cowboy"	Album was never completed/released.
John McEuen	(unreleased)	1980/1981	"I've Been Down That Road Before"; "I Am a Pilgrim"	Album was never completed/released.
Al Dressen	(unreleased)	1985	"Down on The Rio Grande"; "We're Glad to See You"	Album was never completed/released.
Gail Chazen	(unreleased)	1987	"High and Dry"	Album was never completed/released.
Kathy Mattea	Willow in the Wind	1989	"Here's Hopin"	
Roy Rogers	Tribute	1991		Riders in the Sky performed as the musicians on all tracks of the album.
Roy Rogers	(unreleased)	1994	"Whoopie Ti Yi Yo"; "Home on the Range"; "I Ride an Old Paint"; "The Yellow Rose of Texas"; "Streets of Laredo"; "The Old Chisholm Trail"; "Happy Trails"; "The Buckaroo's Life"; "Night-Riding Song"	Album was never commercially released due to the closure of Rabbit Ears Productions.
Michael Martin Murphey	Cowboy Christmas: Cowboy Songs II	1991	"Riding Home on Christmas Eve"; "Christmas Yodel"; "Good Night Ladies"/"Auld Lang Syne"	
Asleep at the Wheel	Tribute to the Music of Bob Wills and the Texas Playboys	1993	"Dusty Skies"	
Stonewall Jackson	Stonewall Jackson And Super Friends: A Tribute	2002	"Old Showboat"	Recorded in 1994 but not released until 2002.
Stephanie Davis	River of No Return	1996	"Salt River Valley"; "River of No Return"; Prairie Lullaby"	The Riders also recorded "Montana" (Lou Forbes, Bob Nolan) for the album, but it was ultimately cut from the final release.
Stu Phillips	Blue Canadian Rockies	1996	"Colorado"; "Blue Canadian Rockies"; "Rangeland"	
Frankie Yankovic	Songs Of The Polka King Volume 1	1996	"Hoop-Dee-Doo"	
Luke Reed	Corridos: Story Songs of the West	2000	"Blue Mesa"; "If There Wasn't Any Cows"	
Cathy Fink & Marcy Marxer	Dancin' in the Kitchen	2015	"I'm My Own Grandpa"; "Birthday Pup"	
Moe Bandy	Lucky Me	2016	"Long Lived the Cowboy"; "That Horse That You Can't Ride"	
Various Artist	Home on the Range (Ken Spurgeon film) Soundtrack	2017	"Home on the Range IV"	
Cathy Fink & Marcy Marxer	Zoom a Little Zoom: A Ride Through Science	2018	"Why Does the Sun Shine?"	
Cheryl Deserée	Dreamy	2018	"Home to Stay"	
Bernadette	Wings of Transformation	2019	"Irish Lullaby"	
Phoebe White	UnXpected	2022	"Phoebe the Yodeling Cowgirl"; "Whatever Happened to the Yodeling Cowgirl?"; "I Want to Be a Cowboy's Sweetheart"	
Phoebe White	Cowgirl's Delight	2024	"Ride Along With Me"; "Swingin' in the Saddle"	
Jesse and Noah	The Sunshine Shop	2026	"Old Cowboys"	

== Notable filmography ==
Year	Film	Role	Notes
1982	Twilight Theater	Guest Performers	Performer: "That's How The Yodel Was Born" Miscredited as: "The Rider's In The Sky"
1983–1988	Tumbleweed Theater	Themselves/Various Characters	TV series
1985	Sweet Dreams	The Jordanaires	Credited as "Opry Band"
1985	Wild Horses	Band at Dance	TV movie
1989	Hee Haw	Guest Performers	Season 22, episode 5 (10/14/1989)
1990	Christmas The Cowboy Way	Themselves/Various Characters	TV special
1991	Riders In The Sky	Themselves	TV series (13 episodes)
1993	A Riders In The Sky Christmas	Themselves/Various Characters	TV special
1995–1996	Riders Radio Theater: The Television Show	Themselves/Various Characters	Series of TV Specials (Four Episodes)
1998	Barney & Friends	Themselves	Performer: "How Does He Yodel" Episode: "Howdy, Friends!"
1999	Toy Story 2	(No On-Screen Appearance)	Performer: "Woody's Round-Up"
2001	For The Birds	(No On-Screen Appearance)	Performer: "Big High Wire Hop"
2003	Country Music: The Spirit of America	Themselves	
2003	Duck Dodgers	Saloon Robot Band	Episode: "The Wrath of Canasta"
2005	Stanley's Dinosaur Round-Up	Themselves	Performer: "Stanley Rides Again"
2015	Music City U.S.A.	Themselves	

== Books ==
- Cusic, Don (2003). It's the Cowboy Way!: The Amazing True Adventures of Riders in the Sky. University Press of Kentucky. 306pp. ISBN 9780813128825.
