= International Western Music Association =

WMA logo

The International Western Music Association was incorporated in 1989 to promote and preserve western music in its traditional, historical, and contemporary forms.

The IWMA hosts the International Western Music Convention every November in Albuquerque, during which it announces winners in categories including Traditional Western Duo/Group of the Year, Traditional Western Album of the Year, Song of the Year, Songwriter of the Year, Male and Female Performers of the Year, Entertainer of the Year, etc.

It also publishes The Western Way, a magazine dedicated to the promotion of western music, and sponsors the Western Music Hall of Fame.

== See also ==
- Academy of Western Artists, based in Gene Autry, Oklahoma
