= Twilight Theater (film) =

- Directed by: Perry Rosemond
- Written by: Jeffrey Barron; Carmen Finestra; Jim Fisher; Neal Israel; Gary Jacobs; Kevin Kelton; Jim Staahl
- Starring: Leslie Nielsen; Bill Murray; George Peppard; Mr. T Steve Martin; Rick Moranis; Bob Denver; Rosemary Clooney; Shelley Duvall; Carl Reiner; Michael York
- Release date: 1982
- Country: United States
- Language: English

Twilight Theater, also known as Steve Martin's Twilight Theater, is a 1982 American comedy show created by Steve Martin.
