= I Ride an Old Paint =

1927 song performed by Carl Sandburg

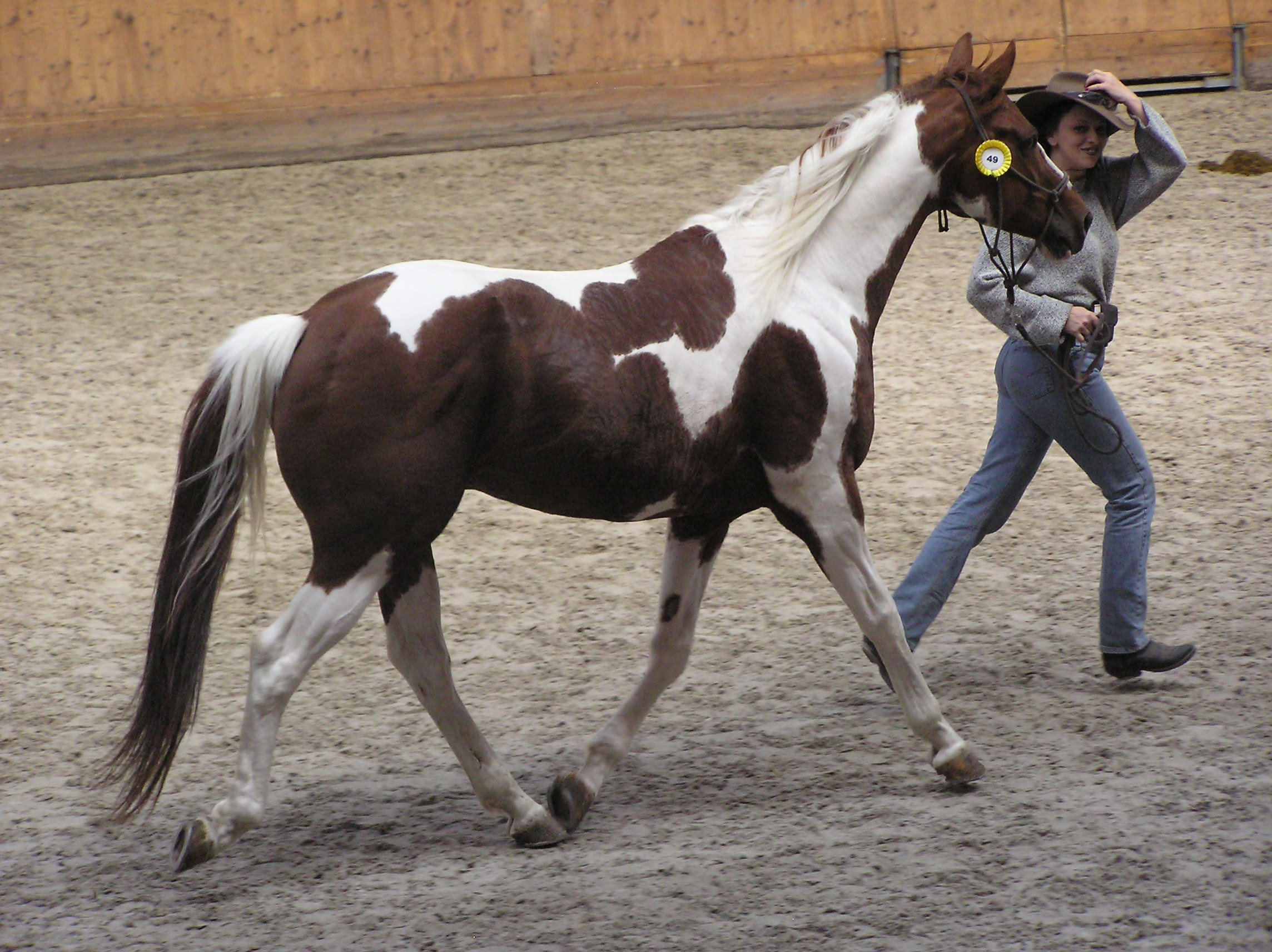
A Paint horse

I Ride an Old Paint is a traditional American cowboy song, collected and published in 1927 by Carl Sandburg in his American Songbag.

Traveling the American Southwest, Sandburg found the song through western poets Margaret Larkin and Lynn Riggs. He wrote that the song came to them in Santa Fe from a cowboy who was last heard of as heading for the Mexican border with friends. He described the song as one of a man in harmony with the values of the American West: "There is rich poetry in the image of the rider so loving a horse he begs when he dies his bones shall be tied to his horse and the two of them sent wandering with their faces turned west."

Members of the Western Writers of America chose it as one of the Top 100 Western songs of all time. The song is interpolated in Aaron Copland's ballet Rodeo, in William Grant Still's Miniatures and in Virgil Thomson's film score for The Plow that Broke the Plains.

There is disagreement among experts about the meanings of some terms in the song, namely: "snuffy", "fiery", "Dan", and "hoolihan". The houlihan is a backhand loop thrown with a lariat, typically thrown to catch horses. Notable recordings of "I Ride an Old Paint" are by the Weavers and Linda Ronstadt. Loudon Wainwright III has a particularly plaintive version he titled simply "Old Paint" on his 1971 Album II. Johnny Cash recorded a version on his 1965 album Johnny Cash Sings the Ballads of the True West. Cowboy Nation [Chip Kinman & Tony Kinman] recorded their arrangement of "Old Paint" on the self-titled album in 1996. Canadian singer Colter Wall recorded a version on his 2020 album Western Swing & Waltzes and Other Punchy Songs.
