= Joey Miskulin =

American accordionist and producer (born 1949)

- Joey Miskulin performing as "Joey the CowPolka King"

Background information
- Also known as: Joey the CowPolka King
- Born: Joseph Michael Miskulin; January 6, 1949 (age 77)
- Genre: Western swing
- Occupations: Singer; songwriter; musician
- Instruments: Vocals; accordion
- Years active: 1960–present
- Website: www.ridersinthesky.com

Joseph Michael Miskulin (born January 6, 1949) is an American accordionist and producer. In a music career spanning more than four decades, Joey Miskulin has collaborated with a range of artists including Johnny Cash, John Denver, Emmylou Harris, Paul McCartney, Ricky Skaggs, Ricky Van Shelton, Andy Williams, Frankie Yankovic, as well as many others. He is a performer, studio musician, producer and pedagogue.

== Early life ==
As a child, the only child of Slovenian and Croatian parents, in Chicago, Miskulin displayed early signs of musical prodigy, spontaneously showing an interest in the accordion by the time he was four. Beginning music training a year later, Joey was performing professionally by age eleven with the Ronnie Lee Band, and had his first recording produced by Roman Possedi at age twelve. A year later, the boy would meet Frankie Yankovic, forming a personal and professional relationship with the man known as "America's Polka King" that would last a lifetime.

== Performing career ==
Miskulin toured the United States with Yankovic as his featured accordionist for six years, writing and arranging songs between performances.

In the 1990s, he rejoined Riders In The Sky, and with them is billed as "Joey the Cowpolka King".
