= Woody Paul =

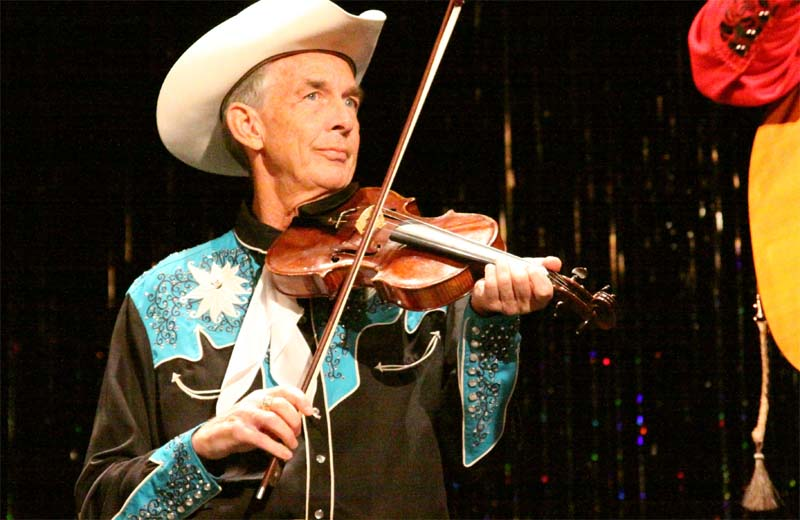
- Chrisman performing at the Poncan Theater in 2008

Background information
- Also known as: Woody Paul
- Born: Paul Woodrow Chrisman; August 23, 1949 (age 76); Nashville, Tennessee
- Genres: Western swing
- Occupations: Composer, vocalist
- Instruments: Vocals, violin
- Years active: 1976–present
- Member of: Riders in the Sky
- Website: www.ridersinthesky.com

Paul Woodrow Chrisman (born August 23, 1949), better known by his stage name Woody Paul, is an American singer, fiddler, and composer, best known for his work with the Western swing musical and comedy group Riders in the Sky. With the Riders, he is billed as "Woody Paul — King of the Cowboy Fiddlers". He was inducted into the National Fiddler Hall of Fame in 2012 and is "known in the music industry for being proficient and innovative across many musical genres including western, jazz, bluegrass, old-time, and Celtic." He has won two Grammy Awards with his band.

== Biography ==
=== Early life ===
Chrisman began playing fiddle when he was 11 years old. He played with Sam McGee and others regularly at the Grand Ole Opry in the mid-sixties. He is also extremely adept at lariat tricks. He attended Vanderbilt University in Nashville, Tennessee, and has a Ph.D. in theoretical plasma physics from MIT, where he wrote his thesis, "Inertial, Viscous, and Finite-Beta Effects in a Resistive, Time Dependent Tokamak Discharge", Thesis Nuc. Eng. 1976, PhD, supervised by James E. McCune. He returned to Nashville and began playing recording sessions and recorded and toured with Loggins & Messina.

=== Riders In The Sky ===
In 1978, Chrisman approached the Riders (then consisting of just Douglas B. Green and Fred LaBour) backstage after a show and inquired about joining the group. Shortly before Chrisman approached the Riders, Williams "Bill" Collins had just left the group, so Green and LaBour were already looking for a replacement member, and Chrisman seemed like the perfect fit. Chrisman's first show with the Riders was at the 1978 Kentucky State Fair. As of mid 2025, Chrisman no longer tours regularly with Riders in the Sky, but continues to join the group for their performances at the Grand Ole Opry.

== Songwriting ==
Prior to joining the Riders, Chrisman had already written "Blue Bonnet Lady" and "Cowboy Song" (both of which would be featured on the Riders' first album, Three on the Trail). Chrisman also wrote "So Long, Saddle Pals", what many would consider the Riders' equivalent of "Happy Trails".

== Notable filmography ==
=== Television ===
| Year | Title | Role | Notes |
|---|---|---|---|
| 1977 | Showdown At The Hoedown | Himself | PBS Documentary |
| 1982 | Twilight Theater | Woody Paul | Member of Riders In The Sky |
| 1983-1985 | Tumbleweed Theater | Woody Paul and other characters | |
| 1989 | Hee Haw | Woody Paul | Member of Riders In The Sky Season 22, episode 5 |
| 1990 | Christmas The Cowboy Way | Woody Paul | TV special |
| 1991 | Riders in the Sky | Woody Paul | 13 episodes |
| 1993 | A Riders In The Sky Christmas | Woody Paul | TV special |
| 1995-1996 | Riders Radio Theater: The Television Show | Woody Paul and other characters | Four Episodes |
| 1996 | America's Music: The Roots of Country | Himself/Woody Paul | Member of Riders In The Sky |
| 1998 | Barney & Friends | Woody Paul | Member of Riders In The Sky Episode: "Howdy, Friends!" |
| 2003 | Duck Dodgers | Saloon Robot (Voice) | Member of Riders In The Sky Episode: "The Wrath of Canasta" |

=== Film ===
| Year | Title | Role | Notes |
|---|---|---|---|
| 1985 | Sweet Dreams | Member of The Jordanaires | Credited as "Opry Band" |
| 1985 | Wild Horses | Woody Paul | Member of Riders In The Sky |
| 1999 | Toy Story 2 | | Member of Riders In The Sky Performer: "Woody's Round-Up" |
| 2003 | Country Music: The Spirit of America | Woody Paul | Member of Riders In The Sky |
| 2006 | Stanley's Dinosaur Round-Up | Woody Paul (Voice) | Member of Riders In The Sky |
| 2015 | The Cartoon Cowboys | Woody Paul (Voice) | |
| 2015 | Music City U.S.A. | Himself/Woody Paul | Member of Riders In The Sky |
