= Fred LaBour =

American singer-songwriter

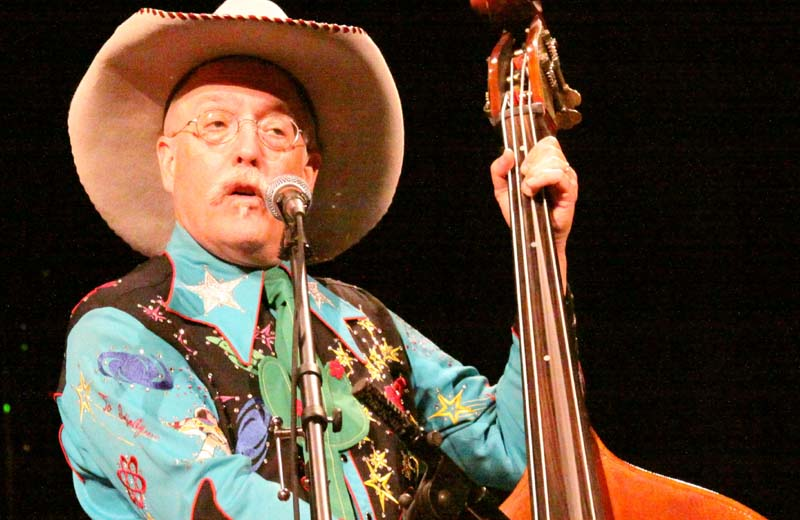
- LaBour performing at the Poncan Theater in Ponca City, Oklahoma on November 7, 2008.

Background information
- Also known as: Too Slim
- Born: Frederick Owen LaBour; June 3, 1948 (age 78); Grand Rapids, Michigan
- Genres: Western swing
- Occupations: Singer–songwriter, musician
- Instruments: Vocals, double bass
- Years active: 1971–present
- Labels: Rounder, MCA, CBS, Epic, Disney, Rykodisc
- Website: www.ridersinthesky.com

Frederick Owen LaBour (born June 3, 1948 in Grand Rapids, Michigan), better known by his stage name Too Slim, is a Grammy award-winning American musician, best known for his work with the Western swing musical and comedy group Riders in the Sky.

== Riders in the Sky ==
LaBour plays double bass and sings lead and background vocals. Prior to joining the Riders, he played with country singer Dickey Lee's band. With the Riders, he is billed as "a Righteous Tater" or "The Man of a Thousand Hats". LaBour is the central core of the Rider's comedy, with bits that include impressions of Gabby Hayes, carrying on conversations with a cow's skull, rolling tumbleweeds across the stage, and peddling a necktie in the form of a cactus, that he calls a cac-tie. A long-standing gag in the Rider's concerts is LaBour mishearing a request to play the theme from the television program Bonanza on the bass, and instead playing it by slapping his face. LaBour's repertoire of character voices include the evil Swinburne Slocum; Side Meat, a feisty chuck wagon cook whose secret biscuit ingredient is cement; Freddy La, the Surfin' Cowboy; and an assortment of frontier salesmen hawking to the cattle trade.

LaBour's stage name, "Too Slim", came from a character he created at the Nashville Public Library while working with the puppet theater called "Singing Cowboy Slim", and from Ed "Too Tall" Jones, a football player at Tennessee State University who later joined the Dallas Cowboys.

LaBour has a master's degree in Wildlife Management from the University of Michigan.

He provides commentary with fellow Rider in the Sky Douglas B. Green's satellite radio show "Ranger Doug's Classic Cowboy Corral" in the role of Ranger Doug's sidekick, the crusty old trail cook called Sidemeat. The show currently airs Fridays at 11 p.m. ET, Saturdays at 8 p.m. ET, and Sundays at 9 a.m. ET on Sirius-XM's Willie's RoadHouse SiriusXM Channel 61.

== "Paul is Dead" ==
LaBour was instrumental in the spread of the Paul is Dead urban legend. While a junior at the University of Michigan, having heard the October 12, 1969, WKNR broadcast about the rumor, he and John Gray wrote a satiric parody review of Abbey Road called "McCartney Dead; New Evidence Brought to Light", itemising various "clues", many of them of their own invention, of McCartney's death. The article was published in the October 14, 1969, issue of the Michigan Daily. Rolling Stone described LaBour's article as "the most baroque explication" of the supposed death, claiming that the Abbey Road cover photo depicted a funeral procession from a cemetery, with John as "anthropomorphic God, followed by Ringo the undertaker, followed by Paul the resurrected, barefoot with a cigarette in his right hand (the original was left-handed), followed by George, the grave digger", and adding details that Paul had died in a car crash three years earlier, the top of his head sheared off, and that he was the subject of the "A Day in the Life" car crash on Sgt. Pepper's Lonely Hearts Club Band. LaBour and Gray were astonished when the story was picked up first by newspapers in Detroit, then Chicago, and by the weekend, both coasts. Beatles scholar Andru J. Reeve opined that LaBour's story was "the single most significant factor in the breadth of the rumor's spread."

LaBour also participated in an RKO television special that featured celebrity attorney F. Lee Bailey conducting a mock trial in which he examined various expert "witnesses" on the subject of McCartney's alleged death. LaBour told Bailey during a pre-show meeting that he had made the whole thing up. Bailey responded, "Well, we have an hour of television to do. You're going to have to go along with this." The program aired locally in New York City on November 30, 1969, and was never re-aired.

LaBour was interviewed about his role in these events in the 2005 NPS Dutch television documentary, Who Buried Paul McCartney?

== Plaza Hotel ==
In a 1991 article in The New York Times, LaBour was quoted in opposition to Donald Trump's plans to convert the Plaza Hotel to condominiums. "A little bitty room like this? No way. I for one would probably take my business to Newark. The value of the Plaza cannot be determined by dollars and cents. There's a sense of place that transcends the bottom line."

== Discography ==
=== As solo artist ===
| Title | Type | Release date | Label |
|---|---|---|---|
| Say No More | studio | 2013 | Too Slim Music (BMI) |

=== As sideman ===
With Riders in the Sky

- Riders in the Sky discography

== Filmography ==
=== Films ===
| Year | Title | Role | Notes |
|---|---|---|---|
| 1974 | The Thorn | The Angel Fred | |
| 1985 | Sweet Dreams | Member of The Jordanaires | Credited as "Opry Band" |
| 1985 | Wild Horses | Too Slim | Member of Riders in the Sky |
| 1999 | Toy Story 2 | | Member of Riders in the Sky Performer: "Woody's Round-Up" |
| 2000 | For the Birds | | Member of Riders in the Sky Performer: "Big High Wire Hop" |
| 2000 | Buzz Lightyear of Star Command: The Adventure Begins | | Writer: "To Infinity and Beyond" |
| 2003 | Country Music: The Spirit of America | Too Slim | Member of Riders in the Sky |
| 2006 | Stanley's Dinosaur Round-Up | Too Slim (Voice) | Member of Riders in the Sky |
| 2015 | The Cartoon Cowboys | Too Slim (Voice); Sidemeat (Voice) | |
| 2015 | Music City U.S.A | Himself/Too Slim | Member of Riders in the Sky |

=== Television ===
| Year | Title | Role | Notes |
|---|---|---|---|
| 1969 | Paul McCartney, The Complete Story Told For The First and Last Time | Himself | |
| 1982 | Twilight Theater | Too Slim | Member of Riders in the Sky |
| 1983-1985 | Tumbleweed Theater | Too Slim and other characters | LaBour was also a writer on the series. |
| 1989 | Hee Haw | Too Slim | Member of Riders in the Sky Season 22, Episode 5 |
| 1990 | Christmas The Cowboy Way | Too Slim, Sidemeat | TV special Writer |
| 1991 | Riders In The Sky | Too Slim | 13 Episodes |
| 1993 | A Riders In The Sky Christmas | Too Slim | TV special Writer |
| 1995-1996 | Riders Radio Theater: The Television Show | Too Slim and other characters | Four Episodes Writer |
| 1996 | America's Music: The Roots of Country | Himself/Too Slim | Member of Riders in the Sky |
| 1998 | Barney & Friends | Too Slim | Member of Riders in the Sky Episode: "Howdy, Friends!" |
| 2003 | Duck Dodgers | Saloon Robot (Voice) | Member of Riders in the Sky Episode: "The Wrath of Canasta" |
| 2006 | Who Buried Paul McCarney? | Himself | Documentary |
