= Douglas B. Green =

American musician (born 1946)

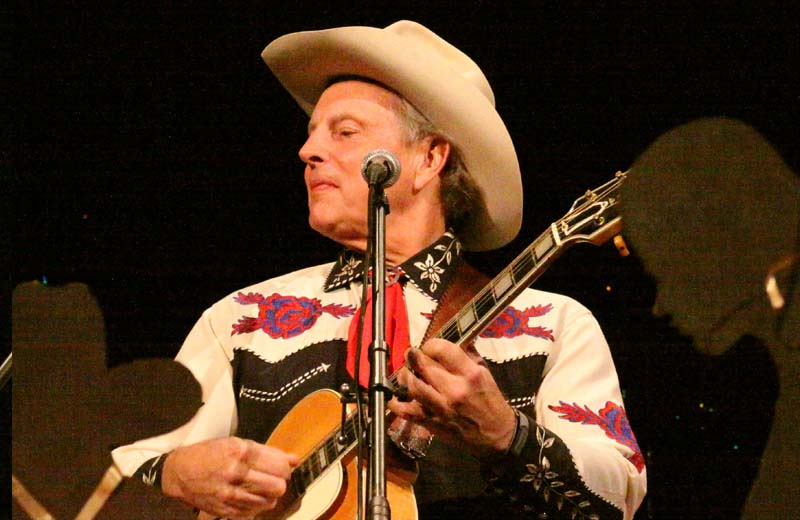
- Green performing at the Poncan Theater in 2008

Background information
- Also known as: Ranger Doug
- Born: Douglas Bruce Green; March 20, 1946 (age 80); North Chicago, Illinois, U.S.
- Genres: Western swing
- Occupations: Composer, vocalist, author
- Instruments: Vocals, guitar
- Years active: 1967–present
- Website: www.ridersinthesky.com www.thetimejumpers.com

Douglas Bruce Green (born March 20, 1946), better known by his stage name Ranger Doug, is an American musician, arranger, award-winning Western music songwriter, and Grand Ole Opry member best known for his work with Western music and the group Riders in the Sky in which he plays guitar and sings lead and baritone vocals. He is also a yodeler. With the Riders, he is billed as "Ranger Doug — The Idol of American Youth" and "Governor of the Great State of Rhythm". He is also a member of The Time Jumpers.

== Early life and education ==
Green graduated from Cranbrook in 1964, and the University of Michigan in 1968. He has a master's degree in Literature from Vanderbilt University in Nashville, Tennessee. He continues to write as a music historian. His 2002 Vanderbilt University Press book "Singing in the Saddle" was the first comprehensive look at the singing cowboy phenomenon that swept the United States in the 1930s.

== Career ==
He hosts "Ranger Doug's Classic Cowboy Corral" satellite radio show, delving into his personal vintage cowboy music collection. The show features the music of such classic western performers as Gene Autry, Roy Rogers, Tex Ritter, Rex Allen, and the Sons of the Pioneers, as well as more obscure recordings. Green provides commentary with fellow Rider in the Sky Fred LaBour (stand-up bassist stage-named Too Slim) in the role of Ranger Doug's sidekick, the crusty old trail cook called Sidemeat. The show currently airs Fridays at 11 pm ET, Saturdays at 8 pm ET, and Sundays at 9 am ET, on Sirius/XM's Willie's Roadhouse Channel SiriusXM56.

Prior to forming Riders in the Sky, he performed with The Boys from Shiloh, The Shinbone Alley All Stars, and The Doug Green Band. In 1967 and 1969 he worked two stints with Bill Monroe's Blue Grass Boys and one with Jimmy Martin in 1969. He recorded two albums in 1972 with Vic Jordan and the Buck White Family, one of gospel songs (In God's Eyes) and one traditional bluegrass named after his daughters Liza Jane and Sally Anne. Green has also recorded the solo album Songs of the Sage.
