= 1863 in music =

== Events ==
- January 6 – Johannes Brahms' Piano Sonata no. 3 is premiered in Vienna, played by the 29-year-old composer. Richard Wagner is among the audience.
- January 29 – Established composer Giacomo Meyerbeer presents the young Jacques Offenbach to Augusta of Saxe-Weimar-Eisenach, the queen consort of Prussia.
- February 8 – Richard Wagner conducts a concert of his own music in Prague; Antonín Dvořák is a member of the orchestra.
- February-April – Richard Wagner conducts a concert of his own music in Saint Petersburg. Tchaikovsky and César Cui attend. Works performed included excerpts from Tristan und Isolde, Das Rheingold, Die Walküre and the overture to Die Meistersinger von Nürnberg.
- February 25 – Johann Strauss II is appointed musical director of the Hofball.
- March 15 – In Vienna, Franz Schubert's Der Entfernten D.331 for a male vocal quartet is performed in public for the first time, 35 years after the composer's death.
- April 19 – Hector Berlioz is presented with the Cross of the Order of Hohenzollern.
- May 10 – Violinist Joseph Joachim marries contralto Amalie Schneeweiss.
- May 12 – Richard Wagner takes up residence at Penzing, near Vienna.
- June 20 – Franz Liszt takes up residence at the Dominican monastery of the Madonna del Rosario, Monte Mario, near Rome.
- July 11 – Pope Pius IX visits Franz Liszt at Monte Mario, and the two hold an impromptu concert.
- August 3 – 21-year-old Jules Massenet is awarded the First Grand Prix de Rome for his setting of the cantata David Rizzio.
- September 30 – Georges Bizet's opera, Les pêcheurs de perles receives its première at the Théâtre Lyrique in Paris.
- November 2 – John Knowles Paine performs at the inauguration of a new organ at the Music Hall in Boston, Massachusetts, USA.
- November 4 – Les Troyens, opera by Hector Berlioz, debuts, also at the Théâtre Lyrique
- December 13 – Modest Mussorgsky becomes collegiate secretary at the chief engineering department of the Russian Ministry of Communications. In the same year, he begins work on an opera, Salammbô, which is never finished.
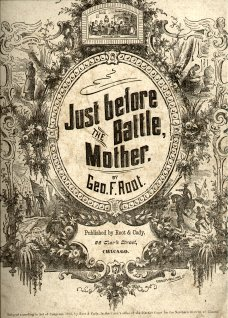

== Published popular music ==
- "All Quiet Along the Potomac Tonight" w. Ethel Lynn Beers m. John Hill Hewitt
- "Eton Boating Song" w. William Johnson Cory m. Capt. Algernon Drummond
- "For the Dear Old Flag I Die" by Stephen Foster
- "Just Before the Battle, Mother" by George F. Root
- "Katy Bell" by Stephen Foster
- "Mother Would Comfort Me" w.m. Charles C. Sawyer
- "My Wife Is a Most Knowing Woman" by Stephen Foster
- "Oh My Darling, Clementine" by Percy Montrose & H S. Thompson
- "Sweet and Low" words by Alfred Tennyson, music by Joseph Barnby
- "Tenting on the Old Camp Ground" w.m. Walter Kittredge
- "Weeping Sad And Lonely" w. Charles Carroll Sawyer m. Henry Tucker
- "When Johnny Comes Marching Home Again" w.m. 'Louis Lambert' (Patrick Gilmore) (copyrighted September 26)
- "When This Dreadful War Is Ended" by Stephen Foster
- "You Are Going to the Wars, Willie Boy!" w.m. John Hill Hewitt
- "The Young Volunteer" w.m. John Hill Hewitt

== Classical music ==
- Mily Balakirev – On the Volga
- Johannes Brahms – Studies for Pianoforte: Variations on a Theme of Paganini Op. 35
- Max Bruch – 10 Songs for Voice and Piano, Op.17
- Anton Bruckner – Study Symphony in F minor
- Edvard Grieg
  - Poetic Tone-Pictures, Op.3
  - 4 Songs for Male Voices, EG 160
- Halfdan Kjerulf – 4 Sange, Op.10
- Franz Liszt
  - Salve Polonia (S 518)
  - Rhapsodie espagnole (S 254)
  - 'Venezia e Napoli' – Tarantella
  - Deux légendes
  - Two Concert Études
- Joachim Raff
  - Suite No.1 for Orchestra, Op.101
  - Piano Trio No.2, Op.112
- Henrik Rung – Det Svundne og det Vundne
- Camille Saint-Saëns
  - Piano Trio No. 1 in F major opus 18,
  - Spartacus overture in E♭ major
  - Introduction and Rondo Capriccioso Op. 28
- William Stanley – New South Wales volunteer Rifles Quick March
- Johann Strauss II
  - Leitartikel (Leading Article) Op. 273
  - Morgenblätter (Morning Journals), Op. 279

== Opera ==
- Hector Berlioz – Les Troyens
- Georges Bizet – Les pêcheurs de perles (The Pearl Fishers)
- Max Bruch – Die Loreley
- Charles Gounod – Mireille (opera)
- Giovanni Pacini – Carmelita (not performed)
- Jacques Offenbach – Il signor Fagotto
- Semen Hulak-Artemovsky – Zaporozhets za Dunayem

== Musical theater ==
- Ixion London production opened at the Royalty Theatre on September 28 and ran for 153 performances

== Births ==
- February 4 – Pauline de Ahna, operatic soprano (died 1950)
- February 5 – Armand Parent, composer (died 1934)
- February 13 – Hugo Becker, composer (died 1941)
- February 19 – Emánuel Moór, composer (died 1931)
- February – George J. Gaskin, tenor (died 1920)
- March 20 – Ernesto Nazareth, pianist and composer (died 1934)
- March 21 – Hugo Kaun, conductor, composer and music teacher (died 1932)
- April 3 – Wilhelm Middelschulte, composer (died 1943)
- April 4 – Blanche Marchesi, operatic contralto (died 1940)
- April 9 – Ernst Heuser, German composer (died 1942)
- April 19 – Felix Blumenfeld, Russian composer, pianist (died 1931)
- May 10
  - Upendrakishore Ray Chowdhury, Bengali writer, painter, violin player and composer (died 1915)
  - Charles René, composer (died 1935)
- May 12
  - Charles Bordes, composer (died 1909)
  - Henry Expert, musicologist (died 1952)
- May 19 – Ottilie Collin, Austrian soprano (died 1960)
- June 2 – Felix von Weingartner, composer, conductor (died 1942)
- June 5
  - Arthur Somervell (died 1937)
  - Adolf Schuppan, composer (died c. 1931)
- June 13 – Josef Venantius Wöss, composer (died 1943)
- June 16 – Paul Antonin Vidal, composer (died 1931)
- July 20 – W. H. Neidlinger, composer (died 1924)
- July 28 – Carl Adolph Preyer, composer, pianist (died 1947)
- August 11 – Árpád Szendy, composer (died 1922)
- August 16 – Gabriel Pierné, composer (died 1937)
- September 2 – Isidor Philipp, composer (died 1958)
- September 15 – Horatio Parker, composer (died 1919)
- November 1 – Alfred Reisenauer, composer (died 1907)
- December 7 – Pietro Mascagni, composer (died 1945)
- December 17 – Ion Vidu, composer (died 1931)
- December 24 – Enrique Fernández Arbós, violinist, conductor and composer (died 1939)

== Deaths ==
- February 4 – Giuseppe Lillo, composer, 38
- February 25 – Laure Cinti-Damoreau, operatic soprano, 62
- March 23 – Charles William Glover, composer (born 1806)
- April 8 – Joseph Netherclift, composer, 70
- May 14
  - Ferdinand Beyer, composer (born 1803)
  - Émile Prudent, composer, 46
- June – Filippo Colini, operatic baritone, 51
- June 7 – Franz Xaver Gruber, composer of "Silent Night", 75
- June 12 – Pietro Alfieri, Roman Catholic music writer, 61
- June 20 – Luigi Felice Rossi, composer, 57
- June 22 – Carl Schuberth, composer (born 1811)
- July 23 – Sophie Lebrun, pianist and composer, 82
- August 5 – Adolf Friedrich Hesse, composer, 53
