= 1942 in music =

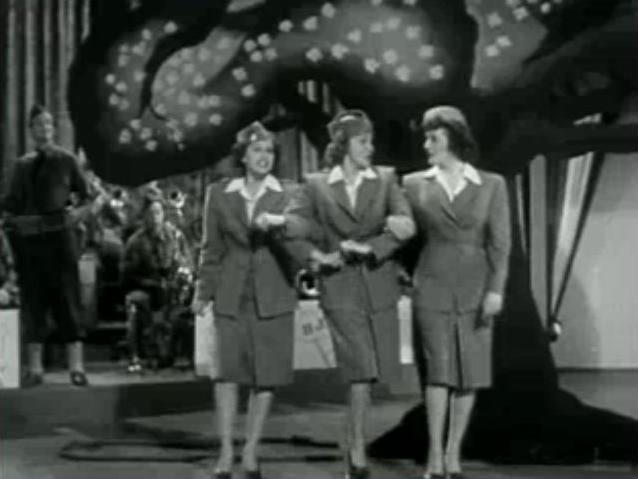
The Andrews Sisters performing "Don't Sit Under The Apple Tree" in 1942.

This is a list of notable events in music that took place in the year 1942.

== Specific locations ==
- 1942 in British music
- 1942 in Norwegian music

== Specific genres ==
- 1942 in country music
- 1942 in jazz

== Events ==
- February 10 – Glenn Miller receives his first gold disc, for "Chattanooga Choo Choo".
- March 1 – Marianne Lorraine appears with John Serry Sr. at The Town Hall (New York City) in a performance of poetry by Carl Sandburg and Archibald MacLeish as presented by the Free World Association and sponsored by Eleanor Roosevelt.
- March 5 – World première of Shostakovich's Symphony No. 7 (Leningrad), given by the Bolshoi Theatre Orchestra conducted by Samuil Samosud at Kuybyshev in Russia and broadcast across the Soviet Union. Premières in Moscow, London and New York follow by the end of July.
- March 27 – Johnny Mercer, Buddy DeSylva, and Glenn Wallichs take the first legal steps towards founding Capitol Records in the United States.
- June 22 – The Paronyan Musical Comedy Theatre of Yerevan opens in Yerevan, Armenia.
- July 8 – Music variety show Uncle Walter's Doghouse is broadcast for the last time on NBC radio in the United States.
- July 21 – In celebration of its 25th anniversary, the Goldman Band performs a unique concert, playing all original works. This is the first time a concert of music originally composed for the wind ensemble has been performed.
- August 1 – James Petrillo, leader of the American Federation of Musicians, orders a ban on musicians recording new material. The labels Decca and Capitol negotiate an end to the ban in 1943, but RCA Victor and Columbia Records hold out until 1944. The strike does not include live performances in concerts and on the radio.
- August 9 – Leningrad première of Shostakovich's Symphony No. 7 with the city still under siege.
- Autumn – Hans Krása's children's opera Brundibár is premiered in the Jewish orphanage in Prague after the composer has been transported to the Theresienstadt Ghetto (August 10).
- Bunk Johnson makes his first recordings.

== Albums released ==
- Song Hits from Holiday Inn – Bing Crosby
- Selections from George Gershwin's Folk Opera Porgy and Bess – Various artists

== Top popular recordings 1942 ==
The following songs appeared in The Billboard's 'Best Selling Retail Records' chart during 1942. Each week fifteen points were awarded to the number one record, then nine points for number two, eight points for number three, and so on. The total points a record earned determined its year-end rank. Regional charts determined the 11–25 rankings each week, and records that failed to score on the main chart were ranked by highest position. Additional information was obtained from the "Discography of American Historical Recordings" website, Joel Whitburn's Pop Memories 1890–1954 and other sources as specified.

The following songs appeared in The Billboard's 'Best Selling Retail Records' chart during 1942.

| Rank | Artist | Title | Label | Recorded | Released | Chart positions |
|---|---|---|---|---|---|---|
| 1 | Bing Crosby | "White Christmas" | Decca 18429 | May 29, 1942 | July 30, 1942 | US Billboard 1942 #1, US Pop #1 for 11 weeks, 17 total weeks, 191 points, 2,600,000 sales 1944, 50,000,000 2007, Grammy Hall of Fame 1974 |
| 2 | Glenn Miller and his Orchestra | "(I've Got a Gal In) Kalamazoo" | Victor 27934 | August 1, 1942 | September 12, 1942 | US Billboard 1942 #2, US Pop #1 for 7 weeks, 18 total weeks, 181 points, 1,000,000 sales |
| 3 | Glenn Miller and his Orchestra | "Moonlight Cocktail" | Bluebird 11401 | May 7, 1941 | July 25, 1941 | US Billboard 1942 #3, US Pop #1 for 10 weeks, 21 total weeks, 178 points, 1,000,000 sales |
| 4 | Kay Kyser and his Orchestra | "Who Wouldn't Love You" | Columbia 36526 | April 4, 1942 | June 20, 1942 | US Billboard 1942 #4, US Pop #2 for 8 weeks, 25 total weeks, 157 points, 1,000,000 sales |
| 5 | Harry James and his Orchestra | "Sleepy Lagoon" | Columbia 36549 | February 24, 1942 | March 1942 | US Billboard 1942 #5, US Pop #1 for 4 weeks, 23 total weeks, 153 points |
| 6 | Kay Kyser and his Orchestra | "Jingle Jangle Jingle" | Columbia 36604 | July 4, 1942 | July 18, 1942 | US Billboard 1942 #6, US Pop #1 for 8 weeks, 13 total weeks, 153 points, 1,000,000 sales |
| 7 | Jimmy Dorsey and his Orchestra (Vocal Bob Eberle & Helen O'connell) | "Tangerine" | Decca 4123 | January 24, 1942 | May 9, 1942 | US Billboard 1942 #7, US Pop #1 for 6 weeks, 20 total weeks, 148 points |
| 8 | Glenn Miller and his Orchestra | "A String of Pearls" | Bluebird 11382 | December 27, 1941 | February 7, 1942 | US Billboard 1942 #8, US Pop #1 for 2 weeks, 22 total weeks, 128 points, 1,000,000 sales |
| 9 | Benny Goodman and his Orchestra | "Jersey Bounce" | Okeh 6590 | March 14, 1942 | April 25, 1942 | US Billboard 1942 #9, US Pop #2 for 6 weeks, 23 total weeks, 119 points |
| 10 | Kay Kyser and his Orchestra | "Praise the Lord and Pass the Ammunition" | Columbia 36640 | October 17, 1942 | October 31, 1942 | US Billboard 1942 #10, US Pop #2 for 7 weeks, 14 total weeks, 109 points, 1,000,000 sales |
| 11 | Glenn Miller and his Orchestra | "Serenade in Blue" | Victor 27935 | September 12, 1942 | October 10, 1942 | US Billboard 1942 #11, US Pop #2 for 1 weeks, 19 total weeks, 92 points |
| 12 | Glenn Miller and his Orchestra | "Don't Sit Under The Apple Tree (With Anyone else But Me)" | Bluebird 11474 | March 21, 1942 | June 6, 1942 | US Billboard 1942 #12, US Pop #2 for 2 weeks, 20 total weeks, 81 points |
| 13 | Woody Herman and His Orchestra | "Blues In the Night" | Decca 4030 | November 8, 1941 | December 1941 | US Billboard 1942 #13, US Pop #1 for 1 weeks, 21 total weeks, 78 points |
| 14 | Harry James and his Orchestra | "I Don't Want To Walk Without You" | Columbia 36478 | December 11, 1941 | January 2, 1942 | US Billboard 1942 #14, US Pop #2 for 5 weeks, 17 total weeks, 77 points |
| 15 | Vaughn Monroe and his Orchestra | "When The Lights Go On Again (All Over The World)" | Victor 27945 | July 8, 1942 | July 24, 1942 | US Billboard 1942 #15, US Pop #2 for 1 weeks, 18 total weeks, 77 points |
| 16 | Kay Kyser and his Orchestra | "He Wears a Pair of Silver Wings" | Columbia 36604 | August 8, 1942 | September 5, 1942 | US Billboard 1942 #16, US Pop #2 for 4 weeks, 12 total weeks, 70 points |
| 17 | Charlie Spivak and his Orchestra | "My Devotion" | Columbia 36620 | September 5, 1942 | October 3, 1942 | US Billboard 1942 #17, US Pop #2 for 2 weeks, 13 total weeks, 70 points |
| 18 | Alvino Rey and his Orchestra | "I Said No!" | Bluebird 11391 | December 27, 1941 | February 21, 1942 | US Billboard 1942 #18, US Pop #2 for 1 weeks, 15 total weeks, 54 points |
| 19 | Spike Jones and His City Slickers | "Der Fuehrer's Face" | Bluebird 11586 | July 28, 1942 | September 11, 1942 | US Billboard 1942 #19, US Pop #3 for 1 week, 16 total weeks, 50 points |
| 20 | Harry James and His Orchestra (vocal Helen Forrest) | "Mister Five By Five" | Columbia 36650 | July 31, 1942 | October 1942 | US Billboard 1942 #20, US Pop #2 for 1 weeks, 15 total weeks, 48 points |

== Published popular music ==
- "C Jam Blues" music: Duke Ellington
- "Murder", He Says!" words: Frank Loesser, music: Jimmy McHugh
- "Abraham" w.m. Irving Berlin
- "Ain't Got A Dime To My Name" w. Johnny Burke m. Jimmy Van Heusen
- "At Last" w. Mack Gordon m. Harry Warren
- "Baltimore Oriole" w. Paul Francis Webster & Hoagy Carmichael
- "Be Careful, It's My Heart" w.m. Irving Berlin
- "Be Like the Kettle and Sing" w.m. Connor, O'Connor & Ridley
- "Boom Shot" w. Glenn Miller & Billy May, under pseudonym Arletta May
- "Born To Lose" w.m. Frankie Brown
- "Constantly" w. Johnny Burke m. Jimmy Van Heusen. Introduced by Bing Crosby in the film Road to Morocco
- "Cow-Cow Boogie" w.m. Don Raye, Gene de Paul & Benny Carter
- "Dearly Beloved" w. Johnny Mercer m. Jerome Kern
- "Don't Get Around Much Anymore" w. Bob Russell m. Duke Ellington
- "Don't Sit Under the Apple Tree" w. Lew Brown & Charles Tobias m. Sam H. Stept
- "Ev'rything I've Got" w. Lorenz Hart m. Richard Rodgers from the musical By Jupiter
- "Happiness Is Just A Thing Called Joe" w. E. Y. Harburg m. Harold Arlen
- "Happy Holiday" w.m. Irving Berlin
- "Holiday for Strings" m. David Rose
- "The House I Live In" w.m. Earl Robinson & Lewis Allan
- "I Came Here To Talk For Joe" w. Charles Tobias & Lew Brown m. Sam H. Stept
- "I Get the Neck of the Chicken" w. Frank Loesser m. Jimmy McHugh. Introduced by Marcy McGuire in the film Seven Days' Leave
- "I Had the Craziest Dream" w. Mack Gordon m. Harry Warren. Introduced by Helen Forrest with Harry James and his Music in the film Springtime in the Rockies.
- "I Left My Heart At The Stage Door Canteen" w.m. Irving Berlin
- "I Lost My Sugar In Salt Lake City" w.m. Leon René & Johnny Lange
- "I Threw A Kiss In The Ocean" w.m. Irving Berlin
- "If You Are But A Dream" w.m. Moe Jaffe, Jack Fulton & Nat Bonx
- "If You Build A Better Mousetrap" Johnny Mercer, Victor Schertzinger
- "I'll Be Around" w.m. Alec Wilder
- "I'll Capture Your Heart" w.m. Irving Berlin
- "I'm Getting Tired So I Can Sleep" w.m. Irving Berlin
- "I'm Old Fashioned" w. Johnny Mercer m. Jerome Kern
- "In The Blue Of Evening" w. Tom Adair m. Alfred D'Artega
- "It Must Be Jelly ('Cause Jam Don't Shake Like That)" w. Sunny Skylar m. Chummy MacGregor & George Williams
- "(I've Got a Gal In) Kalamazoo" w. Mack Gordon m. Harry Warren
- "I've Heard That Song Before" w. Sammy Cahn m. Jule Styne
- "Jingle Jangle Jingle" w. Frank Loesser m. Joseph J. Lilley
- "Johnny Doughboy Found A Rose In Ireland" w. Kay Twomey m. Al Goodhart
- "Juke Box Saturday Night" w. Al Stillman m. Paul McGrane
- "The Lamplighter's Serenade" w. Paul Francis Webster m. Hoagy Carmichael
- "Let's Get Lost" w. Frank Loesser m. Jimmy McHugh
- "Let's Start The New Year Right" w.m. Irving Berlin
- "Lover Man" w.m. Jimmy Davis, Roger "Ram"Ramirez & Jimmy Sherman
- "Mad About Him, Sad About Him, How Can I Be Glad About Him Blues" w.m. Larry Markes & Dick Charles
- "Mister Five By Five" w.m. Don Raye & Gene de Paul
- "Moonlight Becomes You" w. Johnny Burke m. Jimmy Van Heusen
- "My Devotion" w.m. Roc Hillman & Johnny Napton
- "One Dozen Roses" w. Roger Lewis & Country Washburn m. Dick Jurgens & Walter Donovan
- "Pennsylvania Polka" w.m. Lester Lee & Zeke Manners
- "People Like You And Me" w. Mack Gordon m. Harry Warren
- "Perdido" w. Hans Lengsfelder & Ervin Drake m. Juan Tizol
- "Pistol Packin' Mama" w.m. Al Dexter
- "Praise the Lord and Pass the Ammunition" w.m. Frank Loesser
- "Put Your Dreams Away" w.m. Ruth Lowe, Stephan Weiss & Paul Mann
- "The Road To Morocco" w. Johnny Burke m. Jimmy Van Heusen
- "Rose Ann Of Charing Cross" w. Kermit Goell m. Mabel Wayne
- "Serenade in Blue" w. Mack Gordon m. Harry Warren
- "Skylark" w. Johnny Mercer m. Hoagy Carmichael
- "Strip Polka" w.m. Johnny Mercer
- "That Old Black Magic" w. Johnny Mercer m. Harold Arlen
- "That's Sabotage" w. Mack Gordon m. Harry Warren
- "There Are Such Things" w.m. Stanley Adams, Abel Baer & George W. Meyer
- "There Will Never Be Another You" w. Mack Gordon m. Harry Warren
- "This Is The Army, Mr Jones" w.m. Irving Berlin
- "This Is Worth Fighting For" w. Eddie De Lange m. Sam H. Stept
- "Three Little Sisters" w.m. Irving Taylor & Vic Mizzy
- "Trav'lin' Light" w. Sidney Clare m. Harry Akst
- "There Won't Be a Shortage of Love" w.m. Carmen Lombardo and John Jacob Loeb
- "Tweedle-O-Twill" w.m. Gene Autry & Fred Rose
- "Wait Till You See Her" w. Lorenz Hart m. Richard Rodgers. Introduced by Ronnie Graham in the musical By Jupiter
- "Warsaw Concerto" m. Richard Addinsell
- "When the Lights Go On Again" w.m. Eddie Seiler, Sol Marcus & Bennie Benjamin
- "White Christmas" w.m. Irving Berlin
- "Why Don't You Do Right?" w.m. Joe McCoy
- "You Were Never Lovelier" w. Johnny Mercer m. Jerome Kern
- "You'd Be So Nice To Come Home To" w.m. Cole Porter. Performed in the 1943 musical film Something to Shout About by Don Ameche and Janet Blair.

== Classical music ==
=== Premieres ===
| Composer | Composition | Date | Location | Performers |
|---|---|---|---|---|
| Barber, Samuel | Second Essay for Orchestra | 1942-04-16 | New York City | New York Philharmonic – Walter |
| Britten, Benjamin | A Ceremony of Carols | 1942-12-05 | Norwich, UK | Mason / The Fleet Street Choir – Lawrence |
| Britten, Benjamin | Diversions for Piano Left Hand and Orchestra | 1942-01-16 | Philadelphia | Wittgenstein / Philadelphia Orchestra – Ormandy |
| Carpenter, John Alden | Symphony No. 2 | 1942-10-22 | New York City | New York Philharmonic – Walter |
| Chávez, Carlos | Piano Concerto | 1942-01-01 | New York City | Eugene List (piano) New York Philharmonic – Mitropoulos |
| Copland, Aaron | Statements | 1942-01-07 | New York City | New York Philharmonic – Bernstein |
| Casella, Alfredo | Paganiniana | 1942-04-14 | Vienna | Vienna Philharmonic – Böhm |
| Finzi, Gerald | Let Us Garlands Bring | 1942-10-12 | London | Irvin, Ferguson |
| Guarnieri, Camargo | Abertura concertante | 1942-06-02 | São Paulo | Artistic Culture Society Orchestra – De Souza Lima |
| Jolivet, André | Cosmogonie | 1942-03-04 | Nice | French National Symphony – D'Auriol |
| Krenek, Ernst | I Wonder as I Wander | 1942-12-11 | Minneapolis | Minneapolis Symphony – Mitropoulos |
| Maderna, Bruno | Piano Concerto | 1942-06-22 | Venice | Gorini / Marcello Conservatory Orchestra – Gracis |
| Martin, Frank | Sonata da chiesa for flute and organ | 1942-06-11 | Lausanne, Switzerland | M. Martin, Faller |
| Martinů, Bohuslav | Symphony No. 1 | 1942-11-13 | Boston | Boston Symphony – Koussevitzky |
| Myaskovsky, Nikolai | Symphonic Ballade (Symphony No. 22) | 1942-01-12 | Tbilisi, Soviet Union | [unknown orchestra] – Stasevich |
| Myaskovsky, Nikolai | Symphony No. 23 | 1942-06-05 | Moscow | |
| Prokofiev, Sergei | String Quartet No. 2 | 1942-04-07 | Moscow | Beethoven Quartet |
| Shostakovich, Dmitri | Leningrad Symphony (Symphony No. 7) | 1942-03-05 | Kuibyshev, Soviet Union | Bolshoi Theatre Orchestra – Samosud |
| Stravinsky, Igor | Danses concertantes | 1942-02-08 | Los Angeles | Janssen Symphony – Stravinsky |
| Tippett, Michael | Fantasia on a Theme of Handel | 1942-03-07 | London | Sellick / Goehr Orchestra – Goehr |
| Villa-Lobos, Heitor | Rudepoêma | 1942-07-15 | Rio de Janeiro | Municipal Theatre Symphony – Villa-Lobos |
| Villa-Lobos, Heitor | Five Preludes for guitar | 1942-12-11 | Montevideo, Uruguay | Abel Carlevaro – Villa-Lobos |

=== Compositions ===
- Arthur Benjamin – Concerto for Oboe on Themes by Cimarosa
- Alessandro Casagrande – Messa, in re minore, per soli coro e orchestra
- Aaron Copland
  - Fanfare for the Common Man
  - Rodeo (ballet)
  - Lincoln Portrait
- Gerald Finzi – Let Us Garlands Bring Op. 18, song cycle on texts by Shakespeare
- Camargo Guarnieri – Abertura Concertante
- Carlos Guastavino – Once Upon A Time (ballet)
- Roy Harris – Symphony No. 5
- Paul Hindemith – "Abendständchen," "Abendwolke" (Lieder)
- Aram Khachaturian – Gayane (ballet)
- Paul von Klenau
  - Symphony No. 8 Im Alten Stil
  - String Quartet No. 2
- Raoul Koczalski – Kleine Sonate, Op. 146
- Charles Koechlin
  - Fourteen pieces for oboe and piano, Op. 179
  - Fifteen pieces for horn and piano, Op. 180
  - Three sonatines for solo flute, Op. 184
  - Suite for solo English horn, Op. 185
  - Twenty-four duos for two saxophones Op. 186
- Bohuslav Martinů
  - Madrigal-Sonata, H. 291
  - Piano Quartet No. 1
  - Variations on a Theme of Rossini, H. 290
- Selim Palmgren
  - Sun & Clouds, 12 Pieces for Piano, Op. 102
  - Jouluaatto ("Christmas Morning") for Chorus and Orchestra, Op. 103a
- Andrzej Panufnik – Tragic Overture
- Robert de Roos – String Quartet No. 2
- Arnold Schoenberg – Piano Concerto, Op. 42
- John Serry Sr. – Tarantella for Stradella Accordion
- Nikos Skalkottas
  - Double Bass Concerto
  - Little Suite for strings
- Richard Strauss – Horn Concerto No. 2, TrV 283
- Igor Stravinsky – Four Norwegian Moods
- Heitor Villa-Lobos – String Quartet No. 7

== Opera ==
- Dmitry Kabalevsky – In the Fire

== Film ==
- Frank Churchill – Bambi
- Erich Korngold – Kings Row
- Miklós Rózsa - Jungle Book
- Max Steiner
  - Casablanca
  - Now, Voyager
- William Walton – The First of the Few

== Musical theatre ==
- Beat the Band, Broadway production opened at the 46th Street Theatre on October 14 and ran for 67 performances
- By Jupiter, Broadway production opened at the Shubert Theatre on June 2 and ran for 421 performances
- Du Barry Was A Lady, London production opened at His Majesty's Theatre on October 22 and ran for 178 performances
- Let's Face It!, London production opened at the Hippodrome on November 19 and ran for 348 performances
- Priorities of 1942 Broadway Revue opened March 12 at the 46th Street Theatre and ran for 353 performances.
- Show Time Broadway Revue opened September 16 at the Broadhurst Theatre and ran for 342 performances.
- Star and Garter Broadway Revue opened on June 24 at the Music Box Theatre and ran for 605 performances.
- Stars on Ice Broadway Revue opened July 2 at the Center Theatre and ran for 827 performances.
- This Is the Army Broadway Revue opened July 4 at the Broadway Theatre and ran for 113 performances.

== Musical films ==
- Academia El Tango Argentino, starring Warly Ceriani.
- Almost Married, starring Jane Frazee, Robert Paige, Eugene Pallette and Elizabeth Patterson. Directed by Charles Lamont.
- Bala Nagamma, starring Kanchanamala.
- The Balloon Goes Up, starring Ethel Revnell, Gracie West, Donald Peers and Ronald Shiner. Directed by Redd Davis.
- Bambi
- Behind the Eight Ball, starring The Ritz Brothers, Carol Bruce, Dick Foran, Grace McDonald, Johnny Downs and William Demarest. Directed by Edward F. Cline.
- Bhakta Potana, starring V. Nagayya.
- Born To Sing, starring Virginia Weidler, Ray McDonald, Leo Gorcey and Rags Ragland. Directed by Edward Ludwig.
- Broadway, starring George Raft, Pat O'Brien, Janet Blair, Broderick Crawford and Marjorie Rambeau. Directed by William A. Seiter.
- Cairo, starring Jeanette MacDonald, Robert Young and Ethel Waters.
- The Fleet's In, starring Dorothy Lamour, William Holden, Eddie Bracken and Betty Hutton, and featuring Jimmy Dorsey & his Orchestra with vocals by Bob Eberly and Helen O'Connell.
- Footlight Serenade, starring Betty Grable and John Payne.
- For Me and My Gal, starring Judy Garland and Gene Kelly.
- Get Hep to Love, starring Gloria Jean, Donald O'Connor, Jane Frazee, Robert Paige, Peggy Ryan and Cora Sue Collins
- Give Out, Sisters, starring LaVerne Andrews, Patty Andrews, Maxene Andrews, Dan Dailey and Donald O'Connor
- I Married An Angel, starring Jeanette MacDonald, Nelson Eddy and Edward Everett Horton.
- Joan of Ozark, starring Judy Canova, Joe E. Brown and Eddie Foy Jr.
- King Arthur Was a Gentleman, starring Arthur Askey, Evelyn Dall and Anne Shelton
- Melodías de América, directed by Eduardo Morera
- Moonlight in Havana, starring Allan Jones and Jane Frazee
- My Favorite Spy, starring Kay Kyser & his Band, Ellen Drew and Jane Wyman. Directed by Tay Garnett.
- Orchestra Wives, starring Ann Rutherford, George Montgomery, and Glenn Miller.
- Panama Hattie, starring Red Skelton, Ann Sothern, Virginia O'Brien and Dan Dailey, and featuring Lena Horne.
- Priorities on Parade, starring Ann Miller, Johnnie Johnston, Jerry Colonna and Betty Jane Rhodes
- Rhythm Parade, starring Nils T. Grunland, Gale Storm, Robert Lowery, The Mills Brothers and Ted Fio Rito and his Orchestra. Directed by Dave Gould and Howard Bretherton.
- Ride 'Em Cowboy, starring Bud Abbott, Lou Costello and Dick Foran and featuring Ella Fitzgerald and The Merry Macs.
- Rio Rita, starring Bud Abbott, Lou Costello, Kathryn Grayson and John Carroll
- Road To Morocco, starring Bing Crosby, Bob Hope and Dorothy Lamour.
- Rose of Tralee, starring John Longden, Lesley Brook and Angela Glynne.
- Seven Days' Leave, starring Victor Mature, Lucille Ball and Buddy Clark and featuring Ginny Simms, Les Brown & his Orchestra and Freddy Martin & his Orchestra
- Ship Ahoy, starring Eleanor Powell and Red Skelton.
- Sleepytime Gal, released March 5, starring Judy Canova and Ruth Terry and featuring Skinnay Ennis & his Orchestra.
- Springtime in the Rockies, released November 6, starring Carmen Miranda, Betty Grable and John Payne and featuring Harry James and his Music and Six Hits and a Miss.
- Star Spangled Rhythm, starring Betty Hutton and Eddie Bracken, and featuring Bing Crosby, Bob Hope, Dorothy Lamour, Paulette Goddard, Veronica Lake, Mary Martin, Dick Powell and Vera Zorina.
- Strictly in the Groove, starring Mary Healy, Richard Davies and Leon Errol and featuring Martha Tilton, The Dinning Sisters and Ozzie Nelson & his Band
- Sweater Girl, released July 13, starring Eddie Bracken and June Preisser and featuring Betty Jane Rhodes.
- We'll Smile Again, starring Bud Flanagan, Chesney Allen and Meinhart Maur.
- Yankee Doodle Dandy, starring James Cagney, Joan Leslie, Irene Manning and Frances Langford.
- You Were Never Lovelier, starring Fred Astaire and Rita Hayworth.

== Births ==
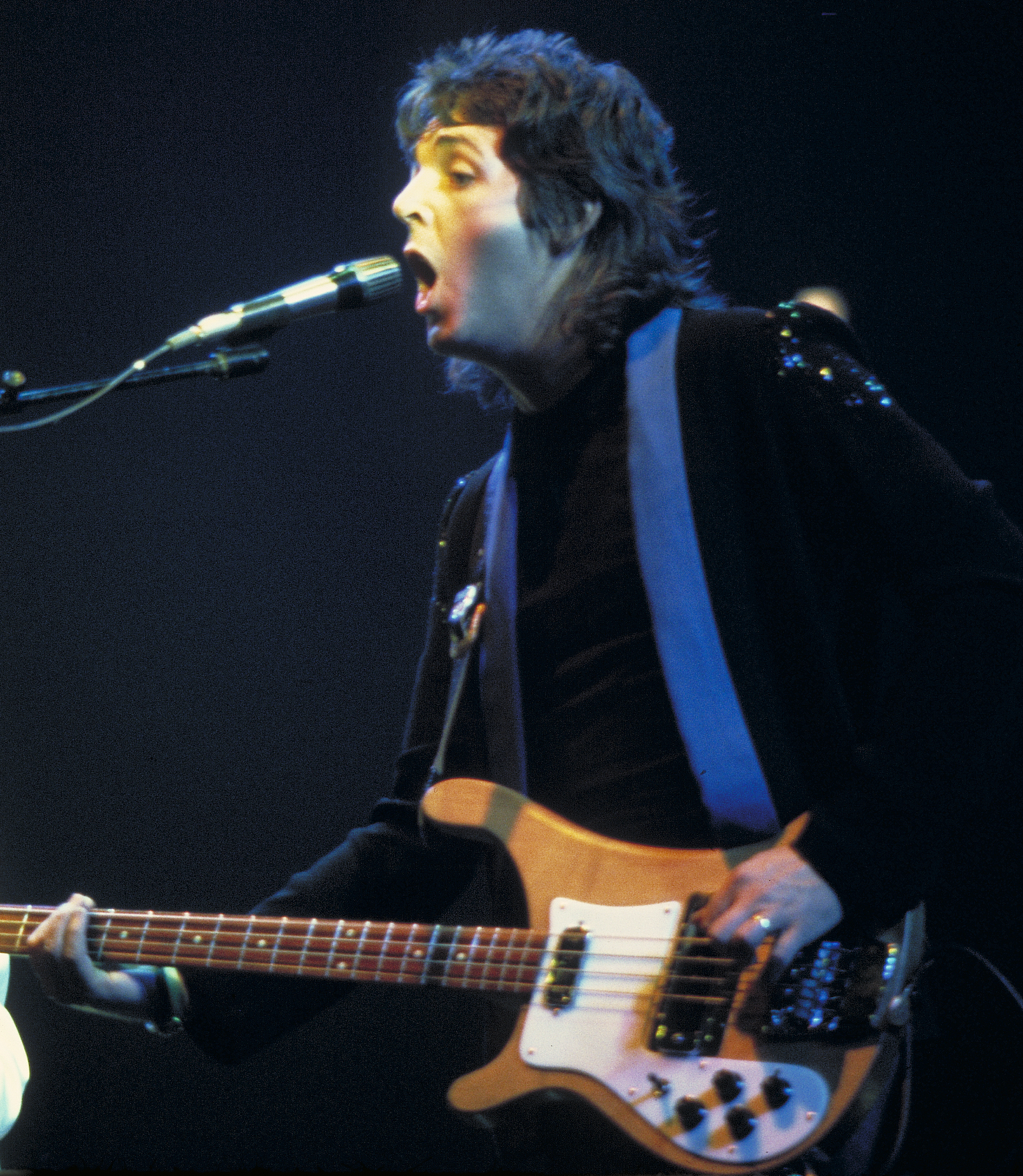
Paul McCartney

- January 1
  - F. R. David, French musician
  - Kornelije Kovač, Serbian composer
  - Country Joe McDonald, American psychedelic rock singer (The "Fish" Cheer/I-Feel-Like-I'm-Fixin'-to-Die Rag) (died 2026)
  - Judy Stone, Australian singer-songwriter
- January 4
  - Precious Bryant, American singer-songwriter and guitarist (died 2013)
  - John McLaughlin, English guitarist, bandleader and composer
- January 5 – Maurizio Pollini, Italian pianist (died 2024)
- January 8 – John Petersen, American drummer (The Beau Brummels, Harpers Bizarre) (died 2007)
- January 11 – Clarence Clemons, American saxophonist (died 2011)
- January 16 – Barbara Lynn, American R&B guitarist and singer
- January 18
  - Bobby Goldsboro, American singer-songwriter
  - Ruby Winters, American singer (died 2016)
- January 19
  - Michael Crawford, English actor, singer and entertainer
  - Nara Leão, Brazilian singer (died 1989)
- January 21 – Edwin Starr, American singer (died 2003)
- January 30 – Marty Balin, American vocalist (Jefferson Airplane) (died 2018)
- February 2 – Graham Nash, singer-songwriter (The Hollies; Crosby, Stills, Nash & Young)
- February 5 – Cory Wells, vocalist (Three Dog Night) (died 2015)
- February 8 – Terry Melcher, American singer-songwriter and producer (Bruce & Terry) (died 2004)
- February 9 – Carole King, singer-songwriter
- February 11 – Otis Clay, gospel/R&B-singer (died 2016)
- February 13 – Peter Tork, pop musician/actor (The Monkees) (died 2019)
- February 15 – Glyn Johns, recording engineer
- February 19 – Phil Coulter, folk musician and songwriter
- February 28 – Brian Jones, rock musician (The Rolling Stones) (died 1969)
- March 2
  - Lou Reed, singer-songwriter (died 2013)
  - Meir Ariel, Israeli musician (died 1999)
- March 3 – Mike Pender, vocalist (The Searchers)
- March 9 – Mark Lindsay, American vocalist (Paul Revere & the Raiders)
- March 13
  - Meic Stevens, singer-songwriter
  - Scatman John, American music artist, known for scat singing and dance music fusion (died 1999)
- March 15 – Jerry Jeff Walker, country singer (died 2020)
- March 20 – Robin Luke, rockabilly singer
- March 25 – Aretha Franklin, soul singer (died 2018)
- March 28 – Samuel Ramey, operatic bass
- April 1
  - Alan Blakely (The Tremeloes)
  - Phil Margo (The Tokens) (died 2021)
  - Danny Brooks (The Dovells)
- April 2
  - Phil Castrodale (The Reflections)
  - Leon Russell, singer-songwriter, pianist and guitarist (died 2016)
- April 3
  - Wayne Newton, singer
  - Billy Joe Royal, singer (died 2015)
- April 4 – Major Lance, R&B singer (died 1994)
- April 5 – Allan Clarke, singer (The Hollies)
- April 8 – Roger Chapman, vocalist (Family)
- April 18 – Mike Vickers (Manfred Mann)
- April 19 – Alan Price, singer-songwriter and keyboard player
- April 24 – Barbra Streisand, US singer and actress
- April 26 – Bobby Rydell, US singer and sometime actor (died 2022)
- April 27 – Jim Keltner, US rock session drummer
- April 29 – Vini Poncia, songwriter (Tradewinds)
- May 1 – Charlie Allen, singer-songwriter (died 1990)
- May 3 – Yuliya Abakumovskaya, Russian mezzo-soprano
- May 4
  - Nick Ashford (Ashford & Simpson) (died 2011)
  - Enrique Bátiz, Mexican conductor and pianist (died 2025)
- May 5 – Tammy Wynette, country singer (died 1998)
- May 6 – Colin Earl (Mungo Jerry)
- May 9 – Tommy Roe, singer
- May 12
  - Ian Dury, singer-songwriter (died 2000)
  - Billy Swan, singer and songwriter
- May 15 – K.T. Oslin, American country singer-songwriter (d. 2020)
- May 18 – Albert Hammond, singer-songwriter
- May 20 – Jill Jackson ("Paula"), singer
- May 23 – Fred Wedlock, folk singer (died 2010)
- May 26 – Ray Ennis (The Swinging Blue Jeans)
- June 3 – Curtis Mayfield, singer, songwriter and record producer (died 1999)
- June 6 – Paul Esswood, countertenor
- June 8 – Chuck Negron, rock singer-songwriter (Three Dog Night)
- June 12 – Len Barry, singer (died 2020)
- June 15 – Birgitte Alsted, Danish violinist, teacher and composer
- June 16 – Edward Levert, R&B singer (O'Jays)
- June 18
  - Paul McCartney, singer-songwriter and composer
  - Hans Vonk, Dutch conductor (died 2004)
- June 19
  - Elaine "Spanky" McFarlane (Spanky and Our Gang)
  - Ralna English, American singer
- June 20 – Brian Wilson, American pop singer-songwriter and producer (The Beach Boys) (died 2025)
- June 27 – Bruce Johnston, American pop singer-songwriter, keyboardist and bassist (The Beach Boys)
- June 28 – David Miner (The Great Society), musician and record producer
- July 4 – Peter Rowan, American singer-songwriter and guitarist (Earth Opera) (Old & In the Way)
- July 5 – Matthias Bamert, conductor
- July 10 – Sixto Rodriguez, folk rock singer-songwriter (died 2023)
- July 11 – Tomasz Stańko, free jazz trumpeter (died 2018)
- July 12
  - Swamp Dogg, soul singer
  - Steve Young, country singer (died 2016)
- July 13
  - >Stephen Jo Bladd (The J. Geils Band)
  - Roger McGuinn (The Byrds)
  - Jay Uzzell (The Corsairs)
- July 18 – Bobby Susser, American songwriter and producer (died 2020)
- July 25 – Bruce Woodly (The Seekers)
- July 27 – Kim Fowley, record producer and songwriter (died 2015)
- August 1 – Jerry Garcia, guitarist (Grateful Dead) (died 1995)
- August 5 – Rick Huxley, pop bass guitarist (The Dave Clark Five) (died 2013)
- August 7
  - B. J. Thomas, singer (died 2021)
  - Caetano Veloso, Brazilian singer/songwriter
- August 8 – Jay David (Dr. Hook & the Medicine Show)
- August 9 – Jack DeJohnette (New Directions) (died 2025)
- August 11 – Guy Villari (The Regents)
- August 16 – Barbara George, R&B singer-songwriter (died 2006)
- August 20 – Isaac Hayes, soul and funk musician (died 2008)
- August 22 – Joseph Chambers (The Chambers Brothers)
- August 25 – Walter Williams (O'Jays)
- August 27
  - Daryl Dragon (The Captain & Tennille) (died 2019)
  - Chip Douglas - American musician
- August 29 – Sterling Morrison (The Velvet Underground) (died 1995)
- September 3 – Al Jardine, American musician (The Beach Boys)
- September 4 – Merald "Bubba" Knight, American R&B and soul singer (Gladys Knight and the Pips)
- September 8 – Sal Valentino, American rock musician (The Beau Brummels)
- September 10 – Danny Hutton, Irish-born American singer (Three Dog Night)
- September 15 – Lee Dorman, American bassist (died 2012)
- September 16 – Bernie Calvert, English musician (The Hollies)
- September 19
  - Danny Kalb, American blues guitarist (Blues Project)
  - Freda Payne, American singer and actress
- September 20 – Jürgen Hart, German cabaret performer (died 2002)
- September 21
  - Jill Gomez, Guyanese-born British soprano (died 2026)
  - U-Roy, born Ewart Beckford, reggae musician, pioneer of toasting (Jamaican music) (died 2021)
- September 24
  - Phyllis Allbut, American pop singer (The Angels)
  - Ilkka "Danny" Lipsanen, Finnish singer
  - Gerry Marsden, English singer-songwriter (Gerry & the Pacemakers) and actor (died 2021)
- September 27 – Alvin Stardust, English singer (died 2014)
- September 28
  - Tim Maia, Brazilian singer and songwriter (died 1998)
  - Anatol Ugorski, Russian-born German pianist (died 2023)
- September 29 – Jean-Luc Ponty, French violinist
- September 30
  - Gus Dudgeon, English record producer (died 2002)
  - Mike Harrison, English musician (Spooky Tooth) (died 2018)
  - Frankie Lymon, American singer (died 1968)
- October 5
  - Billy Scott, American singer-songwriter (died 2012)
  - Richard Street (The Temptations) (died 2013)
- October 12
  - Melvin Franklin (The Temptations) (died 1995)
  - Daliah Lavi, Israeli actress and singer (died 2017)
- October 17 – Gary Puckett, singer
- October 21 – Elvin Bishop, guitarist
- October 22
  - Annette Funicello, singer and actress (died 2013)
  - Bobby Fuller (The Bobby Fuller Four) (died 1966)
- October 24 – Don Gant, singer/songwriter, record producer (died 1987)
- October 26 – Milton Nascimento, Brazilian singer/songwriter
- October 27 – Lee Greenwood, country singer-songwriter
- November 5 – Pierangelo Bertoli, Italian singer-songwriter (died 2002)
- November 7 – Johnny Rivers, singer, songwriter, guitarist and record producer
- November 8 – J. J. Jackson, singer and songwriter
- November 13
  - John P. Hammond, blues singer and guitarist
  - Roger Lee Hall, composer and musicologist
- November 15 – Daniel Barenboim, pianist and conductor
- November 17 – Bob Gaudio (The Four Seasons)
- November 20
  - Norman Greenbaum, singer
  - Meredith Monk, composer
- November 27 – Jimi Hendrix, rock guitarist (died 1970)
- December 7 – Harry Chapin, singer-songwriter (died 1981)
- December 8 - Toots Hibbert, reggae singer-songwriter (Toots and the Maytals) (died 2020)
- December 13 – Neil Aspinall, road manager for The Beatles (died 2008)
- December 17 – Paul Butterfield, blues musician and singer (died 1987)
- December 29
  - Dinah Christie, English-born Canadian actress and singer
  - Jerry Summers, American doo-wop singer (The Dovells)
- December 30 – Michael Nesmith, pop singer-songwriter (The Monkees) (died 2021)
- December 31 – Andy Summers, guitarist (The Police), (Eric Burdon & the Animals)

== Deaths ==
- January 1 – Jaroslav Ježek, composer, 35 (kidney disease)
- January 2 – Henriette Gottlieb, operatic soprano, 57
- January 4 – Leon Jessel, composer, 70
- January 14
  - Harry Champion, music hall composer, 76
  - Fred Fisher, songwriter, 66
- February 15 – Stanislav Binički, Serbian composer, conductor and music teacher, 69
- February 22
  - Vera Timanova, Russian pianist, 87
  - Stefan Zweig, Jewish librettist of Richard Strauss, 60
- February 25
  - Leo Ascher, composer and songwriter, 61
  - Sidney D. Mitchell, composer and songwriter, 53
- March 2 – Charlie Christian, jazz guitarist, 25 (tuberculosis)
- March 11 – Reginald Stoneham songwriter and composer
- March 15 – Alexander von Zemlinsky, conductor and composer, 70
- March 20 – Aksel Agerby, composer, organist, and music administrator, 52
- April 3 – Paul Gilson, composer, 76
- April 6 – Lee Orean Smith, composer, arranger, music editor, publisher, music teacher, multi-instrumentalist, and conductor, 67
- April 11 – Frederick Hobbs, singer, actor and theatre manager, 61
- April 27 – Emil von Sauer, pianist and composer, 79
- May 7 – Felix Weingartner, editor and conductor, (born 1863)
- May 14 – Frank Churchill, US composer, 40 (suicide)
- May 15 – T-Bone Slim, poet and songwriter (born 1880)
- May 26 – Libero Bovio, Neapolitan lyricist, 68
- June 1 – Ernest Pingoud, composer, 54
- June 2 – Bunny Berigan, jazz trumpeter, 33 (hemorrhage)
- June 12
  - Ernst Heuser, composer, 79
  - Walter Leigh, composer, 36 (killed in action)
- June 17 – Jessie Bond, singer and actress in Gilbert & Sullivan, 89
- June 18
  - Arthur Pryor, trombonist and bandleader, 71
  - Daniel Alomía Robles, Peruvian composer and musicologist, 71
- July 30
  - Jimmy Blanton, jazz double-bassist, 23 (tuberculosis)
  - Dorothy Silk, soprano, 59
- August 12 – Pasquale Amato, operatic baritone, 64
- August 18 – Erwin Schulhoff, pianist and composer, 48 (tuberculosis)
- August 22 – Michel Fokine, dancer and choreographer, 62
- August 28 – Caleb Simper, organist and composer, 85
- September 9 – William Murdoch, arranger and pianist (born 1888)
- October 7 – Norman Gale, lyricist and writer (born 1862)
- October 15 – Dame Marie Tempest, opera and musical comedy singer, 78
- October 23 – Ralph Rainger, US composer and pianist, 41 (air crash)
- November 1 – Hugo Distler, composer, 34 (suicide)
- November 5 – George M. Cohan, songwriter and music hall star, 64
- November 24 – Peadar Kearney, lyricist of the Irish national anthem, 58
- November 25 – Frederick E. Hahn, violinist, composer, and music educator, 73
- December 3 – Wilhelm Peterson-Berger, Swedish composer (born 1867)
- December 18 – António D'Andrade, opera singer, 88
- December 20 – Jean Gilbert, composer and conductor, 63
- December 21 – Francis Bousquet, French composer of classical music, 52
- December 23 – Konstantin Balmont, dedicatee and lyricist, 75
- December 25 – George L. Cobb, ragtime composer, 56
