= The Seven Doors of Danny =

Song cycle

The Seven Doors of Danny is a song cycle composed by Sussex-born composer Ricky Horscraft (born 1973) in collaboration with Brighton-based poet John McCullough (born 1978). Its storyline is based on Shakespeare's Seven Ages of Man (from As You Like It) and is composed for male soloists with male chorus and chamber orchestra. It was premiered on 2 April 2016 in Hove by members respectively of Actually Gay Men's Chorus (AGMC) and University of Sussex Symphony Orchestra (USSO).

The work comprises seven songs in diverse styles, telling the story of the title character in chronological sequence and each song is to be sung ideally by a performer approximate in age to the character at that point in the story. Each song is introduced by a short narrative verse delivered by the narrator who may also be a performer in the chorus.

The seven songs are:

- Go!
- Wire
- Fingerprints
- Jobbing for the Devil
- The Locksmith
- Lift
- Go! (Part Two)

The title character's name was chosen due to the urban setting of the work.

During 2017 the creators worked with a mutual friend to expand the work further, fleshing out the storyline with dialogue, drama and additional music. This new musical theatre edition of the work was premiered at the 2018 B Right On Festival in Brighton and Hove, in conjunction with the Brighton and Hove Lesbian and Gay Community Safety Forum, again with members of AGMC and USSO in the chorus and orchestra, plus a number of guests. In the expanded version, the villain of the piece, drag queen racketeer "Tequila Heels", appearing opposite Danny no. 4, has been given her own song, "Suck It Up". The premiere, like its predecessor, was very well received.
