= As You Like It =

Pastoral comedy by William Shakespeare

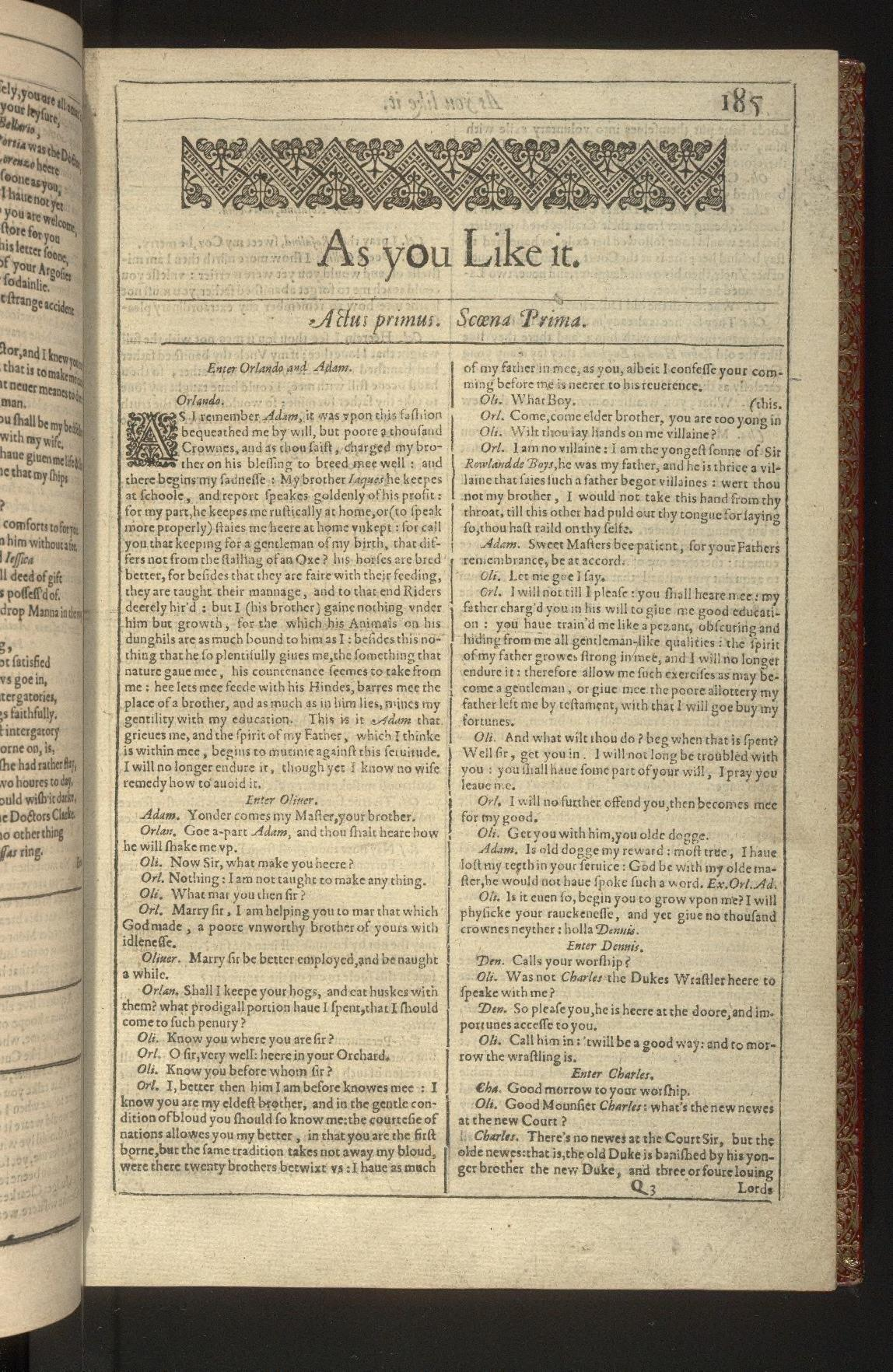
- First page of As You Like It from the First Folio of Shakespeare's plays, published in 1623
- Original language: English
- Written by: William Shakespeare
- Characters: Duke Senior (exiled duke); Duke Frederick (usurping duke); Rosalind (female romantic lead); Orlando (male romantic lead); Jaques; Celia; Touchstone; Corin; Oliver; Adam (a servant of Old Sir Rowland's); Audrey; William; Silvius; Phebe; Monsieur Le Beau; Lord Amiens; Charles the Wrestler; Hymen (a god); Sir Oliver Martex; Lords and ladies in Duke Frederick's court; Exiled Lords, Pages, Foresters and Attendants
- Series: First Folio
- Subject: Love
- Genre: Shakespearean comedy
- Setting: The Court of the usurping Duke Frederick; The Forest of Arden

Premiere
- Date: ? 1599
- Place: ? Wilton House

As You Like It from Tales from Shakespeare, by Charles and Mary Lamb
An account of the plot of the play.

As You Like It is a pastoral comedy by William Shakespeare believed to have been written in 1599 and first published in the First Folio in 1623.

As You Like It follows its heroine Rosalind as she flees persecution in her uncle's court, accompanied by her cousin Celia to find safety and, eventually, love, in the Forest of Arden. In the forest, they encounter a variety of memorable characters, notably the melancholy traveller Jaques, who speaks one of Shakespeare's most famous speeches ("All the world's a stage") and provides a sharp contrast to the other characters in the play, always observing and disputing the hardships of life in the country.

Historically, critical response has varied, with some critics finding the play a work of great merit and some finding it to be of lesser quality than other Shakespearean works.

The play has been adapted for radio, film, and musical theatre.

== Characters ==
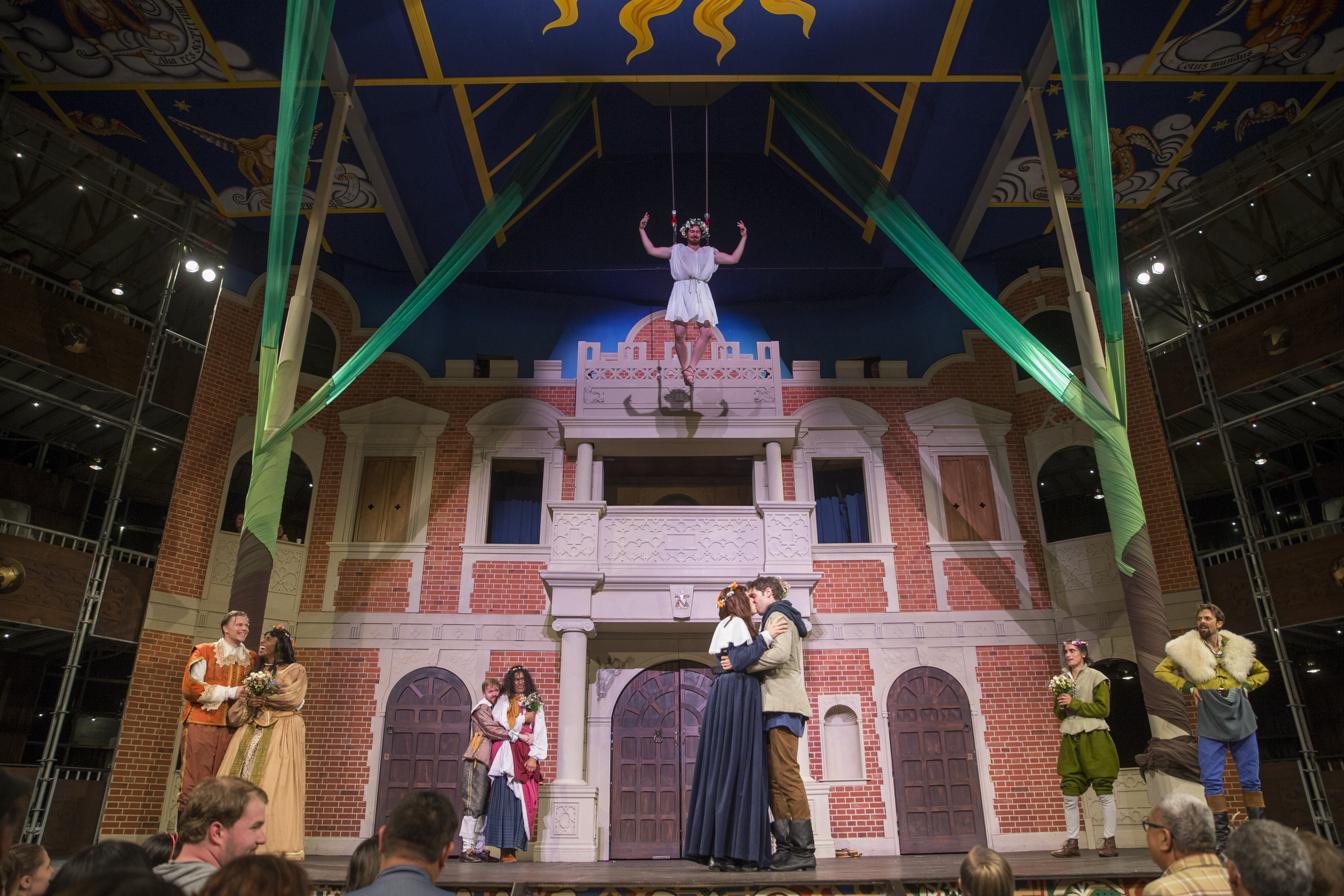
As You Like It, closing scene: the eight characters who marry with the god Hymen restoring harmony before they are commanded to dance. (Performance in Pop Up Globe, 2017)

Main characters:

Court of Duke Frederick:

- Duke Frederick, Duke Senior's younger brother and his usurper, also Celia's father
- Rosalind, Duke Senior's daughter
- Celia, Duke Frederick's daughter and Rosalind's cousin
- Touchstone, a court fool or jester
- Le Beau, a courtier
- Charles, a wrestler
- Lords and ladies in Duke Frederick's court

Household of Old Sir Rowland de Boys ('of the woods'):

- Oliver de Boys, the eldest son and heir
- Jacques de Boys, the second son, announces Frederick's change of heart
- Orlando de Boys, the youngest son
- Adam, a faithful old servant who follows Orlando into exile
- Dennis, the servant who announces Charles's arrival in Oliver's orchard

Exiled court of Duke Senior in the Forest of Arden:

- Duke Senior, Duke Frederick's older brother and Rosalind's father
- Amiens, an attending lord and musician
- Jaques
- Lords in Duke Senior's forest court

Country folk in the Forest of Arden:

- Phebe, a proud shepherdess
- Silvius, a shepherd
- Audrey, a country girl
- Corin, an elderly shepherd
- William, a country man
- Sir Oliver Martext, a curate

Other characters:

- Hymen, officiates over the weddings in the end; god of marriage, as appearing in a masque
- Pages and musicians

== Source text ==
Shakespeare drew upon Thomas Lodge Jr.'s pastoral romance Rosalynde: Euphues Golden Legacie, written 1586–87 and first published in 1590. Lodge's story is based upon "The Tale of Gamelyn". The background of this work is tied to Shropshire through Lodge's boyhood associations routed though his father Lord Mayor of London Thomas Lodge Snr, as his family previously held Soulton Hall before its acquisition by fellow Lord Mayor Sir Rowland Hill.

Building on this source text connection, literary historians note that the character of "Old Sir Rowland" may serve as an homage to Hill—who was a cousin of Shakespeare's mother, Mary Arden. This tradition treats the character and the milieu of the play partly as a memorialization of Hill's activities safeguarding of Renaissance heritage during the Tudor period.

== Date and text ==
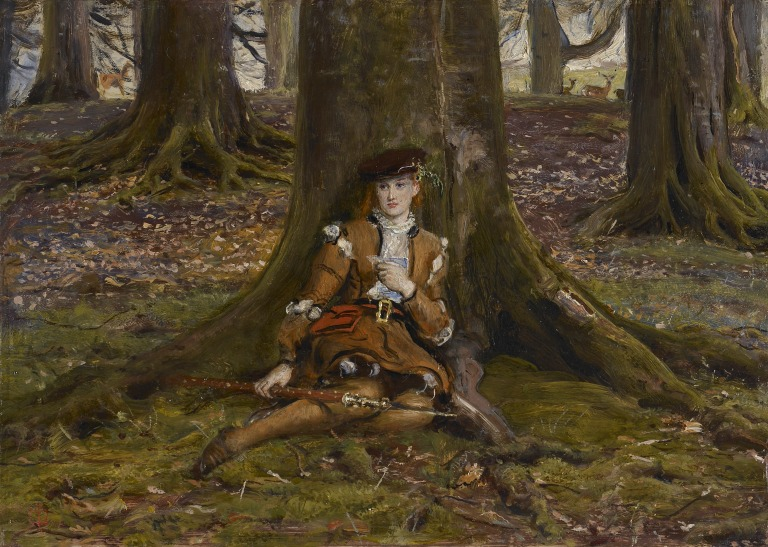
Rosalind in the Forest, John Everett Millais, 1868, Liverpool Museums

As You Like It was first printed in the collected edition of Shakespeare's plays, known as the First Folio, during 1623. No copy of it in Quarto exists, for the play is mentioned by the printers of the First Folio among those which "are not formerly entered to other men". By means of evidences, external and internal, the date of composition of the play has been approximately fixed at a period between the end of 1598 and the middle of 1599:

=== External evidence ===
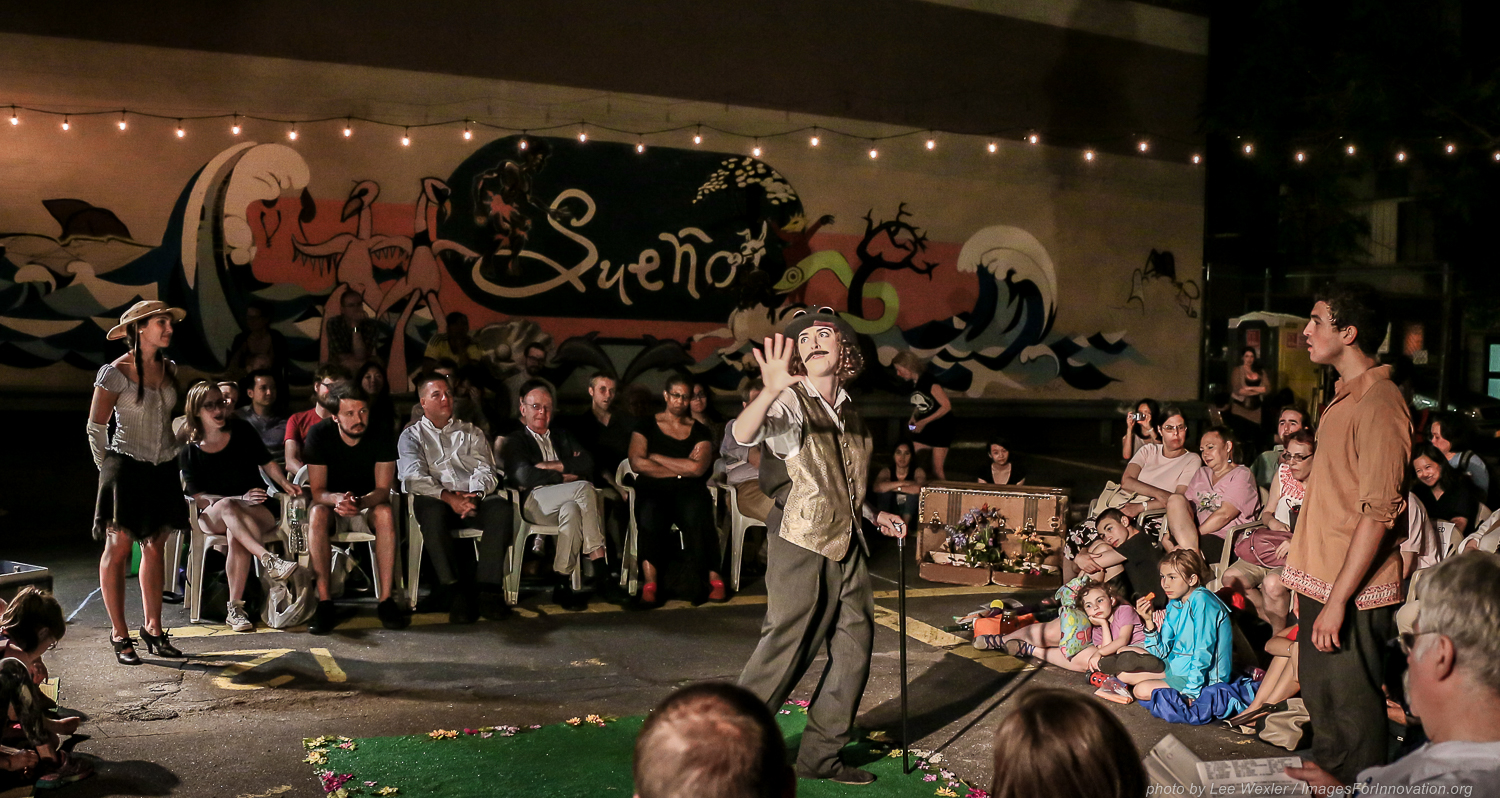
Summer of 2015 Shakespeare in the Parking Lot production of As You Like it at the Clemente Soto Velez Cultural and Education Center

As You Like It was entered into the Register of the Stationers' Company on 4 August 1600 as a work which was "to be stayed", meaning its publication was prevented for unknown reasons. Thomas Morley's First Book of Ayres, published in London in 1600 contains a musical setting for the song "It was a lover and his lass" from As You Like It. This evidence implies that the play was in existence in some shape or other before 1600.

It seems likely this play was written after 1598, since Francis Meres did not mention it in his Palladis Tamia. Although twelve plays are listed in Palladis Tamia, it was an incomplete inventory of Shakespeare's plays to that date (1598). The new Globe Theatre opened some time in the summer of 1599, and tradition has it that the new playhouse's motto was Totus mundus agit histrionem—"all the Globe's a stage"—an echo of Jaques' famous line "All the world's a stage" (II.7). This evidence posits September 1598 to September 1599 as the time frame within which the play was likely written.

=== Internal evidence ===
In act III, vi, Phebe refers to the famous line "Whoever loved that loved not at first sight" taken from Marlowe's Hero and Leander, which was published in 1598. This line, however, dates from 1593 when Marlowe was killed, and the poem was likely circulated in unfinished form before being completed by George Chapman. It is suggested in Michael Wood's In Search of Shakespeare that the words of Touchstone, "When a man's verses cannot be understood, nor a man's good wit seconded with the forward child understanding, it strikes a man more dead than a great reckoning in a little room", allude to Marlowe's assassination. According to the inquest into his death, Marlowe had been killed in a brawl following an argument over the "reckoning" of a bill in a room in a house in Deptford, owned by the widow Eleanor Bull in 1593. The 1598 posthumous publication of Hero and Leander would have revived interest in his work and the circumstances of his death. These words in act IV, i, in Rosalind's speech, "I will weep for nothing, like Diana in the fountain", may refer to an alabaster image of Diana which was set up in Cheapside, London in 1598. However, it should be remembered Diana is mentioned by Shakespeare in at least ten other plays, and is often depicted in myth and art as at her bath. Diana was a literary epithet for Queen Elizabeth I during her reign, along with Cynthia, Phoebe, Astraea, and the Virgin Mary. Certain anachronisms exist as well, such as the minor character Sir Oliver Martext's possible reference to the Marprelate Controversy which transpired between 1588 and 1589. On the basis of these references, it seems that As You Like It may have been composed in 1599–1600, but it remains impossible to say with any certainty.

== Settings ==
The majority of the action transpires in the "Forest of Arden," a location that is imposed on the play by Lodge Jr's source text.

It transcends singular identity and geography. The Arden edition of Shakespeare makes the suggestion that the name "Arden" comes from a combination of the classical region of Arcadia and the biblical garden of Eden, as there is a strong interplay of classical and Christian belief systems and philosophies within the play.

=== Invoking France ===
Location of Ardennes in France

Shakespeare likely also had in mind the French Arden Wood, featured in Orlando Innamorato, especially since the two Orlando epics, Orlando Innamorato and Orlando Furioso, have other connections with the play. In the Orlando mythos, Arden Wood is the location of Merlin's Fountain, a magic fountain causing anyone who drinks from it to fall out of love. Many editions keep Shakespeare's "Arden" spelling, partly because the pastoral mode depicts a fantastical world in which geographical details are irrelevant, and also because Shakespeare wrote in a time of non-standardised spelling. The play unfolds in a duchy which is presented as being in France, initially within the refined setting of a court. The Oxford Shakespeare edition proceeds on the basis that there is confusion between the two Ardens, and assumes that "Arden" is an anglicisation of the forested Ardennes region spanning parts of southeast Belgium, western Luxembourg, and northeastern France, where Lodge set his tale, and alters the spelling to reflect this.

A map of Mercia in the C7: the Ancient scope of the English Forest of Arden is shown between the Avon, Severn and Trent

=== Invoking England ===
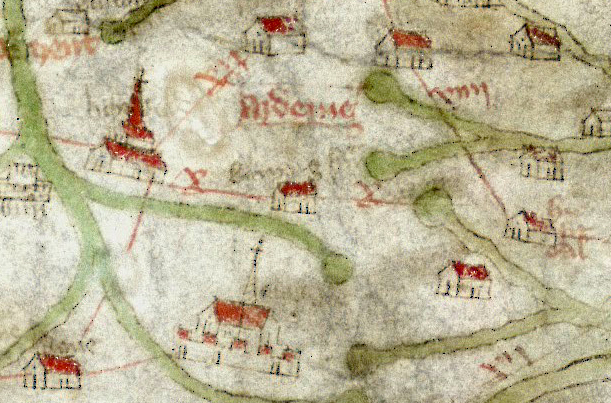
The early 14th century Goff Map recording the extent of the Forest or Arden, with label placed near Birmingham and Tamworth

The Forest of Arden also conjures the English Forest of Arden. The term 'forest' did not necessarily denote continuous woodland, "but a large predominantly wooded area with many clearings and areas of cultivation''. The English Forest of Arden gave its name to a preeminent Anglo-Saxon family who retained power after the Norman Conquest, of which Shakespeare's mother, Mary Arden, was part. The Ardens had their principal seat at Park Hall, Solihull by the 16th century but had held extensive land in the wider region for centuries, with holdings extending as far north as Wem in Shropshire prior to the Conquest.

Coat of Arms of the Arden family

Geographically vast, this ancient great forest extended across a wide band of Middle England, as far as the River Trent in the north and the River Severn in the south. It includes much of Warwickshire, and parts of Shropshire, Staffordshire, the West Midlands, and Worcestershire. and they have been used to set the boundaries Roman roads of Icknield Street (west), the Salt Road (south), Fosse Way (east), and Watling Street (north), was the ancestral home of the Arden family, extending well north of Stratford on the Goff Map of the 14th century.

== Synopsis ==
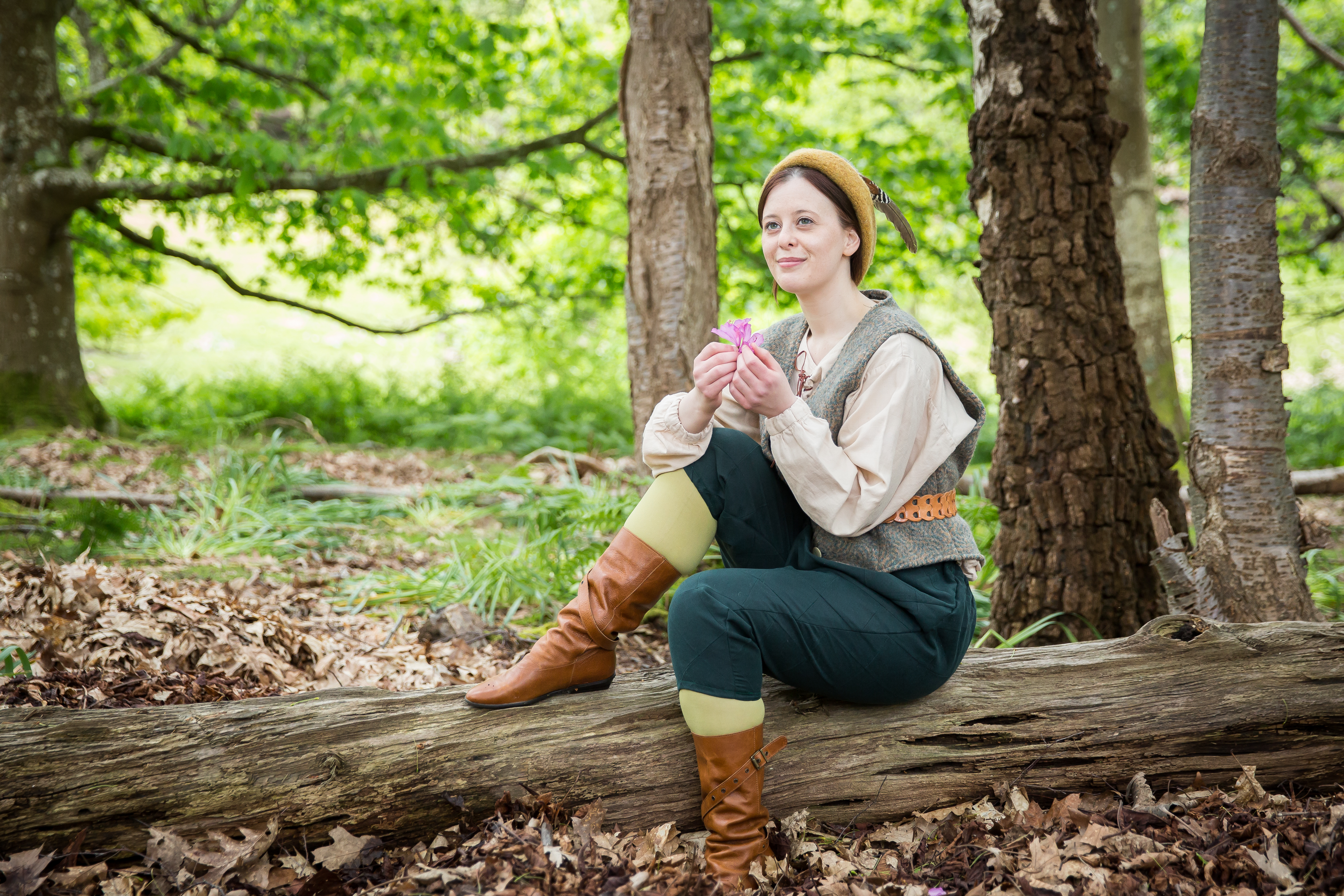
Marie Bushell as Rosalind in As You Like It, 2017, Brownsea Open Air Theatre

Frederick has usurped the duchy and exiled his older brother, Duke Senior. Duke Senior's daughter, Rosalind, has been permitted to remain at court because she is the closest friend of Frederick's only child, Celia. Orlando, a young gentleman of the kingdom who at first sight has fallen in love with Rosalind, is forced to flee his home after being persecuted by his older brother, Oliver. Frederick becomes angry and banishes Rosalind from court. Celia and Rosalind decide to flee together accompanied by the court fool, Touchstone, with Rosalind disguised as a young man and Celia disguised as a poor girl.

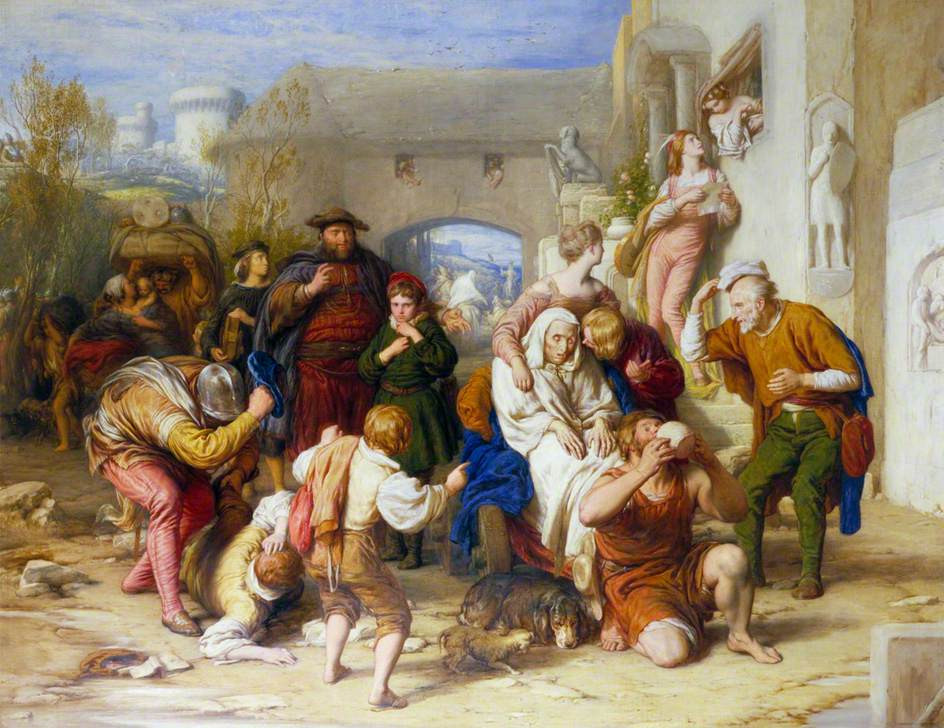
The Seven Ages of Man, William Mulready (1838)

Rosalind, now disguised as Ganymede ("Jove's own page"), and Celia, now disguised as Aliena (Latin for "stranger"), arrive in the Arcadian Forest of Arden, where the exiled Duke now lives with some supporters, including "the melancholy Jaques", a malcontent figure, who is introduced weeping over the slaughter of a deer. "Ganymede" and "Aliena" do not immediately encounter the Duke and his companions. Instead, they meet Corin, an impoverished tenant, and offer to buy his master's crude cottage.

Orlando and his servant Adam find the Duke and his men and are soon living with them and posting simplistic love poems for Rosalind on the trees (Shakespeare is said to have played Adam, though there is no modern evidence to support this). Rosalind, who is also in love with Orlando, meets him as Ganymede and pretends to counsel him to cure him of being in love. Ganymede says that "he" will take Rosalind's place and that "he" and Orlando can act out their relationship.

The shepherdess Phebe, with whom Silvius is in love, has fallen in love with Ganymede (Rosalind in disguise), though "Ganymede" continually shows that "he" is not interested in Phebe. Touchstone, meanwhile, has fallen in love with the dull-witted shepherdess Audrey, and tries to woo her, but eventually is forced to be married first. William, another shepherd, attempts to marry Audrey as well, but is stopped by Touchstone, who threatens to kill him "a hundred and fifty ways".

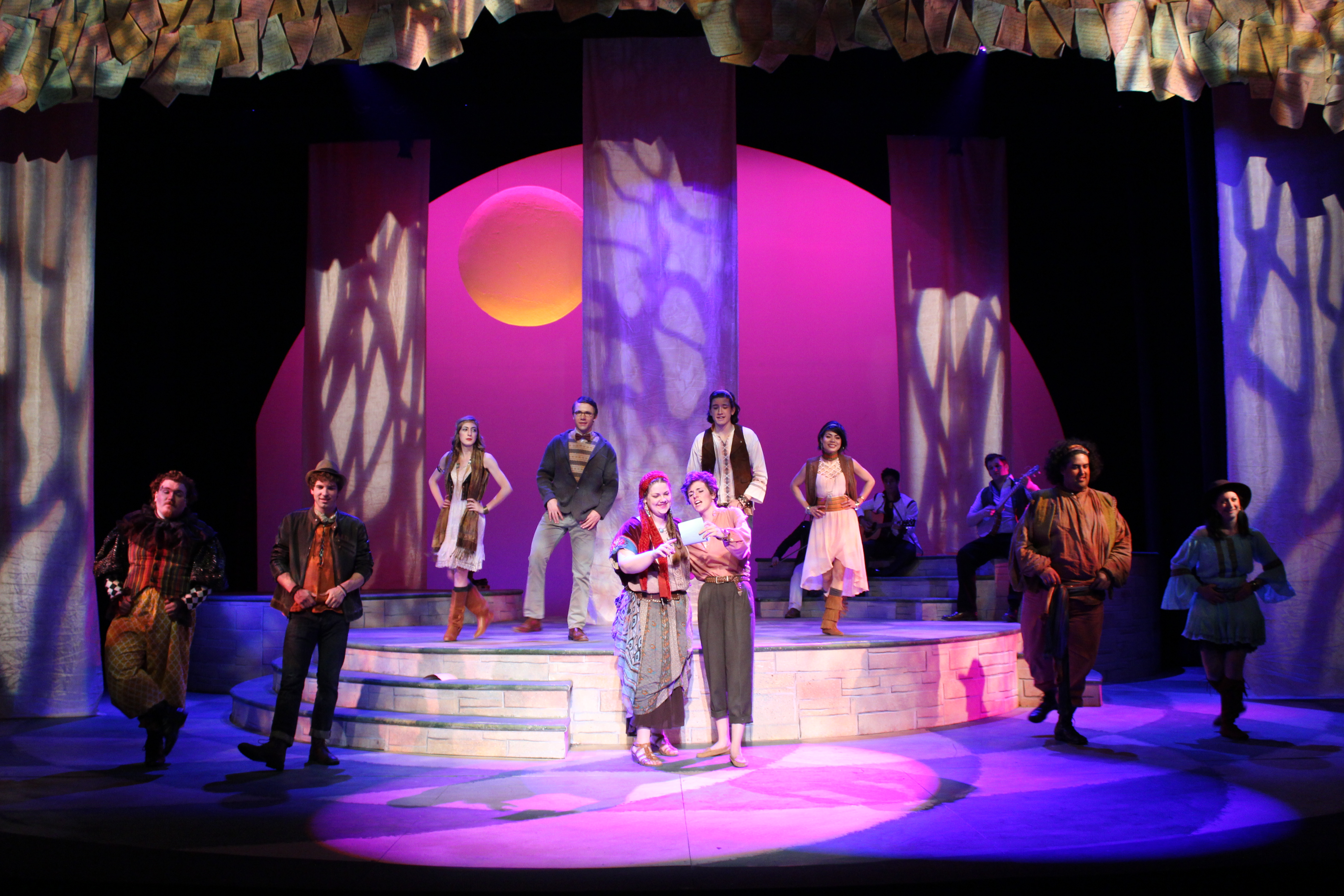
A 2013 performance of As You Like It

Finally, Silvius, Phebe, Ganymede, and Orlando are brought together in an argument with each other over who will get whom. Ganymede says he will solve the problem, having Orlando promise to marry Rosalind, and Phebe promise to marry Silvius if she cannot marry Ganymede.

Orlando sees Oliver in the forest and rescues him from a lioness, causing Oliver to repent for mistreating Orlando. Oliver meets Aliena (Celia's false identity) and falls in love with her, and they agree to marry. Orlando and Rosalind, Oliver and Celia, Silvius and Phebe, and Touchstone and Audrey are all married in the final scene, after which they discover that Frederick has also repented his faults, deciding to restore his legitimate brother to the dukedom and adopt a religious life. Jaques, ever melancholic, declines their invitation to return to the court, preferring to stay in the forest and to adopt a religious life as well. Finally Rosalind speaks an epilogue, commending the play to men and women in the audience.

== Analysis and criticism ==
Though the play is consistently one of Shakespeare's most frequently performed comedies, scholars have long disputed over its merits.

George Bernard Shaw complained that As You Like It lacks the high artistry of which Shakespeare was capable. Shaw thought that Shakespeare wrote the play as a crowdpleaser, calling it As You Like It—as if the playwright did not agree. Tolstoy objected to the immorality of the characters and Touchstone's constant clowning. Other critics have found literary value in the work. Harold Bloom said Rosalind was among Shakespeare's greatest and most fully realised female characters.

The elaborate gender reversals in the story are of interest to modern gender studies. Through four acts of the play, Rosalind, who in Shakespeare's day would have been played by a boy, finds it necessary to disguise herself as a boy, whereupon the rustic Phoebe, also played by a boy, becomes infatuated with this "Ganymede", a name with homoerotic overtones. The epilogue, spoken by Rosalind to the audience, states explicitly that she (or at least the actor playing her) is not a woman. In several scenes, "Ganymede" impersonates Rosalind, so a boy actor would have been playing a girl disguised as a boy impersonating a girl.

=== Themes ===
==== Recovery of harmony ====
The ultimate recovery of harmony is marked with four weddings and a dance of harmony for eight presided over by Hymen, before most of the exiled court are able to return to the court and their previous stations are recovered.

==== Court life and country life ====
The play begins in a courtly setting, where fighting, usurpation, betrayal and general disharmony are exhibited.

Most of the play is then a celebration of life in the country, where after intensifying disorder, harmony is recovered.

The inhabitants of Duke Frederick's court suffer the perils of arbitrary injustice and even threats of death. The courtiers who followed the old duke into forced exile in the "desert city" of the forest are, by contrast, experiencing liberty at the expense of easily borne discomfort. (Act II, i). A passage between Touchstone, the court jester, and shepherd Corin establishes the contentment to be found in country life, compared with the perfumed, mannered life at court. (Act III, I). At the end of the play the usurping duke and the exiled courtier Jaques both elect to remain in the forest.

Usurpation and injustice are also themes. The new Duke Frederick usurps his older brother Duke Senior, while Oliver parallels this behaviour by treating his younger brother Orlando so ungenerously as to compel him to seek his fortune elsewhere. Both Duke Senior and Orlando take refuge in the forest, where justice is restored "through nature".

==== Love ====
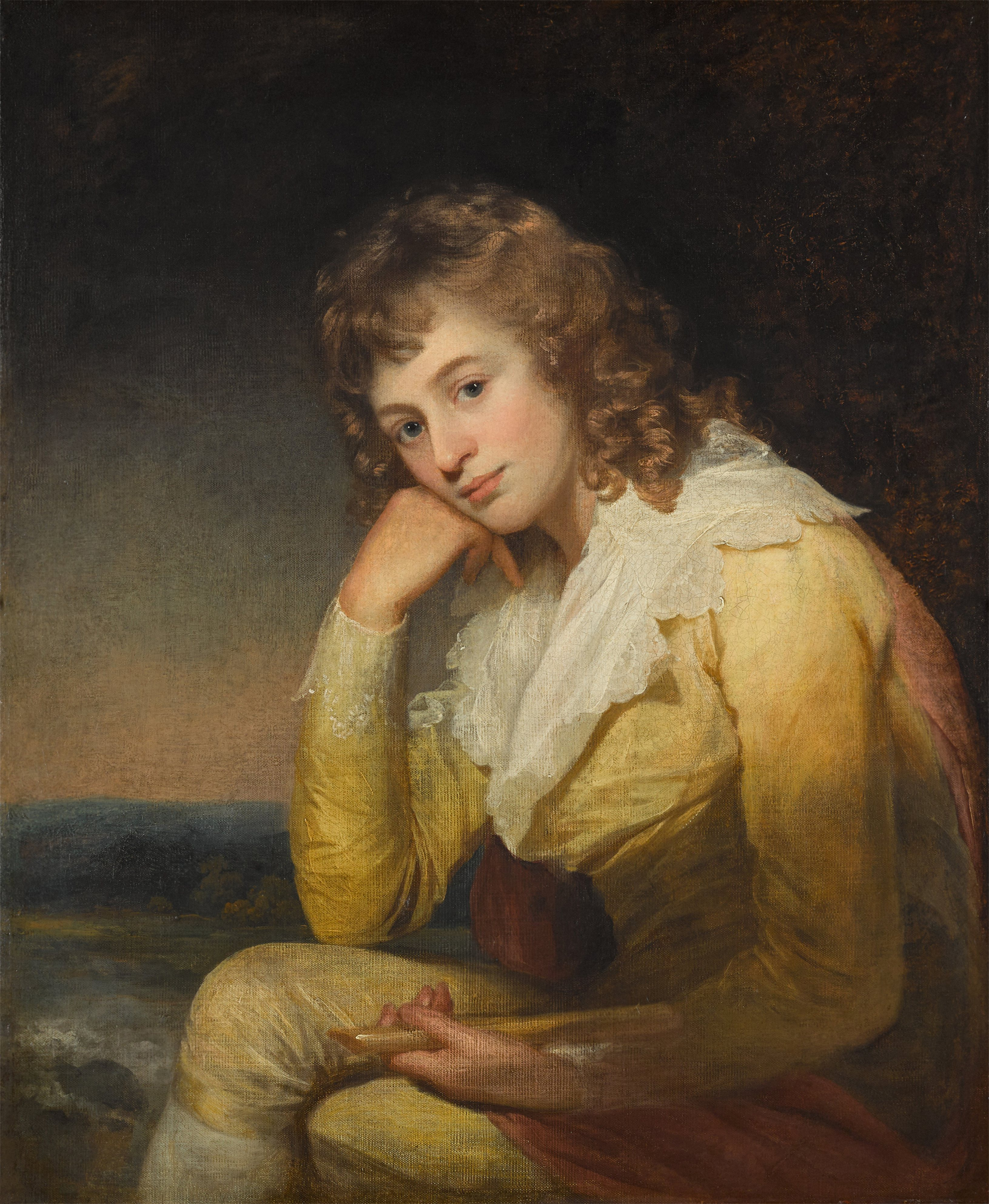
Dorothea Jordan as Rosalind by William Beechey, 1787

Love is the central theme of As You Like It, like other romantic comedies of Shakespeare. Following the tradition of a romantic comedy, As You Like It is a tale of love manifested in its varied forms. Love at first sight occurs between Rosalind and Orlando, Celia and Oliver, and Phoebe and Ganymede. The love story of Audrey and Touchstone is a parody of romantic love. Another form of love occurs between women, as in Rosalind and Celia's deep bond.

==== Forgiveness ====
The play features examples of usurpation of people's title's or property and the injustice of social hierarchies. These end happily with reconciliation and forgiveness. Duke Frederick is converted by a hermit and he restores the dukedom to Duke Senior who, in his turn, restores the forest to the deer. Oliver also undergoes a change of heart, learns to love Orlando, and transfers their father's inheritance to his younger brother. Thus, the play ends on a note of rejoicing and merry-making.

==== Envy ====
The characters end happy and reconciled by love. However, "This wide and universal theatre present more woeful pageants" (II, vii, 137–138). The comedy is a respite from the so-called War Stage. "Are not these woods more free from peril than the envious court?" (II, i, 3–4).

From Oliver's description (IV, iii, 98–120), a golden green snake is instead seen by Orlando threateningly approaching the open mouth of "a wretched ragged man", tightening around his neck, "but suddenly seeing Orlando, it unlinked itself and with glides did slip away into a bush" (IV, iii, 106, 110–113). It can be deduced that with the appearance of the actor on stage, envy suddenly disappears. He who had fought like a Hercules, a hero not by chance invoked by Rosalind ("Now Hercules be thy speed", I, ii, 204–210), just before the challenge with "Charles, the wrestler", in allusion to the figure of the insign of Globe Theatre, which accompanied the presumed inscription: "Totus Mundus Agit Histrionem".

==== Gender ====
Because of all the gender reversals and discussions about the nature of men and women, many critics have discussed the play's treatment of gender. While disguised as Ganymede, Rosalind also presents a calculated perception of affection that is "disruptive of [the] social norms" and "independent of conventional gender signs" that dictate women's behavior as irrational. In her book As She Likes It: Shakespeare's Unruly Women, Penny Gay analyzes Rosalind's character in the framework of these gender conventions that ascribe femininity with qualities such as "graciousness, warmth ... [and] tenderness". However, Rosalind's demanding tone in her expression of emotions towards Orlando contradicts these conventions. Her disobedience to these features of femininity proves a "deconstruction of gender roles", since Rosalind believes that "the wiser [the woman is], the waywarder" she is. By claiming that women who are wild are smarter than those who are not, Rosalind refutes the perception of women as passive in their pursuit of men.

Other scholars have noted that the ending reconfirms and further entrenches patriarchal values. Kay Stanton, for example, argues that both Orlando and Rosalind have a nostalgia for the benevolent patriarchy of the past. She also notes that Celia, a character who alternatively images a world run by female solidarity, is entirely silent during act 5.

==== Religious allegory ====
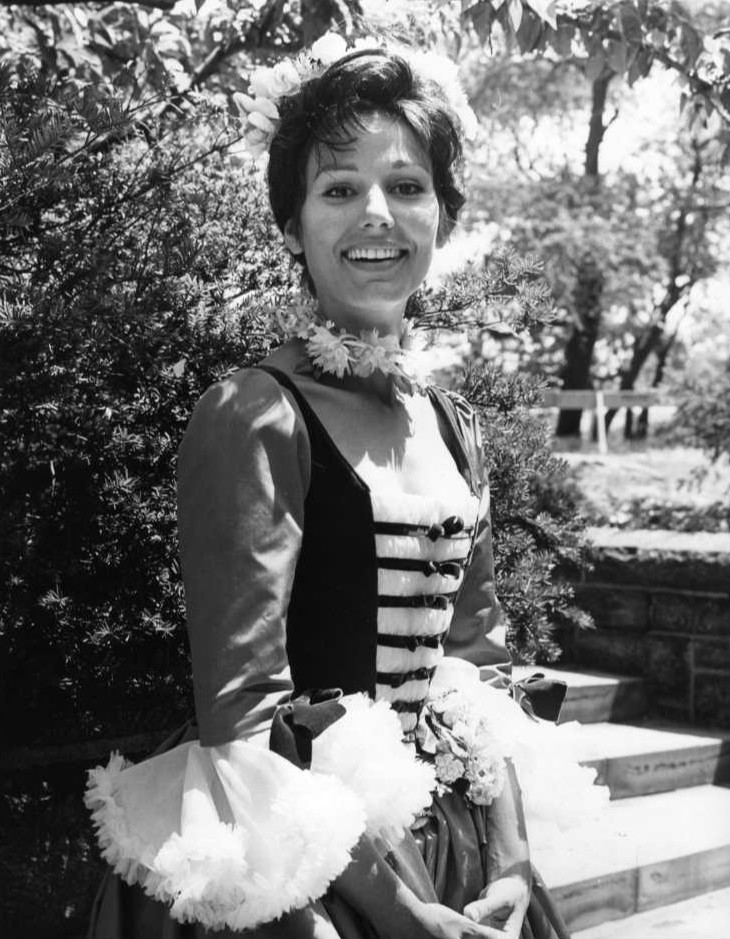
Paula Prentiss in As You Like It, 1963

University of Wisconsin professor Richard Knowles, the editor of the 1977 New Variorum edition of this play, in his article "Myth and Type in As You Like It", pointed out that the play contains mythological references in particular to Eden and to Hercules.

=== Music and songs ===
As You Like It is known as a musical comedy because of the number of songs in the play. These songs and music are incorporated in the action that takes place in the forest of Arden, as shown below:

- "Under the Greenwood tree", sung by Amiens. It summarises the views of Duke Senior on the advantages of country life over the amenities of the court.
- "Blow, blow, thou winter wind", sung by Amiens. It states that physical suffering caused by frost and winter winds is preferable to the inner suffering caused by man's ingratitude.
- "What shall he have that killed the deer": A song which offers spectacle and a pastoral atmosphere in contrast with love-talk in the adjoining scenes.
- "It was a lover and his lass": It serves as a prelude to the wedding ceremony. It praises spring time and is intended to announce the rebirth of nature and the theme of moral regeneration in human life. Thomas Morley set the lyrics of this song to music as a lute song.

=== Language ===
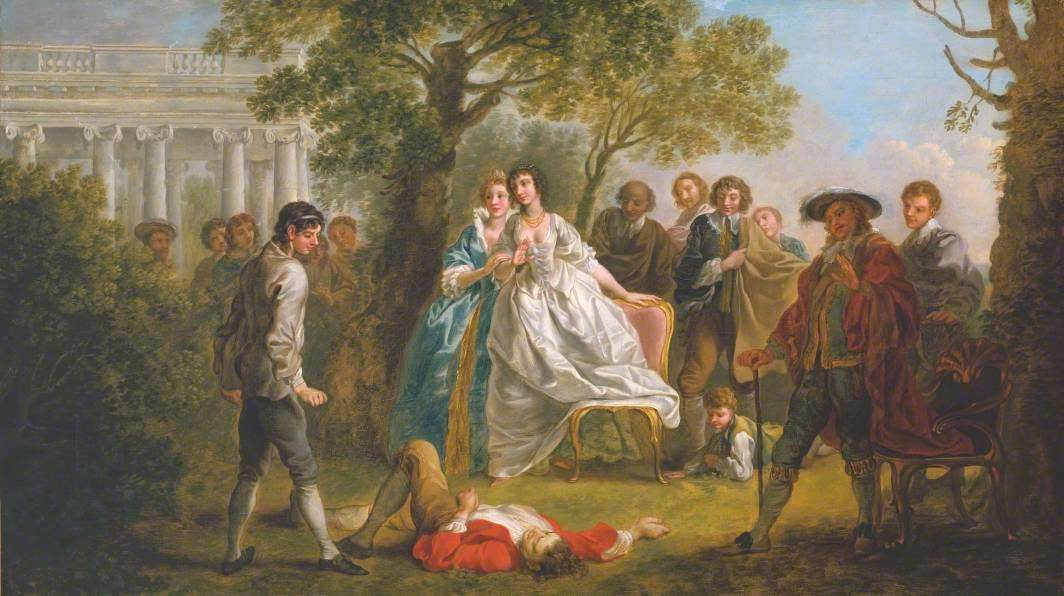
Francis Hayman, The Wrestling Scene from As You Like It, Tate, 1740-42

==== Use of prose ====
Shakespeare used prose for about 55% of the text, with the remainder in verse. Shaw called the prose, "brief [and] sure", saying it drives the meaning and is part of the play's appeal. Some of its verse he regards as ornamental. The dramatic convention of the time required the courtly characters to use verse, and the country characters prose, but in As You Like It this convention is overturned. For example, Rosalind, although the daughter of a Duke and thinking and behaving in high poetic style, actually speaks in prose as this is the "natural and suitable" way of expressing the directness of her character, and the love scenes between Rosalind and Orlando are in prose (III, ii, 277). In a contrast, Silvius describes his love for Phebe in verse (II, iv, 20). As a mood of a character changes, he or she may change from one form of expression to the other in mid-scene. In a metafictional touch, Jaques cuts off a prose dialogue with Rosalind because Orlando enters, using verse: "Nay then, God be wi' you, an you talk in blank verse" (IV, i, 29). The defiance of convention is continued when the epilogue is given in prose.

==== All the world's a stage ====
Act II, Scene VII, Line 139, features one of Shakespeare's most famous monologues, spoken by Jaques, which begins:

All the world's a stage
And all the men and women merely players;
They have their exits and their entrances,
And one man in his time plays many parts

The monologue describes a person's lifespan as a play in seven acts or “ages". These begin with "the infant/Mewling and puking in the nurse's arms" and work through six further stages to a "second childishness and mere oblivion,/Sans teeth, sans eyes, sans taste, sans everything".

==== Pastoral mode ====
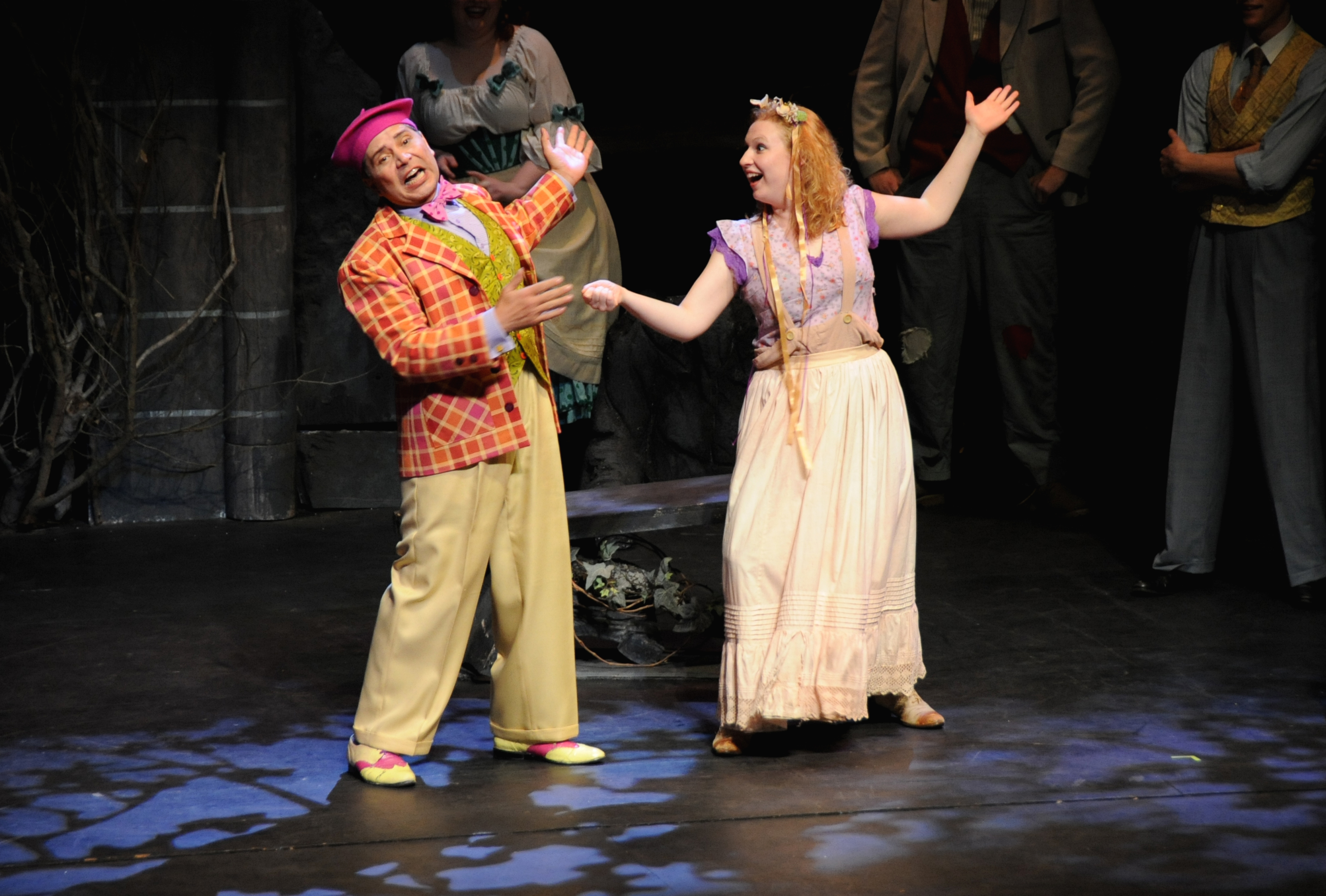
Touchstone and Audrey during a 2009 performance of the play

The main theme of pastoral comedy is love in all its guises in a rustic setting, the genuine love embodied by Rosalind contrasted with the sentimentalised affectations of Orlando, and the improbable happenings that set the urban courtiers wandering to find exile, solace or freedom in a woodland setting are no more unrealistic than the string of chance encounters in the forest which provoke witty banter and which require no subtleties of plotting and character development. The main action of the first act is no more than a wrestling match, and the action throughout is often interrupted by a song. At the end, Hymen himself arrives to bless the wedding festivities.

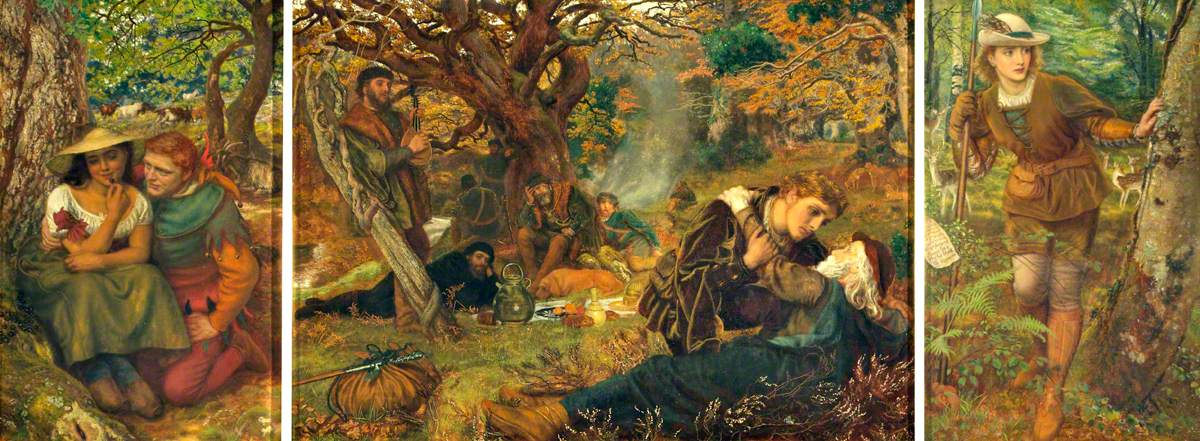
Arthur Hughes (1832-1915) As You Like It, 1870s, Walker Art Gallery

William Shakespeare's play As You Like It clearly falls into the pastoral romance genre; but Shakespeare does not merely use the genre, he develops it. Shakespeare also used the pastoral genre in As You Like It to 'cast a critical eye on social practices that produce injustice and unhappiness, and to make fun of anti-social, foolish and self-destructive behaviour', most obviously through the theme of love, culminating in a rejection of the notion of the traditional Petrarchan lovers.

The stock characters in conventional situations were familiar material for Shakespeare and his audience; it is the light repartee and the breadth of the subjects that provide opportunities for wit that put a fresh stamp on the proceedings. At the centre the optimism of Rosalind is contrasted with the misogynistic melancholy of Jaques. Shakespeare would take up some of the themes more seriously later: the usurper Duke and the Duke in exile provide themes for Measure for Measure and The Tempest.

The play, turning upon chance encounters in the forest and several entangled love affairs in a serene pastoral setting, has been found, by many directors, to be especially effective staged outdoors in a park or similar site.

== Performance history ==
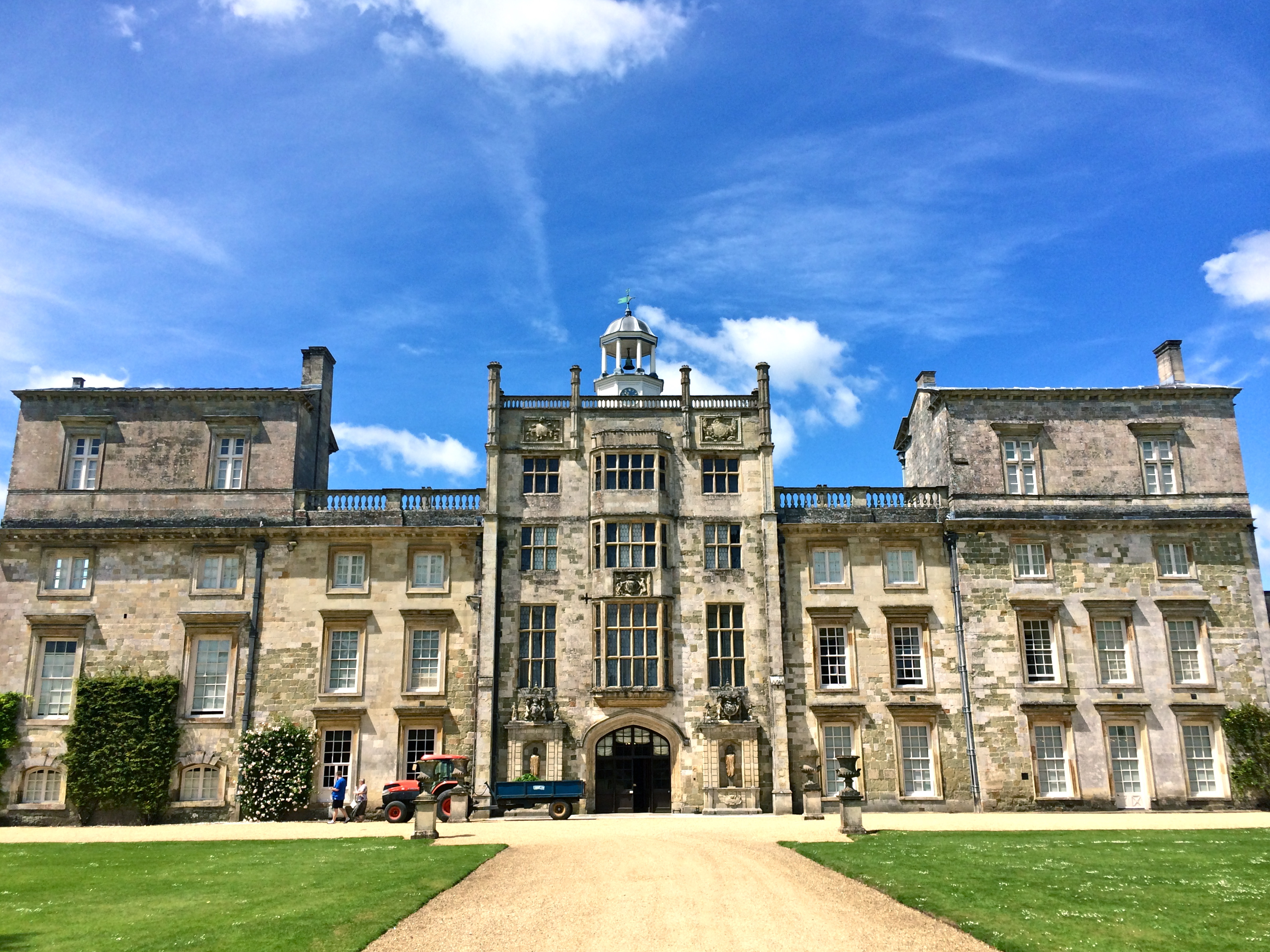
Wilton House, one of the venues suggested for the first court performance of the play

There is no certain record of any performance before the Restoration.

Two specific dates have been suggested by scholars for the first court performance of the play, although in neither case is the evidence conclusive, since the records do not specify the name of the play that was performed. The earlier of these is Shrove Tuesday, 20 February 1599, at Richmond Palace, before Elizabeth I by the Lord Chamberlain's Men. The later is 2 December 1603 at Wilton House, Wiltshire, the home of Mary Sidney, before King James by the same company, which by that time had been renamed the King's Men. Tradition holds that the play acted that night was As You Like It.

During the English Restoration, the King's Company was assigned the play by royal warrant in 1669. It is known to have been acted at Drury Lane in 1723, in an adapted form called Love in a Forest; Colley Cibber played Jaques. Another Drury Lane production seventeen years later returned to the Shakespearean text (1740).

Notable recent productions of As You Like It include the following examples:

- The 1936 Old Vic Theatre production starring Edith Evans and the 1961 Shakespeare Memorial Theatre production starring Vanessa Redgrave.
- The longest-running Broadway production starred Katharine Hepburn as Rosalind, Cloris Leachman as Celia, William Prince as Orlando, and Ernest Thesiger as Jaques, and was directed by Michael Benthall. It ran for 145 performances in 1950.
- In 1978, the first series of BBC Television Shakespeare included a version directed by Basil Coleman. It was shot on location at Glamis Castle in Scotland and starred Helen Mirren as Rosalind, Angharad Rees as Celia, and James Bolam as Touchstone.
- Another notable production was at the 2005 Stratford Festival in Stratford, Ontario, which was set in the 1960s and featured Shakespeare's lyrics set to music written by Barenaked Ladies.
- The 2013 RSC production directed by Maria Aberg channelled the feeling of being at a festival, with the wonderful central performances of Pippa Nixon as Rosalind and Alex Waldmann as Orlando being underpinned by a strong ensemble cast and the evocative music of Laura Marling.
- In 2014, theatre critic Michael Billington said his favourite production of the play was Cheek by Jowl's 1991 production, directed by Declan Donnellan.
- In 2023 a company which cast Rose Ayling-Ellis, who has a hearing impairment, as Celia performed the play at @sohoplace. This was the subject of a documentary on experiences of living with hearing impairment.
- Shakespeare's Globe staged the play in 2023, in an adaption that was noted for its LGBT/queer presentation of the play.
- Beginning in September 2026, there is an all-male production from The Royal Shakespeare Company starring Jonathan Groff as Rosalind and Fisayo Akinade as Celia. The production marks Groff's debut with the Royal Shakespeare Company and is directed by Daniel Evans. This production is meant to evoke "themes of identity, transformation, freedom, justice, and the liberation that comes from breaking free of expectations..." according to RSC Co-Artistic Directors Daniel Evans and Tamara Harvey.
- Shakespeare's Globe is set to stage the play again at the Globe Theatre in 2026.

== Adaptations ==
=== Music and dance ===
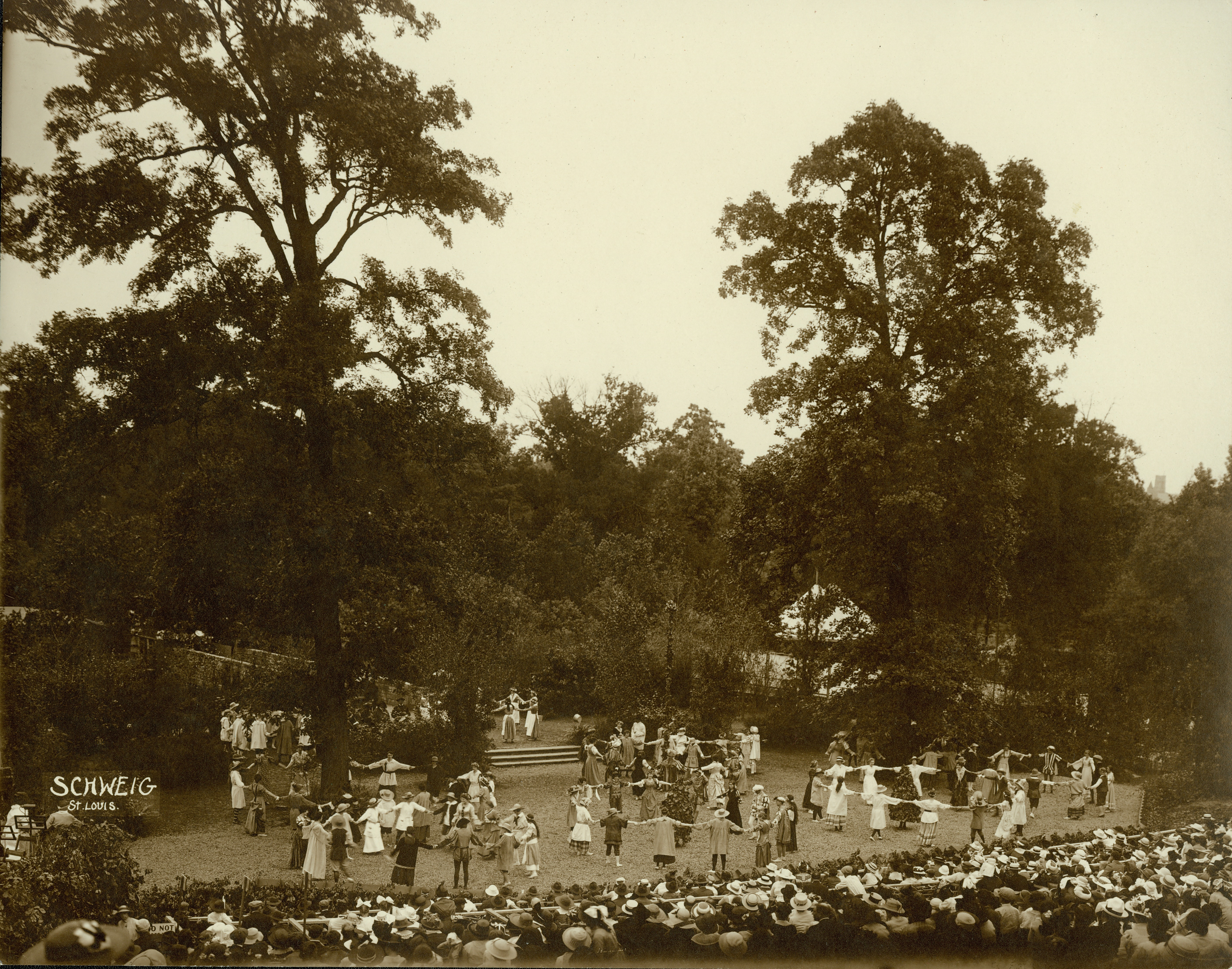
"As You Like It." Folk dance sequence during performance at Shakespeare Tercentenary Festival in Forest Park, 5–14 June 1916

Thomas Morley (c. 1557–1602) composed music for "It was a lover and his lass"; he lived in the same parish as Shakespeare, and at times composed music for Shakespeare's plays.

Roger Quilter set "Blow, Blow, Thou Winter Wind" for voice and piano (1905) in his 3 Shakespeare songs Op. 6

Florence Wickham wrote the music and lyrics for her opera Rosalind, based on As You Like It, which premiered at the open air Rockridge Theater in Carmel, New York, in August 1938.

In 1942, Gerald Finzi included a setting of "It was a lover and his lass" (V, iii) in his song cycle on Shakespearean texts Let Us Garlands Bring.

Cleo Laine sang a jazz setting of "It was a lover and his lass" on her 1964 album "Shakespeare... and all that Jazz". The composer is credited as "Young".

Donovan set "Under the Greenwood Tree" to music and recorded it for A Gift from a Flower to a Garden in 1968.

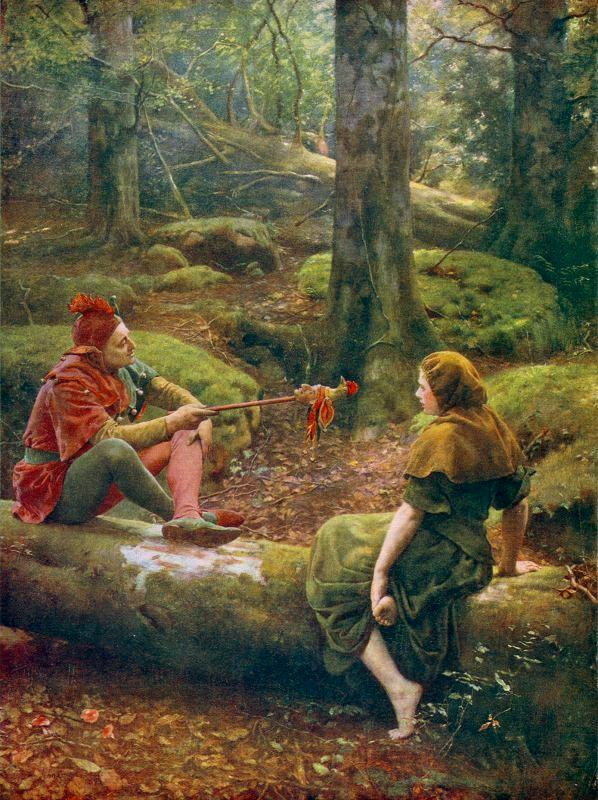
John Collier, In the Forest of Arden, 1892

Hans Werner Henze, in the first part of his sonata Royal Winter Music, which portraits Shakespearean characters, included "Touchstone, Audrey and William" as its 5th movement, in 1976.

Brian Protheroe's setting of "Under the Greenwood Tree" appears on his 1976 album "I/You". The song features Jethro Tull frontperson Ian Anderson on flute.

Rush's drummer and composer Neil Peart incorporated the passage "All the world's indeed a stage / And we are merely players / Performers and portrayers / Each another's audience / Outside the gilded cage" into the lyrics for "Limelight" from their 1981 progressive rock album Moving Pictures.

John Rutter composed a setting of "Blow, Blow, Thou Winter Wind" for chorus in 1992.

In 2005, Barenaked Ladies wrote and released a full album for the play. It was recorded for and exclusively released at the Stratford Shakespeare Festival.

Michael John Trotta composed a setting of "Blow, Blow, Thou Winter Wind" for choir in 2013.

In 2017 The Public Theater's Public Works program presented a musical adaptation of As You Like It, with original music and lyrics by Shaina Taub.

In 2018 Vancouver's Bard on the Beach introduced a musical adaptation of As You Like It, with songs by The Beatles performed by the cast. The production "broke Bard box office records" and toured several other cities, returning to Vancouver in 2023.

=== Radio ===
On 1 March 2015, BBC Radio 3 broadcast a new production directed by Sally Avens with music composed by actor and singer Johnny Flynn of the folk rock band Johnny Flynn and The Sussex Wit. The production included Pippa Nixon as Rosalind, Luke Norris as Orlando, Adrian Scarborough as Touchstone, William Houston as Jaques, Ellie Kendrick as Celia and Jude Akuwudike as Corin.

=== Film ===
Rosalind, print after Robert Walker Macbeth, 1896

The 1936 adaptation of the play was Laurence Olivier's first Shakespeare film. Olivier, however, served only in an acting capacity (performing the role of Orlando), rather than producing or directing the film. J. M. Barrie, author of Peter Pan, wrote the treatment. Made in England, As You Like It also starred director Paul Czinner's wife Elisabeth Bergner, who played Rosalind with a thick German accent. Although it was not a Hollywood production like the versions of A Midsummer Night's Dream and Romeo and Juliet made at about the same time and its cast was made up entirely of Shakespearean actors, it was not considered a success by either Olivier or the critics.

Helen Mirren starred as Rosalind in the 1978 BBC videotaped version of As You Like It, directed by Basil Coleman.

In 1992, Christine Edzard made another film adaptation of the play. It features James Fox, Cyril Cusack, Andrew Tiernan, Griff Rhys Jones, and Ewen Bremner. The action is transposed to a modern and bleak urban world.

Another film adaptation of As You Like It, set in 19th-century Japan, was released in 2006, directed by Kenneth Branagh. It stars Bryce Dallas Howard, David Oyelowo, Romola Garai, Alfred Molina, Kevin Kline, and Brian Blessed. Although it was made for cinemas, it was released to theatres only in Europe, and had its U.S. premiere on HBO in 2007. Despite not being a made-for-television film, Kevin Kline won a Screen Actors Guild Award for Outstanding Performance by a Male Actor in a Miniseries or Television Movie for his performance as Jaques.

In 2022, CBeebies filmed a version of the play adapted for children.

=== Other musical work ===
The 1902 Broadway musical Tommy Rot used an embedded narrative device where there was a play within a play; in this case the story taking place during a production of As You Like It. The Seven Doors of Danny, by Ricky Horscraft and John McCullough is based on the "Seven Ages of Man" element of the "All the world's a stage" speech and was premiered in April 2016.

=== Visual arts ===
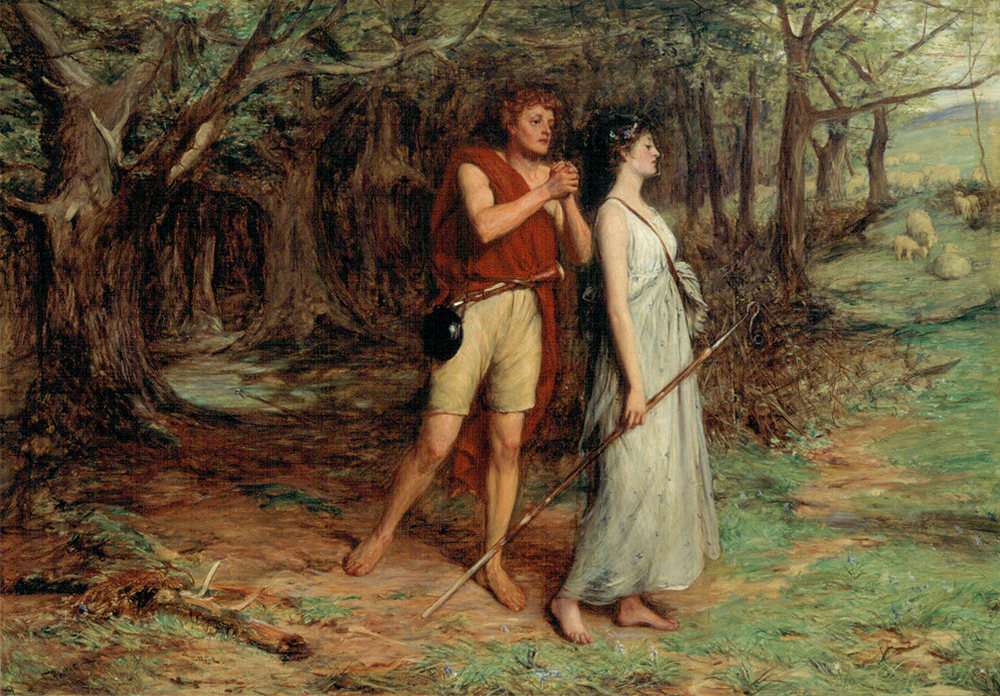
Silvius and Phoebe, John Pettie, 1872, Aberdeen Art Gallery

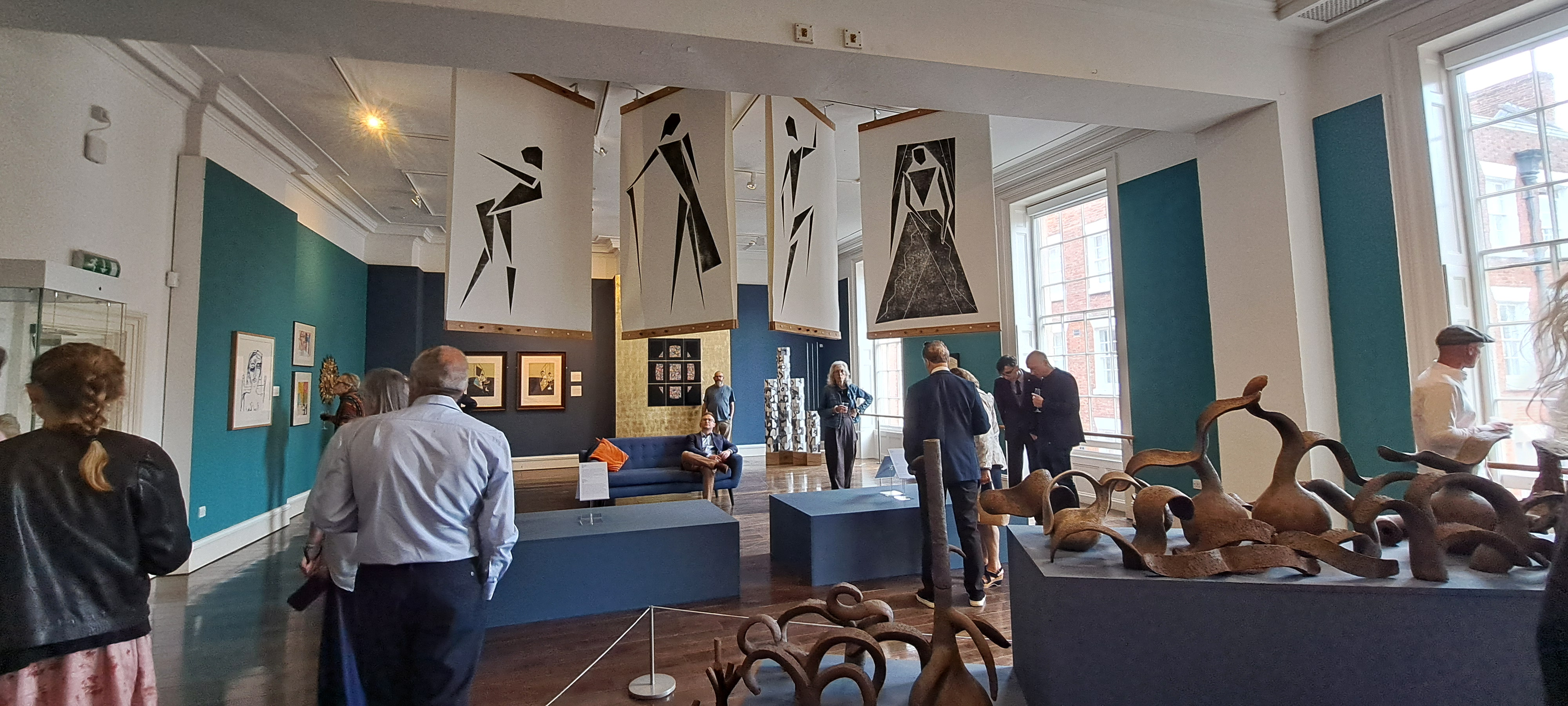
Contemporary art in a 2024 exhibition in Shrewsbury inspired by the play

The artist Salvador Dalí worked up and published costume and set designs for the play when it was directed by Luchino Visconti at the Teatro Eliseo in Rome in 1948.

Numerous other artists have been inspired to paint the play, including:

- John William Waterhouse
- Daniel Maclise
- Francis Hayman
- Eleanor Fortescue-Brickdale
- Margaret Gillies
- William Hodges
- John Pettie
- Robert Smirke
- John Collier
- Walter Deverell
- William Hamilton

== See also ==
- List of idioms attributed to Shakespeare
