= When This Cruel War Is Over =

19th century American war song

"Weeping, Sad and Lonely, or When This Cruel War Is Over"

Song
- Published: 1863
- Composer(s): Henry Tucker
- Lyricist(s): Charles Carroll Sawyer

"When This Cruel War Is Over", also known under the title "Weeping, Sad and Lonely", is a song written by Charles Carroll Sawyer with music by Henry Tucker. Published in 1863, it was a popular war song during the American Civil War, sung by both Union and Confederate troops.

"When This Cruel War Is Over" is in the key of G major and consists lyrically of four rhyming verses and a couplet refrain. Rhythmically, it conforms to the style of the sentimental ballads of the day, and its chorus was suited to arrangement for male a cappella groups. Lyricist Charles Sawyer was also known for his popular song "Who Will Care for Mother Now", while composer Henry Tucker was perhaps best known as the melodist of the song "Sweet Genevieve".

The song was published in several editions both in the North and the South, and was better known as "When This Cruel War Is Over" in the South and as "Weeping, Sad and Lonely", its opening line, in the North. In Southern editions, the first verse's reference to a "suit of blue" was changed to "suit of gray" and the rhyme adjusted to fit the new word. The song's fourth verse makes reference to the Union flag; this was also altered in Southern editions to refer to the Confederate flag instead. During the war, it sold more than one million copies, and was one of the most popular tunes of its era.

Historian Willard Heaps called the ballad "by far the most popular sweetheart 'separation' song in both the North and South." Bruce Catton wrote of the song, "it expressed the deep inner feeling of the boys who had gone to war so blithely in an age when no one would speak the truth about the reality of war: war is tragedy, it is better to live than to die, young men who go down to dusty death in battle have been horribly tricked." At one point, the Army of the Potomac was forbidden from performing the song on grounds that it fomented desertion, but soldiers mostly ignored the order, and it was quickly withdrawn. Contemporaneous sources mostly championed the tune, with the Cleveland Leader calling it "the greatest musical success ever known in this country ... [its] melody catches the popular ear and the words touch the popular heart."

The tune's popularity led Confederate songwriter John Hill Hewitt to write an answer song, titled "When Upon the Field of Glory". A lyric sung to the same melody, called "When This Cruel Draft Is Over", lamented the plight of potential draftees, and later in the war, lyrics to this tune praising George McClellan, and championing him as a presidential candidate to succeed Abraham Lincoln, were written under the title "Shouting 'Mac' and Freedom". The tune also inspired one Sergeant Johnson of the 54th Massachusetts Infantry to write lyrics to the tune as a prisoner of war, entitled "Down in Charleston Jail". Other answer songs or parodies included "Yes, I Would the War Were Over" (by Sep Winner), "I Remember the Hour When Sadly We Parted", "When This War Is Over, I Will Come Back To Thee", "The War Is Nearly Over", "Yes, Darling, Sadly I Remember", and "When the Lonely Watch I'm Keeping".

== Lyrics ==
(1st Verse)
Dearest love, do you remember,
When we last did meet,
How you told me that you loved me,
Kneeling at my feet?
Oh! how proud you stood before me
In your suit of blue,
When you vow'd to me and country
Ever to be true.

(Chorus)
Weeping, sad and lonely,
Hopes and fears how vain! Yet praying,
When the cruel war is over,
Praying that we meet again!

When the summer breeze is sighing
Mournfully along;
Or when autumn leaves are falling,
Sadly breathes the song.
Oft in dreams I see thee lying
On the battle plain,
Lonely, wounded, even dying,
Calling, but in vain.

(Chorus)

If amid the din of battle
Nobly you should fall,
Far away from those who love you,
None to hear you call
Who would whisper words of comfort,
Who would soothe your pain?
Ah! the many cruel fancies
Ever in my brain.

(Chorus)

But our country called you, darling,
Angels cheer your way;
While our nation's sons are fighting,
We can only pray.
Nobly strike for God and liberty,
Let all nations see
How we love the starry banner,
Emblem of the free.

(Chorus)

== Sheet Music ==
IMSLP
