= Let Us Garlands Bring (Finzi) =

Song cycle by Gerald Finzi

Let Us Garlands Bring is a song cycle for baritone and piano composed by Gerald Finzi between 1929 and 1942, and published as his Op. 18. It consists of five settings of songs from plays by William Shakespeare. It was premiered on 12 October 1942 at a National Gallery lunchtime concert in London. That day was the 70th birthday of Ralph Vaughan Williams, and the cycle is dedicated to him. Finzi subsequently arranged the work for baritone and string orchestra.

A typical performance lasts about 15 minutes. The songs, with their sources, are:

1. "Come Away, Come Away, Death" (Twelfth Night, Act II, Scene 4)
2. "Who Is Silvia?" (The Two Gentlemen of Verona, Act IV, Scene 2)
3. "Fear No More the Heat o' the Sun" (Cymbeline, Act IV, Scene 2)
4. "O Mistress Mine" (Twelfth Night, Act II, Scene 3)
5. "It Was a Lover and His Lass" (As You Like It, Act V, Scene 3)

The title of the cycle is the last line of "Who Is Silvia?".

== Recordings ==
- 1995: Bryn Terfel, Malcolm Martineau, on The Vagabond, Deutsche Grammophon
- 2001: Janet Baker, Geoffrey Parsons, on Baker, BBC
- 2005: Teddy Tahu Rhodes, Sharolyn Kimmorley, on Vagabond, ABC Classics
- 2005: Roderick Williams, Iain Burnside, on I Said To Love, Naxos
- 2013: Yves Saelens, Inge Spinette, on Phaedra
- 2016: Ian Bostridge, Antonio Pappano, on Shakespeare Songs, Warner Classics
