= Pietro Alfieri =

Roman Catholic priest

Pietro Alfieri (29 June 1801 – 12 June 1863) was an Italian Catholic priest and at one time a Camaldolese monk, who was born and died in Rome.

For many years, Alfieri was a professor of singing at the English College in Rome. He is remembered chiefly for his scientific writings and his collections of music of the old masters. Perhaps his most valuable work is his Raccolta di Musica Sacra in seven large volumes, a reprint of the sixteenth-century church music, mostly by Palestrina, which was supplemented by later and smaller collections, such as Excerpta ex celebrioribus de musicâ viris (Rome, 1840), and Raccolta di Motetti (Rome, 1841). On plain chant he published Accompagnamento coll' organo (Rome, 1840); Ristabilmento del canto e della musica ecclesiastica (Rome, 1843); Saggio storico del canto Gregoriano (Rome 1845); Prodromo sulla restaurazione de' libri di canto Gregoriano (Rome, 1857). He also translated into Italian Charles-Simon Catel's Traité d'harmonie and contributed to the Gazzetta musicale di Milano and other periodicals many articles on church music of great value to the student.
