= Joseph Netherclift =

English composer and lithographer

- Born: 8 September 1794
- Died: 8 April 1863
- Occupations: Lithographer, composer

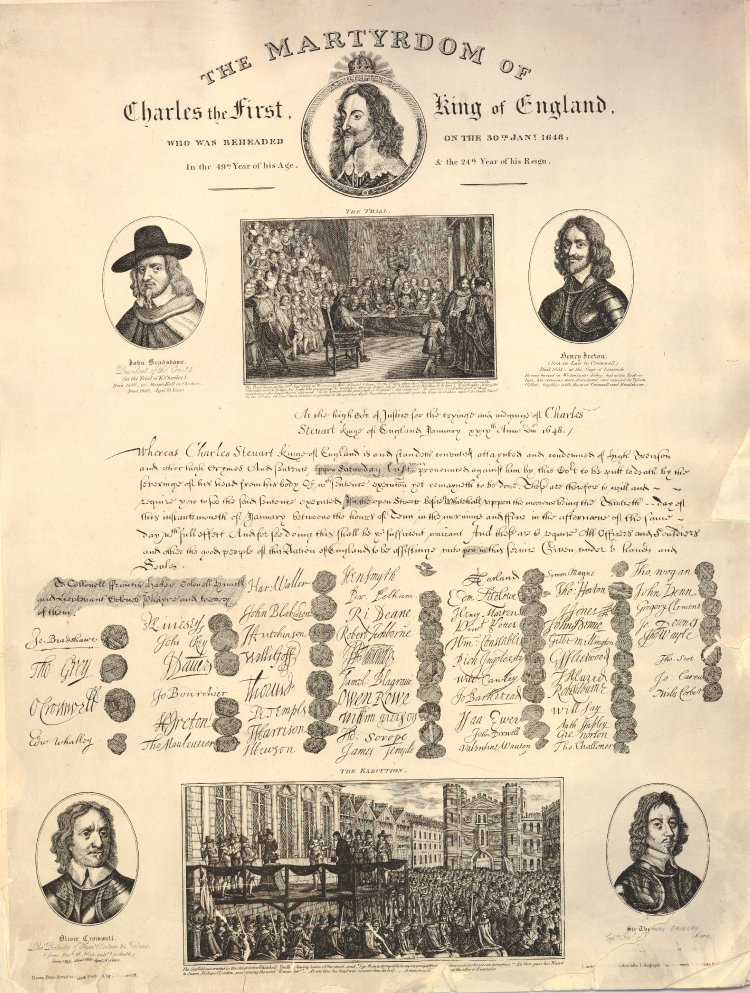
Martyrdom of Charles I, by Netherclift

Joseph Netherclift (8 September 1792 – 8 April 1863) was an English composer and lithographer. He was awarded a medal in 1829 for his method of lithography. He was making lithographic facsimiles of historical documents in 1833.

Perhaps his most famous work is "We Happy Shepherd Swains".

Netherclift died 8 April 1863 and is buried in Brompton Cemetery, London.
