= Die Loreley =

1863 opera by Max Bruch

Die Loreley is an opera by Max Bruch to a German-language libretto by Emanuel Geibel, originally intended for Felix Mendelssohn.

Bruch did not complete the work until 1863. The opera was premiered at Mannheim on 14 June 1863. It was revived in 1887 in Leipzig conducted by Gustav Mahler. The British premiere was in 1986 by University College Opera, London.
