= Alessandro Casagrande =

Italian composer and pianist

- Born: 11 April 1922
- Died: 21 October 1964 (aged 42)
- Occupations: composer and pianist

Alessandro Casagrande (1922 – 1964) was an Italian composer and pianist. There is an international piano competition held in his name.

Casagrande was born in Terni on 11 April 1922. His parents were musicians and owned a music shop in the town. He started to learn playing the piano when he was very young, and soon became interested in composing. His composed his first work, Fogli d'Album, at the age of 12, although it was not published until 1965. He became a student at Accademia Nazionale di Santa Cecilia in Rome, and studied under Rodolfo Caporali. In 1942 he received his diploma in piano.

He studied composition with Virgilio Mortari, and in 1955 he received a diploma from the Conservatorio Rossini in Pesaro. At this point he had already had several pieces published and performed, including a Mass for St Cecilia which was performed in Florence in 1942, and the symphonic poem l'Aminta, performed in 1949 at the Mozarteum in Salzburg, in a concert conducted by Wilhelm Furtwängler.

From 1956 until his death in 1964 he was the director of the Briccialdi di Temi conservatory.

He married the pianist Adriana Morelli in 1947. In 1966, two years after his death, she founded a piano competition in his name, which is held annually in Terni.

== Sources ==
- Biography Fondazione Alessandro e Adriana Casagrande
