= Ernst Heuser =

Ernst Heuser (1863–1942) was a German pianist, teacher and composer of classical music.

Heuser was born on 9 April 1863 in Elberfeld and died on 12 June 1942 in Köln.

His students at the Conservatorium der Musik in Coeln included Felix Borowski, and his compositions included a piano trio, an opera Aus Grosser Zeit, and other works.
