= Lords of BSV =

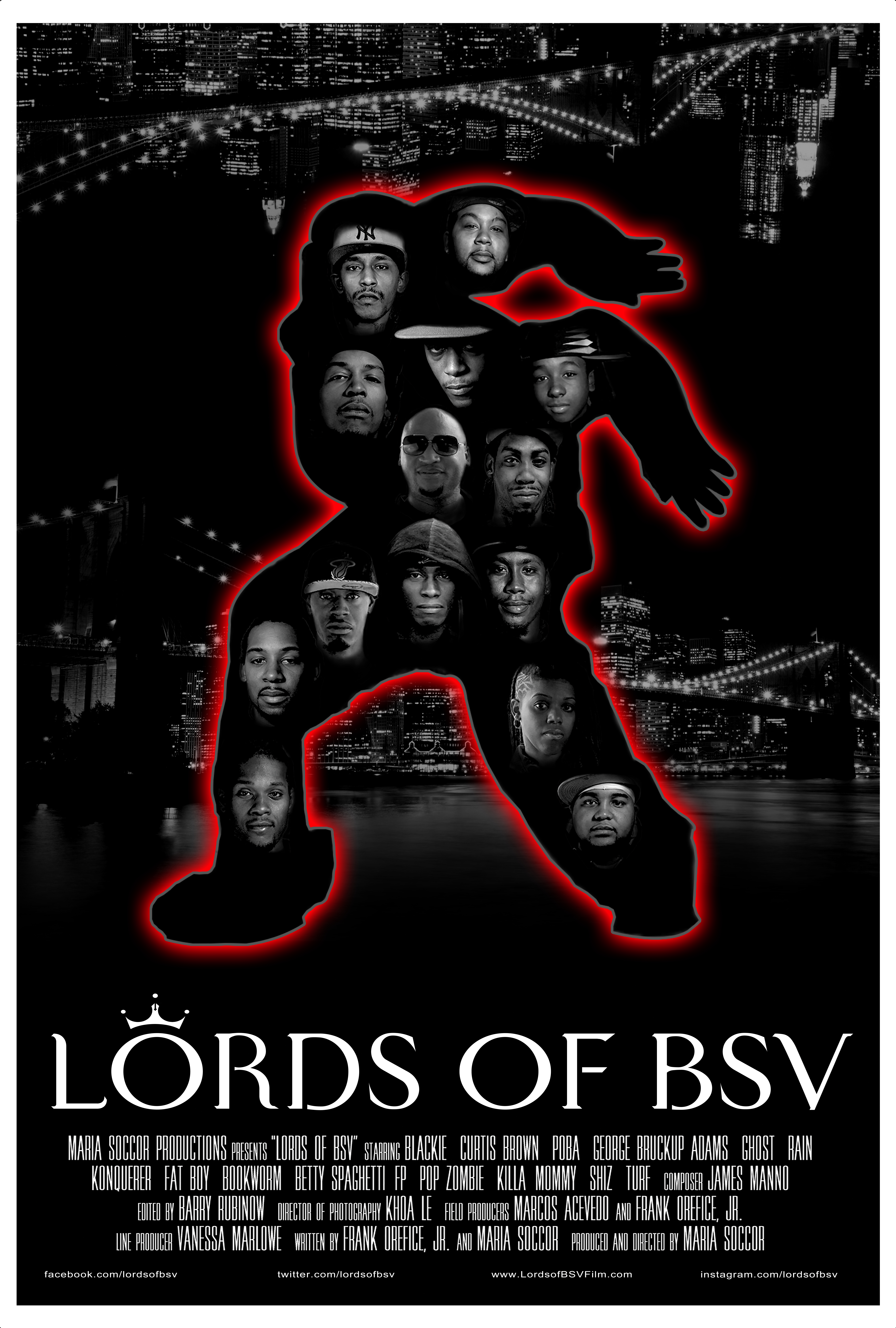
- Theatrical release poster
- Directed by: Maria Soccor
- Written by: Maria Soccor; Frank Orefice Jr.
- Produced by: Maria Soccor; Marcos Acevedo; Frank Orefice Jr.; Vanessa Marlowe; Javier Osorio
- Starring: George "Bruckup" Adams; Chris "Blackie" Davis; Albert "The Ghost" Esquilin; Alonzo "Turf" Jones; Justen "Rain" Quinones; Shawn "Poba" Theagene; Keanna "Betty Spagetti" Vaughn; Dravon "Konqueror" Washington
- Cinematography: Khoa Le
- Edited by: Barry Rubinow
- Music by: James Manno
- Production company: Maria Soccor Productions
- Distributed by: Red Bull Media House
- Release date: July 30, 2016 (Red Bull TV)
- Running time: 79 minutes
- Country: United States
- Language: English
- Budget: $687,000 (United States)

Lords of BSV is a 2016 American documentary film directed by Maria Soccor about bruk up dancing, a dance style that originated in Jamaica, West Indies in the early 1990s. The film premiered on April 9, 2015, at the Riverside International Film Festival and made its digital television debut on Red Bull TV on July 30, 2016.

== Production ==
In 2014, actress Soccor began writing, directing, and producing documentaries. After seeing them dance first-hand, Soccor decided that her first film as director would be to tell the story of the brukup (also stylized as bruck up) dancers in the Bedford-Stuyvesant neighborhood of New York City.

The film was licensed by Red Bull Media House, which released it online in July 2016. It was the longest screening film on their platform.

== Reception ==
=== General reception ===
Lords of BSV received positive reviews upon release. Tom Neff, founder of the Documentary Channel and Emmy Award winning director/producer, described Lords of BSV as “an example of the finest in documentary filmmaking today. It is a perfect marriage of in-depth content with a unique approach to form."

In September 2016, the film was presented by Newark Mayor Ras Baraka at Shaquille O'Neal's CityPlex12 movie theater in Newark.

The film was also featured twice on television on WABC-TV in New York City.

=== Awards ===
Lords of BSV premiered at the Riverside International Film Festival in April 2015 and won awards at thirteen different film festivals, including the Madrid International Film Festival, Langston Hughes African American Film Festival (now known as the Seattle Black Film Festival), Long Island International Film Expo, Rahway International Film Festival, Hudson Valley International Film Festival, VisionFest Film Festival, International Filmmaker Festival of World Cinema London, International Filmmaker Festival of World Cinema Milan, and International Filmmaker Festival of World Cinema Berlin. Some of the award wins include best director of a feature documentary and a jury award for best documentary.
