= Nashville Film Festival =

Annual film festival in Tennessee, US

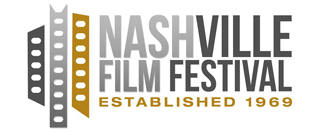
- Location: Nashville, Tennessee, U.S.
- Founded: 1969
- Festival date: Annually, in September
- Language: English; International
- Website: nashvillefilmfestival.org

The Nashville Film Festival (NashFilm), held annually in Nashville, Tennessee, was established in 1969. It is the longest-running film festival in the American South and among the oldest in the United States.

In 2024, the festival received more than 3,800 submissions from over 100 countries and programmed 183 films. Attendance has grown to nearly 15,000.

The festival offers 15 film competition categories, with Academy Award qualifying status in the narrative, documentary, and animated short categories, as well as Screenwriting and Pitch Competitions. In addition to seven days of film screenings, the festival provides industry panels, networking events, music showcases, parties and receptions.

== Program and focus ==
The Nashville Film Festival showcases feature films, short films, music videos, and episodic projects from across the globe, with specific competition categories for Tennessee and student filmmakers. The program highlights many genres, including narrative, documentary, music documentary, drama, comedy, experimental, animation, and horror.

Because Nashville is known as "Music City," a major focus of the festival is music programming. In addition to unique competition categories like Music Documentary Features and Music Videos, NashFilm presents showcases, workshops, and other events bringing songwriters, composers, and music industry professionals together with filmmakers to promote collaboration.

In addition to producing the annual festival, NashFilm is a 501(c)(3) arts advocacy organization that serves the local community through year-round programs, including film education screenings for public school students, a summer film camp for high schoolers, and free outdoor film screenings for locals.

== History ==
Founder Mary Jane Coleman began the Sinking Creek Film Celebration in East Tennessee in 1969. The festival was later moved to Nashville. In 1998, the name was changed to the Nashville Independent Film Festival and shortened to Nashville Film Festival in 2003. It is currently held across seven days in September at venues across Nashville.

== Reception ==
The festival was voted as one of the "50 Film Festivals Worth the Entry Fee" by MovieMaker in 2013, 2015, 2016, 2018, 2019, 2020, 2021, 2022, 2023, 2024, 2025, and 2026, and by Dread Central as one of the "90 Best Genre Film Festivals on Earth" in 2025 for its sidebar Graveyard Shift Shorts.

== Winners ==
=== Narrative Competition ===
Grand Jury Prize
Year	Film	Director
2015	Monument to Michael Jackson	Darko Lungolov
2014	Club Sandwich	Fernando Eimbcke
2013	If You Die, I Will Kill You	Hiner Saleem
2012	The Dynamiter	Matthew Gordon
2011	Weekend	Andrew Haigh
2010	Hipsters	Valery Todorovsky

Best Actress
Year	Actress	Film
2015	Geraldine Chaplin	Sand Dollars
2014	Britt Robertson	Undiscovered Gyrl
2013	Jane Adams	All the Light in the Sky
2012	Alia Shawkat	That's What She Said
2011	Guadalupe Alonso	The Last Summer of La Boyita
2010	Paprika Steen	Applause

Best Actor
Year	Actor	Film
2015	Boris Milivojevic	Monument to Michael Jackson
2014	Manolis Mavromatakis	The Enemy Within
2013	Silas Yelich	The Cold Lands
2012	William Ruffin	The Dynamiter
2011	Tom Cullen	Weekend
2010	Anton Shagin	Hipsters

Best Screenplay
Year	Film	Screenwriter(s)
2015	Margarita, with a Straw	Shonali Bose
2014	The Invisible Collection	Bernard Attal
2013	Pit Stop	Yen Tan, David Lowery
2012	Supporting Characters	Tarik Lowe, Daniel Schechter

Regal Cinemas / Nashville Film Festival Dreammaker Award
Year	Film	Director
2009	Make-out with Violence	The Deagol Brothers
2008	Two embraces	Enrique Begne
2007	Small engine repair	Niall Heery
2006	Almost Heaven	Ed Herzog
2005	Midwinter Night's Dream	Goran Paskaljevic
2004	Take Out	Sean Baker, Shih-Ching Tsou

Audience Choice Award for Best Narrative Feature
Year	Film	Director
2009	That Evening Sun	Scott Teems
2008	Cook County	David Pomes
2007	Randy and the Mob	Ray McKinnon
2006	Live and Become	Radu Mihaileanu
2005	The Aryan Couple	John Daly
2005	Hustle & Flow	Craig Brewer
2005	Loggerheads	Tim Kirkman
2005	The Thing About My Folks	Raymond De Felitta
2004	Saved!	Brian Dannelly

=== Graveyard Shift Competition ===
Grand Jury Prize
Year	Film	Director
2017	A Closer Walk with Thee	John C. Clark, Brie Williams
2016	The Lure	Agnieszka Smoczynska
2015	Alleluia They Look Like People	Fabrice du Welz Perry Blackshear
2014	Wetlands	David Wnendt

Best Actor
Year	Actor	Film
2017	Aj Knight	A Closer Walk with Thee
2016	Adrian Țofei	Be My Cat: A Film for Anne
2015	MacLeod Andrews	They Look Like People
2014	Jan Bijvoet	Borgman

Best Actress
Year	Actor	Film
2017	Suela Bako	Bloodlines
2016	Marta Mazurek	The Lure
2015	Amy Everson	Felt
2014	Robin Wright Carla Juri	The Congress Wetlands

=== Documentary Competition ===
Best Documentary Feature
Year	Film	Director
2025	The Gas Station Attendant	Karla Murthy
2015	Frame by Frame	Alexandria Bombach, Mo Scarpeli
2014	BESA: The Promise	Rachel Goslins
2013	Far Out Isn't Far Enough: The Tomi Ungerer Story	Brad Bernstein
2012	Salaam Dunk	David Fine
2011	If a Tree Falls: A Story of the Earth Liberation Front	Marshall Curry
2010	Racing Dreams	Marshall Curry
2009	Shakespeare and Victor Hugo's Intimacies	Yulene Olaizola
2008	Shake the Devil off	Peter Entell
2007	Banished	Marco Williams
2006	The Trials Of Darryl Hunt	Ricki Stern, Annie Sundberg
2006	A lion in the house	Steven Bognar, Julia Reichert
2005	The Real Dirt on Farmer John	Taggart Siegel
2004	Born into Brothels	Ross Kauffman, Zana Briski

Audience Choice Award for Best Documentary Feature
Year	Film	Director
2020	Wildflower	Matt Smuckler
2015	In My Father's House	Ricki Stern, Annie Sundberg
2009	Rock Prophecies	John Chester
2008	Sons of Lwala	Barry Simmons
2007	The Clinton 12	Keith McDaniel
2006	Chances: The Women of Magdalene	Tom Neff
2005	Cowboy Jack's Home Movies (or, Shakespeare was a big George Jones fan)	Robert Gordon, Morgan Neville
2004	Born into Brothels	Ross Kauffman, Zana Briski

Impact of Music Award
Year	Film	Director
2009	Youssou Ndour: I bring what I Love	Elizabeth Chai Vasarhelyi
2008	Young@Heart	Stephen Walker
2007	Gypsy Caravan	Jasmine Dellal
2006	The Refugee All-Stars	Zach Niles, Banker White
2005	Rhythm Is It!	Thomas Grube & Enrique Sanchez Lansch
2004	Give me your hand	Heddy Honigmann

Tennessee Independent Spirit Award for the Best Feature-Length Film Directed By a Tennessee Resident
Year	Film	Director
2009	Make-utu with Violence	The Deagol Brothers
2008	Sons of Lwala	Barry Simmons
2007	Adrenaline	Robert S. Lynn
2006	Chances: The Women of Magdalene	Tom Neff
2005	Cowboy Jack's Home Movies (or, Shakespeare was a big George Jones fan)	Robert Gordon, Morgan Neville
2004	The Royal Academy	Tony Cane-Honeysett

=== Shorts ===
Best Narrative Short
Year	Film	Director
2015	Daytimer	Riz Ahmed
2014	Rhino Full Throttle	Erik Schmitt
2013	Hatch	Christoph Kuschnig
2012	Curfew	Shawn Christensen
2011	Mary Last Seen	Sean Durkin
2010	The Armoire	Jamie Travis
2009	Next Floor	Denis Villeneuve
2008	I love Sarah Jane	Spencer Susser
2007	The Last Dog in Rwanda	Jens Assur
2006	Doll no. 639	Andras György Desi
2005	In the morning	Danielle Lurie
2004	Deep Silence	Gustavo Loza

Best Animated Short
Year	Film	Director
2015	Bear Story	Gabriel Osorio
2014	Rabbit and Deer	Péter Vácz
2013	Oh, Willy...	Emma Swaef & Marc Roels
2012	Dripped	Leo Verrier
2011	Something Left, Something Taken	Max Porter & Ru Kuwahata
2010	The Spine	Chris Landreth
2009	I Am So Proud Of You	Don Hertzfeldt
2008	Madame Tutli-Putli	Chris Lavis and Maciek Szczerbowksi
2007	Dreams and Desires- Family Ties	Joanna Quinn
2006	City Paradise	Gaelle Denis
2005	The Tree Officer	Neil Jack
2004	Hello	Jonathon Nix

Best Documentary Short
Year	Film	Director
2015	La Vie en rose comme dans les films	Christophe M. Saber
2014	The Last Days of Peter Bergmann	Ciaran Cassidy
2013	A Story for the Modlins	Sergio Oksman
2012	Meaning of Robots	Matt Lenski
2011	Bye Bye Now!	Aideen O'Sullivan
2010	Q&A	The Rauch Brothers
2009	The Witness: From the Balcony of Room 306	Adam Pertofsky
2008	My olympic summer	Daniel Robin
2007	Fighting Cholitas	Mariam Jobrani
2006	The Tribe	Tiffany Shlain
2005	Small Town Secrets	Katherine Legget
2004	African American	Askia Holloway

Best Experimental Short
Year	Film	Director
2015	(null)	Michael Lange, David Gesslbauer
2014	Confessions With an Open Curtain	Eli Cortinas
2013	Workers Leaving the Factory (Again)	Katharina Gruzei
2012	All the Lines Flow Out	Charles Lim
2011	All Flowers in Time	Jonathan Caouette
2010	Feeder	Joseph Ernst
2009	Hallelujah! Gorilla revival	Jason LaRay Keener, Jeremiah Ledbetter
2008	SEVILLA → ∞ 06	Olivo Barbieri
2007	3 Minutes	Christopher Brunner
2006	Careless Reef - Abu Kifan	Gerard Holthuis
2005	Layette	Ariana Gerstein
2004	Papillon d'amour	Nicolas Provost

Golden Opportunity Award for Best College Student Short
Year	Film	Director
2015	Wire Cutters	Jack Anderson
2014	The Pink Helmet Posse	Kristelle Laroche & Benjamin Mullincosson
2013	I Think This is the Closest to How the Footage Looked	Yuval Hameiri
2012	Bian Zi	Chun-Yi Hsieh
2011	Deeper Than Yesterday	Ariel Kleeman
2010	The City in the Sky	Giacomo Climini
2009	Walnut	Amy Gebhardt
2008	The Execution of Solomon Harris	Wyatt Garfield & Ed Yonaitis
2007	Bitch	Lilah Vandenburgh
2006	Lucky	Avie Luthra
2005	Victoria para Chino	Cary Fukunaga
2004	Savior	Erla Skuladottir

Best College Student Animation
Year	Film	Director
2007	The Wraith of Cobble Hill	Adam Parrish King
2006	She She She She's a Bombshell	Ben Levin
2005	Backseat Bingo	Liz Blazer
2004	Pedantphilia	Sandra Cheng

Best Young Filmmaker
Year	Film	Director
2009	Eye for an eye	Arni Beinteinn Arnason
2008	Western spaghetti	Joseph Procopio
2007	Drive	Joseph Procopio
2006	Shoes	Jake Sawyer
2005	And then everything I saw, I liked	Ariel Jackson, Ashley Rutledge, Emily Brisbon
2004	Jai-Yen: Cool Heart	Daniel Howard

Tennessee Independent Spirit Award for the Best Short-Form Directed By a Tennessee Resident
Year	Film	Director
2009	Jennifer	Stewart Copeland
2008	Blindsided	Drew Langer

=== Music videos ===
Best Music Video by a Nashville Filmmaker
Year	Film	Director
2007	You don't know me	Jason Satterlund
2006	Apparitions of melody - Kids in the way	Blake McClure & The Brads
2005	When I think about cheatin'	Robert Deaton, George Flanigen & Marc Oswald

Best Music Video by a Non-Nashville Filmmaker
Year	Film	Director
2007	Jumbo in the modernworld	minivegas
2006	When in Rome	Nickel Creek, Dir. Dean Karr
2005	Whiskey Lullaby	Rick Schroder

Best Music Video
Year	Film	Director
2023	Portrait of a Blank Slate	Ted Nivison
2004	100 Years	Five for Fighting, Dir. Trey Fanjoy

Music Video Audience Award
Year	Film	Director
2005	Mercy Now	Mary Gauthier, Dir. Demetria Kalodimos
2004	100 Years	Five for Fighting, Dir. Trey Fanjoy

Best use of coffee in a scene
Year	Film	Director
2004	Mother May-o	Wes Edwards

=== Special ===
REEL Current Award
Year	Film	Director
2009	Garbage Dreams	Mai Iskander
2008	Mountain Top Removal	Michael O'Connell
2007	Manufactured Landscapes	Jennifer Baichwal
2005	The Real Dirt on Farmer John	Taggart Siegel

Nashville Public Television (NPT) Human Spirit Award
Year	Film	Director
2009	Crude	Joe Berlinger
2008	Sons of Lwala	Barry Simmons
2007	The Clinton 12	Keith McDaniel

Lonely Seal Releasing Feature Film Award
Year	Film	Director
2008	Eden court	Paul Leuer

Rosetta Miller Perry Award for the Best Film By A Black Filmmaker
Year	Film	Director
2009	Gospel Hill	Giancarlo Esposito
2008	The Black List	Elvis Mitchell
2007	Matthew Kennedy: One Man's Journey	Nina Kennedy

Best Gay, Lesbian, Bisexual, or Transgendered (GLBT) Film Award
Year	Film	Director
2009	The Baby Formula	Alison Reid
2008	Were the World Mine	Tom Gustafson
2008	The Manual	Sophie Gregg

Best Hispanic Filmmaker Award
Year	Film	Director
2009	Hands of Abel	Victor Barcena

Women In Film & Television Award For Best Film Directed By A Woman
Year	Film	Director
2009	Shakespeare and Victor Hugo's intimacies	Yulene Olaizola
2008	Taking root: the vision of Wangari Maathai	Lisa Merton & Alan Dater

Best Cinematography in a Feature Film
Year	Film	Director
2009	Seamus Tierney, the Narrows	Francois Velle
2008	Tracing Cowboys	David Morrison
2007	The hip hop project	Ari Issler and Matt Ruskin

Special Jury Prize for Acting Ensemble
Year	Winner	Film
2009	cast of Children of Invention	Children of Invention

Special Jury Prize for Acting
Year	Winner	Film
2009	Vincent D'Onofrio	The Narrows

Special Jury Prize for Experimental Narrative
Year	Film	Director
2009	Afterschool	Antonio Campos

Special Jury Prize for Bravery in Storytelling
Year	Film	Director
2009	Prodigal Sons	Kimberly Reed

Lifetime Achievement Award
Year	Winner
2009	Hal Holbrook
2008	Patricia Neal

President's Award
Year	Winner
2009	William Shatner
2008	Kimberly Williams-Paisley
2007	Lawrence Bender
2005	Rick Wakeman
2004	Rick Schroder

Governor's Award
Year	Winner
2009	Dixie Carter
2008	William H. Macy
2007	Steve Oedekerk
2005	Cary Brokaw

Coleman Sinking Creek Award
Year	Winner
2009	Les Blank

=== 2010 winners ===
In 2010 edition, the following prizes have been assigned.

==== Features ====
Category	Winner	Movie
Bridgestone Narrative Competition Grand Jury Prize	Valeriy Todorovskiy	Hipsters
Bridgestone Grand Jury Prize for Best Actor in Narrative Feature	Anton Shagin	Hipsters
Bridgestone Grand Jury Prize for Best Actress in Narrative Feature	Paprika Steen	Applause
Southwest Audience Award for Best Narrative Feature	Radu Mihaileanu	The Concert
Documentary Channel Grand Jury Prize for Best Documentary Feature	Marshall Curry	Racing Dreams
Documentary Channel Audience Award for Best Documentary	Jim Bigham	For Once in My Life
Documentary Channel Audience Award for Best Documentary	Leanne Pooley	The Topp Twins: Untouchable Girls
New Directors Competition Grand Jury Prize	Michael Mohan	One Too Many Mornings
New Directors Competition Grand Jury Prize for Best Actor	Anthony Deptula	One Too Many Mornings
New Directors Competition Grand Jury Prize for Best Actress	Eileen Nicholas	Bomber
Gibson Impact of Music Award	Jim Bigham	For Once in My Life
Naxos Award for Best Music in A Feature Film	Konstantin Meladze	Hipsters
Ground Zero Tennessee Spirit Award for Best Feature	Brent Stewart	The Colonel's Bride
Bridgestone Narrative Competition Grand Jury Prize - Honorable Mention	Bruce Webb	The Be All and End All
Documentary Channel Grand Jury Prize for Best Documentary Feature - Honorable Mention	Taggart Siegel	Queen of the Sun
New Directors Grand Jury Prize - Honorable Mention	Paul Cotter	Bomber
Gibson Impact of Music Award - Honorable Mention	Bruce Bryant	For the Sake of the Song: The Story of Anderson Fair
Bridgestone Narrative Competition Grand Jury Prize - Honorable Mention	Bruce Webb	The Be All and End All

==== Shorts ====
Category	Winner	Movie
Ground Zero Tennessee Spirit Award for Best Narrative Short	Clay Jeter	5 Dollars
Ground Zero Tennessee Spirit Award for Best Documentary Short	Jonathan Epstein	I Am A Man: from Memphis, A Lesson in Life
Documentary Channel Award for Best Short Documentary	Tim Rauch and Mike Rauch	Q&A
Documentary Channel Award for Best Short Documentary - Honorable Mention	T.G. Herrington	Mr. Okra
Vanderbilt Golden Opportunity Award for Best College Student Short	Giacomo Cimini	The City in the Sky
Vanderbilt Golden Opportunity Award for Best College Student Short - Honorable Mention	Michael Rochford	Carpet Kingdom
Best Animated Short	Chris Landreth	The Spine
Best Animated Short - Honorable Mention	Nick Cross	Yellow Cake
Best Experimental Short	Joseph Ernst	Feeder
Best Live Action Short	Jamie Travis	The Armoire
Best Live Action Short - Honorable Mention	Roland Honeycutt Jr.	Dwight David Honeycutt for Conway School Board
Best Young Filmmaker	Edward Heffernan	The Letter

==== Special ====
Category	Winner	Movie
Special Jury Prize for Remarkably Weaving Documentary and Narrative Footage into a Subtly Moving Whole	Davey Frankel and Rasselas Lakew	The Athlete (Atletu)
Special Jury Prize for Bravery in Storytelling	Dean Hamer	Out in the Silence
Special Jury Prize for Artistic Perseverance through Commercial Adversities	Clark Stiles	Don't Quit Your Daydream
NAHCC Award for Best Hispanic Filmmaker	Javier Fuentes-León	Undertow
Best GLBT Film	Leanne Pooley	The Topp Twins: Untouchable Girls
Mike Curb Career Achievement Award for Film Music	Carter Burwell	
2010 President's Impact Award	Adrian Grenier	
Coleman Sinking Creek Award	Steve James	
Governor's Award	Watkins College of Art, Design & Film	
Nashville Public Television Human Spirit Award	Peter Wiedensmith	Raw Faith
Rosetta Miller-Perry Award for Best Black Filmmaker	Mario Van Peebles	Black, White and Blues
Best Film by a Woman Director	Jac Schaeffer	TiMER
Film Musicians Secondary Market Fund Best Director/Composer Collaboration	Mario Van Peebles/Tree Adams	Black, White and Blues
