= Louise Dahl-Wolfe: Painting with Light =

- Screenshot
- Directed by: Tom Neff
- Written by: Tom Neff
- Produced by: Tom Neff; Madeline Bell; Louise LeQuire
- Starring: Louise Dahl-Wolfe; Lauren Bacall
- Cinematography: Tom Neff
- Edited by: Barry Rubinow
- Music by: John Rosasco
- Distributed by: Image productions
- Release date: 1999
- Running time: 30 minutes
- Country: United States
- Language: English

Louise Dahl-Wolfe: Painting with Light is a 1999 documentary film about Louise Dahl-Wolfe, an important woman in the history of photography. It was written and directed by Tom Neff, and produced by Neff and Madeline Bell, who previously collaborated on the Oscar nominated short-documentary Red Grooms: Sunflower in a Hothouse (1986).

== Synopsis ==
This short documentary film on the life of Louise Dahl-Wolfe draws upon her art and her personality. The documentary reviews how Dahl-Wolfe "discovered" Lauren Bacall, who at the time was a young actress (seventeen years-of-age) and worked as a model. It was Dahl-Wolfe's photos of Bacall that film producer Harry Warner saw, and subsequently asked Bacall that she come to Hollywood for a screen test. As a result, Bacall was cast opposite Humphrey Bogart in the film To Have and Have Not (1944).

Dahl-Wolfe also photographed: Tallulah Bankhead, Spencer Tracy, Eudora Welty, Paul Robeson, Bette Davis, and others.

== Background ==
The documentary took over ten years to complete and features the only surviving modern footage of Dahl-Wolfe, including extensive interviews.

== Interviews ==
- Louise Dahl-Wolfe
- Lauren Bacall
- Babs Simpson

== Distribution ==
The film has been shown on selected PBS television stations and was the first original production of the new digital channel: DOC: The Documentary Channel and was screened at the Bel Air Film Festival.
