= Louise Dahl-Wolfe =

American photographer (1895–1989)

- Louise Dahl-Wolfe
- Born: Louise Emma Augusta Dahl; November 19, 1895; San Francisco, California, U.S.
- Died: December 11, 1989 (aged 94); Allendale, New Jersey, U.S.
- Education: California School of Fine Arts
- Known for: Photography
- Spouse: Meyer Wolfe (m. 1928; died 1985)

Louise Emma Augusta Dahl-Wolfe (November 19, 1895 – December 11, 1989) was an American photographer. She is known primarily for her work for Harper's Bazaar, in association with fashion editor Diana Vreeland. At Harper's Bazaar she pioneered a new standard in color photography.

== Background ==
Louise Emma Augusta Dahl was born November 19, 1895, in San Francisco, California, to Norwegian immigrant parents; she was the youngest of three daughters. In 1914, she began her studies at the California School of Fine Arts (now the San Francisco Institute of Art), where she studied design and color with Rudolph Schaeffer, and painting with Frank Van Sloan. She took life drawing, anatomy, figure composition courses and other subjects over the next six years. After graduating, Dahl worked in designing electric signs and interiors. "That's when I became interested in photography", she said, "because I was so bored". In 1921, Dahl met with photographer Anne Brigman, who inspired her to take up photography. Her first dark-room enlarger was a makeshift one she built herself, which used a tin can, an apple crate, and a part of a Ghirardelli chocolate box for a reflector. She studied design, decoration and architecture at Columbia University, New York in 1923. Following the death of her mother in a car accident in 1926, from 1927 to 1928, Dahl traveled in Europe and North Africa with photographer Consuelo Kanaga, who furthered her interest in photography. While on her travels she met the American sculptor Meyer Wolfe. They married in 1928 and he constructed the backgrounds of many of her photos. Dahl-Wolfe shared her husband's interest in sculptural form and from the 1920s, her photographs demonstrate a concern with architecture, antiquity and negative space. Her first published photograph, known as Tennessee Mountain Woman, was published in November 1933 under the title The Smoky Mountaineer in Vanity Fair (U.S. magazine 1913–36).

== Career ==
In the early 1930s, Dahl-Wolfe and Wolfe moved briefly to Tennessee, where she honed her photographic skills on local subjects including the Tennessee neighbour featured in Tennessee Mountain Woman. After several months in East Tennessee in the Smoky Mountains, the couple moved to New York, in 1933. From 1933 to 1960, Dahl-Wolfe operated a New York City photographic studio on the corner of 6th Avenue and 57th. From there she did freelance advertising and fashion work for stores including Bonwit Teller and Saks Fifth Avenue. From 1936 to 1958 she was a staff fashion photographer at Harper's Bazaar. She produced portrait and fashion photographs totaling 86 covers, 600 color pages and countless black-and-white shots.

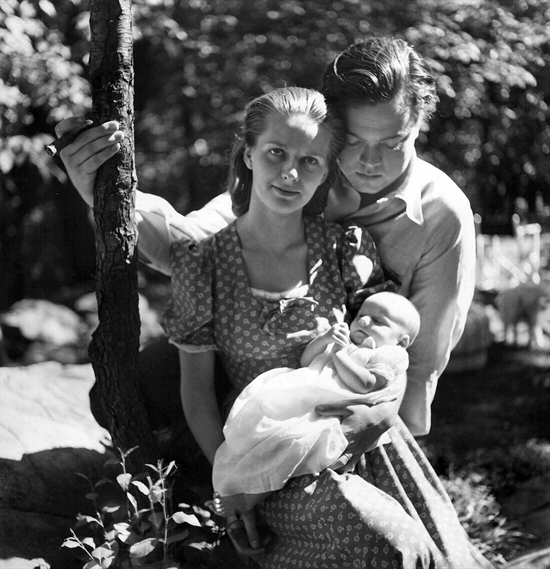
Photograph of Orson Welles and his family taken by Dahl-Wolfe, published in Harper's Bazaar

She preferred portraiture to fashion photography. Notable portraits include: Mae West, Vivien Leigh, Cecil Beaton, Eudora Welty, W. H. Auden, Christopher Isherwood, Orson Welles, Carson McCullers, Edward Hopper, Colette and Josephine Baker. She is known for her role in the discovery of a teenage Lauren Bacall whom she photographed for the March 1943 cover of Harper's Bazaar. One of her favourite subjects was the model Mary Jane Russell, who is estimated to have appeared in about thirty percent of Dahl-Wolfe's photographs. She was a great influence on photographers Irving Penn and Richard Avedon. One of her assistants was fashion and celebrity photographer, Milton H. Greene.

In 1950, she was selected for "America's Outstanding Woman Photographers" in the September issue of Foto. From 1958 until her retirement in 1960, Dahl-Wolfe worked as a freelance photographer for Vogue, Sports Illustrated, and other periodicals.

Dalhl-Wolfe lived many of her later years in Nashville, Tennessee. She died in New Jersey of pneumonia in 1989. The full archive of Dahl-Wolfe's work is located at the Center for Creative Photography (CCP) at the University of Arizona in Tucson, which also manages the copyright of her work.

In 1999, her work was the subject of a documentary film entitled Louise Dahl-Wolfe: Painting with Light. The film featured the only surviving modern footage of Dahl-Wolfe, including extensive interviews. It was written and directed by Tom Neff, edited by Barry Rubinow and produced by Neff and Madeline Bell.

== Style ==
Among the celebrated fashion photographers of the 20th century, Louise Dahl-Wolfe was an innovator and influencer who significantly contributed to the fashion world. She was most widely known for her work with Harper's Bazaar. Dahl-Wolfe was considered a pioneer of the 'female gaze' in the fashion industry and credited for creating a new image of strong, independent American women during World War II.

From 1943, Dahl-Wolfe introduced the "New American Look" to fashion photography, which Vicki Goldberg describes as "all clean hair, glowing skin and a figure both lithe and strong". Dahl-Wolfe was known for taking photographs outdoors, with natural light in distant locations from South America to Africa in what became known as "environmental" fashion photography. The outdoor settings helped to evoke "a mood of freedom and optimism" associated with women's liberation. Her photographs brought a new naturalism to fashion photography which had previously been dominated by a stiff and haughty "European" or "Germanic" studio style. Dahl-Wolfe described it as "that heavy, heavy look, with everybody looking very clumsy". Her methodology in using natural sunlight and shooting outdoors became the industry standard even now.

Her models appear to pose candidly, almost as if Dahl-Wolfe had just walked in on them. In fact the poses are highly, constructed with an "almost abstract formal perfection" which she credited partly to the influence of Diaghilev's Ballets Russes. Dahl-Wolfe innovatively used color in photography and mainly concerned with the qualities of natural lighting, composition, and balance. Compared to other photographers at the time who were using red undertones, Dahl-Wolfe opted for cooler hues and also corrected her own proofs, with one example of her pulling proofs repeatedly to change a sofa's color from green to a dark magenta.

=== World War II ===
When the Nazi occupation of Paris began on 14 June 1940, the Fashion Group in the city of New York promoted and protected the business of fashion, called a meeting to discuss the impact would have on American commerce. Having just recovered from the economic devastation of the Great Depression, the fashion manufactures being cut off from French designs. Some were hesitant to continue without the guideline of Europe, but many were decided to survive through the war by promoting a unique “American Look.” Louise Dahl-Wolfe was characterized by the "American Look," which set a beauty standard and trend in fashion.

According to photography historian Terrence Pepper, Dahl-Wolfe was among the most significant female fashion photographers of the early 20th century. Fashion curator Valerie Steele noted that the vitality of her work contributed substantially to the development of the "American look.

In 1943, President Franklin D. Roosevelt proclaimed the whole month of March as “Red Cross Month,” and the campaign raised $125 million war fund. This campaign demanded the most substantial amount of money in American history. Alongside with the tough circumstance, contemporary American women and professionals in the fashion industry, joined together to form a new style.

== Selected works ==
=== Harper's Bazaar cover, March 1943 ===
Dahl-Wolfe dedicated to promoting patriotism in fashion in the World War II era. Her photography highlights the implications of World War II in the American fashion industry. The Harper's Bazaar cover, March 1943, was one of the iconic photographs from Louise Dahl-Wolfe. The cover shows a young lady in front of the reception of American Red Cross Blood Donation clinic. She is styling chicly in an elegant navy suit, white blouse, black gloves, a cloche hat with long waves in her hair and holding a red bag with matching lipstick. The young woman looks either waiting to go inside to donate or about to leave the Red Cross blood donor room. The expression on her face is nonchalant with a suggestion that she does not attend the blood donation clinic regularly. Her eyes are empty. She may be disappointed or sad or helpless just as any other American woman knowing the reality is no one can escape. The audience can sense the uncertainty in the air of the time from her expression.

At the height of World War II, women had been left at home after their male counterparts were sent abroad to fight. The woman in the cover represented all American women who determined to do their part to contribute to the war. American women in World War II were no longer the delicate creature surrounded by flowers as seen in previous covers, but responsible individuals with the ability to do their bit of help. Harper's Bazaar cover from March 1943, on the other hand, shows the power that women have gained in society. The cover is a mirror up to its audience, a reflection of the women, who had entered the workforce for the first time, who became wartime brides when they married their soldier, who take care family and just an occasional letter from a loved one to lament over. The model in the cover was 18-year-old Lauren Bacall, who was a successful actress in Hollywood. According to David Thomson, it was Diana Vreeland, who worked for both Harper's Bazaar and Vogue, who discovered Lauren Bacall and placed her on the cover of Harper's Bazaar.
