= Beatrice Wood: Mama of Dada =

- DVD cover
- Directed by: Tom Neff
- Screenplay by: Tom Neff
- Produced by: Olavee Martin; Tom Neff; Diandra Douglas; Amie Knox
- Starring: Beatrice Wood
- Cinematography: Steven Wacks
- Edited by: Barry Rubinow
- Music by: John Rosasco
- Distributed by: PBS
- Release dates: March 15, 1993 (Los Angeles); October 1, 1993 (PBS, West Coast)
- Running time: 55 minutes
- Country: United States
- Language: English
- Budget: $500,000

Beatrice Wood: Mama of Dada is a 1993 documentary film written and directed by Tom Neff about the avant-garde Dada artist Beatrice Wood.

== Synopsis ==
The documentary details the life and work of the artist Beatrice Wood, particularly her experiences as one of the members of the art movement known as Dada during the 1910s. It also recounts friendships with Marcel Duchamp and Henri-Pierre Roché whose book, and subsequent film Jules and Jim, was no doubt inspired by the relationship between the three of them, but actually based on a later relationship between Roché, Helen Grund and the German writer Franz Hessel.

Various art consultants, artists, and owners of art galleries who have exhibited Wood's art consulted on the film and were interviewed.

== Interviews ==
- Beatrice Wood - Artist
- Francis Naumann - Art Scholar and Art Dealer
- Rupert Pole - Literary Executor
- Lee Waisler - Artist
- Garth Clark - Art Gallery Owner

== Background ==
The film, shot in 16mm, premiered on March 3, 1993 at the Pacific Design Center in Los Angeles to coincide with Wood's 100th birthday. According to the Los Angeles Times, guests that celebrated Wood's birthday and viewed the film included Danny DeVito, Jack Nicholson, Michael Medavoy, David Crosby, Stephen Stills, Tippi Hedren, Leonard Nimoy, Estelle Getty, Paula Prentiss, Deborah Raffin, and others.

== Distribution ==
The documentary was broadcast on PBS on the American West Coast on October 1, 1993 and was shown in the Spring of 1994 on the East Coast.

== Reception ==
=== Critical response ===
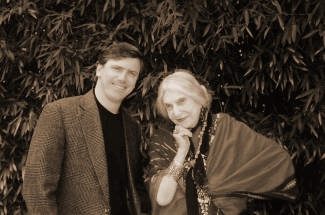
Tom Neff and Beatrice Wood.

When shown on PBS, the Los Angeles Times lauded the film and wrote, "Making a documentary about artist Beatrice Wood that is as full of life as its subject is probably impossible. But producer-director Tom Neff's energetic Beatrice Wood: Mama of Dada, which airs at 10 tonight on KCET-TV Channel 28, comes as close as you could ask...Among the most compelling sequences are those that show Woods' autobiographical drawings and paintings. These colorful images are full of the same passion and sensuality that still emanates from the tiny, plucky sari-clad artist whom we now see opening up a freshly fired kiln full of pottery or chatting about the joys of men. If she were Japanese, as one of the interviewees in the film points out, Wood would have long ago been dubbed a living national treasure. As is, at least we've got the worthy tribute that is Beatrice Wood: Mama of Dada by which to know this incredible woman."

Variety film critic, Tony Scott, praised the production values of the film and wrote, "A loving look at a 100-year-old Ojai potter-painter should give plenty of hope to those whose lust for life may have faded, joy to those who enjoy a good companion. Sensitively filmed, handsomely lit and expertly edited, the ode to Beatrice Wood shimmers in beauty... Wood herself is a charming, industrious, disciplined, amusing and independent figure who's still living a full life. One of the speakers proclaims, 'Beatrice keeps a wonderful child alive in her.' The spec has been awarded the Cine Golden Eagle. Archival photos and paintings, historians and curators help fill out the picture, and John Rosasco has supplied a splendid score."

=== Awards ===
Wins

- CINE: Golden Eagle, 1992.
- Columbus International Film & Video Festival, Bronze Plaque Award, 1993.
- Sichuan Television Festival, Golden Panda Award, Chengdu, China, 1993. Of note: the film was the first American documentary to win the award.
