= Rock Your Baby (Wanda Jackson song) =

Single by Wanda Jackson
- B-side: "Sinful Heart"
- Released: November 1958
- Recorded: April 1958
- Studio: Capitol Studios
- Genre: Rockabilly; rock and roll
- Length: 1:43
- Label: Capitol
- Songwriter: Wanda Jackson
- Producer: Ken Nelson

Wanda Jackson singles chronology
"Mean Mean Man" (1958)	"Rock Your Baby" (1958)	"You've Turned to a Stranger" (1959)

"Rock Your Baby" is a song written and originally recorded by American singer, Wanda Jackson. The recording was among Jackson's earliest rock and roll songs and among the first she ever wrote. It was released as a single by Capitol Records in November 1958 but failed to become a commercial success. However, it ended up becoming one of Jackson's best-known rock and roll songs from her career in the years that followed.

== Background ==
Wanda Jackson formed a singing career by recording in the genres of country and gospel. However, she most notable for her string of rock and roll recordings in the 1950s, which gave her the nickname, "The Queen of Rockabilly". While still in high school, she had first commercial success with "You Can't Have My Love", a duet with Billy Gray that made the US country top-10 in 1954. Around 1955-56, Jackson toured with Elvis Presley, who inspired her to try recording rock and roll (also called Rockabilly). She then signed with Capitol Records and began releasing a string of Rockabilly songs.

== Composition and recording ==
In the 1950s, there were a limited number of rock songs written for women to sing, prompting Jackson to write her own material. Jackson had been writing several country songs and when struggling to find rock material, her father encouraged her to write them herself. "He showed me the beat he had in his head, and that got me started. Pretty soon, I realized I could do it," she recalled in her autobiography. According to Jackson, "Rock Your Baby" was the second Rockabilly song she wrote. Its inspiration stemmed from her love of dancing when going out on dates with men. "Rock Your Baby" was recorded in April 1958 at Capitol Studios in Hollywood, California. The session was produced by Ken Nelson who produced all of Jackson's Capitol sessions in the 1950s. Four additional sides were cut at the same session including "Mean Mean Man". It also features a vocal chorus shouting the phrase "all night long" after Jackson's voice, along with a "fingerpicked guitar solo", according to author Craig Morrison.

== Critical reception and impact ==
"Rock Your Baby" was released as a single by Capitol Records in November 1958 and was distributed as a seven-inch vinyl disc. It featured a B-side titled "Sinful Heart". Despite later becoming a signature tune for Jackson, it failed to gain commercial attention in its initial release, which was similar to most of her Rockabilly singles from the 1950s. She later referred to this period of her career as a "commercial dry spell" in her autobiography. "Rock Your Baby" was reviewed in the years following its original release and its impact on Rockabilly has been discussed by writers. Billboard magazine reviewed the original 1958 single release and wrote, "Miss Jackson turns rockabilly on this side and an interesting upbeat effort." Author Michael James Roberts credited Capitol's session musicians in helping to make "Rock Your Baby" into "some of her best records" of her career. Authors Mary Bufwack and Robert Oermann cited "Rock Your Baby" and her other Rockabilly records as best-capturing "the elemental, low-class wildness of this music better than any other female of her day."

== Track listing ==
7" vinyl single

- "Rock Your Baby" – 1:43
- "Sinful Heart" – 2:34
