= Mark Doyle =

Mark Doyle may refer to:

- Mark Doyle (journalist) (1958/1959–2026), British journalist
- Mark Doyle (footballer) (born 1998), Irish footballer
- Mark Doyle (rower) (born 1963), Australian rower
