= Mónica Esmeralda León =

Mexican actress and filmmaker

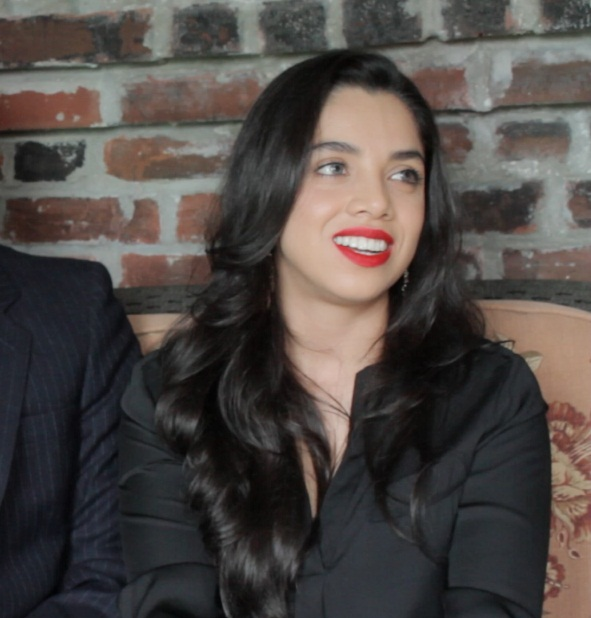
- Monica Esmeralda Leon at Black Ruby interview (2016)
- Born: Michoacán, Mexico
- Citizenship: Mexican, American
- Occupations: Actress; producer; director
- Years active: 2013–present
- Website: www.avefenixpictures.com

Mónica Esmeralda León (Michoacán, July 20, 1991) is a Mexican film actress, producer and director. León is also the founder of Ave Fenix Pictures in Chicago and Los Angeles, and created the La Raza filmmaking concept.

León is multilingual and speaks Spanish, English and Italian.

== Early life ==
León was born in Michoacán, Mexico. She moved to Chicago at the age of 16, where she worked helping youth at risk.

== Career ==
León wanted to show the beauty and violence inside her neighborhood through the medium of film. León became the executive producer of Adios Vaya Con Dios, which incorporated gang members and street artists into the filmmaking process. León dedicated the director title to the community using the term La raza.

León worked as a music producer combining different artists from around the globe, including the United Kingdom and Mexico, incorporating them into the soundtrack of Adios Vaya Con Dios. The film was first to integrate a British and Mexican rock soundtrack over a Latino urbanized film. Adios Vaya Con Dios was the Official Selection at Bel Air Film Festival being Runner-up for Best Audience Feature Film, and nominations for Best Actor, Best Screenplay and Best Director. León also shared the nomination for Best Director with La raza.

León founded the first Latino film studio in Chicago with Zachary Laoutides, called Ave Fenix Pictures. She is also the first Latina and immigrant to found a film studio in Chicago.

León's second film is Arise from Darkness. She served as the film's music supervisor and acted in the film. It was ranked number one in the 10 Best Supernatural Horror Movies Of The Last Decade, Ranked According to IMDb Rating.

In 2017, León premiered the film Black Ruby at the London Independent Film Awards. The film earned nominations in London with Leon sharing in Best Director and Best Feature Film. She won Best Film at the Los Angeles Film Awards. The film was the first movie shot with the iPhone 7.

In 2020, León's studio Ave Fenix Pictures announced the dramatic thriller Where Sweet Dreams Die, directed by Mirza Esho and featuring actors Zachary Laoutides, Jaime Zevallos, and Alexander James Rodriguez. The film wrapped shooting in Chicago and New York in March 2022.

== Personal life ==
León is active in community outreach and continues higher education in languages and history.

== Filmography ==
=== Films ===
Year	Title	Role
2016	Adios Vaya Con Dios	Producer
2017	Arise from Darkness	Jessica
2017	Black Ruby	Producer
2024	Where Sweet Dreams Die (upcoming film)	Producer

=== Awards and nominations ===
Year	Title	Role	Notes
2014	Adios Vaya Con Dios	Executive Producer	Bel Air Film Festival Runner up Best Audience Feature; Bel Air Film Festival Nominated Best Jury Feature Film Directing
2016	Arise from Darkness	Jessica	Nominated Film Invasion L.A. Best Director; Nominated Film Invasion L.A. Best Narrative Feature; Also, Producer/Director
2017	Black Ruby	Executive Producer / Also, Producer/Director	Nominated London Independent Film Awards Best Director Nominated London Independent Film Awards Best Feature film Nominated London Independent Film Awards Best Foreign Feature film Nominated London Independent Film Awards Best Trailer Also, Producer/Director Nominated Rome Film Awards Best Feature Film Nominated Rome Film Awards Best Director Nominated Rome Film Awards Best International Film
2018	Black Ruby	Executive Producer / Also, Producer/Director	Winner Los Angeles Film Forum Awards Best Feature Film
