= Zachary Laoutides =

American actor and screenwriter

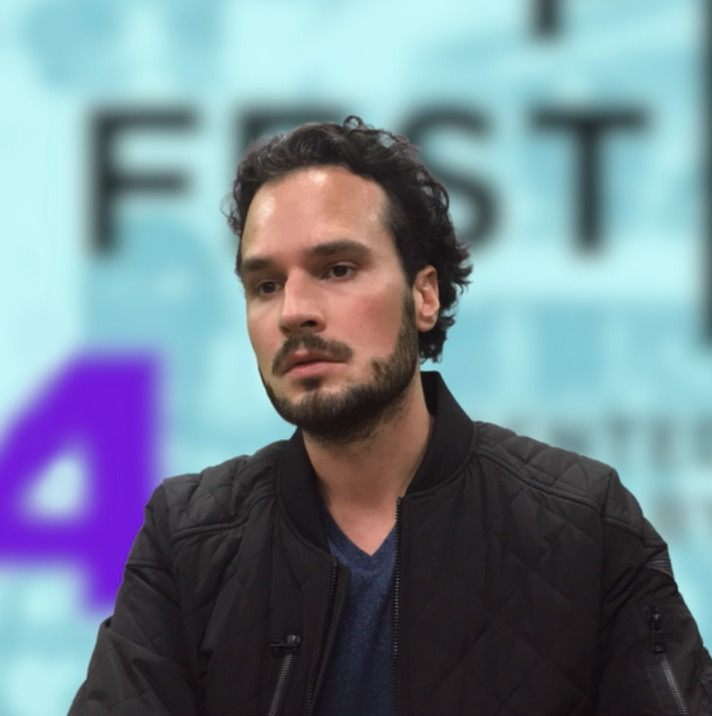
- Laoutides in 2019
- Born: December 13, 1986 (age 39); Chicago, Illinois, US
- Occupations: Actor; screenwriter; filmmaker
- Years active: 2005–present

Zachary Laoutides (born December 13, 1986) is an American actor, screenwriter and filmmaker from Chicago, Illinois. In 2014, he co-founded independent film company Ave Fenix Pictures, originator of an art house filmmaking style known as "la raza". Inspired by La raza cósmica, this technique involves working together with the urban youth in recreating their own stories, regardless of film background.

His first starring role was in the film Adiós Vaya con Dios (2014), which earned him nominations for Best Actor and Best Screenplay at the Bel Air Film Festival. He also wrote and acted in Ave Fenix Pictures' Arise from Darkness (2018), based on the story of psychic Lázaro Rubén Torres, and Black Ruby (2019), claimed to be the "first feature to be shot on an iPhone 7."

== Early life ==
Laoutides was born in 1986 in Chicago where he studied media and journalism. He spent his early years working in community outreach and introducing the performing arts to youth at risk. He resides in Chicago and is still active in community outreach working with Mónica Esmeralda León.

He is of Sephardic, Greek, Turkish and Slovenian heritage. His Eastern European ancestry were ethnic minorities from the Austrian Empire and Russia Empire; Slovenian with some Polish and Scandinavian. His Jewish heritage traces back to Levite rabbinical families Halevi and Benveniste of the 11th to the 15th century in Barcelona. His background includes Moroccan Jewish, Indian Jewish and distant Latino roots from his father's grandmother

== Career ==
Laoutides's first role was in Adiós Vaya con Dios, released worldwide by Indican Pictures on January 19, 2016. Laoutides starred in the film and wrote the screenplay while living in an urban Latino neighborhood, about a half white and half Mexican gang member trying to leave the barrio. Adiós Vaya con Dios was the first movie to use real gangs and streets artists. Laoutides was nominated as Best Actor and Best Screenplay writer at the Bel Air Film Festival where Adiós Vaya con Dios earned an Official Selection and Runner-up for Best Audience Feature Film.

He was also the finalist out of Chicago for Simon Fuller's XIX Entertainment nationwide talent search for new actors.

Laoutides was a musician on the Adiós Vaya con Dios soundtrack, composing and producing several songs. The movie was first to integrate a British and Mexican rock soundtrack over a Latino urbanized film.

In 2014 Laoutides co-founded Ave Fenix Pictures with Mónica Esmeralda León. Ave Fenix Pictures is the first Latino film studio in Chicago.

In 2016 Laoutides wrote and starred in Arise from Darkness, an official selection at Film Invasion L.A. based on true events in the early life of psychic Lázaro Rubén Torres, who was declared clinically dead five times . Laoutides composed and produced several tracks for the movie's soundtrack. Laoutides was nominated for Best Screenplay and shared in the nominations for Best Feature Film and Best Director. The film received three four stars reviews from Examiner.com, Inquisitr, and The Levity Ball, with critics comparing Laoutides performance to the opening of Javier Bardem's character Anton Chigurh in No Country for Old Men (film). The film was ranked number one in the 10 Best Supernatural Horror Movies Of The Last Decade, Ranked According to IMDb Rating.

In 2017 Laoutides premiered the film Black Ruby at the London Independent Film Awards. The company claimed it was the first to be shot with an iPhone 7. He earned nine nominations in London and Rome. His performance was compared with Montgomery Clift and Marlon Brando.

In September 2020, Laoutides was cast along with Jaime Zevallos and Alexander James Rodriguez in the upcoming film "Where Sweet Dreams Die." The movie completed shooting in Chicago and New York in March 2022.

== Filmography ==
Film
Year	Title	Role	Notes
2006	Let's Go to Prison	Mexican gang member	
2016	Adiós Vaya con Dios	Rory King	Nominated—Bel Air Film Festival: Best Actor; Nominated—Bel Air Film Festival: Best Screenplay
2018	Arise from Darkness	Lázaro	Nominated—Film Invasion L.A.: Best Actor; Nominated—Film Invasion L.A.: Best Screenplay
2019	Black Ruby	Louis Katz	Nominated—London Independent Film Festival: Best Director; Nominated—London Independent Film Festival: Best Actor; Nominated—London Independent Film Festival: Best Screenplay; Nominated—London Independent Film Festival: Best Feature Film; Nominated—London Independent Film Festival: Best International Actor; Nominated—London Independent Film Festival: Best Foreign Feature Film Nominated—Rome Film Awards: Best Actor; Nominated—Rome Film Awards: Best International Film; Nominated—Rome Film Awards: Best Director; Nominated—Rome Film Awards: Best Feature; Nominated—Rome Film Awards: Best Writer; Nominated—Rome Film Awards: Best Foreign Actor Los Angeles Film Forum; Won—Los Angeles Film Forum: Best Actor; Won—Los Angeles Film Forum: Independent Spirit Award; Won—Los Angeles Film Forum: Best Adapted Screenplay Feature
2024	Where Sweet Dreams Die	Unknown	Upcoming Film

Television
Year	Title	Role	Notes
2005–06	Prison Break	Prisoner	
2006	Triple Cross: Bin Laden's Spy in America	Wadih el-Hage	National Geographic TV documentary
