= Country Music: The Spirit of America =

- Theatrical release poster
- Directed by: Steven Goldmann; Keith Melton; Tom Neff
- Written by: Tom Neff
- Produced by: Randy Scruggs; Tom Neff
- Starring: Emily Lalande
- Narrated by: Hal Holbrook
- Cinematography: Steven D. Smith; Rodney Taylor
- Edited by: Barry Rubinow
- Music by: Randy Scruggs
- Distributed by: IMAX; Giant Screen Films
- Release date: June 2, 2003 (United States)
- Running time: 45 minutes
- Country: United States
- Language: English

Country Music: The Spirit of America is a 2003 documentary film, in the IMAX format, written and co-produced by Tom Neff and co-directed by Neff, Steven Goldmann and Keith Melton. Randy Scruggs was also a producer on the film and wrote the music score. The film traces the history of the United States in the 20th Century through country music, and is also known as Our Country.

== Cast ==
- Hannah Swanson as Time Traveling Sprite
- Emily Lalande as Time Traveling Sprite
- Austin Stout as Austin
- Benton Jennings as Comic Old West Cowboy
- Tommy Barnes as Stage Manager
- Terry Ike Clanton as Crazed Prisoner
- Tony Nudo as Joe, man at the train station
- Jaclynn Tiffany Brown as Fresh Faced Teen

=== Interviews and music performers ===
- Trace Adkins
- Alabama
- Jessica Andrews
- Béla Fleck
- Guy Clark
- Charlie Daniels
- Joe Diffie
- Crystal Gayle
- Vince Gill
- Billy Gilman
- Hal Holbrook as narrator
- Alan Jackson
- Alison Krauss
- Lyle Lovett
- Loretta Lynn
- Kathy Mattea
- Martina McBride
- Roger McGuinn
- Leigh Nash
- Randy Owen
- Dolly Parton
- Minnie Pearl - archival
- Earl Scruggs
- Marty Stuart
- Pam Tillis
- Ernest Tubb - archival
- Porter Wagoner
- Lee Ann Womack

== Reception ==
When the film was released, Jane Sumner, film critic for The Dallas Morning News, lauded the film, and wrote, "It's been three years coming. But now that it's here, the IMAX film Our Country, originally titled Twang, makes a rousing addition to this year's State Fair of Texas ... Written and produced by Tom Neff, who produced the six-part TV miniseries America's Music: The Roots of Country for TBS, the documentary celebrates country music as a mirror of the American experience across 90 years ... Vintage photos, archival news footage (including a shot of O. J. Simpson trying on that pesky glove) and Mr. Neff's intelligent, lyrical commentary, narrated by Hal "Deep Throat" Holbrook, trace the history of country music as it parallels the nation's."

== See also ==
- America's Music: The Roots of Country
- List of IMAX films
