= Shake Hands with the Devil: The Journey of Roméo Dallaire =

2004 Canadian documentary film

- Theatrical release poster
- Directed by: Peter Raymont
- Story by: Roméo Dallaire
- Produced by: Executive Producers: Tom Neff; Producers: Peter Raymont; Lindalee Tracey
- Starring: Roméo Dallaire
- Cinematography: John Westheuser
- Edited by: Michèle Hozer
- Music by: Mark Korven
- Distributed by: Canadian Broadcasting Corporation; California Newsreel (United States)
- Release dates: September 12, 2004 (Canada); March 11, 2005 (United States)
- Running time: 91 minutes (English); 56 minutes (French)
- Country: Canada
- Language: English
- Box office: $68,249 (domestic)

Shake Hands with the Devil: The Journey of Roméo Dallaire is a 2004 Canadian documentary film about the 1994 genocide in Rwanda. It was directed by Peter Raymont and inspired by the book Shake Hands with the Devil: The Failure of Humanity in Rwanda (2003), by now-retired Canadian Lieutenant-General Roméo Dallaire. It was co-produced by the Canadian Broadcasting Corporation, the Société Radio-Canada, White Pine Pictures, and DOC: The Documentary Channel.

== Synopsis ==
Between April and June 1994, an estimated 800,000 Rwandans were killed in 100 days. Most of the dead were Tutsis by the hands of the Hutus. The genocide began when Rwandan president Juvénal Habyarimana's plane was shot down above Kigali airport on April 6, 1994.

Canadian Armed Forces General Roméo Dallaire was put in charge of a United Nations peacekeeping force during this 1994 genocide. His proposal called for 5000 soldiers to permit orderly elections and the return of the refugees. The soldiers were never supplied and the killing began.

The documentary tells the story of the now-retired Dallaire, and shows his return to Rwanda after ten years. It features interviews with Stephen Lewis and BBC reporter Mark Doyle, among others.

== Interviews ==
- General Roméo Dallaire
- Stephen Lewis
- Mark Doyle
- Gerald Caplan
- Paul Kagame
- Major Brent Beardsley
- Bonaventure Niyibizi
- Rosette Musabe

== Distribution ==
In Canada, a shortened English version of the 91-minute film was broadcast on CBC Television and CBC Newsworld on January 31 and February 2, 2005, and, subsequently, via CBC On Demand.

A 91-minute and 56-minute English Versions; 56-minute French Version was released on DVD, Region 1 (North America).

The film had its American television premiere on DOC: The Documentary Channel.

== Critical reception ==
When the film opened in New York City, film critic Stephen Holden gave the film a positive review, and wrote, "The film ... is a respectful portrait of General Dallaire, now retired, who comes across as a thoughtful, resolute but profoundly shaken man, more philosopher than warrior ... If Terry George's wrenching film Hotel Rwanda and Raoul Peck's HBO movie Sometimes in April have already put a tragic human face on a catastrophe that the American mass media barely acknowledged while it was happening, Shake Hands With the Devil ratifies their horrifying visions. General Dallaire's descriptions of the sights, sounds, and smells of human butchery, as well as the movie's images of piles of dead bodies, severed limbs and rooms of skulls, are grimmer than anything seen in those films ... Beyond apportioning blame, Shake Hands With the Devil acknowledges that the capacity for evil is a human component. Under certain conditions, entire populations can lose their humanity and go berserk. With madness all around him, General Dallaire maintained his humanity and (just barely) his sanity."

Jonathan Curiel, staff writer for the San Francisco Chronicle, interviewed Dallaire when the film was released, and wrote, "Raymont's movie, Dallaire says, is another way to raise awareness about Rwanda's legacy. But whether he likes it or not, Shake Hands With the Devil is also a chance to peer into Dallaire's inner thoughts—to get to know a man who says he's not a hero but 'a humanist'. If history is best understood through the decisions of individual men and women, then Raymont's film lets audiences revisit the siege of Rwanda through the eyes of a retired officer (and newly appointed Canadian senator) who tried to prevent hell on earth."

== Awards ==
Wins

- Sundance Film Festival: Audience Award, World Cinema – Documentary, Peter Raymont; 2005.
- Directors Guild of Canada: DGC Team Award, Outstanding Team Achievement in a Documentary, Peter Raymont (director); 2005.
- Gemini Awards: Gemini, Best Picture Editing in a Documentary Program or Series, Michèle Hozer; 2005.
- Banff Television Festival: Banff Rockie Award, Best Feature Length Documentary, Best Canadian Program; 2005.
- Philadelphia Film Festival: Jury Award, Best Documentary, Peter Raymont; 2005.
- National Academy of Television Arts and Sciences: Emmy Award, Best Documentary, DOC: The Documentary Channel, Tom Neff and Jimmy Holcomb; 2006.
