= Frederic Remington: The Truth of Other Days =

- Marketing card
- Directed by: Tom Neff
- Written by: Louise LeQuire; Tom Neff
- Produced by: Executive Producer: Tom Neff; Producers: Madeline Bell; Karl Katz; Arnie Knox
- Starring: Gregory Peck; Ned Beatty
- Narrated by: Gregory Peck
- Edited by: Barry Rubinow
- Music by: John Rosasco
- Distributed by: American Masters (PBS)
- Release date: August 5, 1991 (United States)
- Running time: 60 minutes
- Country: United States
- Language: English

Frederic Remington: The Truth of Other Days is a 1991 documentary film of American Western artist Frederic Remington made for the PBS series American Masters. It was produced and directed by Tom Neff and written by Neff and Louise LeQuire. Actor Gregory Peck narrated the film and Ned Beatty was the voice of Remington when reading his correspondence.

The documentary was produced by the Metropolitan Museum of Art, New York; NHK Corporation (Japan); and Polaris Entertainment, Nashville, Tennessee. It was the first documentary to be filmed in High Definition Television (HDTV), but at the time it was years away from high-definition television broadcasting.

== Synopsis ==
This documentary of Frederic Remington reviews how the artist popularized the myths, legends, and images of the "Old West".

The film was filmed on location where Remington spent time, uses archival film and photographs, and has interviews with art scholars that create a framework to understand his artwork.

== Interviews ==
- Gregory Peck as narrator
- Ned Beatty as voice of Frederic Remington
- William Howze
- Lewis Sharp
- Brian W. Dippie
- Peter Hassrick

== Reception ==
=== Critical response ===
When the film was shown on PBS, Walter Goodman, television critic for The New York Times, liked the film, and wrote, "In these multi-cultural times, it may not come as unadulterated praise to credit someone with defining America's vision of the Old West, but Frederic Remington: The Truth of Other Days illuminates the artist's achievement without subjecting it to a test for political correctness. Setting Remington's paintings and sculptures against his own words, crisply delivered by Ned Beatty, the hourlong American Masters documentary, tonight at 9 on Channel 13, shows and tells how the Easterner helped create a Western myth that has not yet lost its power...Attention is drawn especially to the way the massed figures move on both canvas and screen, from upper right to lower left. Big men in a landscape of big nature was a steady theme of both the movie maker and the painter."

=== Awards ===
Wins

- CINE: CINE Golden Eagle, 1990.
