= Maria Soccor =

American actor

- Occupations: Actor, Director, Producer
- Years active: 1988–present

Maria Soccor is an American actor, director, and producer. Her acting credits include Another World (1998), Pizza My Heart (2005), K-Ville (2007), and NCIS: New Orleans (2015) as well as a number of short films and television films.

== Biography ==
=== Career beginnings ===
Soccor got her start at the age of 13 modeling in print ads for various beauty and Fortune 500 companies. In her senior year of high school, in 1992, she won first place in the annual national America's Junior Miss scholarship pageant as a representative from Essex County, New Jersey.

=== Acting ===
She studied acting in Orange, New Jersey at The Children's Matinee Workshop under Gwen Guthrie. She continued her acting studies under the late three-time Tony Award winner Uta Hagen before appearing on Broadway and in several Off-Broadway productions.

One of her first big roles was in Club XII, MC Lyte's Off-Broadway hip-hop rendering of Shakespeare's Twelfth Night. She returned to the New York stage in February 2019 to star in The Sandstorm, presented during the New York Theater Festival Winterfest.

In 2021, she starred as Aurora in the New Jersey production of Mannequin Diaries written by Brian Wiggins and directed by Tony Award winner Trazana Beverley. In 2024, Soccor returned to Mannequin Diaries in the role she originated as the show was adapted off-broadway and performed at the Errol Barrow Centre for Creative Imagination at the University of the West Indies in Saint Michael, Barbados.

=== Directing, producing, and more ===
In addition to acting, Soccor began directing and producing documentaries in 2009. In 2016, she directed Lords of BSV, which won 13 awards across the world, including Best Director of a Feature Documentary at the Madrid International Film Festival. In September of 2016, the film was chosen by Newark Mayor Ras Baraka to have a brief theatrical release after making its digital television debut on Red Bull TV. In 2018, she wrote, directed, and acted in Kicks, which was a Cannes Film Festival entry and won her Best Short Film Director at the Hell's Kitchen NYC Festival. In 2026, she produced the film Charlie and the Rocket Man, which premiered at the 2026 Montclair Film Festival.

She is currently in production on Tillie, Freestyle Music: The Legacy, Sybil in Her Own Words, and Gloss And Grit: The Man Who Made Art Pop under her production company Maria Soccor Productions.

In 2015, Soccor created a comic series called SPEAR, illustrated by artist Rolo Ledesma. It launched in October that year at New York Comic Con.

At the 82nd Venice International Film Festival, she launched and hosted 'Reel Women', a new annual event to spotlight and celebrate female filmmakers at the festival.

She is a member of the Film Fatales, Alliance of Women Directors, and New York Women in Film & Television organizations.

== Filmography ==
=== Film ===
Year	Title	Role	Notes
1998	Rounders	Atlantic City Call Girl	
1999	Behind Walls	Josie	Short
2004	The Cookout	Young Nettie	
2004	Coalition	Alex	
2005	The Signs of the Cross	Lourdes	
2005	Shadowboxer	Clayton's Girlfriend	
2005	Rose Woes and Joe's	Eileen Kenna	
2006	Last Request	Fran	
2007	Mattie Fresno and the Holoflux Universe	Gail	
2008	The Big Shot-Caller	Veronica Colucci	
2008	Cash Rules	Aria	Direct-to-video
2009	The Jacket	Carolina	Short
2009	The Don of 42nd Street	Angie	
2014	The Zombie's Daughter	Mara	Short
2014	Jersey Justice	Felix Romeo	
2015	The Expressionless	Diana	Short
2017	Light Withheld	Marie	Short
2018	Kicks	Gisela	Short, also wrote and directed
2020	Nick and Nicky	Brandy	
2025	Catch the Wind	Megan	Also executive producer
2025	The Elegant Dead: Trapped with Dolls	M	Short
2026	All That We Dream		Short, in post production

=== Television ===
Year	Title	Role	Notes
1998	Another World	Caroline	6 episodes
2001	Kitchen	Dama	Television film (PBS)
2003	Undefeated	Tropicana Hostess	Television film (HBO)
2004	Miracle Run	Amy / Medical Student	Television film (Lifetime Television)
2005	Pizza My Heart	Barker	Television film (ABC Family)
2007	K-Ville	Laurencia Leon	Episodes: "Cobb's Web", "Bedfellows"
2015	NCIS: New Orleans	Wife	Episodes: "Touched by the Sun", "Hail to The Chief"
2019	Bronx SIU	Mayor Molina	Episodes: "We Are SIU", "I Do"
2021	The Sync Report	Herself	Voice role
2022	Matt Rogers: Have You Heard of Christmas?	Mariah	TV special

=== Music videos ===
Year	Title	Artist	Role	Notes
2009	"Todo Eso E' Tuyo"	Magic Juan (featuring Doug E. Fresh)		
