= Herb Alpert: Music for Your Eyes =

- Promotional image
- Directed by: Tom Neff
- Written by: Tom Neff
- Produced by: Lois Riggins-Ezzell; Tom Neff
- Starring: Herb Alpert
- Cinematography: Steven D. Smith
- Edited by: Barry Rubinow
- Music by: Herb Alpert
- Distributed by: Tom Neff Productions
- Release date: April 30, 2002 (Lincoln Center)
- Running time: 26 minutes
- Country: United States
- Language: English
- Budget: $500,000

Herb Alpert: Music for Your Eyes is a 2002 American documentary film about the paintings and sculptures of musician and record producer Herb Alpert. It was written, produced and directed by Tom Neff. The soundtrack of the film is co-composed and performed by Alpert.

== Synopsis ==
This documentary explores Herb Alpert's abstract paintings and his more figurative bronze sculptures, focusing on the first major retrospective of his work given at the Tennessee State Museum. It shows how music has infused his paintings and sculptures through color, concept, and form.

The entire musical score to this visual film is composed and played by Herb Alpert, and his personality is probed through his artwork.

== Interviews ==
- Herb Alpert
- Lois Riggins-Ezzell, Executive Director, Tennessee State Museum in Nashville
- Phil Kreuger
- Peter Frank
- Lani Alpert Hall
- Kristan Marvell

== Background ==
The film is based on the museum exhibition, "Herb Alpert: Music for Your Eyes." The exhibition was on view at the museum in 2001 and features Herb Alpert's paintings and sculptures he created from 1978 to 2001.
