= Pizza My Heart (film) =

2005 American television film

- Directed by: Andy Wolk
- Starring: Shiri Appleby; Michael Badalucco; Eyal Podell
- Theme music composer: Jennie Muskett
- Country of origin: United States
- Original language: English

Production
- Producers: Richard D. Arredondo; Jane Goldenring

Original release
- Network: ABC Family
- Release: 2005

Pizza My Heart is a 2005 film directed by Andy Wolk and starring Shiri Appleby, Michael Badalucco, and Eyal Podell. The movie premiered July 24, 2005, on ABC Family. It tells the story of a son and daughter of two rival pizzeria owners who fall in love, much to the disapproval of both families. It is a modern retelling of Romeo and Juliet set in modern-day Verona, New Jersey with a brick wall between two sides.

== Cast (in alphabetical order) ==
=== The Prestolanis ===
- Shiri Appleby as Gina Prestolani
- Michael Badalucco as Lou Prestolani
- Joanna Canton as Annette Prestolani
- Ann Mahoney as Prestolani Cousin
- Natalia Nogulich as Mary Prestolani

=== The Montebellos ===
- Eyal Podell as Joe Montebello
- Rob Boltin as Nicky Montebello
- Gina Hecht as Gloria Montebello
- Dan Hedaya as Vinnie Montebello

=== The others ===
- Gary Desroche as Customer
- Matthew Dufour as Festival Patron
- Wayne Ferrara as Uncle Nat
- Larry Gamell Jr. as Firefighter
- Anthony Gangi as Fair Patron/Romantic Couple
- Vanessa Guild as Customer #1
- Bryan James Kitto as Antonio
- Cynthia LeBlanc as Fair goer
- Elton LeBlanc as Church Usher
- Don Lincoln as Carnival Vendor
- John Mese as Jean Paul Veber
- Gerald Moorman as Prestolani Delivery Boy
- Derek Morgan as Rouzan
- Wayne Morgan as Church Member
- William Ragsdale as Tommy
- Dane Rhodes as Blue-Collar Neighbor
- Mathilde Semmes as Festival Patron
- Maria Soccor as Barker
- Nick Spano as Carlo Delrio
- Deneen Tyler as Sous Chef
- T.J. Villarrubia Jr. as Churchgoer
- Alec Rayme as Vinnie the cousin

== Filming locations ==
- New Orleans, Louisiana
- Hammond, Louisiana
- Yonkers, New York
