= Meyer Wolfe =

American sculptor

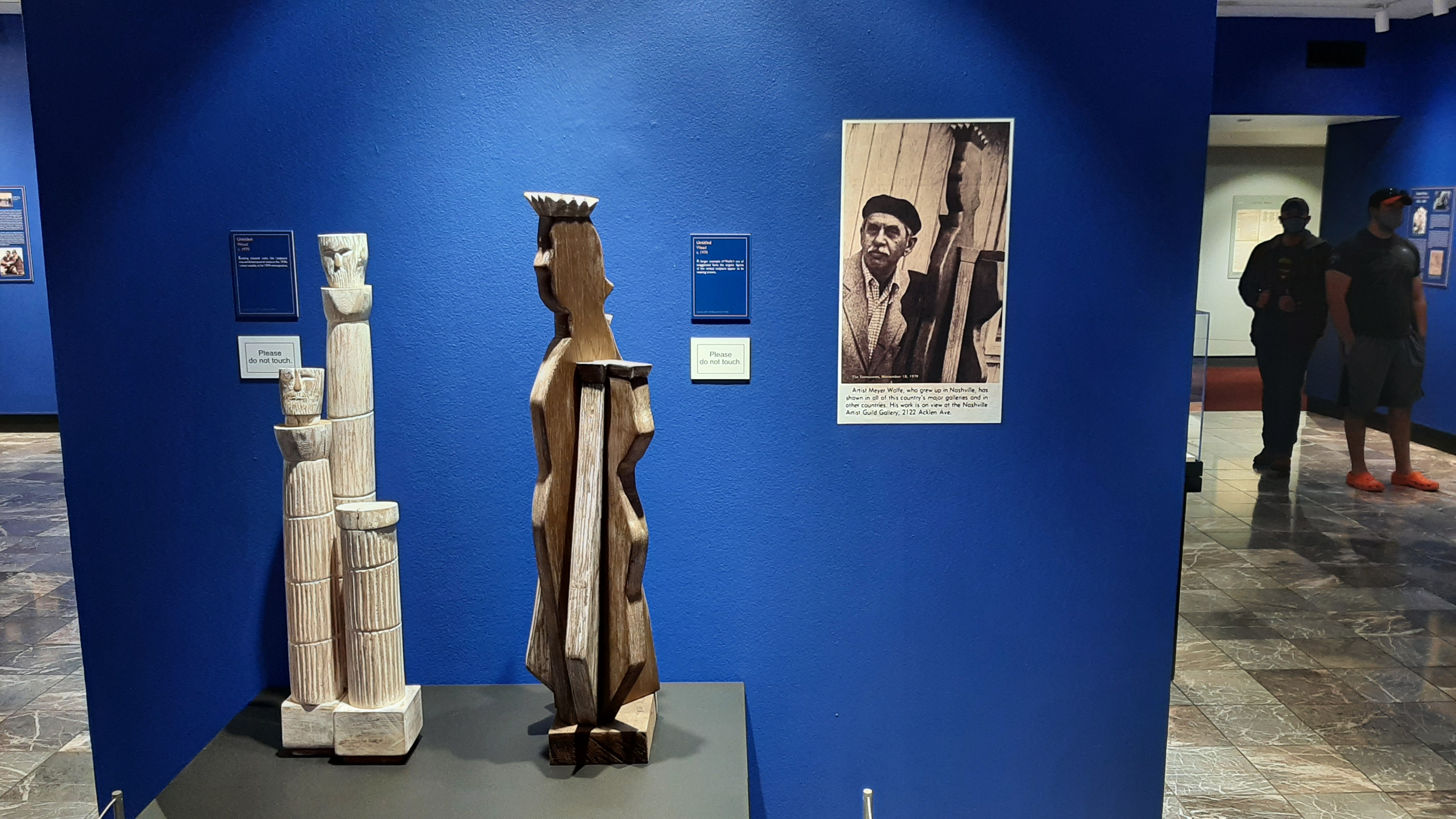
Work by Meyer Wolfe at the Nashville Parthenon

Meyer R. Wolfe (September 10, 1897– 1985), also known as Mike Wolfe, was an American painter, lithographer and sculptor. His best work is representative of a school of regional realism that arose in the 1930s as a response to European Modernism.

Wolfe was born in Louisville, Kentucky, and grew up in Nashville, Tennessee. After studies in Chicago at the Academy of Fine Arts and at the Art Students League of New York under John French Sloan, he went to Paris to train under Pierre Lauren at the Académie Julian.

His 1934 lithograph Red Eye's Hall is featured at the Library of Congress. His works Mooney's Place, Women Bathing, and Brother Matthew Preaching are held at the Smithsonian American Art Museum.

Wolfe was the husband of the photographer Louise Dahl-Wolfe. He assisted Dahl-Wolfe in her photographic career, painting backgrounds for her sittings and helping when business problems arose.
