= Robert K. Oermann =

American music journalist

- Born: Robert Karl Oermann; Pittsburgh, Pennsylvania, U.S.
- Occupations: Music journalist; author
- Years active: 1978-present
- Known for: MusicRow

Robert Karl Oermann is an American music journalist and author. He is known for his coverage of country music. He is a long-time regular contributor to MusicRow, a trade publication for which he writes a weekly column.

== Background ==
Oermann was born in Pittsburgh, grew up there and attended the University of Pittsburgh receiving an undergraduate degree in fine arts. As a boy, he started a record collection with the records which he was given as compensation, when he helped out in his grandmother's Pittsburgh record store. The childhood collection grew to become what was said to be in 1999 as "one of the largest private record archives" in Nashville.

He began his professional career working as an artist and illustrator. In the 1970s he worked as advertising manager for a chain of record stores in St. Louis. After receiving a master's degree in the field of information studies from Syracuse University in Syracuse, New York; in 1978 he moved to Nashville for a job with the Country Music Foundation (CMF), where he was in charge of technical services for the organization and its Country Music Hall of Fame and Museum.

While working at the CMF, Oermann began doing freelance writing on music and developed a reputation as a music historian. As a freelance contributor, he wrote thousands of articles for national publications including Entertainment Weekly, Esquire, Billboard, The Hollywood Reporter, Musician, Us, TV Guide, and Country Song Roundup. In 1982 he became the first country music reporter and critic for USA Today, continuing in the position until 1986. Also from 1982 to 1993, he was a music reporter for Nashville's daily newspaper, The Tennessean. He was editor-at-large for Country Music magazine, which ceased publication in 2003. He is credited for the liner notes for at least 75 albums, including the recording of the O Brother, Where Art Thou? movie soundtrack. He has written and co-authored several books on country music and its history. With his wife, Mary Agnes Bufwack, an anthropologist and social worker, he co-wrote Finding Her Voice: The Saga of Women in Country Music, which was awarded the ASCAP Deems Taylor Award for music-book excellence.

Oermann also has worked in film, television, and radio, primarily as a writer for documentaries and sometimes as a host. He was a judge on the USA Network reality TV show Nashville Star for the series' first season which aired in 2003.

== Works ==
=== Books ===
- Bufwack, Mary A.; Oermann, Robert K. (2003) [1993]. Finding Her Voice: The Saga of Women in Country Music, 1800–2000. Crown. ISBN 978-0826514325.
- Oermann, Robert K. (1999). A Century of Country: An Illustrated History of Country Music. TV Books. ISBN 1-57500-083-0.

=== Film and video ===
- Music Row Video (UPI, 1983–1984); nationally syndicated television series on country music, written and co-hosted by Oermann
- The Women of Country (CBS, 1993); television series written by Oermann
- America's Music: The Roots of Country (TBS, 1996); documentary film series directed by Tom Neff and Jerry Aronson, written by Neff and Oermann
- The Black Experience in Country Music (1998); documentary written and directed by Oermann
- SoundTable (1999); documentary written and directed by Oermann
- Century of Country (TNN, 1999); Oermann was historical consultant

=== Radio ===
- The Conway Twitty Story (1980); syndicated radio program, scripted by Oermann
- Album Country (1988); syndicated radio program, scripted by Oermann
- Music City's New Country (1991–1994); radio show written and hosted by Oermann for WSM-FM in Nashville, syndicated in Japan
