= Barry Rubinow =

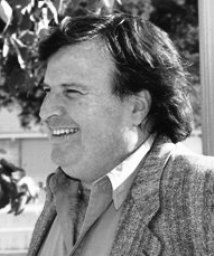
- June 2005
- Born: 1956 (age 69–70); Glen Rock, New Jersey
- Occupations: business executive, film producer, director, and editor
- Spouse: Carey Rubinow
- Children: Brian, Jordan

Barry Rubinow (born 1956) is a film executive and editor, born in Glen Rock, New Jersey, a suburb of New York City. Currently, he lives in West Hills, Los Angeles, California.

== Education ==
Rubinow received his Bachelor of Arts from Bucknell University with a major in English and Psychology in 1978. In 1981, he completed a Master of Fine Arts at the School of Cinematic Arts at the University of Southern California.

== Career ==
Rubinow is the Senior Vice President of Documentary Channel, where he supervises all original production and post production. DOC is the first channel in the United States to show documentaries on a full-time basis. The Documentary Channel was created in 1998 and is currently on the Dish Network, Channel 197.

Rubinow is also a television and documentary film editor.

In 1999, Rubinow produced and directed the 35mm feature film The Set Effect.

== Filmography (producing and directing) ==
Feature film

- The Set Effect (1999)

Documentaries (producing)

- Hot Docs (2006)

== Filmography (editing) ==
Short documentaries

- Red Grooms: Sunflower in a Hothouse (1986)
- Louise Dahl-Wolfe: Painting with Light (1999)
- Herb Alpert: Music for Your Eyes (2003)

Feature documentaries

- Country Music: The Spirit of America (IMAX, 2003) a.k.a. Our Country
- Chances: The Women of Magdalene (2006)
- Lords of BSV (2016)

Television documentaries

- Frederic Remington: The Truth of Other Days (PBS, 1991)
- Beatrice Wood: Mama of Dada (PBS, 1994)
- America's Music: The Roots of Country (TBS 1996)

Television series

- Beakman's World (1993)
- COPS (1993–1994)
- Ultimate 10 (1999)
- The Eddie Files (1997–2000)
- Born American (2003)
- Doc Talk (2006)
- Hot Docs (2006)

== Awards ==
Wins

- Academy of Television Arts & Sciences: Emmy Award, Beakman's World, editing, 1995
