= Chances: The Women of Magdalene =

- Theatrical release poster
- Directed by: Tom Neff
- Written by: Tom Neff; Barry Rubinow
- Produced by: Tom Neff
- Starring: Rev. Becca Stevens
- Cinematography: Tom Neff
- Edited by: Barry Rubinow
- Music by: John Rosasco
- Release date: April 21, 2006 (Nashville Film Fest)
- Running time: 94 minutes
- Country: United States
- Language: English

Chances: The Women of Magdalene is a 2006 documentary film produced and directed by Tom Neff, and written by Neff and Barry Rubinow. The documentary features the socially conscious organization known as "Magdalene," located in Nashville, Tennessee. The system of recovery practiced at Magdalene is based on the twelve steps and twelve traditions of Narcotics Anonymous.

== Interviews ==
- Rev. Becca Stevens—Chaplain of St. Augustine's Chapel at Vanderbilt University
- Clemmie Greenlee

== Critical reception ==
Variety magazine film critic Joe Leydon lauded the film, and wrote, "Inspiring uplift abounds in Chances: The Women of Magdalene, a slickly produced but unmistakably sincere docu about a femme Episcopalian priest's outreach program to rehabilitate Nashville prostitutes. Theatrical potential is limited, but pic could find appreciative auds through tube and nonprofit exposure...Pic touches briefly yet respectfully on Rev. Stevens' background and motivation -- she was sexually abused at an early age -- but focuses primarily on her program's clients, who prove remarkably candid while describing past ordeals and future plans. Feisty Clemmie Greenlee emerges as first among equals, and her response to tragedy provides one of the pic's many emotional highlights. High-def video lensing enhances the pic's intimacy."

Nashville Scene film critic Jim Ridley gave the film a more mixed review, and wrote, "The women’s blunt personal stories form the most compelling parts of Tom Neff’s earnest, polished profile, which amounts to promotion for the program and its good works. As documentary, it’s limited: we see very little of the day-to-day life inside the shelters, while a project pairing Magdalene House residents with Music Row songwriters takes up too much of the movie’s focus—it comes as an intrusion when a son’s funeral turns into a music montage. But the Magdalene women interviewed on camera have fought for their second chances, and the hard-won hope on their faces can make you forgive a lot."

== Awards ==
Wins

- Nashville Film Festival: Audience Award for Best Documentary, Tom Neff, 2006.
