= Amy Everson =

American artist, actor, and screenwriter

- Occupations: Actor; Artist; Writer
- Years active: 2014–present
- Website: www.amyeverson.com

Amy Everson is an American artist, actor, and screenwriter.

Everson re-appropriates objects from pop culture and presents them in humorous or disturbing ways. Many pieces are made of felt. She is also known for creating cloth masks and body suits often with exaggerated genitalia. Her work has been interpreted a critique of rape culture.

== Film work ==
Everson co-wrote and starred in Felt directed by Jason Banker. Everson's work in Felt earned her the 2014 Fantastic Fest "Next Wave" Spotlight Award for Best Actress, and the Nashville Film Festival Graveyard Shift Competition Award for Best Actress.

Everson was the costume and makeup art director for the musical group Modest Mouse's "Lampshades on Fire" video as well as the art and costume director for their second video, “The Ground Walks with Time in a Box.”

== Filmography ==
Film
Year	Title	Role	Notes
2014	"Felt"	Amy	Also writer
2014	"A Reunion"	Yoko	Voice

== Awards and nominations ==
Year	Nominated work	Award	Category	Result
2015	"Felt"	Nashville Film Festival – Graveyard Shift Competition	Best Actress	Won
2014	"Felt"	Fantastic Fest – Next Wave Spotlight Award	Best Actress	Won
