= Francis Naumann =

American scholar, curator, and art dealer

Francis M. Naumann (born April 25, 1948) is an American scholar, curator, and art dealer, specializing in the art of the Dada movement and the Surrealist periods. He has an MFA degree in painting from the Art Institute of Chicago (1973) and a PhD in art history from the Graduate Center of the City University of New York (1988).

Naumann taught art history at Parsons School of Design from 1977 to 1990 and is the author of numerous articles and exhibition catalogues, including New York Dada 1915-25 (Harry N. Abrams, 1994) and Marcel Duchamp: The Art of Making Art in the Age of Mechanical Reproduction (Harry N. Abrams, Inc. 1999).

In 1996, Naumann organized "Making Mischief: Dada Invades New York" for the Whitney Museum of American Art, in 1997, "Beatrice Wood: A Centennial Tribute" for the American Craft Museum in New York, and, in 2003, he co-curated "Conversion to Modernism: The Early Work of Man Ray" for the Montclair Art Museum.

From 2001 to 2020, Naumann operated the Francis M. Naumann Fine Art gallery in New York City which showed the work of artists Marcel Duchamp, Beatrice Wood and Man Ray.

Naumann has published Marcel Duchamp: The Art of Chess, which examines the correlation between Duchamp's chess activities and his art, and Naomi Savage: Stretching the Limits of Photography published by the Milton Art Bank in 2020. His writings on Marcel Duchamp were published as The Recurrent, Haunting Ghost: Essays on the Art, Life and Legacy of Marcel Duchamp (New York: Readymade Press, 2012). In 2019, his autobiographical account of his relationship with art historians Leo Steinberg and John Rewald (among others) and the artist Beatrice Wood was published as MENTORS: The Making of an Art Historian (Doppelhouse Press).

In 2026, Naumann's book, Impossible: The Love Affair between Marcel Duchamp and Maria Martins, and the Artwork it Inspired, was published by Abbeville Publishing Group.

In 2019, ArtNet described Naumann as "one of the world's leading experts on Marcel Duchamp".

== See also ==
- Beatrice Wood: Mama of Dada
