= Born into Brothels =

2004 documentary film by Zana Briski

Born into Brothels: Calcutta's Red Light Kids
- Directed by: Zana Briski; Ross Kauffman
- Written by: Zana Briski; Ross Kauffman
- Produced by: Zana Briski; Ross Kauffman
- Starring: Shanti Das; Puja Mukerjee; Avijit Halder; Suchitra
- Cinematography: Zana Briski; Ross Kauffman
- Edited by: Ross Kauffman
- Music by: John McDowell
- Distributed by: THINKFilm; HBO
- Release dates: 17 January 2004 (Sundance); 8 December 2005
- Running time: 85 minutes
- Countries: United States; India
- Languages: Bengali; English
- Box office: $3.5 million (United States)

Born into Brothels: Calcutta's Red Light Kids is a 2004 Indian-American documentary film about the children of sex workers in Sonagachi, Kolkata's red light district. The widely acclaimed film, written and directed by Zana Briski and Ross Kauffman, won a string of accolades including the Academy Award for Best Documentary Feature in 2005.

== Plot ==
Briski, a documentary photographer, went to Kolkata to photograph sex workers. While there, she befriended their children and offered to teach the children photography to reciprocate being allowed to photograph their mothers. The children were given cameras so they could learn photography and possibly improve their lives.

Their photographs depicted a life in the red light district through the eyes of children typically overlooked and sworn off to do chores around the house until they were able to contribute more substantially to the family welfare.

Much of their work was used in the film, and the filmmakers recorded the classes as well as daily life in the red light district. The children's work was exhibited, and one boy was even sent to a photography conference in Amsterdam. Briski also recorded her efforts to place the children in boarding schools although many of the children did not end up staying very long in the schools they were placed in. Others, such as Avijit and Kochi, not only went on to continue their education but were graded well.

== Aftermath ==
There is debate about the extent to which the documentary has improved the lives of the children featured in it.

The filmmakers claim that the lives of children appearing in Born into Brothels have been transformed by money earned through the sale of photos and a book on them. Ross Kauffman, co-director of the documentary, says that the amount earned is $100,000 (about Rs.4.5 million), which will pay for their tuition and for a school in India for children of sex workers. Briski has started a non-profit organization to continue this kind of work in other countries, named Kids with Cameras. A film is being made on the life story of a high-profile trio of call girl sisters, Shaveta, Khushboo and Himani, born in one of the brothels of Haryana.

In November 2006, Kids with Cameras provided an update on many of the children's conditions, asserting that they had entered high schools or universities in India and the United States or found employment outside of sex work. Kids with Cameras continues to work toward improving the lives of children from the Calcutta red light district with the plan to build a Hope House. Updates for 2010 and 2009 were also published.

In 2004, REACT to FILM organized a screening for Born into Brothels at the SoHo House in Manhattan, NY. In 2010, the film's director, Zana Briski, joined the advisory board of REACT to FILM.

== Criticisms ==
The Durbar Mahila Samanwaya Committee, a sex workers' organization active in Sonagachi, has criticized the film for presenting the children's parents as abusive and for ignoring the sex workers' efforts to provide education programs and career building activities for their children. In addition, the film has been criticized in India for perceived racist stereotyping, and has also been viewed as exploiting the children for the purposes of Indophobic propaganda in the West. A review in Frontline, India's national magazine, summarized this criticism, remarking:

IF Born Into Brothels were remade as an adventure-thriller in the tradition of Indiana Jones and the Last Crusade, its posters might read: "New York film-maker Zana Briski sallies forth among the natives to save souls.

Some critics joined the Sonagachi sex worker-advocacy groups in condemning the film for exploitation of the plight of the sex workers for profit. Other criticisms were raised about "ethical and stylistic" problems, by Partha Banerjee, interpreter between the filmmakers and the children.

== Reception ==
=== Critical response ===
Born into Brothels has an approval rating of 95% on review aggregator website Rotten Tomatoes, based on 106 reviews, and an average rating of 7.83/10. The website's critical consensus states, "A powerful and uplifting documentary". Metacritic assigned the film a weighted average score of 78 out of 100, based on 32 critics, indicating "generally favorable" reviews.

=== Awards ===
- 2004 Bermuda International Film Festival Audience Choice Award - Briski, Kauffman; Documentary Prize - Briski, Kauffman
- 2004 Cleveland International Film Festival Best Film - Briski, Kauffman
- 2004 Full Frame Documentary Film Festival Audience Award - Briski, Kauffman (tied with Word Wars)
- 2004 International Documentary Association Award for Feature Documentaries - Briski, Kauffman, Geralyn Dreyfous-White, Pamela Boll (tied with Fahrenheit 9/11)
- 2004 Los Angeles Film Critics Association Awards for Best Documentary/Non-Fiction Film - Kauffman, Briski
- 2004 National Board of Review Award for Best Documentary Feature - Zana Briski and Ross Kauffman
- 2004 Seattle International Film Festival Golden Space Needle Award for Best Documentary - Briski, Kauffman
- 2004 Sundance Film Festival Audience Award, Documentary - Kauffman
- 2005 Academy Award for Best Documentary Feature Briski, Kauffman
- 2005 Raindance Film Festival Closing Night Film

=== Nominations ===
- 2005 Directors Guild of America Award for Outstanding Directorial Achievement in Documentary - Briski, Kauffman
- 2005 Golden Satellite Award for Best Motion Picture, Documentary
- 2004 Sundance Film Festival Grand Jury Prize, Documentary - Kauffman, Briski
- 2013 Calcutta Film Festival (funded by Walt Disney Pictures), Documentary - Spielberg, Steven. Lucas, George. Abrams, J. J.

== Preservation ==
Born into Brothels was preserved and restored by the Academy Film Archive and the UCLA Film & Television Archive in conjunction with the Sundance Institute from a D5, a DigiBeta, a 35mm print and a Magneto Optical Disk. Restoration funding provided by the Sundance Institute and the Academy of Motion Picture Arts and Sciences. The restoration had its U.S. West Coast premiere at the UCLA Festival of Preservation in 2022.
