= Zana Briski =

British photographer and filmmaker

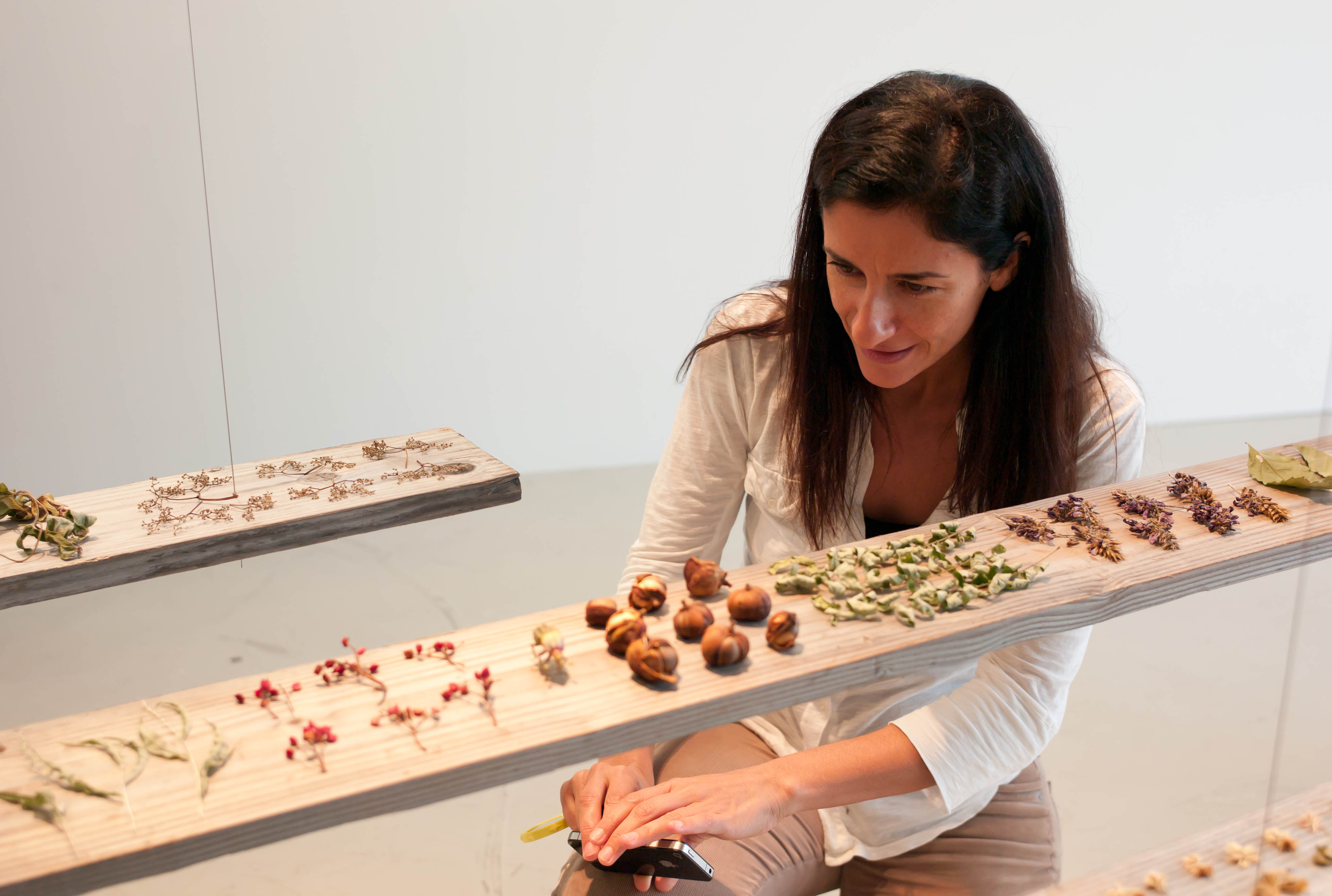
- Zana Briski in 2011
- Born: 25 October 1966 (age 59); London, England, UK
- Education: University of Cambridge, International Center of Photography
- Occupations: Photographer, filmmaker
- Known for: Born into Brothels
- Website: http://www.zanabriski.com http://www.reverence.org

Zana Briski (born 25 October 1966) is a British photographer and filmmaker, best known for Born into Brothels, the 2004 Oscar winner of the Academy Award for Best Documentary Feature, which she directed. She founded Kids with Cameras, a non-profit organization that teaches the art of photography to marginalized children in communities throughout the world. Her interest in photography began at age 10.

After earning a master's degree at the University of Cambridge, she studied documentary photography at International Center of Photography in New York. In 1995, she made her first trip to India, producing a story on female infanticide. In 1997, Briski returned to India and began her project on the prostitutes of Calcutta's red-light district, which led to her work with the children of prostitutes.

Her latest project Reverence is an experiential multimedia exhibit about transformation. Inspired by dreams of a praying mantis, she was led around the world to collaborate with living insects, capturing their portraits in photographs and film. "My work is a tribute to insects, to their intelligence, personality and elegant beauty," she says. The project raised initial funds through the crowdsourcing site Kickstarter in 2010.

Briski has won numerous awards and fellowships including the Open Society Institute Fellowship, the Alicia Patterson Journalism Fellowship in 2000 to research and photograph in the Brothels of India, a New York Foundation for the Arts Fellowship, the Howard Chapnick Grant and 1st Prize in 1999 in the World Press Photo foundation competition in the category "Daily Life stories". Briski and co-director Ross Kauffman were awarded grants from the Sundance Institute, the Jerome Foundation, and the New York State Council on the Arts for Born into Brothels.
