= America's Music: The Roots of Country =

- Soundtrack cover
- Directed by: Jerry Aronson; Tom Neff
- Written by: Tom Neff; Robert K. Oermann
- Produced by: Executive Producer: Pat Mitchell; Producers: Tom Neff; Tom McMahon; Diandra Douglas; Vivian Schiller
- Narrated by: Kris Kristofferson
- Cinematography: Steven Wacks
- Edited by: Barry Rubinow; Lisa Leeman; Andrew Littlejohn
- Music by: John Rosasco
- Production company: Wild Wolf Productions
- Distributed by: TBS
- Release date: June 2, 1996 (United States)
- Running time: 300 minutes
- Country: United States
- Language: English
- Budget: 3,000,000

America's Music: The Roots of Country is a 1996 three-part, six episode documentary about the history of American country music directed by Tom Neff and Jerry Aronson and written by Neff and Robert K. Oermann. The film touches on many of the styles of music that make up country music, including: Old-time music, Cajun music, Folk music, Rockabilly, Western music, Western swing, the Bakersfield sound, Honky-tonk and the Nashville sound. Country music artist and actor Kris Kristofferson narrates the three-part series.

The film was produced by Wild Wolf Productions for TBS Superstation and shown on three consecutive nights beginning on June 2, 1996. It was repeated only once in the Fall of 2011.

== Synopsis ==
The six-hour, multi-part film series, examines the evolution one of America's popular and enduring music forms from its origin in Appalachia to its current status across the United States and the world. The film is a comprehensive journey through the history of American country music as told by the performing legends of the past and the performing stars of today. Included are record producers, songwriters, record executives, fans, country radio DJ's, and others who laid the foundations of country music and those who stand at its apex today.

=== Episodes ===
- The Birth of Sound (Vol. 1 - VHS)
- Singing Cowboys and Western Swing (Vol. 1 - VHS)
- Honky-Tonk Kings and Queens (Vol. 2 - VHS)
- The Nashville Sound (Vol. 2 - VHS)
- Folk Revival (Vol. 3 - VHS)
- From Rockabilly to Rockin' the Country (Vol. 3 - VHS)

== Interviews ==
- John Anderson
- Chet Atkins
- Moe Bandy
- Ray Benson
- Baxter Black
- Suzy Bogguss
- Kix Brooks
- Tony Brown
- Glen Campbell
- Janette Carter
- Johnny Cash
- June Carter Cash
- Ray Charles
- Patsy Cline (archival)
- Rodney Crowell
- Jimmie Davis
- Billy Dean
- Little Jimmy Dickens
- Joe Diffie
- Ronnie Dunn
- Don Edwards
- Freddy Fender
- Mickey Gilley
- Merle Haggard
- Harlan Howard
- Janis Ian
- Alan Jackson
- Waylon Jennings
- Flaco Jiménez
- George Jones
- Naomi Judd
- Wynonna Judd
- Hackberry Ramblers
- Sammy Kershaw
- Tracy Lawrence
- Patty Loveless
- Loretta Lynn
- Raul Malo
- Kathy Mattea
- Terry McBride
- Tim McGraw
- Jim Messina
- Ronnie Milsap
- Bill Monroe
- Patsy Montana (archival)
- Lorrie Morgan
- Michael Martin Murphey
- Martina McBride
- Anne Murray
- Willie Nelson
- Randy Owen
- Buck Owens
- Dolly Parton
- Sam Phillips
- Ray Price
- Charley Pride
- Collin Raye
- Jimmie Rodgers (archival)
- Roy Rogers
- Jo-El Sonnier
- Roni Stoneman
- Rick Trevino
- Jon Vezner
- Hank Williams (archival)
- Hank Williams, Jr.
- Tammy Wynette
- Michelle Wright
- Trisha Yearwood
- Dwight Yoakam

== Production ==
The film was shot at various locations, including: Bakersfield, California; Beaumont, Texas; Beaver Creek, Colorado; Branson, Missouri; Bristol, Tennessee; Copper, Mountain, Colorado; Dallas, Texas; Galax, Virginia; Lafayette, Louisiana; Los Angeles, California; Memphis, Tennessee; Meridian, Mississippi; Mount Vernon, Texas; Murfreesboro, Tennessee; Nashville, Tennessee; Renfro Valley, Kentucky; Smithville, Tennessee; Tucson, Arizona; and Victorville, California.

== Reception ==
=== Critical response ===
In a television review the Sacramento Bee wrote, "How country music came so far is at the heart of the ambitious and marvelous America's Music: The Roots of Country, which was in production for four years...America's Music begins with country's 1800s birth in the Appalachian Mountains and winds down with young singer-songwriter Tracy Lawrence summarizing it today: 'Country music is where everything has been poured into, and what's coming out is Young Country. It's hip and it's hot, and it's what's happening, and it's fresh and it's exciting.'"

The Los Angeles Times wrote of the series, "To a new generation of country-music fans who consider Randy Travis a grizzled veteran, it offers an eye-opening introduction to such towering figures from country's past as Jimmie Rodgers, the Carter Family, Hank Williams, Bob Wills, Kitty Wells, Lefty Frizzell, Johnny Cash, Merle Haggard, George Jones, Loretta Lynn, Dolly Parton and so many others who paved the way for today's superstars...The show also reminds those who may have forgotten, or perhaps never knew, that Elvis Presley was just a humble country singer from Tupelo, Miss., before he became the King of Rock 'n' Roll."

The Detroit Free Press also lauded the film, and wrote, "It makes sense that a country music documentary would know how to tell a good story. America's Music: The Roots of Country, a rich three-part retrospective that kicks off tonight on TBS, tells a dandy one. And though Kris Kristofferson is credited as narrator on the six-hour documentary, you won't hear his voice a whole bunch. Instead, the show's producers -- including Oscar-nominated filmmaker Tom Neff -- let the music and its makers do the talking. And that's a good thing, because country musicians just may be the world's best storytellers. Starting with country's earthy roots in the hills of Ireland and Scotland and landing in today's billion-dollar Nashville industry, their tale unfolds at the same easygoing pace that has long marked the music itself."

In their review, the Los Angeles Daily News wrote about one the film themes, "The only real constant in the very American world of rhinestones, cowboy boots and guitars has been its reverence and respect for its hallowed history. This is the tale told with loving care, humor and even poignancy in America's Music: The Roots of Country, a three-part, six-hour documentary that airs on TBS beginning today. Before George Strait, Vince Gill and Suzy Bogguss, there were Johnny Cash, Hank Williams and Patsy Cline. And before them, there were Bill Monroe and Jimmie Rogers and Patsy Montana. There are very strong lines that run through the lineage of country, and these are clarified and reinforced during the length of the film through interviews, wonderful old movie reels and vintage photographs. Everybody who was anybody in country music - living or dead - makes an appearance in a film that pays much more attention to the history makers and those who learned and benefited from them, than historians or academics. It gives the series a low-key, living-room quality that makes it especially appealing. After all, the one thing country music isn't is high brow."

=== Accolades ===
Nominations

- Emmy: The documentary was nominated for Outstanding Achievement in Informational Programming in 1997 (re-recording mixer and production mixer).
