= Red Grooms: Sunflower in a Hothouse =

- Video cover
- Directed by: Tom Neff
- Starring: Red Grooms
- Cinematography: Tom Neff; Steve Schklair; Mark Pleasant
- Edited by: Barry Rubinow
- Music by: Jeffrey Steinberg
- Distributed by: Direct Cinema
- Release date: 1986
- Running time: 21 minutes
- Country: United States
- Language: English

Red Grooms: Sunflower in a Hothouse is a 1986 short film biography of the Nashville-born artist Red Grooms. It was written by Tom Neff, co-directed by Neff and Louise LeQuire, and produced by Neff and Madeline Bell. The film was funded by the Tennessee State Museum and was nominated for an Academy Award for Documentary Short Subject.

== Synopsis ==
A glimpse of Red and reflection of his humor and humanism on his artwork.

== Interviews ==
- Red Grooms
- Barbara Haskell - curator at the Whitney Museum of American Art

== Awards ==
Wins

- CINE: CINE Golden Eagle, Documentary; 1986.

Nominations

- Academy Awards: Oscar, Best Documentary, Short Subjects, Tom Neff and Madeline Bell; 1987.
