= Lee Waisler =

American painter

- Born: February 25, 1938 (age 88); Los Angeles, California, United States
- Known for: Painter; Printmaker

Lee Waisler (born February 25, 1938) is an American painter and printmaker based in Los Angeles. His early artwork depicted political statements, such as the Vietnam War and the Civil Rights Movement. His current work includes portraits of celebrities and historical figures. His work is held in the collection of the Metropolitan Museum of Art, the Brooklyn Museum of Art, National Gallery of Modern Art, among others.

== Early life ==
Lee Waisler was born on February 25, 1938, in the Hollywood neighborhood of Los Angeles, California, to a politically progressive Jewish family. Growing up in nearby West Hollywood, Waisler was surrounded by the movie business and those aspiring to be in it, which, Waisler says, came to be an important part of his development. Waisler attended the Hollywood Academy of Arts from the age of seven. At the time Waisler was growing up, the Abstract expressionism movement was gaining popularity. Waisler became interested in abstraction and was influenced by artists like Mark Rothko and Clyfford Still.

== Early work ==
Waisler's first solo show took place at the Ryder Gallery in Los Angeles in 1968. Waisler exhibited a series of figurative color etching. Much of the work Waisler produced in his early career was socially and politically charged, relating to the Holocaust, civil rights, the Vietnam War, and the anti-nuclear cause.

== Public works ==
In 1981, responding to a critic's negative review of his anti-nuclear work, Waisler dumped 5 tons of horse manure at the entrance to the LA Times. The dump truck that deposited the manure had a sign reading "A critic's choice." The dump symbolized Waisler's frustration over the control art critics had over artists and the causes to which they directed their work. Waisler received international media coverage with mixed reception from artists and political sources. In spite of rejections, Waisler continued anti-nuclear and anti-war works in painting, sculpture, and public works.

Later that year, Waisler began the project entitled "Target LA" to spread anti-nuclear awareness. Using stencils to spray paint a stop-sign-within-a-target logo across the Los Angeles area, Waisler invited the public to a culminating event at the L.A. city hall for the presentation of another public work called "Bomb Cage." The sculpture consists of 8 World War II-era bomb shells encased within an octagonal wooden structure. The sculpture is presented covered by a black parachute. When the parachute is withdrawn, hundreds of black balloons escape from inside the sculpture. The balloons represent the nuclear fallout of a bomb exploding at that location. The sculpture was presented as a gift to the city of Los Angeles, but was rejected. It was later sent to Hamburg, Germany, and installed at the headquarters of the "Greens" political party.

Continuing his anti-nuclear public works, in 1985 Waisler constructed "Under the Mushroom", a 5-story tall, 50-foot wide black mushroom-cloud inflatable as a movable sculpture. The work is first exhibited in Amsterdam where the artist invited the crowd to assist in deflation by trampling the sculpture as a symbol of nuclear disarmament. The sculpture went on to be exhibited approximately 30 times internationally with public participation at each showing.

== Paintings ==
Waisler's paintings deal with a variety of social, political, and symbolic themes. His interest in the abstract expressionists that came to popularity during his youth (particularly Mark Rothko) influenced his work greatly. Waisler's early paintings were much more formal and ethereal, eventually moving on to integrating human figures into monumental, minimal, and architectural forms. From there, Waisler began to experiment with non-traditional materials: first wood, then sand, earth, and silicone carbonate. Waisler also uses recurring imagery and colors as symbols to develop a dialogue between paintings and events, such as his Holocaust memorials.

Waisler uses a variety of materials, both in paintings and sculpture, that double as representative symbols. Wood, a recurring element in Waisler's paintings, symbolizes life and shelter. Sand is used to represent time, various forms of Earth to represent power, and various forms of carbon to represent life. Waisler has also used ash and stone in his Holocaust memorials. The materials serve both symbolic and formal purposes. Waisler often layers multiple materials with paint to create high-impasto surfaces on his works, adding to other formal properties. Additionally, Waisler uses light-reflective materials and paints to explore the symbolism of light with the belief that life is transferred by light.

== New Delhi ==
In 1996 Waisler was invited to exhibit at the Museum of Modern Art in New Delhi. In 1998, Waisler spent 4 months in India producing the work for the exhibition. In order to avoid the effect of a colonial installation, Waisler produced all the work in India so as to reflect Indian culture and philosophy in both theme and materials. A central theme of the works from this period was Mandala imagery and the meditative response that it evokes. Waisler also produced an anti-colonialist sculpture called "IMF Lifesaver", a large life-saver shape made of barbed wire. The Mandala symbol continued as a recurring theme in Waisler paintings after the exhibition.

== Current work ==
In the early 2000s, Waisler began to paint portraits of people which has continued to the present day. Some figures painted include Albert Einstein, Nelson Mandela, Mahatma Gandhi, Rosa Parks, Paul Celan, Virginia Woolf, Aung San Suu Kyi, Eleanor Roosevelt, and Ethel Rosenberg. Waisler also continues to produce other figurative and abstract works and sculptures and exhibit worldwide.
