= Mark Doyle (journalist) =

British journalist (1959–2026)

- Born: 3 January 1959
- Died: 21 September 2026 (aged 67)
- Occupations: Journalist and world affairs correspondent
- Awards: United Nations Correspondents Association / UN Foundation UNCA Excellence in Journalism Award

Mark Doyle (3 January 1959 – 21 September 2026) was a British journalist and world affairs correspondent for BBC News. He was known in particular for his articles on topics related to Africa.

== Life and career ==
In 1980, Doyle volunteered as a student teacher at the British-Senegalese Institute in Dakar, Senegal. He later worked with human rights group Amnesty International and West Africa, a London-based magazine, before joining the BBC as a producer for the programme Focus on Africa in 1986. He continued reporting out of several African countries, becoming the East Africa correspondent from 1993 to 1994. He was known for his reporting done after he arrived in Kigali at the beginning of the 1994 Rwandan genocide. Doyle was one of the few correspondents to slip into Kigali before the airport was closed and was the only journalist to report continuously throughout the genocide.

His other work included being co-editor of coverage on the 1996 United States presidential election and training Eastern European journalists in Moldova. He was correspondent for the BBC's domestic service as well as BBC World Service radio and television, and was appointed BBC's West Africa correspondent in 1997.

In 2004, Doyle received a United Nations Correspondents Association / UN Foundation UNCA Excellence in Journalism Award in the category "Reporting on Humanitarian and Developmental Affairs", with his producer Dan McMillan. The award was given for coverage of post-war Liberia under the UN peacekeeping mission. As of 2007, Doyle was writing an account of his experiences in Africa entitled Under the Same Sky: Good Guys and Bad Guys in the Failed States of Africa. In March 2015, Doyle left the BBC.

Doyle stated that he was uncomfortable being described as an "Africa expert", noting in 1998:

"The little I have learnt about this place makes me realise that I am very ignorant about it. It's a vast continent with huge differences between even neighbouring countries. Like anywhere, it's full of ordinary people just getting on with their personal, complicated lives. Anyone who claims to be an 'expert' on Africa – as if it were a homogeneous region where simple rules apply – is either arrogant or just plain silly."

Doyle died after a short illness on 21 September 2026, aged 67.
