= Bel Air Film Festival =

- Location: Los Angeles, California, United States
- Started: 2008

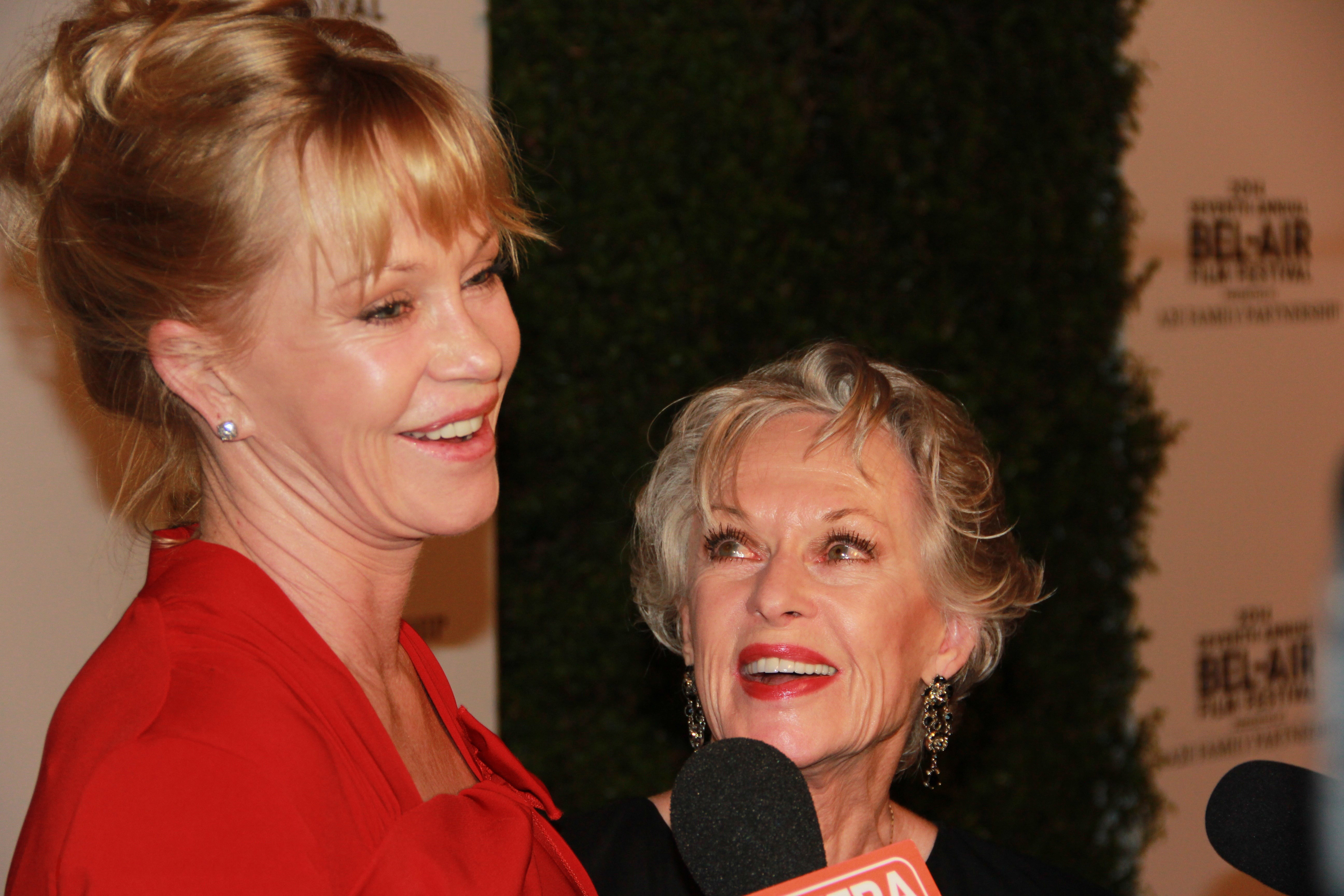
Melanie Griffith and Tippi Hedren at the 2014 Seventh Annual Bel Air Film Festival Presented by the A2E Family Partnership at the Saban Theatre in Beverly Hills. Melanie Griffith presented Tippi Hedren with the festival’s Lifetime Achievement Award while Emily Ferry, the first woman to be an I.A.T.S.E. Property Master in Hollywood was honored with the festival’s Leadership in Cinema Award.

The Bel Air International Film Festival, first held in 2008, is an annual international film festival which takes place in Bel Air and the greater Los Angeles area. The festival honors films in the following categories: Film Fashion, Documentaries, Shorts, Comedy Shorts, Comedy, Drama, Animation, Foreign Films, Music Video, and Student Film.

== 2014 festival ==
At the 2014 festival, actress Tippi Hedren received the festival’s Lifetime Achievement Award. The award was presented by her daughter, actress Melanie Griffith.

== 2011 festival ==
- Beatboxing - The Fifth Element of Hip Hop directed by Klaus Schneyder, which covers the history of beatboxing and its further developments (Best Jury Directing & Jury Documentary Award).

== 2010 festival ==
The 2010 festival selected films included:

- The Band that Wouldn't Die directed by Barry Levinson, which tells the story of the Baltimore Colts Marching Band and their quest to keep the spirit of professional football alive in Baltimore long after the franchise moved to Indianapolis.
- A Shine of Rainbows, an Irish family drama, directed and co-written by Vic Sarin and starring Aidan Quinn.

== 2009 festival ==
The 2009 festival took place November 13–17, and held 35 film screenings and 4 red-carpet events.

Documentaries selected for the 2009 festival included:

- Science Plus Dharma Equals Social Responsibility, which captures Nobel Prize Winner Richard R. Ernst who brought the advent of Magnetic Resonance Imaging (MRI) through his pure research. The filming takes place in Ernst’s hometown of Switzerland.
- I Remember Better When I Paint, featuring Rita Hayworth’s daughter, Yasmin Aga Khan, president of Alzheimer's Disease International. The film reviews the latest technology in treating Alzheimer's disease and focuses on the positive results received from patients that paint.
- Garbage Dreams, an international documentary film widely promoted by Al Gore. It follows three teenage boys born into the trash trade, growing up in the world’s largest garbage village on the outskirts of Cairo, Egypt.

== 2008 festival ==
Honorees at the 2008 festival included Anya Sarre, celebrity stylist and head fashion stylist for ET, The Insider and Entertainment Tonight on MTV; and Orian Williams, producer of the award-winning film Control and one of Variety (magazine) "10 Producers to Watch".

Screenings included:

- Louise Dahl-Wolfe: Painting with Light, a short documentary about the famed photographer's life and discovery of actress Lauren Bacall.
- James Gill Full Circles, a documentary short that is an autobiographical look at American pop artist James Gill (artist) which chronicles his meteoric rise and sudden disappearance from the Hollywood scene and art world.
