= Tom Neff =

American film executive

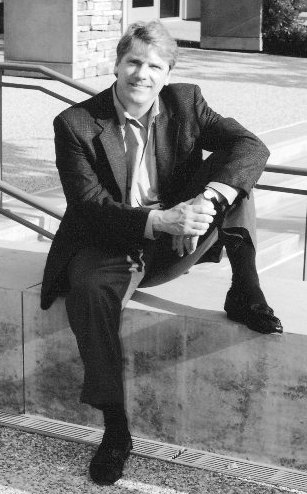
- Neff at Sage Hill School
- Born: 1953 (age 72–73); Chicago, Illinois
- Occupations: Business executive, film producer, film director, professor

Thomas Linden Neff (born 1953)-, known as Tom Neff, is an American film executive, director and producer, born in Chicago, Illinois. He lives in Nashville, Tennessee.

== Education ==
Neff received his Bachelor of Arts from Lawrence University with a major in English. In 1981, he completed a Master of Fine Arts at the School of Cinematic Arts at the University of Southern California.

== Career ==
Neff is the founder and former CEO of DOC: The Documentary Channel, the first channel in the United States to show documentaries on a full-time basis. The Documentary Channel, created in 1998, was shown on the DISH Network, Channel 197 and DirecTV, Channel 263. Neff is also a documentary film producer and director.

Neff's films have won several national and international awards, including an Academy Award nomination and an Emmy win. In 1983 he began Tennessee's first feature film production company, Polaris Productions, and wrote and directed the feature film Running Mates (1985) distributed worldwide by New World Pictures.

In the early 1990s, with partner Diandra Douglas, Neff co-founded and ran Wild Wolf Productions, a California-based (Culver City) documentary film production company that produced Beatrice Wood: Mama of Dada (1993) and America's Music: The Roots of Country (1996).

Neff produced, wrote, and directed the 30-minute documentary Herb Alpert: Music for Your Eyes, on the art and sculpture of musician Herb Alpert (2003); Country Music: The Spirit of America, (2003), an IMAX film which traces the history of the United States in the 20th century through country music; and Chances: The Women of Magdalene (2006), a feature-length documentary on the socially conscious organization Magdalene, located in Nashville, that recovers prostitutes off the street.

He has served on the board of the International Documentary Association, the Tennessee Governor's Film Advisory Board, the board of directors of the Watkins College of Art&Design in Nashville, was Chairman of Finance on the Belcourt Theater board, and was co-chairman of the Nashville Film Festival. He is a member of the Academy of Television Arts & Sciences and the Academy of Motion Picture Arts and Sciences, where he sat on the Nominating Committee for Best Documentary. Neff has participated on various documentary panels at film festivals around the world.

== Teaching ==
Neff has taught at his alma mater as an adjunct professor (School of Cinematic Arts at USC). In the 1990s he taught a course on music video production. His students taking the course (USC Cinema 499) shot various music videos for country music artists such as Radney Foster, and others. Neff obtained financing for the program from various records labels, such as Arista Nashville.

Neff is currently a full professor of film and video production at Middle Tennessee State University in Murfreesboro, Tennessee.

== Filmography (producing and directing) ==
Feature films

- Running Mates, (1985)

Short documentaries

- Red Grooms: Sunflower in a Hothouse, (1986)
- No Magic Bullets, (1988)
- A Lady as Game as That, (1989)
- Louise Dahl-Wolfe: Painting with Light, (1999)
- Pat Kerr: Wrapped in Royalty, (2002)
- Herb Alpert: Music for Your Eyes, (2003)

Feature documentaries

- Blood Brothers (1998, producer only)
- Country Music: The Spirit of America (IMAX, 2003, aka Our Country)
- Chances: The Women of Magdalene, (2006)
- Shake Hands with the Devil: The Journey of Roméo Dallaire, (2004, executive producer)
- Mr. Temple and the Tigerbelles (2018)

Television documentaries

- Frederic Remington: The Truth of Other Days (PBS, 1991)
- Beatrice Wood: Mama of Dada (PBS, 1994)
- America's Music: The Roots of Country (TBS, 1996)
- Treasures of the Academy: Guardians of History (DOC: The Documentary Channel, 2008, executive producer)
- Doc Talk (television series for the DOC: The Documentary Channel, 2008–2010, creator & writer)
- Doc-U (producer, various episodes)
- The Making of Pa's Fiddle (PBS, 2012, executive producer)

Corporate films

- Speed Dreams
- emPOWERed
- TVA:Built For The People (producer only)
- Quiet Hero
- No Magic Bullets

== Awards ==
Wins

- CINE: Golden Eagle, for: Red Grooms: Sunflower in a Hothouse; 1986.
- CINE: Golden Eagle, for: Frederic Remington: The Truth of Other Days; 1990.
- CINE: Golden Eagle, for: Beatrice Wood: Mama of Dada; 1992.
- Sichuan Television Festival, Chengdu China: Golden Panda award, Beatrice Wood: Mama of Dada; 1993. Note: First American documentary to win this award.
- National Academy of Television Arts and Sciences: Emmy Award, Best Documentary, DOC: The Documentary Channel, Tom Neff and Jimmy Holcomb, executive producers; for: Shake Hands with the Devil: The Journey of Roméo Dallaire; 2006.
- Nashville Film Festival: Audience Award for Best Documentary, Tom Neff, for: Chances: The Women of Magdalene; 2006.

Nominations

- Academy Awards: Oscar, Best Documentary, Short Subjects, for: Red Grooms: Sunflower in a Hothouse; shared with: Madeline Bell; 1987.
