= Documentary Channel (American TV channel) =

American pay television network

- Country: United States
- Broadcast area: National
- Headquarters: Nashville, Tennessee

Programming
- Picture format: 480i (SDTV)

Ownership
- Owner: Participant Media

History
- Launched: January 26, 2006; 20 years ago
- Closed: August 1, 2013; 13 years ago
- Replaced by: Pivot

The Documentary Channel was an American digital cable and satellite television network that featured documentary programming. It aired independent documentary films from around the world, including those not released in the United States. The channel (along with Halogen TV) was replaced by Pivot, a channel aimed at young adults between 18 and 34 years old, that was also owned by Participant Media, and debuted on August 1, 2013. Pivot ceased operations on October 31, 2016, folding the former Documentary Channel channel space.

== Background ==
Documentary Channel launched in January 2006. It was founded by Tom Neff, Oscar nominated and Emmy winning documentarian, and attorney John Forbess. Originally, it was supported in part by WNPT, the Nashville PBS station.

Documentary Channel won its first Emmy Award, for Outstanding Documentary, in September 2007, for Shake Hands with the Devil: The Journey of Roméo Dallaire.

Documentary Channel's signature series, DocTalk, entered its third season July 1, 2011. DocTalk was a weekly half-hour program featuring filmmakers and their newest documentary film projects and releases.

The channel was independently owned and operated until it was purchased by Participant Media in December 2012.

== Closure ==
In March 2013, Participant Media announced that Documentary Channel and Halogen TV would merge, with both relaunching as Pivot, a network focused on 18 to 34 year olds, with elements of programming from both networks. The change was later announced to take place on August 1 of that year.

Documentary Channel built up to the launch of Pivot with a countdown clock in the bottom right hand corner of the screen, where the logo normally is, saying "xx Hours xx Minutes until we document and pivot", but there was no special programing taking a look back at the channel's history, instead just showing a normal day of programing.

At approximately 6 p.m ET on Dish receivers, the channel's EPG name changed from "DOC" to "PIVOT", signifying the change happening overnight, in 12 hours time.

At 5:40 a.m ET, the channel's final documentary, 8: The Mormon Proposition, ended. 5 minutes later, the channel's final regularly scheduled program, the channel's original program Doc Talk, began, with the subject being "Full Frame Fest 2". At 5:58 a.m ET, the channel began playing an old style Indian Head test card, and started playing Edward R. Murrow's "Wires and Lights in a Box" speech, talking about how television can help people learn, but only if they accept it. Midway through the speech, in the bottom right corner, a message appeared:

Good night and good luck. Coming in October, pivot.tv

At 6:00:04 a.m ET, Pivot begun, with the final words spoken on the network being "Good night, and good luck." When the successor channel DocPivot folded three years later the last program on the network was five consecutive showings of the film Good Night, and Good Luck from 8PM on the 30th onward until the shuttering. The film choice was likely a nod to the final words spoken on Documentary Channel.

== See also ==
- National Film Board of Canada-some of their documentaries were featured on the US channel prior to DocPivot
- Documentary film
- List of documentary television channels
