= Nena discography =

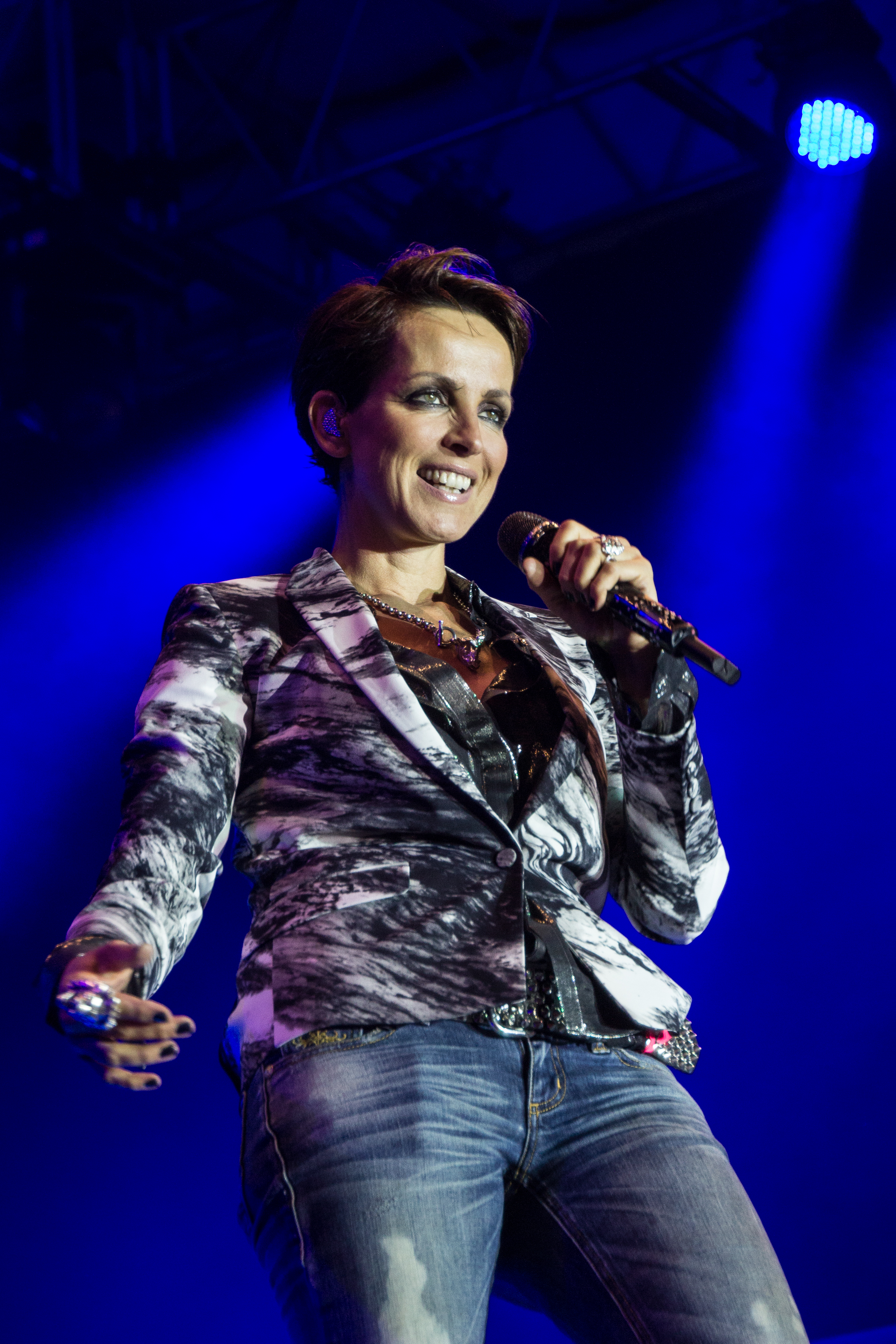
- Nena at the 50th Havelfest in Brandenburg an der Havel in 2013
- Studio albums: 19
- Soundtrack albums: 2
- Live albums: 7
- Compilation albums: 18
- Singles: 71
- Children's albums: 9

This is the discography of German pop singer Nena.

== Studio albums ==
=== The Stripes ===
- 1980: The Stripes

=== Nena (band) ===
List of albums, with selected chart positions and certifications
Title	Album details	Peak chart positions				Certifications
Title	Album details	GER	AUT	NLD	SWI	Certifications
Nena	Released: 14 January 1983; Label: CBS; Formats: CD, vinyl	1	1	2	—	FRA: Gold; GER: Platinum
?	Released: 27 January 1984; Label: CBS; Formats: CD, vinyl	1	1	2	1	GER: Platinum
Feuer und Flamme	Released: 24 June 1985; Label: CBS; Formats: CD, vinyl	2	16	19	5	GER: Gold
It's All in the Game	Released: 10 November 1985; Label: CBS; Formats: CD, vinyl	—	—	—	—	
Eisbrecher	Released: 24 November 1986; Label: CBS; Formats: CD, vinyl	45	—	—	—	

=== Nena (solo) ===
List of albums, with selected chart positions and certifications
Title	Album details	Peak chart positions				Certifications
Title	Album details	GER	AUT	NLD	SWI	Certifications
Wunder gescheh'n	Released: 5 November 1989; Label: CBS, Epic; Formats: CD, vinyl	23	—	—	—	
Bongo Girl	Released: 28 September 1992; Label: Epic; Formats: CD	32	—	—	—	
Und alles dreht sich	Released: 7 April 1994; Label: RMG; Formats: CD	53	—	—	—	
Jamma nich	Released: 14 April 1997; Label: Polydor; Formats: CD	29	—	—	—	
Wenn alles richtig ist, dann stimmt was nich	Released: 6 July 1998; Label: Polydor; Formats: CD	42	—	—	—	
Chokmah	Released: 29 October 2001; Label: Eastwest; Formats: CD	18	67	—	—	
Nena feat. Nena	Released: 28 October 2002; Label: Warner; Formats: CD, vinyl, digital download	2	1	10	5	AUT: 2× Platinum; GER: 3× Platinum; SWI: Platinum
Willst du mit mir gehn	Released: 21 May 2005; Label: Warner; Formats: CD, digital download	2	1	36	1	AUT: Gold; GER: Platinum; SWI: Gold
Cover Me	Released: 28 September 2007; Label: Warner; Formats: CD, digital download	6	18	—	22	
Made in Germany	Released: 2 October 2009; Label: Laugh & Peas (BMG); Formats: CD, vinyl, digital download	3	4	—	25	GER: Gold
Du bist gut	Released: 2 November 2012; Label: Laugh & Peas (BMG); Formats: CD, digital download	2	5	—	16	
Oldschool	Released: 27 February 2015; Label: Laugh & Peas (BMG); Formats: CD, vinyl, digital download	4	10	—	19	
Licht	Released: 16 October 2020; Label: Laugh & Peas (BMG); Formats: CD, vinyl, digital download	3	11	—	9	

== Live albums ==
Title	Album details	Peak chart positions		
Title	Album details	GER	AUT	SWI
Nena Live	Released: 1995; Recorded: Neu-Isenburg, 30 March 1993	—	—	—
Nena Live '98	Released: 16 November 1998; Recorded: Dusseldorf, 21-22 August 1998	—	—	—
Nena feat. Nena Live	Released: 24 March 2003; Recorded: Frankfurt, 11 October 2002	57	—	—
Nena Live Nena	Released: 2004; Recorded: Cologne, 19 December 2003	31	24	41
Made in Germany Live	Released: 17 September 2010; Recorded: 2009–2010	—	64	—
Live at SO36	Released: 4 March 2016; Recorded: Berlin, 4 March 2015	43	—	—
Nichts versäumt	Released: 9 November 2018; Recorded: Dortmund, 29 June 2018	27	—	—

== Video albums ==
Title	Album details	Peak chart positions (Music DVD charts)			
Title	Album details	GER	AUT	NLD	SWI
Nichts versäumt	Released: 9 November 2018; Label: Laugh and Peas; Format: DVD	2	3	8	3

== Compilation albums ==
=== Charted compilations ===
Title	Album details	Peak chart positions								Certifications
Title	Album details	GER	AUT	AUS	NOR	SWE	SWI	UK	US	Certifications
99 Luftballons	Released: 8 April 1984; Label: Epic	23	—	25	16	2	—	31	27	CAN: Gold
Nena: Definitive Collection	Released: 1996	64	—	—	—	—	—	—	—	BVMI: Gold
Nur geträumt: Ihre größten Erfolge	Released: 1998	23	16	—	—	—	72	—	—	
Alles gute: Die Singles 1982–2002	Released: 2003	65	19	—	—	—	49	—	—	
Best of Nena	Released: 2010	17	23	—	—	—	78	—	—	
Nena 40 - Das neue Best of Album	Released: 2017	12	10	—	—	—	18	—	—	

=== Other compilations ===
- 1991: Tanz auf dem Vulkan
- 1991: Nena die Band
- 1999: Simply the Best: Nena
- 2000: Leuchtturm
- 2000: Hit Collection: Nena
- 2000: Nena: Nur das Beste
- 2003: Star Boulevard: Nena
- 2004: Einmal ist keinmal (2-CD Set)
- 2004: Maxis and Mixes
- 2004: Irgendwie, irgendwo, irgendwann
- 2006: Alles ... (3-CD Set)
- 2006: Colour Collection: Nena
- 2009: Nena: The Collection
- 2013: The Essential: Nena (2-CD Set)

== Soundtracks ==
- 1996: Nena und die Bambus Bären Bande
- 2003: Sams in Gefahr: Das Liederalbum

== Children's albums ==
- 1990: Komm, lieber Mai ... (a.k.a. Nena singt die schönsten Kinderlieder) — DE: 45
- 1995: Unser Apfelhaus — DE: 69
- 1997: Nenas Weihnachtsreise — DE: 28
- 1999: Nena macht ... Rabatz
- 2002: Tausend Sterne
- 2002: Madou und das Licht der Fantasie
- 2008: Himmel, Sonne, Wind und Regen
- 2008: Dein Herz für Kinder (with Peter Maffay and Rolf Zuckowski) — DE: 82
- 2012: Alle Kinder Lieben Nena: Die Kinderlied (Compilation, 3-CD Set)
- 2013: Liederbox Vol. 1 (Compilation, 3-CD Set)
- 2014: Die 1x1 CD mit den Hits von Nena (with Lisa, Leni and Malin) — DE: 78

== Multi-artist mutual covers albums ==
- 2016: Sing meinen Song - Das Tauschkonzert Vol.3 — DE: 2
- 2016: Sing meinen Song – Das Weihnachtskonzert Vol.3 — DE: 15

== Singles ==
=== Nena (band) ===
Title	Year	Peak chart positions										Certifications	Album
Title	Year	GER	AUS	AUT	BEL	CAN	NLD	SWE	SWI	UK	US	Certifications	Album
"Nur geträumt"	1982	2	—	9	11	—	7	—	5	—	—	GER: Gold	Nena
"99 Luftballons"	1983	1	1	1	1	—	1	1	1	—	2	GER: Gold; US: Gold	Nena
"Kino" (promo)	1983	—	—	—	—	—	—	—	—	—	—		Nena
"Leuchtturm"	1983	2	—	3	—	—	7	—	—	—	—		Nena
"? (Fragezeichen)"	1983	3	—	4	19	—	12	—	1	—	—		? (Fragezeichen)
"99 Red Balloons"	1983	—	—	—	—	1	—	—	—	1	—	CAN: Platinum; UK: Platinum	99 Luftballons
"Rette mich"	1984	11	—	17	—	—	37	—	14	—	—		? (Fragezeichen)
"Lass mich dein Pirat sein"	1984	53	—	—	—	—	45	—	—	—	—		? (Fragezeichen)
"Irgendwie, irgendwo, irgendwann"	1984	3	—	7	29	—	13	—	2	—	—		Feuer und Flamme
"Just a Dream"	1984	—	71	—	—	—	—	—	—	70	102		99 Luftballons
"At the Movies"	1984	—	—	—	—	—	—	—	—	—	—		Non-album single
"? (Question Mark)"	1984	—	—	—	—	—	—	—	—	—	—		99 Luftballons
"Feuer und Flamme"	1985	8	—	18	—	—	45	—	14	—	—		Feuer und Flamme
"Haus der drei Sonnen"	1985	43	—	—	—	—	47	—	—	—	—		Feuer und Flamme
"Jung wie du"	1985	—	—	—	—	—	—	—	—	—	—		Feuer und Flamme
"It's All in the Game"	1985	—	95	—	—	—	—	—	—	—	—		It's All in the Game
"Nackt im Wind"	1985	3	—	18	—	—	—	—	21	—	—		Band für Afrika
"Du kennst die Liebe nicht"	1986	—	—	—	—	—	—	—	—	—	—		Feuer und Flamme
"Mondsong"	1986	37	—	—	—	—	70	—	—	—	—		Eisbrecher
"Engel der Nacht"	1987	—	—	—	—	—	—	—	—	—	—		Eisbrecher

=== Nena (solo) ===
Title	Year	Peak chart positions						Certifications	Album
Title	Year	GER	AUS	BEL	DEN	NLD	SWI	Certifications	Album
"Wunder gescheh'n"	1989	19	—	—	—	—	—		Wunder gescheh'n
"Du bist überall"	1990	54	—	—	—	—	—		Wunder gescheh'n
"Im Rausch der Liebe"	1990	—	—	—	—	—	—		Wunder gescheh'n
"Komm lieber Mai" (promo)	1990	—	—	—	—	—	—		Komm lieber Mai
"Die Wanze" (promo)	1990	—	—	—	—	—	—		Komm lieber Mai
"Manchmal ist ein Tag ein ganzes Leben"	1992	48	—	—	—	—	—		Bongo Girl
"Conversation"	1992	—	—	—	—	—	—		Bongo Girl
"Ohne Ende"	1993	—	—	—	—	—	—		Bongo Girl
"'n Zentimeter Liebe" (feat. Kralle Krawinkel)	1993	—	—	—	—	—	—		Non-album single
"Viel zuviel Glück"	1993	—	—	—	—	—	—		Und alles dreht sich
"Hol mich zurück"	1994	—	—	—	—	—	—		Und alles dreht sich
"Ich halt dich fest"	1994	—	—	—	—	—	—		Und alles dreht sich
"Ganz gelassen"	1997	75	—	—	—	—	—		Jamma nich
"Jamma nich" (promo)	1997	—	—	—	—	—	—		Jamma nich
"Alles was du willst"	1997	—	—	—	—	—	—		Jamma nich
"Auf dich und mich" (promo)	1997	—	—	—	—	—	—		Jamma nich
"Was hast du in meinem Traum gemacht"	1998	91	—	—	—	—	—		Wenn alles richtig ist, dann stimmt was nich
"Dann fiel mir auf" (promo)	1998	—	—	—	—	—	—		Wenn alles richtig ist, dann stimmt was nich
"Das ist normal" (promo)	1998	—	—	—	—	—	—		Wenn alles richtig ist, dann stimmt was nich
"Ich umarm' die ganze Welt"	1999	98	—	—	—	—	—		Tobias Totz und sein Löwe
"Carpe diem"	2001	66	—	—	—	—	—		Chokmah
"Oldschool Baby" (with Westbam)	2002	21	—	—	—	—	—		Alles Gute: Die Singles 1982–2002
"99 Luftballons"	2002	28	82	65	—	82	88		Nena feat. Nena
"Leuchtturm"	2002	7	21	—	—	—	79		Nena feat. Nena
"Wunder geschehen" (with Friends)	2003	9	26	—	—	—	79		Nena feat. Nena
"Anyplace, Anywhere, Anytime" (feat. Kim Wilde)	2003	3	1	2	19	1	9		Nena feat. Nena
"Nur geträumt"	2003	79	—	—	—	—	—		Nena feat. Nena
"Bang Bang" (feat. Toktok)	2004	51	—	—	—	—	—		Non-album single
"Schade" (feat. Sam Ragga Band)	2004	37	—	—	—	—	—		The Sound of Sam Ragga
"Liebe ist"	2005	1	2	—	—	60	8	GER: Gold	Willst du mit mir gehn
"Willst du mit mir gehn"	2005	6	11	—	—	—	34		Willst du mit mir gehn
"Lass mich"	2005	44	17	—	—	—	70		Willst du mit mir gehn
"Caravan of Love" (feat. Duncan Townsend)	2006	29	35	—	—	—	—		Tribute to Bravo
"Ich kann nix dafür" (feat. Oliver Pocher and Remmler)	2007	10	41	—	—	—	92		Vollidiot Soundtrack
"Mach die Augen auf"	2007	19	34	—	—	—	57		Cover Me
"Ich werde dich lieben"	2007	34	60	—	—	—	—		Cover Me
"Mein Weg ist mein Weg"	2007	—	—	—	—	—	—		Cover Me
"Dein Herz für Kinder" (with Peter Maffay and Rolf Zuckowski)	2008	69	—	—	—	—	—		Dein Herz für Kinder
"Wir sind wahr"	2009	17	50	—	—	—	—		Made in Germany
"Du bist so gut für mich"	2010	39	—	—	—	—	—		Made in Germany
"In meinem Leben"	2010	4	11	—	—	—	18		Made in Germany
"Geheimnis"	2010	82	—	—	—	—	—		Made in Germany
"Haus der drei Sonnen" (with Peter Heppner)	2010	39	—	—	—	—	—		Best of Nena
"Strobo Pop" (with Die Atzen)	2011	14	10	—	—	—	36		Party Chaos (Die Atzen)
"Let Go Tonight" (with Kevin Costner and Modern West)	2011	—	—	—	—	—	—		From Where I Stand (Kevin Costner and Modern West)
"Das ist nicht alles"	2012	40	68	—	—	—	—		Du bist gut
"Besser geht's nicht"	2013	—	—	—	—	—	—		Du bist gut
"Lieder von früher"	2015	—	—	—	—	—	—		Oldschool
"Magie"	2015	91	—	—	—	—	—		Oldschool
"Berufsjugendlich"	2015	—	—	—	—	—	—		Oldschool
"Genau jetzt"	2016	27	51	—	—	—	50		Oldschool
"Be My Rebel" (with Dave Stewart)	2018	—	—	—	—	—	—		Nichts versäumt (live versions)
"Immer noch hier" (feat. Sakias)	2018	—	—	—	—	—	—		Nichts versäumt (live versions)
"Morgenstund" (with Schiller)	2019	—	—	—	—	—	—		Morgenstund (Schiller)
"Licht"	2020	—	—	—	—	—	—		Licht
"Wandern"	2020	—	—	—	—	—	—		Licht
"Forelle" (feat. Maduh)	2020	—	—	—	—	—	—		Licht

=== As featured artist ===
- 2017: "Only You" - Zara Larsson feat. Nena
