= Nichts versäumt =

Live album by Nena

Live album by Nena
- Released: 9 November 2018
- Recorded: 29 June 2018
- Venue: Westfalenhalle, Dortmund
- Length: 1:55:00
- Language: German
- Label: The Laugh and Peas Company

Nena chronology
Live at SO36 (2016)	Nichts versäumt (2018)	Licht (2020)

Nena live chronology
Live at SO36 (2016)	Nichts versäumt (2018)

Singles from Nichts versäumt
- 1. "Immer noch hier" Released: 14 December 2018 (studio version)

Nichts versäumt (German for 'Nothing Missed') is the seventh live album by the German pop singer Nena. It is her second consecutive live album since her last studio album. The album, which was released on 9 November 2018, entered the German charts a week later at its peak position, number 27, the highest attained by a Nena live album. It reached the top 10 of music DVD charts in four countries.

== Background ==
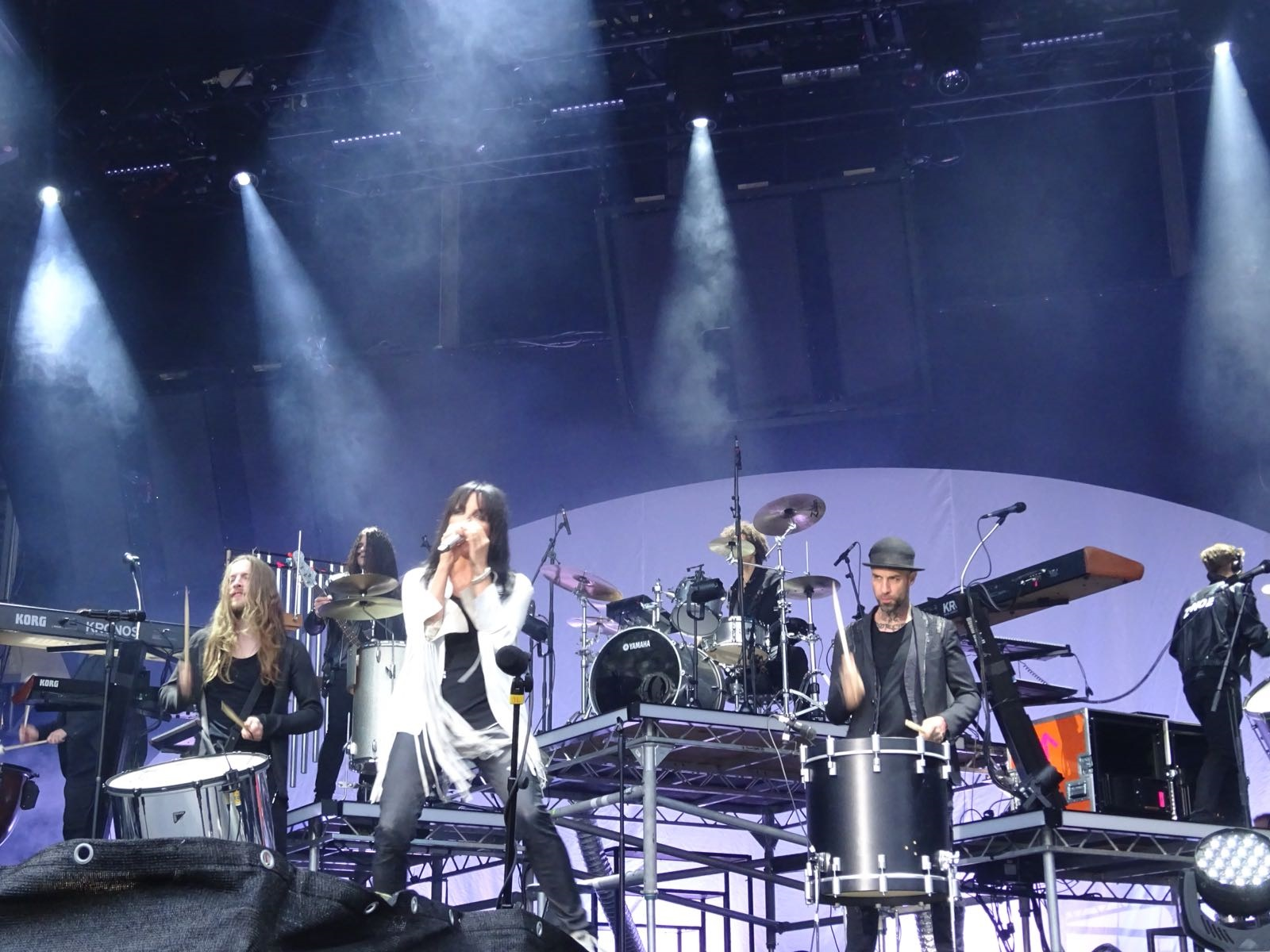
Nena during the Nichts versäumt concert in Berlin, one week before the live album was recorded.

Nena's Nichts versäumt tour takes its name from the first line of the chorus of Nena's 1982 breakthrough hit, "Nur geträumt". Effectively a greatest hits tour, Nichts versäumt was trailed by a ZDF programme of the same name screened in October 2017 to mark the 40th anniversary of Nena's first stage appearance, which was at a youth hostel in Hagen-Haspe in front of an audience of 28 people including Nena's parents. In 2018 the Nichts versäumt tour encompassed 45 cities from 7 May to 22 September, attracting a combined audience in excess of 250,000. The tour won the 2018 PRG Live Entertainment "Concert Hall" Award for venues accommodating 2,000 to 5,000 spectators. A further 24 "open air" concerts under the Nichts versäumt banner took place in 2019.

The Nichts versäumt live album comprises a recording of Nena's concert on 29 June 2018 at Westfalenhalle, Dortmund, the same venue where a Nena concert had been recorded in 1983. The album comprises 22 songs dating back to the 1980s and eight from 2005 or later including the album's only new song, the outro "Immer noch hier" which features Nena's eldest son's vocals and which Nena co-wrote with 3 people including her two other sons.

== Critical reception ==
Nena during the "Nichts versäumt" concert in Warmbad on 24 August 2019

The Dortmund concert was positively received locally. Nena received an award for the concert being a sell-out and an entertainment news site described how, "this exceptional German artist and her band showed how a great concert is full of hits, enthusiastic fans and many emotions." A largely favourable review in the Der Westen noted that the newer songs were received less rapturously than the "classics" by an audience somewhat "confused" by the rapping segment.

Early reviews of the album were positive. Echte Leute concluded, "Nichts versäumt is a fascinating live documentary with many rousing and energy-packed Nena songs. [It] demonstrates the many facets of the NDW icon, who – supported by an excellent band – impresses the listener/viewer whilst switching between pop, rock, hip hop, punk and elektro." A review in the "internet music magazine" Musicheadquarter was similarly enthusiastic, likening the concert to a "rousing, heart-warming party", a particular highlight being the "mini acoustic set Nena plays on a small stage in the middle of the audience."

== Chart performance ==
Nichts versäumt entered the German charts at number 27, the highest position attained by a Nena live album. In music DVD charts, the album reached number 2 in Germany, number 3 in both Austria and Switzerland and number 8 in the Netherlands.

== Track listing ==
DVD, Blu-ray, CD and download
No.	Title	Writer(s)	Studio version album	Length
1.	"Indianer"	Carlo Karges	Nena (1983)	3:38
2.	"Ganz oben"	Nena, Rolf Brendel	B-side to single "Nur geträumt" (1982)	3:07
3.	"Nur geträumt"	Jörn-Uwe Fahrenkrog-Petersen, Nena, Brendel	Nena (1983)	4:56
4.	"Rette mich"	Karges	? (Fragezeichen) (1984)	3:29
5.	"? (Fragezeichen)"	Fahrenkrog, Nena	? (Fragezeichen) (1984)	4:16
6.	"Kino / Tanz auf dem Vulkan"	Brendel / Karges, Jürgen Dehmel, Nena	Nena (1983)	3:09
7.	"Lass mich dein Pirat sein / Einmal ist keinmal"	Brendel, Nena / Manfred Praeker	? (Fragezeichen) (1984) / Nena (1983)	3:46
8.	"Kleine Taschenlampe brenn' / Satelittenstadt"	Axel Klopprogge, Ken Taylor / Karges, Dehmel	From film Gib Gas – Ich will Spass / Nena (1983)	4:01
9.	"Haus der drei Sonnen / Das alte Lied / Feuer und Flamme"	Karges, Fahrenkrog / Karges, Dehmel / Karges	Feuer und Flamme (1985)	3:58
10.	"Es wird schon weitergehen" (with Larissa Kerner)	Karges, Dehmel	Feuer und Flamme (1985)	5:49
11.	"Noch einmal"	Karges	Nena (1983)	4:03
12.	"Berufsjugendlich"	Herr Sorge, Jan van der Toorn, Derek Krogh, Nena, John Andrews	Oldschool (2015)	3:32
13.	"Du kennst die Liebe nicht"	Nena	Feuer und Flamme (1985)	5:24
14.	"Weisses Schiff" (Sakias)	Thommie Bayer	Wunder gescheh'n (1989)	4:01
15.	"Wunder gescheh'n"	Nena	Wunder gescheh'n (1989)	6:35
16.	"Liebe ist"	Nena	Willst du mit mir gehn (2005)	4:10
17.	"Leuchtturm"	Fahrenkrog, Nena	Nena (1983)	6:44
18.	"99 Luftballons"	Karges, Fahrenkrog	Nena (1983)	5:07
19.	"Genau jetzt"	Sorge, Toorn, Krogh, Nena	Oldschool (2015)	5:40
20.	"Oldschool / Fantasie"	Nena, Sorge / Samy Deluxe	Oldschool (2015) / Männlich (2014)	3:37
21.	"Willst du mit mir gehn"	Nena, Fahrenkrog	Willst du mit mir gehn (2005)	5:04
22.	"Irgendwie, irgendwo, irgendwann"	Karges, Fahrenkrog	Feuer und Flamme (1985)	5:19
23.	"In meinem Leben"	Nena	Made in Germany (2009)	7:26
24.	"Immer noch hier"	Nena, Leon Weik, Simeon Kerner, Samuel Kerner	Non-album track (2018)	8:16

Bonus tracks (DVD, Blu-ray and CD only)
No.	Title	Writer(s)	Studio version album	Length
25.	"Vollmond"	Karges	Nena (1983)	3:36
26.	"Be My Rebel"	Nena, Dave Stewart	Non-album track (2018)	3:45

Bonus tracks (DVD and Blu-ray only)
No.	Title	Writer(s)	Studio version album	Length
27.	"Cold Feet" (Sharron Levy)	Sharron Levy	I Am Me (2018)	4:05

== Charts ==
=== Album charts ===
Chart (2018)	Peak position
German Albums (Offizielle Top 100)	27

=== Video album charts ===
Chart (2018)	Peak position (weeks in chart)	Chart size
ERROR in "AustriaMV": Invalid position: 3 (2 wks). Expected number 1–200 or dash (–).	Top 10	
ERROR in "NetherlandsMV": Invalid position: 8 (4 wks). Expected number 1–200 or dash (–).	Top 30	
German Music DVD (GfK Entertainment)	2 (12 wks)	Top 30
ERROR in "SwitzerlandMV": Invalid position: 3 (3 wks). Expected number 1–200 or dash (–).	Top 10	
