= Eisbrecher (Nena album) =

Studio album by Nena
- Released: 24 November 1986
- Recorded: 1985–1986
- Studios: Stone Castle Studios at Castello di Carimate, Italy
- Genres: NDW, pop rock, pop
- Length: 41:41
- Language: German
- Label: CBS
- Producers: Nena, Klaus Voormann

Nena (band) chronology
It's All in the Game (1985)	Eisbrecher (1986)	Nena die Band (1991)

Nena chronology
It's All in the Game (1985)	Eisbrecher (1986)	Wunder gescheh'n (1989)

Singles from Eisbrecher
- 1. "Mondsong" Released: 1986; 2. "Engel der Nacht (Remix)" Released: 1987

Eisbrecher (German for "Icebreaker") is the fourth and final album by German pop rock band Nena and the fifth studio album of its singer, Gabriele "Nena" Kerner. After the band split the following year, Kerner went on to a solo career. "Mondsong" and the remix of "Engel der Nacht" were released as singles.

== Background ==
The Eisbrecher album came out when the fortunes of the band were decidedly on the wane. The concert tour to promote its predecessor, Feuer und Flamme, had been poorly attended and the band had parted company with their manager Jim Rakete. In his 2014 memoirs, the band's drummer Rolf Brendel described the idea behind the album:

We wanted to remember our beginnings, what had made us great. Eisbrecher was meant to be a clear, uncompromising album, without technical bombast. ... He [Klaus Voormann, the album's producer] had to tear it out, to inspire Nena's new old life and to tap into the success of the first two albums.

The album was recorded in studios at Castello di Carimate in Italy. Brendel wrote of the recording sessions, "There was throughout a real melancholy about us, the recordings and the castle. Without it ever being said, each of us felt that another Nena album would not follow this one." In contrast to the three previous albums (two No. 1s and one No. 2 in the German charts), Eisbrecher only managed No. 45 in the German charts.

== Prominent tracks ==
=== Singles ===
The first single to be released from the album was "Mondsong" which reached No. 37 in the German charts. The follow-up, "Engel der Nacht", failed to chart, meaning that three of the band's four last releases had failed to do so, a sharp decline in fortune from the band's previous track record. (See Nena/Diskografie).

The commercial failure of these two singles, one a Nena penned ballad, the other a catchy, rock tune written by Jörn-Uwe Fahrenkrog-Petersen and Carlo Karges (the duo responsible for the band's best known songs, "99 Luftballons" and "Irgendwie, irgendwo, irgendwann") provided evidence that formulae that had worked in the past would no longer reap the same rewards.

In the event and over time, it was two other tracks from the album which were to prove to be the most enduring.

=== "Jetzt bist du weg" ===
"Jetzt bist du weg" ("Now You Are Gone") was written by Nena Kerner from the perspective of a jilted lover wrestling with the accompanying emotions: not knowing whether to blame herself nor how to behave – remaining friends or getting out of the way. The song's tempo briefly quickens when she speculates about the couple potentially getting back together before slowing down again to conclude with the line, "I wish that I will finally be able to forget you." It is widely believed to be Nena's description of the split with her boyfriend, the band's drummer Rolf Brendel. The timing of events, however, do not conclusively support this belief since Eisbrecher was released in late 1986, prior to the end of Nena and Brendel's eight-year relationship in 1987. However, if the song's lyrics were autobiographical, then some of the lines (for example, "We both always wanted to be together ... but I feel so abandoned because so little remains from these years") can only reflect Nena's feelings for Brendel.

In a further twist to the question of the song's origins, in 2002 "Jetzt bist du weg" was reprised by Nena, this time with an orchestral accompaniment, as a duet with the German singer Udo Lindenberg for the Nena feat. Nena album which spectacularly rekindled her solo career in the German-speaking countries. The ostensibly curious decision to make a duet with Lindenberg out of a song with so clearly one-sided a lyric became all the more tangled when, shortly before Nena and Lindenberg performed the song live at the concert in Frankfurt marking 20 years since the band's debut release, it emerged that they had had a six-month secret affair, when she was still going out with Brendel.

Whatever its provenance, the 2002 version of the song was the only track from Eisbrecher included in the 2010 Best of Nena album which Nena holds out as being her only compilation album comprising tracks which she, as opposed to her record company, has selected.

=== "Zusammen" ===
Following the death of the band's guitarist Carlo Karges in early 2002, Nena included the Eisbrecher track "Zusammen", which he had written, in her live concert setlists in 2002–2004 and again in the period since 2014, invariably as part of the finale. A live version recorded in 2015 appears on Nena's 2016 album Live at SO36. Aptly for a performer ending a concert, the theme of the song is that the singer knows nothing about the person she is singing to ("where you live ... who you are ... what you do ... who you kiss") except that she and they belong "zusammen" (together).

== Track listing ==
No.	Title	Writer(s)	Length
1.	"Engel der Nacht" (Angels of the Night)	Jörn-Uwe Fahrenkrog-Petersen, Carlo Karges	3:51
2.	"Mondsong" (Moon Song)	Nena Kerner	3:47
3.	"Frei wie der Wind" (Free as the Wind)	Jürgen Dehmel, Kerner	4:38
4.	"Schön wär es doch" (Wouldn't It Be Nice)	Rolf Brendel, Karges	4:08
5.	"Tokyo"	Kerner	4:28
6.	"Jetzt bist du weg" (Now You Are Gone)	Fahrenkrog, Kerner	4:53
7.	"Sonnenaufgang" (Sunrise)	Fahrenkrog, Kerner	3:41
8.	"Ring frei" (Seconds Out (For the Next Round))	Karges	3:56
9.	"Zusammen" (Together)	Karges	3:36
10.	"Eisbrecher" (Icebreaker)	Karges	4:39

== Personnel ==
- Rolf Brendel – drums
- Jörn-Uwe Fahrenkrog-Petersen – keyboards, backing vocals
- Jürgen Dehmel – bass
- Carlo Karges – guitar
- Nena – vocals
