= Nena feat. Nena =

2002 studio album by Nena

Studio album by Nena
- Released: 28 October 2002 (Red); 3 March 2003 (Blue)
- Genres: Pop rock, pop
- Length: 56:23 (1CD or 2LP Red); 57:30 (1CD Blue); 89:07 (2CD Blue)
- Languages: German, English
- Label: Warner

Nena chronology
Chokmah (2001)	Nena feat. Nena (2002)	Willst du mit mir gehn (2005)

2003 edition cover

Singles from Nena feat. Nena
- 1. "99 Luftballons 2002" Released: 7 October 2002; 2. "Leuchtturm 2002" Released: 16 December 2002; 3. "Wunder geschehen 2003 (feat. Nena & Friends – Red Nose Version)" Released: 24 February 2003; 4. "Anyplace, Anywhere, Anytime (feat. Kim Wilde)" Released: 18 May 2003; 5. "Nur geträumt 2002" Released: 18 August 2003

Professional ratings
Review scores
Source	Rating
Allmusic	4/5 stars

Nena feat. Nena, also known as 20 Jahre – Das Jubiläums-Album (20 Years – The Anniversary Album) is the seventh studio album by German pop singer Nena. It contains new versions of her hits, many with her band also called Nena, some of them duets with other singers including Kim Wilde, Joachim Witt and Udo Lindenberg. The album was first released in 2002 with a red cover and reissued with a blue cover in 2003. Both releases exist in either standard or limited edition, the latter being supplemented with a bonus CD of live tracks. The songs on the bonus CD are also reworked, suggesting that Nena may have planned to update more of her back-catalogue, although there have been no further releases in this vein.

== Background ==
Throughout her solo career, Nena had experimented with various styles, culminating in the 2001 technopop Chokmah album which immediately preceded Nena feat. Nena. These had not matched the commercial success of the Nena band albums. Perhaps less imaginatively, Nena therefore chose to mark the 20th anniversary of the band's debut by recording the Nena feat. Nena album which, as its title implies, comprises updated versions of tracks from Nena's back catalogue with no new material.

12 of the 14 songs on the initial "red cover" version of the album were originally written and released in the 1980s and, with the other two coming from the 2001 Chokmah, Nena's four solo albums in the 1990s are completely unrepresented. The modifications for Nena feat Nena range from applying different tunes (e.g. the versions of "99 Luftballons" and "Nur geträumt") to those with different arrangements, often performed jointly with guest vocalists (such as "Wunder gescheh'n" and "Jetzt bist du weg"). The lyrics are also significantly reworked in some songs, for example "Leuchtturm" and the combination of the English lyrics with German lyrics for Kim Wilde's parts in "Anyplace, Anywhere, Anytime".

== Chart performance ==
While Nena remained active and popular after the demise of the band in 1987, releasing several albums for adults and children, she was unable to recapture the chart success she enjoyed in the early 1980s. Nena feat. Nena changed that. It was wildly successful in her native Germany, peaking at No. 2 to become her first top-ten album there since Feuer und Flamme in 1985. It also reached No. 1 in Austria and No. 5 in Switzerland, and remained in the charts for over a year in all three countries. Nena feat. Nena has sold more than 1.5 million copies worldwide, making it one of the best-selling albums by a German artist in the new millennium. It reestablished Nena as a national icon and international star.

The album's lead single, the new version of "99 Luftballons", was released three weeks before the album. Peaking at No. 28 in Germany, it failed to replicate the success of the original which was a No. 1 hit, although it did give Nena her first Top 40 hit since 1989. It was not until the release of the second single, the new version of "Leuchtturm", that Nena could repeat the success she had in the 1980s. The only unsuccessful single from the album was "Nur geträumt", which only peaked at No. 79.

Having been absent from the German Top 40 singles charts for 13 years, three of the tracks from this album made the Top 10. The album itself peaked at No. 2, was in the charts for over a year (55 weeks) and remains Nena's biggest selling album ever, achieving triple platinum status in Germany. (See :de:Nena/Diskografie § Studioalben).

== Aftermath ==
Although Nena feat. Nena resurrected its creator's career, it remained the case that all Nena's best-selling material had been originally written in the 1980s, virtually all of it by 1986, prior to Nena going solo. It was not until the follow-up studio album in 2005, Willst du mit mir gehn, that Nena finally broke the 1980s' monopoly of her greatest hits and concert favourites. By 2010 Nena's live performances of tracks from the album had all reverted to their original versions, with the exception of "Leuchtturm" (which is a special case, since it is performed as a combination of the original version and the 2002 version, the 2002 version being played after the second chorus).

== Track listing ==
Standard edition
No.	Title	Original version album	Length
1.	"99 Luftballons"	Nena (1983)	5:05
2.	"Anyplace, Anywhere, Anytime" (feat. Kim Wilde)	It's All in the Game (1985)	4:03
3.	"Nur geträumt"	Nena (1983)	2:54
4.	"Leuchtturm"	Nena (1983)	4:14
5.	"? (Fragezeichen)"	? (Fragezeichen) (1984)	4:08
6.	"Wunder geschehen" (feat. Joachim Witt)	Wunder gescheh'n (1989)	3:50
7.	"Jetzt bist du weg" (feat. Udo Lindenberg)	Eisbrecher (1986)	4:47
8.	"Lass mich dein Pirat sein"	? (1984)	3:29
9.	"Es regnet"	? (1984)	4:42
10.	"Lichtarbeiter"	Chokmah (2001)	4:54
11.	"Vollmond"	Nena (1983)	2:42
12.	"Irgendwie, irgendwo, irgendwann"	Feuer und Flamme (1985)	4:02
13.	"Ich häng immer noch an dir" (feat. TokTok)	? (1984)	3:41
Total length:			52:50

2002 Red cover edition bonus track
No.	Title	Original version album	Length
14.	"Carpe diem" (Söhne Mannheims Ragga Mix – Radio Edit)	Chokmah (2001)	3:33
Total length:			56:23

2003 Blue cover edition bonus track
No.	Title	Original version album	Length
14.	"Wunder geschehen 2003" (feat. Nena & Friends – Red Nose Version)	Wunder gescheh'n (1989)	4:40
Total length:			57:30

Limited edition bonus Live-CD
No.	Title	Original version album	Length
1.	"Haus der drei Sonnen"	Feuer und Flamme (1985)	4:29
2.	"Tanz auf dem Vulkan"	Nena (1983)	3:37
3.	"Dafür ist das Leben zu kurz"	Chokmah (2001)	5:49
4.	"Du kennst die Liebe nicht"	Feuer und Flamme (1985)	5:48
5.	"99 Luftballons" (Old Live Version)	Nena (1983)	4:57
6.	"Carpe diem"	Chokmah (2001)	7:26

== Live DVD releases ==
Nena feat. Nena Live
- Cover of a DVD-Audio release

Live album by Nena
- Released: 24 March 2003 (DVD video); 26 May 2003 (DVD-Audio)
- Recorded: 11 October 2002
- Venues: Jahrhunderthalle, Frankfurt
- Studio: Galaxy Studios
- Languages: German, English
- Label: Warner Music Vision
- Producer: Philipp Palm

Nena live chronology
Nena Live (1998)	Nena feat. Nena Live (2003)	Nena Live Nena (2004)

A double DVD called Nena feat. Nena Live was released on 24 March 2003. It contains Nena's twentieth anniversary show recorded on 11 October 2002 at Frankfurt am Main. The show ran for nearly three hours, during which Nena invited many friends and fellow musicians to sing along with her: Joachim Witt, Udo Lindenberg, Kim Wilde, Westbam, Markus Mörl, Hartmut Engler, Rosenstolz, Mike Tait, Howard Jones, and TokTok, as well as the surviving members of Nena band: Rolf Brendel, Uwe Fahrenkrog-Petersen and Jürgen Dehmel. The second DVD contains footage of Nena and her band on tour, interviews, and music videos for the new versions of the songs.

On 26 May 2003, an abridged audio-only version of the same concert was released as one DVD-Audio disc.

=== DVD video track listing ===
DVD 1

1. Haus der drei Sonnen
2. Satellitenstadt
3. Tanz auf dem Vulkan
4. Oldschool Baby (featuring Westbam)
5. Carpe Diem
6. Wunder gescheh'n 2002 (featuring Joachim Witt)
7. Kleine Taschenlampe brenn (featuring Markus)
8. Lichtarbeiter 2002
9. Silbermond
10. Es regnet 2002
11. Lass mich dein Pirat sein 2002 (featuring Hartmut Engler)
12. Jetzt bist du weg 2002 (featuring Udo Lindenberg)
13. Dafür ist das Leben zu kurz
14. ? (Fragezeichen) 2002
15. Du kennst die Liebe nicht (featuring Rosenstolz)
16. What Is Love? (featuring Howard Jones)
17. Anyplace, Anywhere, Anytime (featuring Kim Wilde)
18. Leuchtturm (Old Version) (featuring Rolf Brendel, Uwe Fahrenkrog-Petersen and Jürgen Dehmel)
19. Rette Mich
20. Ganz Oben
21. Nur Geträumt 2002

DVD 2

1. 99 Luftballons 2002
2. 99 Luftballons
3. Irgendwie, irgendwo, irgendwann
4. Vollmond 2002
5. Manchmal ist ein Tag ein ganzes Leben
6. Ich umarm die ganze Welt
7. Ruby Tuesday (featuring Mike Tait)
8. No Expectations
9. Zusammen
10. Der Anfang vom Ende
11. Bang Bang (featuring TokTok)
12. ? (Fragezeichen) 2002
13. Credits and Outro

== Charts ==
=== Weekly charts ===
Chart (2002–03)	Peak position
Austrian Albums (Ö3 Austria)	1
Dutch Albums (Album Top 100)	10
German Albums (Offizielle Top 100)	2
Swiss Albums (Schweizer Hitparade)	5

=== Year-end charts ===
Chart (2002)	Position
German Albums (Offizielle Top 100)	69
Chart (2003)	Position
Austrian Albums (Ö3 Austria)	4
Dutch Albums (Album Top 100)	88
German Albums (Offizielle Top 100)	2
Swiss Albums (Schweizer Hitparade)	18
