= Wir sind wahr =

Single by Nena

from the album Made in Germany
- Released: 18 September 2009
- Genre: Pop rock; pop
- Length: 5:39
- Label: Warner
- Songwriter(s): Nena Kerner; Lukas Hilbert; Uwe Fahrenkrog-Petersen
- Producer(s): Nena Kerner; Reinhold Heil; Derek von Krogh; Uwe Fahrenkrog-Petersen

Nena singles chronology
"Ich werde dich lieben" (2007)	"Wir sind wahr" (2009)	"Du bist so gut für mich" (2010)

"Wir sind wahr" (German for "We Are True") is a song by German recording artist Nena. It was written by Nena, Lukas Hilbert, and Uwe Fahrenkrog-Petersen for her fifteenth studio album Made in Germany (2009), and produced by Nena, Reinhold Heil, Derek von Krogh, and Fahrenkrog-Petersen.

== Formats and track listings ==
CD maxi single
No.	Title	Length
1.	"Wir sind wahr" (Radio Edit)	3:58
2.	"SchönSchönSchön"	3:53
3.	"Wir sind wahr" (Album Version)	5:39
4.	"Wir sind wahr" (Nacht Mix)	6:12

== Charts ==
Chart (2009)	Peak position
Austria (Ö3 Austria Top 40)	50
Germany (GfK)	17
Switzerland (Schweizer Hitparade)	50
