= Nena =

German singer (born 1960)

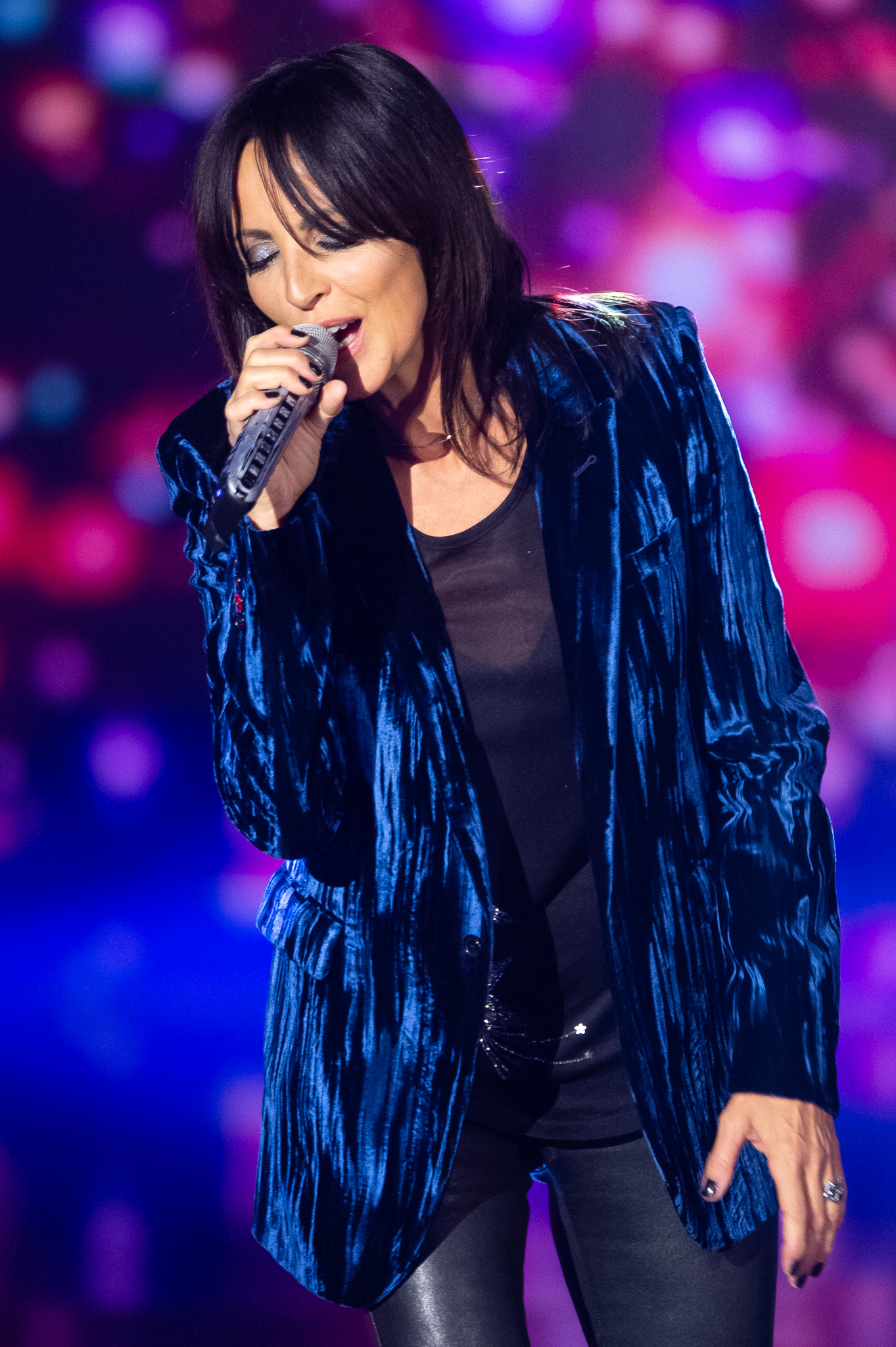
- Nena performing in 2018

Background information
- Born: Gabriele Susanne Kerner; 24 March 1960 (age 66); Hagen, North Rhine-Westphalia, West Germany
- Genres: Neue Deutsche Welle; new wave; synth-pop; pop; pop rock
- Occupations: Singer; songwriter
- Years active: 1979–present
- Labels: CBS, Disney
- Website: nena.de

Gabriele Susanne Kerner (born 24 March 1960), known artistically as Nena, is a German singer. In 1983, as the lead vocalist of the band Nena, she recorded the Neue Deutsche Welle song "99 Luftballons". In the same year, the band re-recorded this song in English as "99 Red Balloons". Nena's re-recording of some of the band's old hit songs as a solo artist, produced by the co-composer of most of them, her former Nena band colleague and keyboard player Uwe Fahrenkrog-Petersen, rekindled her solo career in 2002. Combined with the success of the Nena band years, she has sold over 25 million records, making her the most successful German pop singer in chart history.

== Early life ==
Gabriele Susanne Kerner was born on 24 March 1960 in Hagen, West Germany while her family was living in the nearby town of Breckerfeld. She was the oldest of three children; her father was a teacher. She spent the earliest part of her childhood in Breckerfeld and later lived in Hagen. She acquired her nickname Nena while on a vacation to Mallorca, Spain, with her parents. Nena is a Catalan word meaning "baby girl". In 1977, she left high school before gaining the Abitur, and in the three following years she was trained as a goldsmith, which she left before obtaining her journeyman's licence.

== Musical career ==
=== Beginnings ===
Nena's musical career began on 2 July 1979 when guitarist Rainer Kitzmann founded the Stripes and, on the basis of having seen her dancing at a local disco, asked her to audition for the position of the lead singer. The group, based in Hagen, performed songs with English lyrics and had a minor hit with the song "Ecstasy", but never achieved mainstream success and disbanded on 3 March 1982. However, The Stripes's record company, CBS, offered Nena a record deal if she would move to Berlin and make music with German lyrics. In May 1982, Nena and her boyfriend Rolf Brendel moved to West Berlin, where they met future band members guitarist Carlo Karges, keyboard player Uwe Fahrenkrog-Petersen, and bass player Jürgen Dehmel. Together, they formed the band Nena. In June 1982, they released their first single, "Nur geträumt", which became an instant hit in Germany after the band appeared on the German television show Musikladen on 21 August 1982. The single reportedly sold 40,000 copies the day after the song appeared on the show and reached No. 2 in the German charts.

=== 1982–1987: International success and band breakup ===
In 1983, the band released its first album Nena, which contained the singles "99 Luftballons" and "Leuchtturm". "99 Luftballons" became a number one hit in West Germany and the Netherlands in 1983 and went on to major international chart success the following year, an English version hitting No. 1 in the UK and the original German version hitting No. 2 in the US, behind Van Halen's "Jump". In 1984, Casey Kasem's radio show American Top 40 introduced a "mixed" version of the song, "splicing" the German and English versions together.

In May 1984, while on a tour in the UK, Nena made the headlines of the British red-top press for having unshaved armpits. While not uncommon in continental Europe at the time, this was considered unusual in English-speaking countries to the extent that some consider it an explanation for the commercial failure of the follow-ups to "99 Luftballons". Baffled by the attention generated, Nena asked her manager's girlfriend to shave her and has remained clean shaven ever since. Referring to the "huge indignation" the issue raised, Nena, in her memoirs published in 2005, wrote, "Can a girl from Hagen, who dreams of the big wide world and is in love with Mick Jagger, have no idea that girls can't under any circumstances have hair under the arm? Yes she can. I simply had no idea!"

Although "99 Luftballons" was Nena's only hit in the English-speaking world, the band continued to enjoy success in several European countries in the following years, including the single "Irgendwie, irgendwo, irgendwann". Nena's next international single "Just a Dream" (an English language re-issue of "Nur geträumt") reached No. 70 in the UK charts in 1984; it had "Indianer" on the B-side. A dance version of "Just a Dream" was released in the 1990s to a new audience and became a club anthem. The band split in 1987 and Nena went solo thereafter.

=== 1989: Launch of solo career ===
Nena's first solo album Wunder gescheh'n was released on 5 November 1989. The title track (German for "Miracles Happen"), composed by Nena herself, relates to the fact that Nena was at the time pregnant with twins, but release of the album that appeared just four days before the fall of the Berlin Wall (on 9 November) and the fact that she performed the song at the end of the Konzert für Berlin three days later has ever since associated it with that historic event. It was to prove to be her last major hit of the 20th century as throughout the 1990s her albums and singles – although often critically acclaimed – were less commercially successful. In 1993, following the indifferent performance of her second solo album Bongo Girl, Sony decided not to renew Nena's recording contract, and the label which distributed her third album, RMG Music Entertainment, disappeared shortly afterwards. In 1995, Nena and her growing family moved from Berlin to Hamburg, borrowing money from a family friend after her bank declined to extend credit.

=== 2002: Return to chart success ===
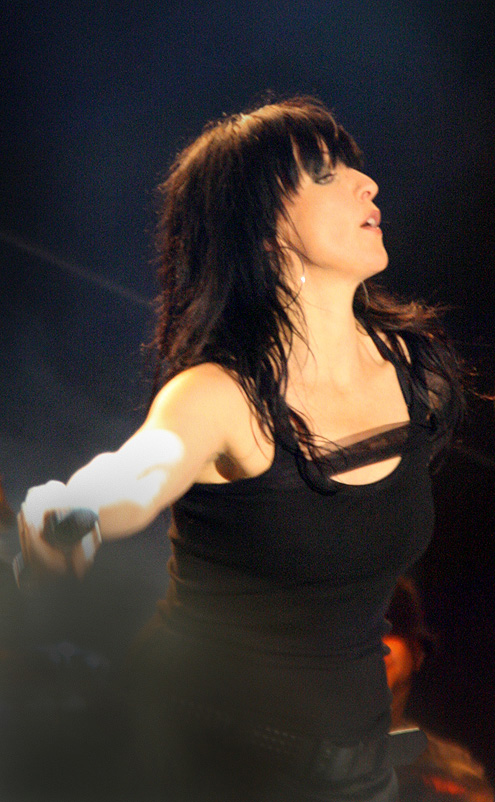
Nena in Vienna on 3 May 2008

In 2002, Nena celebrated her 20th anniversary on stage with the album Nena feat. Nena, a disc produced by Uwe Fahrenkrog-Petersen (her former band colleague and author of almost all of the band's and her chart successes) and consisting of newly arranged recordings of the band's hits from the 1980s. This album marked a comeback for Nena, and spawned a number of successful chart entries. The remake of "Anyplace, Anywhere, Anytime" as an English-German duet with Kim Wilde was a hit in various European countries, reaching the No. 1 spot in the Netherlands and Austria, and No. 3 in Germany, in 2003.

Having regalvanised her career by virtue of the band's 1980s hits, Nena reestablished herself as a force with entirely new material (produced again by Uwe Fahrenkrog-Petersen) with the 2005 album Willst du mit mir gehn which quickly achieved platinum status and climbed to No. 2 in the German charts. The first single from the album, "Liebe ist", reached No. 1 on the German charts in early 2005, and was the theme song for a German telenovela, Verliebt in Berlin. It reached the top position 22 years after "99 Luftballons", the longest span between first and last number one in German chart history.

In October 2007, Nena released a new album entitled Cover Me, made up entirely of cover songs. David Bowie, Rolling Stones and Rammstein are three of the bands covered. She also released the single, "Ich kann nix dafür" in April 2007 for the film, Vollidiot, and her cover of "She's a Rainbow" by the Rolling Stones in the US and the UK. In 2009 she recorded and released a new version of her hit song "99 Luftballons", which more closely follows the 1980s original, in contrast to her 2002 version. This song was first performed in Germany on 6 September 2009. Some parts of the new version are in French.

=== 2009: Own record label ===
Since 2009, Nena's releases have been published by her own record label, The Laugh & Peas Company, which also promotes the work of her daughter's group (Adameva) and that of one of her protegées from The Voice of Germany, Sharron Levy.

Nena released a new single on 18 September 2009, called "Wir sind wahr", and a new album on 2 October: Made in Germany. The autobiographical ballad from the album "In meinem Leben" became her fourteenth top 10 hit in Germany, taking her to 12th position in the all-time list of top 10 hits in Germany, the third highest placed German act and top German female. She also collaborated with the popular techno-rap artists Die Atzen to produce a new single, "Strobo Pop". In 2011, she contributed vocals to the track "Let Go Tonight" by Kevin Costner and Modern West.

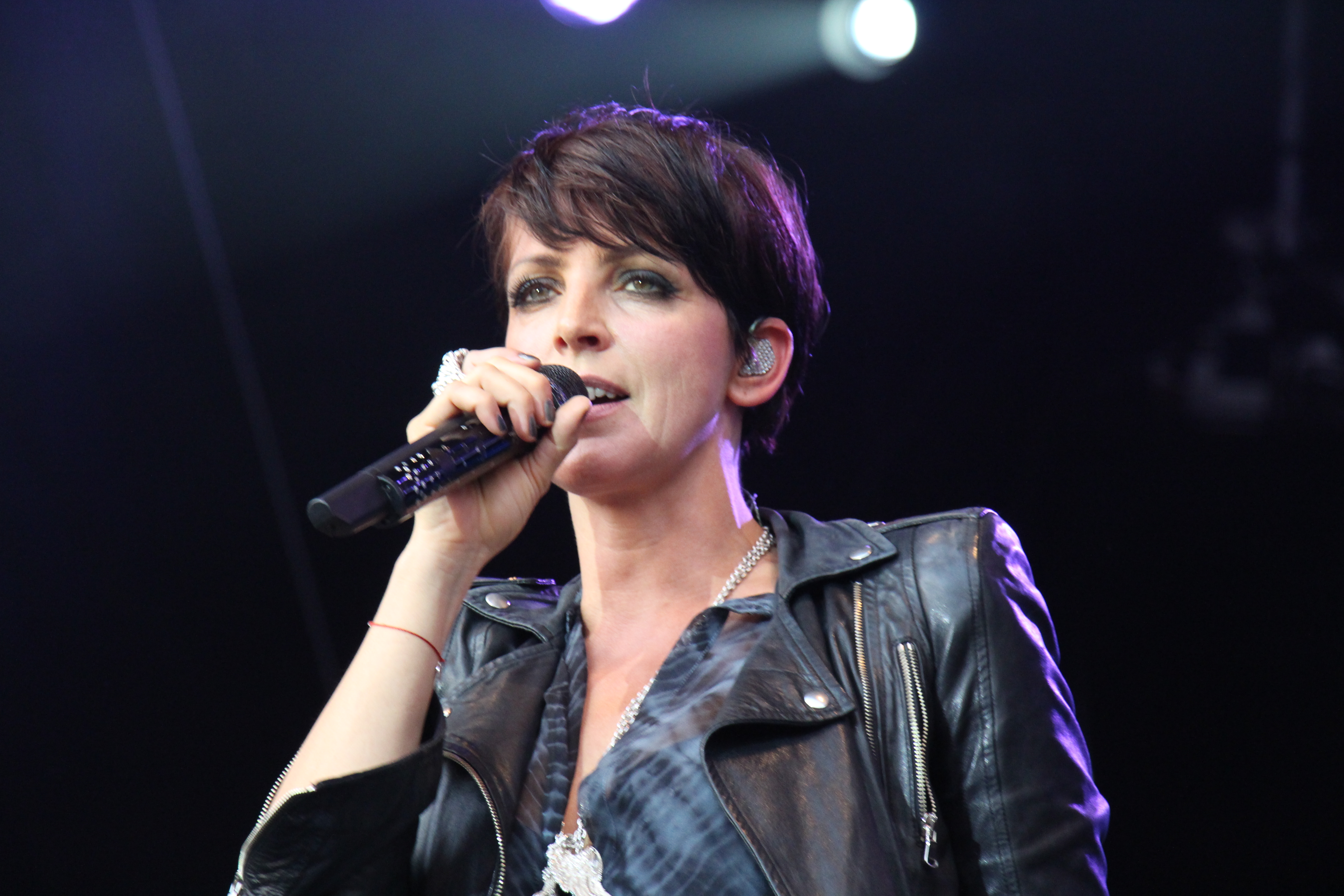
Nena on stage in Munich in 2013

In late 2012, Nena released her 11th solo studio album, Du bist gut, which peaked at No. 2 in the German charts, although the tracks released as singles from the album were not as successful as those from her previous albums since her 2002 comeback.

Nena's next album, Oldschool, which was produced by the German rapper and hip hop artist Samy Deluxe, was released on 27 February 2015. Distribution rights for the album were agreed with Sony Music, 22 years after the company dropped Nena as a recording artist. The album maintained Nena's 21st century chart success pattern (top 5 in Germany, top 10 in Austria, top 20 in Switzerland) but the first two singles released from the album failed to chart. However, for the first time in Nena's career, another track from the album ("Magie"), which was not released as a single, crept into the lower echelons of the German singles chart solely by virtue of downloads. Then, in April 2016, fourteen months after Oldschool's release, the third single from the album, Genau jetzt, returned Nena to the German Top 30 singles chart for the first time in six years.

=== Since 2015: Collaborations and Licht ===
The period between the releases of Oldschool and the 2020 album Licht is the longest in Nena's career between new studio albums. In an era when artists tend to generate more revenue from live performances than recordings, Nena released two live albums and restricted her studio work to one-track collaborations with Zara Larsson, Dave Stewart, Trettmann and fellow guests from the 2016 Sing meinen Song series. In February 2019 Nena provided vocals for the title track and lead single of Schiller's album Morgenstund which entered the German album chart at number 1 and the top 10 of both the Austrian and Swiss album charts. In February 2020 Nena announced new music would be published "soon" and a month later on her 60th birthday released the single "Licht", which became the title track of her next studio album released on 16 October. Licht maintained Nena's 21st century album chart pattern by reaching No. 3 in Germany, No. 9 in Switzerland and No. 11 in Austria, although none of its three singles released ahead of the album charted.

=== Live performances ===
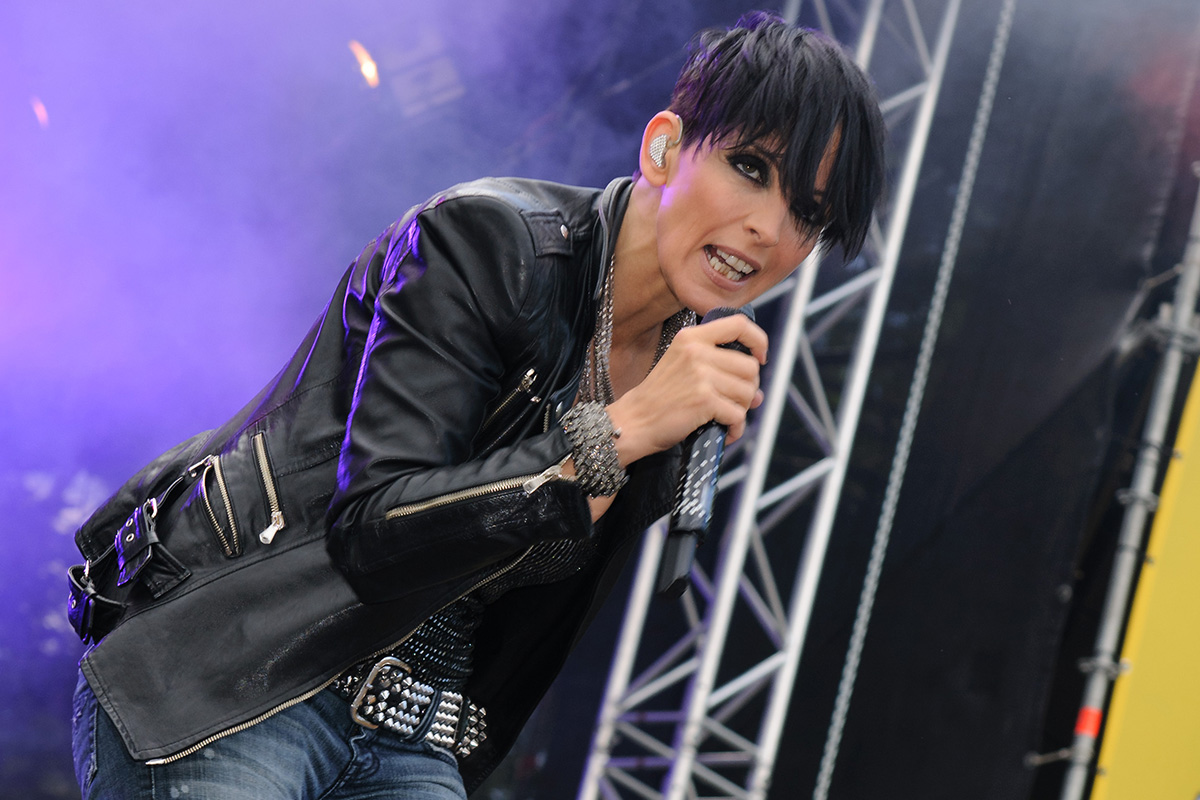
Nena on stage in Dortmund in May 2011

Since 1997, Nena has toured Germany and its neighbouring countries annually, typically performing between 15 and 50 concerts every year.

In 2003, she took the stage during the Howard Jones 20th Anniversary concert at the Shepherd's Bush Empire in London to sing "99 Luftballons", with both German and English lyrics. In 2004, Nena went on stage at the Mayday Music Festival in Dortmund, accompanied by the techno duo Toktok. She sang the song "Bang Bang", and was later joined on stage by DJ Westbam to perform "Oldschool Baby". In March 2015, Nena promoted the release of the Oldschool album with a "club tour" of 16 smaller venues (for 200 to 700 people) including her former primary school. A recording of one of these concerts – at the SO36 club in Berlin on 4 March 2015 – was released as Nena's sixth live album Live at SO36 on 4 March 2016, exactly one year later. Later in 2015, Nena announced her intention to perform live in the US for the first time by way of a similar "club tour", which was initially planned for early 2016 before taking place as a three-date "mini tour" in September and October. During this tour, Nena met Dave Stewart with whom she collaborated to release in March 2018 the single "Be my rebel", the video for which went on to win 40 international awards.

Nena's 2018 Nichts versäumt tour of mainly sold-out concerts in 45 towns and cities attracted in excess of 250,000 fans and won the German Live Entertainment Award (LEA) for "concert hall tour of the year". The concert in Dortmund on 29 June 2018 was recorded for the Nichts versäumt live DVD which was released on 9 November 2018.

=== COVID-19 cancellations and controversy ===
Nena's initial live appearances in 2020 were cancelled due to government restrictions related to the COVID-19 pandemic but were replaced from July that year with the "Niemand hält uns auf" (nobody stops us) series of 12 drive-in, "picnic" and "360" concerts held in accordance with Germany's prevailing social distancing rules. In February 2021 in the debate in Germany about how COVID-19 restrictions should be lifted, Nena sparked controversy by announcing, "there will be no two-class society at my concerts. You're all always welcome. Whether you get vaccinated or not is entirely your decision and should be respected by everyone." Nevertheless, the majority of Nena's concerts originally planned for 2021 were postponed to 2022, although she remained scheduled to appear at a number of festivals.

In March 2021, she posted an Instagram story expressing solidarity with the demonstrators at an anti-lockdown protest in Kassel, Germany, criticising the "inhumane conditions prevailing" due to COVID restrictions. In July 2021, organisers cancelled her appearances in some festivals after Nena encouraged fans to disregard social-distancing rules during a concert in Berlin. In August 2021 Nena took part in a "party for unvaccinated" titled "A Q Midsummer Night's Dream" in Baden-Württemberg, attended by various members of the Reichsbürger movement and Querdenker, with Musikexpress suggesting the Q in the name may be related to QAnon, given the close proximity of the movements. Later that month, organisers cancelled a Nena concert in Bavaria at the last minute due to concern about her views. In September 2021 Nena cancelled all her remaining 2022 concerts in Germany declaring, "all people are welcome at a Nena concert. Our country is going in a totally different direction and I am not going to be a part of it."

In late 2022, with COVID-19 restrictions lifted, Nena announced a full resumption of her pre-pandemic touring pattern in 2023.

== Other work ==
Besides her singing career, Nena has also acted in the 1983 musical comedy film Gib Gas – Ich will Spass (released in the US as Hangin' Out) opposite fellow musician Markus Mörl, and the 1987 invisibility comedy Der Unsichtbare starring Klaus Wennemann and Barbara Rudnik, and voiced the character Saphira for the German dub of the movie Eragon (2006) and the role of the Princess for the German version of Arthur and the Invisibles (2006) alongside Tokio Hotel's Bill Kaulitz. Kaulitz has also stated on many occasions that Nena is his favourite singer.

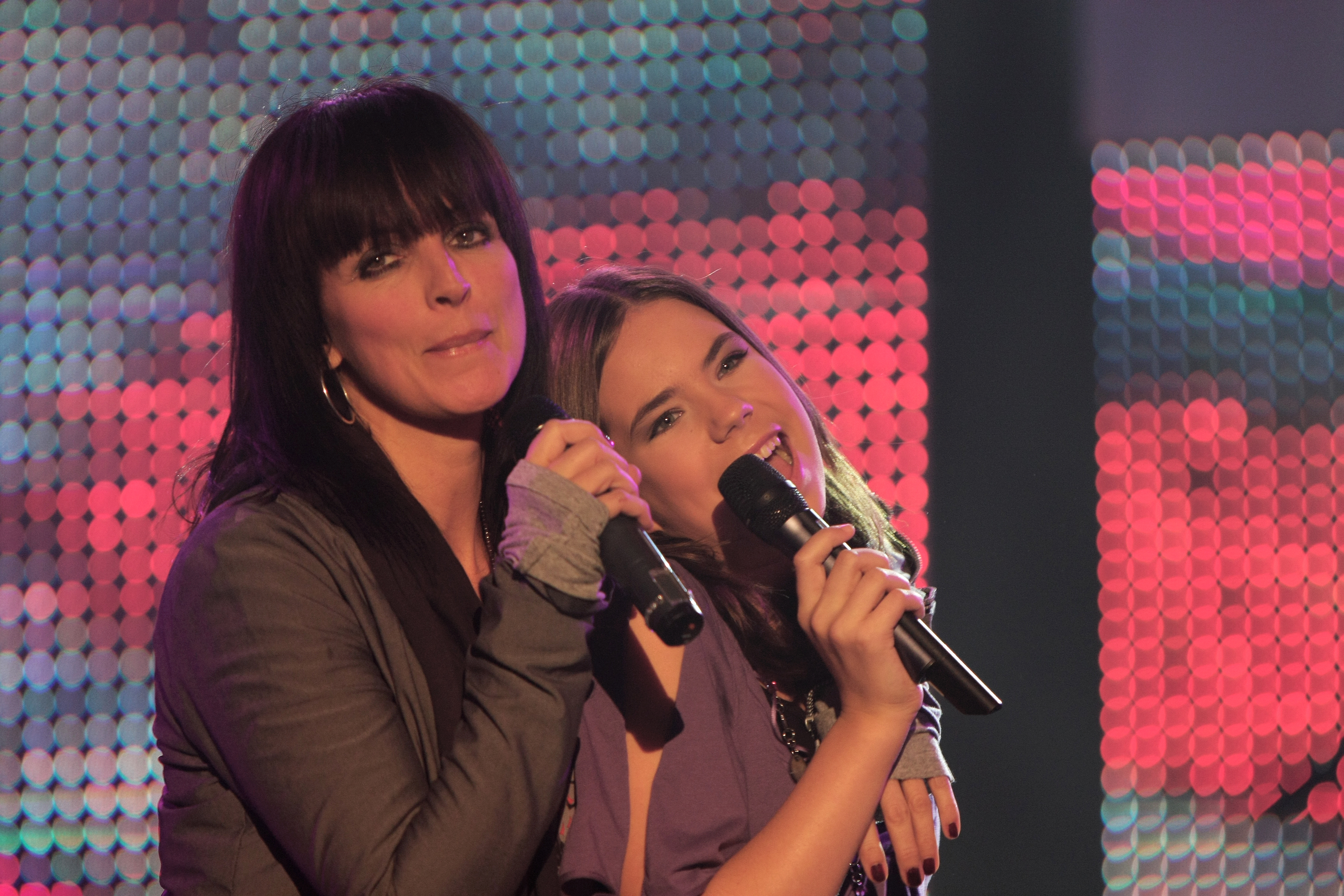
Nena appearing on Dein Song in 2008

In 2008, Nena appeared as one of the coaches on the German TV series Dein Song, in which established artists mentor a youngster to produce a song. Nena was also one of the coaches on The Voice of Germany for three seasons before announcing her withdrawal from the show in March 2014. In April and May 2016 she was one of the participants in the third season of Sing meinen Song, a show in which well-known artists perform each other's songs and judge their favourites. In February 2017 and 2018, Nena appeared as a juror in the fifth and sixth seasons of The Voice Kids together with her daughter Larissa.

In 2007, jointly with her partner Philipp Palm, Thomas Simmerl, and Silke Steinfadt, she founded the Neue Schule Hamburg, a school following the Sudbury model.

Nena wrote an autobiographical book, Willst du mit mir gehn, jointly with Claudia Thesenfitz, a journalist. Nena's contributions are her disparate accounts of various episodes in her life. Most of Thesenfitz's contributions are excerpts from interviews of many of Nena's friends, co-workers, and relatives.

Since becoming a mother, Nena has released a number of albums consisting of songs for children. In the 1990s, she hosted several TV shows, including Metro and Countdown Grand Prix, the German preselection for the Eurovision Song Contest, in 1998.

== Influences and other interests and pursuits ==
In addition to citing the Ramones, David Bowie and Debbie Harry as early influences, Nena's main artistic source of inspiration and her favourite band is the Rolling Stones. Nena has covered their songs in concert and on her 2007 Cover Me album. In 1984 Nena said, "If I hadn't started listening to the Rolling Stones when I was 12 I'd have been a different person, a secretary or something like that."

Although Nena said she disliked the English version of "99 Luftballons" because it was too "blatant" and that the Nena band was neither political nor a protest band, she has occasionally publicly lent her name in support of political causes. She supports "Ehe für alle" (marriage for everyone) and, as a mother of five, a campaign against the German government's plans to scale back the state provision of midwifery services. In March 2021 she expressed her support for the anti-COVID-19 lockdown demonstration in Kassel.

Nena has been a member of various charity ensembles and supergroups including "Band für Afrika" (Germany's equivalent of Band Aid) in 1985 and "Marlon und Freunde" in 2006, whose top 10 hit in Germany, "Lieber Gott", raised funds for flood victims. She also supports local causes and in 2015 ran (in socks) 2.5 kilometres (1.6 mi) in aid of a Stuttgart children's hospice.

Nena is a vegetarian and won the PETA (Germany) award for "Sexiest Vegetarian of the Year 2010". She believes in Jesus and God and says that thanking him for every new day is the cornerstone of her spirituality.

In his 2014 biography of the Nena band, Rolf Brendel, its drummer and Nena's boyfriend at the time, said that although other band members used drugs, Nena never did and frowned upon it. Brendel added, "Nena is naturally stoned, she doesn't need to take drugs."

== Personal life ==
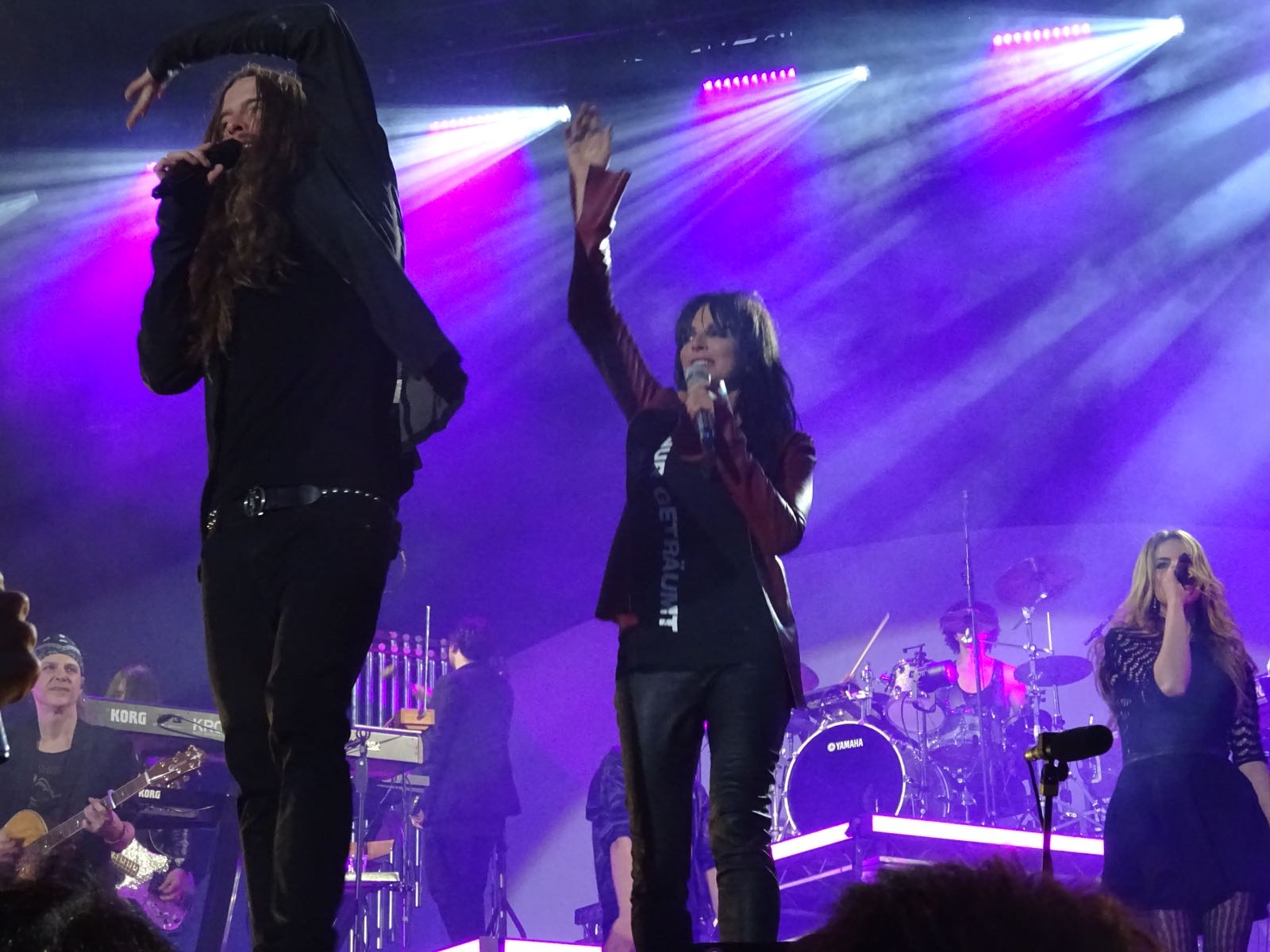
Nena on stage in 2018 flanked by her twin children Sakias and Larissa. Her youngest son Simeon (obscured) is behind her.

Nena and the band's drummer Rolf Brendel split up in 1987. Nena's feelings are described in the song "Jetzt bist du weg" ("Now You Are Gone") from the band's final album, Eisbrecher.

Nena then started dating Swiss actor Benedict Freitag shortly after the band separated in 1987; he is the son of the German actress Maria Becker and Austrian-Swiss actor Robert Freitag. The couple had three children together, the first being Christopher Daniel, who was born disabled allegedly due to medical errors made during the birth that caused Nena to go into cardiac arrest. He died at the age of 11 months. In 1990, they had twins.

After splitting with Freitag, Nena started a relationship with drummer and music producer Philipp Palm from Stuttgart, with whom she had two children. The couple and the four children currently live in Hamburg.

Since 2010, Nena's twins Sakias and Larissa have appeared as back up singers on stage and on her albums, and since 2015 her youngest son Simeon has joined her on stage playing keyboards.

== Discography ==
The Stripes

- 1980: The Stripes

Nena (band)

- 1983: Nena
- 1984: ? (Fragezeichen)
- 1984: 99 Luftballons
- 1985: Feuer und Flamme
- 1985: It's All in the Game
- 1986: Eisbrecher

Nena (solo)

- 1989: Wunder gescheh'n
- 1992: Bongo Girl
- 1994: Und alles dreht sich
- 1997: Jamma nich
- 1998: Wenn alles richtig ist, dann stimmt was nich
- 2001: Chokmah
- 2002: Nena feat. Nena
- 2005: Willst du mit mir gehn
- 2007: Cover Me
- 2009: Made in Germany
- 2012: Du bist gut
- 2015: Oldschool
- 2020: Licht

== Filmography ==
Concert films

- Europatour '84 (Denmark, England, France, 1984)
- Starportrait Nena (Japanese release of Europatour '84, 1984)
- Nena feat. Nena Live (Frankfurt am Main, 11 October 2002)
- Made in Germany: Live in Concert (Berlin, 24 April 2010)
- Nichts versäumt Live (Dortmund, 29 June 2018)

Leading roles

- Gib Gas – Ich will Spass (US title: Hangin' Out) (1983), directed by Wolfgang Büld

Supporting roles

- Der Unsichtbare (1987), directed by Ulf Miehe

Guest appearances

- Richy Guitar (1985), directed by Michael Laux, feat. Die Ärzte
- Day Thieves (ZDF telemovie) (1985), directed by Marcel Gisler
- Die Affäre Semmeling (ZDF miniseries) (2002), directed by Dieter Wedel

Voice roles

- Quest for Camelot (1998) as Kayley (singing voice, German dub)
- Tobias Totz und sein Löwe: des Löwen Freundin (1999) as Lea
- The Abrafaxe – Under The Black Flag (2001) as Anne Bonny
- Return to Neverland (2002) as Jane Darling (singing voice, German dub)
- Madou und das Licht der Fantasie (2003) as Narrator
- Arthur and the Invisibles (2006) as Princess Selenia (German dub)
- Eragon (2006) as Saphira (German dub)

== See also ==
- Mononymous persons

== Sources ==
- Kerner, Nena; Thesenfitz, Claudia (2005). Willst du mit mir gehn. Verlagsgruppe Lübbe. ISBN 3-7857-2135-8. OCLC 62185203. OL 23064015M.
