= Carimate Castle =

Coordinates: 45.7030°N 9.1157°E

Carimate Castle (Italian: Castello di Carimate) is a 14th-century castle located on Piazza Castello #1 in the town of Carimate, Province of Como, Lombardy, Italy.

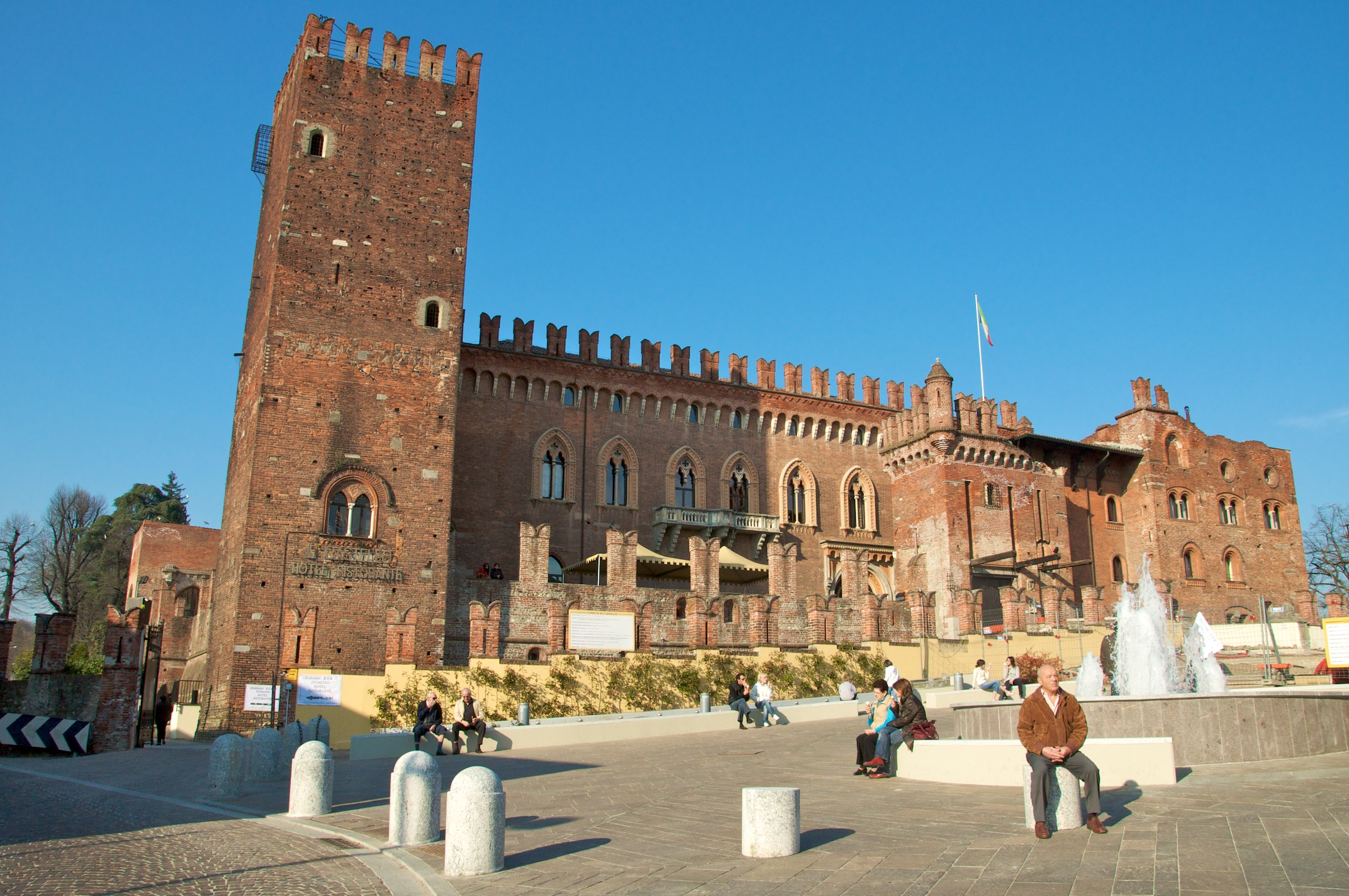
Facade of Castello di Carimate

== History ==
The first documents herald that Luchino I Visconti in 1345 reconstructed a citadel at the site, destroyed by prior conflicts between Como and Milan. By 1380, Bernabò Visconti sold the castle to his wife Beatrice Regina della Scala. The castle passed through a few Visconti hands, and by 1415, Filippo Maria Visconti, granted the castle to a Domenico Aicardi, captain of his stable, as a reward for revealing the conspiracy of the Malatesta, Arcelli and Beccaria. In addition, he was granted the right to add the Visconti suffix to his name. After the transfer of power from the Visconti to the Sfroza, in 1477, Galeazzo Maria Sforza reconfirmed the property as belonging to the heirs of Giorgio Scaramuzza Visconti Aicardi, which include a son Lancelotto Visconti, who in 1481 refurbished again the Castle.

Among the famous guests was Bianca Maria Sforza, daughter of the Duke of Milan, being escorted in 1493 by a large cortege to Germany to become the bride of the Maximilian I, Holy Roman Emperor. In 1496 and 1499, the Maximilian himself stayed in the castle.

In 1626, with the death of Annibale Visconti, last male descendant of Domenico Ajcardi, the castle becomes property ultimately to an Ottavio Visconti, whose family held the castle till 1795, when his last male descendant, Lodovico Visconti, died. In 1800, the castle was sold to the brothers Cristoforo and Carlo Arnaboldi of Como.

In 1874, Bernardo Arnaboldi Gazzaniga, Count of Pirocco, performs another major refurbishment of the castle. Period photographs document how he displayed his large collection of paintings, tapestries, and other artworks in the dwelling.

The large square block of a Gothic-style building has a central courtyard. Traces of a portcullis and drawbridge remain at the entrance, the former gatehouse. At the southwest corner is a tall brick tower, mainly separate from the main block. The entrance has a series of asymmetries to the structure. The peaked windows on the second floor are mullioned; the roofline crenellated, as are parts of the fences on the town-side. The northern side has an elevated terrace above the grounds.

== Modern use ==
The castle, now only 30 minutes outside of Milan, is used as a 50-room hotel and spa, with access to the adjacent nearby golf course, and on-site restaurant. The interior decoration includes neo-gothic ribbing and ceiling decorations added in the 19th century.

Between 1977 and 1987 some rooms of the castle were used as a recording studio under the name Stone Castle Studios. Artists like Yes, Fabrizio De André, Mia Martini, Pooh, Lucio Dalla, Antonello Venditti, Riccardo Cocciante, Nena, Paul Young and Roberto Vecchioni have recorded there.
