= Feuer und Flamme =

Studio album by Nena

Studio album by Nena
- Released: 24 June 1985
- Recorded: 1984–1985
- Studio: Spliff Studio, West Berlin
- Genre: NDW, pop rock, pop
- Length: 46:11 (CD); 44:08 (LP)
- Language: German
- Label: CBS
- Producer: Reinhold Heil

Nena chronology
99 Luftballons (1984)	Feuer und Flamme (1985)	It's All in the Game (1985)

Singles from Feuer und Flamme
- 1. "Irgendwie, irgendwo, irgendwann" Released: 1984; 2. "Feuer und Flamme" Released: 1985; 3. "Haus der drei Sonnen" Released: 1985; 4. "Jung wie du" Released: 1985; 5. "Du kennst die Liebe nicht" Released: 1986

Feuer und Flamme (German for "Fire and Flame", with the additional figurative meaning of "great enthusiasm"), released in 1985, is the third album by German pop band Nena and the fourth studio album of its singer, Gabriele "Nena" Kerner. The album was a success, reaching No. 2 in Germany.

Prompted by the success of 99 Luftballons (1984), which included English-language versions of songs from the band's first two albums, Nena recreated Feuer und Flamme in English as It's All in the Game (1985), with lyrics by Canadian singer Lisa Dalbello. The experiment failed commercially and was not repeated with the band's next album. Gabriele Kerner recorded a new bilingual German-English version of "Anyplace, Anywhere, Anytime" with Kim Wilde in 2002. The duet became a big hit in many European countries, including Germany, Austria, Belgium, Denmark, Switzerland and the Netherlands.

The fifth and final single from the album was "Du kennst die Liebe nicht", however, for the single release, the song was completely re-recorded. The single version was restructured and features different vocals as well as a different instrumental that just sporadically borrows motifs from the album version. It was later included on the compilation Nena die Band (1991).

== Feuer und Flamme track listing ==
No.	Title	Lyrics	Music	Length
1.	"Utopia"	Rolf Brendel	Brendel	3:40
2.	"Haus der drei Sonnen" ("House of the Three Suns")	Carlo Karges	Jörn-Uwe Fahrenkrog-Petersen	4:46
3.	"Jung wie du" ("Young as You")	Karges	Fahrenkrog	4:22
4.	"Es wird schon weitergeh'n" ("It'll Keep Going On")	Karges	Jürgen Dehmel	3:38
5.	"Feuer und Flamme" ("Fire and Flame")	Karges	Karges	3:31
6.	"Gestern Nacht" ("Last Night")	Karges, Nena Kerner, Fahrenkrog	Fahrenkrog	5:18
7.	"Das alte Lied" ("The Old Song")	Karges	Dehmel	4:27
8.	"Du kennst die Liebe nicht" ("You Don't Know (What) Love (Is)")	Kerner	Kerner	4:14
9.	"Ein Brief" ("A Letter")	Kerner	Fahrenkrog	4:52
10.	"Irgendwie, irgendwo, irgendwann" ("Somehow, Somewhere, Sometime")	Karges	Fahrenkrog	7:15

This track list represents the CD version of Feuer und Flamme. The LP edition has tracks 4 and 9 swapped. Length of track 10 on LP is 5:14 due to the much shorter (partly edited out) instrumental intro. On some CD releases, length of track 3 is 5:09.

It's All in the Game

Studio album by Nena
- Released: 10 November 1985
- Recorded: 1985
- Genre: NDW, pop rock, pop
- Length: 46:11
- Language: English
- Label: CBS
- Producer: Reinhold Heil

Nena chronology
Feuer und Flamme (1985)	It's All in the Game (1985)	Eisbrecher (1986)

Singles from It's All in the Game
- 1. "It's All in the Game" Released: 1985

== It's All in the Game track listing ==
All English lyrics are written by Lisa Dalbello, except for bonus tracks 11–13.

No.	Title	Original title	Length
1.	"Utopia"	"Utopia"	3:40
2.	"It's All in the Game"	"Haus der drei Sonnen"	4:46
3.	"Young as You"	"Jung wie du"	4:22
4.	"Auf Wiederseh'n"	"Es wird schon weitergeh'n"	3:38
5.	"Warning Signs"	"Gestern Nacht"	5:18
6.	"Woman on Fire"	"Feuer und Flamme"	3:31
7.	"Let's Humanize"	"Das alte Lied"	4:27
8.	"You Don't Know What Love Is"	"Du kennst die Liebe nicht"	4:14
9.	"Are You Awake?"	"Ein Brief"	4:52
10.	"Anyplace, Anywhere, Anytime"	"Irgendwie, irgendwo, irgendwann"	7:15

2008 reissue bonus tracks
No.	Title	Original title	Length
11.	"At the Movies"	"Kino"	2:58
12.	"Just a Dream" (Mega Dream mix)	"Nur geträumt"	6:41
13.	"99 Red Balloons" (club mix)	"99 Luftballons"	4:43
14.	"It's All in the Game" (12-inch remix)	"Haus der drei Sonnen"	6:32

Of the bonus tracks on the 2008 reissue, "At the Movies" was first released in 1984 as a single coupled with its German original, "Kino", from Nena (1983); "Just a Dream" and "99 Red Balloons" are tracks from 99 Luftballons (1984), here remixed; and the remix of "It's All in the Game" reprises the title track of the present album.
