= The Stripes =

German pop band

- Origin: Hagen, North Rhine-Westphalia, West Germany
- Genres: Pop
- Years active: 1979–1982
- Labels: CBS
- Spinoffs: Nena, Nena (band)
- Past members: Gabriele Susanne "Nena" Kerner; Rolf Brendel; Rainer Kitzmann; Frank Röhler

The Stripes were a German pop band founded on 2 July 1979 in the town of Hagen by Rainer Kitzmann, who played guitar. The lead singer was Gabriele Susanne Kerner, before she became known as Nena Kerner, who would later form the band Nena. Another future member of the band Nena, Rolf Brendel (Nena's boyfriend at the time), played the drums. Frank Röhler played bass. The band was known for singing exclusively in English. They released five singles and one studio album, after which they split up on 3 March 1982. Their song "Ecstasy" was a minor hit.

== Discography ==
=== Studio album ===
The Stripes was the band's only album and the first studio album of its singer, Gabriele "Nena" Kerner. Initially an LP record, it was re-released on CD in 1997 and again in 2004 with bonus tracks which were previously exclusive to some singles.

==== Track listing ====
Side A contains tracks 1–6 and side B contains tracks 7–13.

LP, CD
No.	Title	Length
1.	"Strangers"	3:06
2.	"Tell Me Your Name"	3:15
3.	"Observer"	2:32
4.	"Don't You Think That I'm a Lady?"	3:16
5.	"Leaving the Suburbs"	3:55
6.	"I'm Not..."	3:00
7.	"Tres Chichi"	2:31
8.	"You Must Be Good for Something"	2:49
9.	"On the Telephone"	3:13
10.	"Weekend Love"	2:17
11.	"Kicks in Berlin"	3:18
12.	"01:59"	2:01
13.	"Radio in Stereo"	2:09

2004 CD re-release bonus tracks
No.	Title	Length
14.	"Ecstasy"	2:42
15.	"Normal Types"	2:51
16.	"Lose Control"	3:03

==== Notes ====
- Track 8 is a cover of a Hall & Oates song

==== Credits ====
- Gabriele Kerner – vocals
- Rainer Kitzmann – guitar
- Rolf Brendel – drums and percussion
- Frank Röhler – bass guitar
- Andy Kirnberger – keyboard, assorted guitars, singing harmony and producer
- Manfred Nauner – recording engineer at Tonstudio Hiltpoltstein
- Nigel Jobson – English vocals on tracks 4 and 9, recording and mixing engineer at Hotline Studios
- Udo Arndt – mixing engineer at Audio Tonstudio, Berlin

=== Singles ===
All singles were released as 7-inch vinyl records at 45 RPM under the CBS label. "Ecstasy" and the B-sides "Normal Types" and "Lose Control" were included as bonus tracks on the re-release of the studio album.

Title	Year	B-side
"Ecstasy"	1979	"Normal Types"
"Strangers"	1980	"Lose Control"
"Tell Me Your Name"	1980	"Weekend Love"
"Strangers"	1980	"Observer"
"Don't You Think That I'm a Lady?"	1981	"On the Telephone"

== Epilogue ==
Nena has often advertised her involvement with The Stripes – in 2003 when she made a guest appearance at Howard Jones's 20th anniversary concert in London, she wore a top emblazoned with the name of the band and the bonus tracks of the Made in Germany Live album included live performances of two of the Stripes' songs recorded at a Berlin concert in November 2009.
