= Irgendwie, irgendwo, irgendwann =

1984 single by Nena

Single by Nena

from the album Feuer und Flamme
- B-side: "Ganz oben" (live)
- Released: 5 October 1984
- Recorded: Summer 1984
- Length: 4:10
- Label: CBS
- Songwriters: Jörn-Uwe Fahrenkrog-Petersen; Carlo Karges
- Producers: Reinhold Heil; Manne Praeker

Nena singles chronology
"Lass mich dein Pirat sein" (1984)	"Irgendwie, irgendwo, irgendwann" (1984)	"Just a dream" (1984)

Music video
- Video on YouTube

"Irgendwie, irgendwo, irgendwann" (German for "anyhow, anywhere, anytime”) is a 1984 song by Nena written by band members Jörn-Uwe Fahrenkrog-Petersen and Carlo Karges. It was a commercial success in Europe. Released initially as a single, it was included on Nena's 1985 album Feuer und Flamme. Many variations and covers of the song have appeared, including samples and foreign language versions, most notably the English language "Anyplace, Anywhere, Anytime". Its various incarnations have charted over a 37-year period and in three different languages. The song regained a certain level of popularity with younger generations when it was featured in the acclaimed German science fiction television series Dark.

== Original version ==
Described by Allmusic as a "towering all-time Nena classic", "Irgendwie, irgendwo, irgendwann" (German for "somehow, somewhere, sometime") is a love song, the singer saying that in the mists of time and space, now is the time for some tenderness "before the night returns". Although she didn't write them herself, Nena has suggested that the hookline ("Give me your hand, I'll build you a sandcastle somehow somewhere sometime") refers to building sandcastles in Potsdamer Square in Berlin during the Cold War. Cold War Berlin is where Nena spent the few years immediately before becoming famous, at which time Potsdamer Platz was a desolate No Man's Land in the shadow of the Berlin Wall. The tender lyric is set to a rumbustious, free-flowing and catchy tune.

"Irgendwie, irgendwo, irgendwann" reached No. 3 on the German chart in 1984. It was the last top-five entry Nena was to have in her homeland for 19 years until in 2003 she reprised the song as the duet "Anyplace, Anywhere, Anytime" with Kim Wilde as part of her 2002 career revival brought about by the triple platinum Nena feat. Nena album. The song also featured in all three seasons of the 2017-2020 Netflix German science fiction thriller series Dark.

=== Music video ===
At the beginning of the music video a garage door opens, Nena emerges and runs through spider webs before finding a car. In the next scene, a group of people are seen removing the vehicle. Nena then appears in a pyramid and awakens a mummy (played by the band's keyboard player, Jörn-Uwe Fahrenkrog-Petersen) by touching it. A soldier (played by the band's guitarist, Carlo Karges) then joins Nena, trapped in the car. The video then cuts to the band performing the song at a live concert. Next the band's bassist (Jürgen Dehmel) is seen running away from a mechanical dragon before finding a safe spot where Nena joins him. After this, Nena is seen as a samurai but falls into a hole and is rescued by Rolf Brendel, the band's drummer and Nena's then boyfriend. In the remainder of the video, a few excerpts are repeated. The video was shot at a film studio in London and directed by Nick Morris.

=== Track listings ===
- 7-inch single

A. "Irgendwie, irgendwo, irgendwann" – 4:10
B. "Ganz oben" (live) – 4:38

- 12-inch maxi single

A. "Irgendwie, irgendwo, irgendwann" (special 12″ dance-mix) – 7:15
B1. "Ganz oben" (live) – 3:53
B2. "Der Bus is' schon weg" (live) – 2:44

=== Charts ===
==== Weekly charts ====
Chart (1984)	Peak position
Austria (Ö3 Austria Top 40)	7
Belgium (Ultratop 50 Flanders)	29
Europe (European Hot 100 Singles)	28
Netherlands (Dutch Top 40)	10
Netherlands (Single Top 100)	13
Switzerland (Schweizer Hitparade)	2
West Germany (GfK)	3

==== Year-end charts ====
Chart (2003)	Position
Netherlands (Dutch Top 40)	78
Netherlands (Single Top 100)	86
West Germany (Media Control)	49

== Jan Delay version ==
"Irgendwie, irgendwo, irgendwann"

Single by Jan Delay featuring Dennis Dubplate and Absolute Beginner

from the album Das gibt's nur einmal
- Released: 4 December 1999
- Recorded: 1998
- Length: 5:30
- Label: Grönland; EMI Electrola
- Songwriters: Uwe Fahrenkrog-Petersen; Carlo Karges
- Producers: Jan Eissfeldt; Matthias Arfmann

Jan Delay singles chronology
"Irgendwie, irgendwo, irgendwann" (1999)	"Ich möchte nicht, dass ihr meine Lieder singt" (2001)

In 1999, Jan Delay with Denyo and Beginner covered "Irgendwie, irgendwo, irgendwann" for the compilation album Das gibt's nur einmal of the TV project Pop 2000 by ARD and Viva. Just like the original this cover was also successful in Germany. Unlike the original, this version contains a rap verse.

The music video was filmed on a beach, starting with Jan Delay with a dog in his arms, and some women. While he performs the song, you can see fish and a couple of women swimming in the water. They also keep a few signs up showing among other things "77" and "Nazis out". At the end of the music video a radio is thrown into the water.

=== Track listings ===
- CD single
1. "Irgendwie, irgendwo, irgendwann" – 5:30
2. "B-Seite" – 4:08
- 12-inch single

A1. "Irgendwie, irgendwo, irgendwann" – 5:31
A2. "Irgendwie, irgendwo, irgendwann" (instrumental) – 5:29
B1. "B-Seite" – 4:09
B2. "B-Seite" (instrumental) – 4:12

=== Charts ===
==== Weekly charts ====
Chart (2000)	Peak position
Austria (Ö3 Austria Top 40)	2
Europe (Eurochart Hot 100)	10
Germany (GfK)	2
Switzerland (Schweizer Hitparade)	5

==== Year-end charts ====
Chart (1999)	Position
Germany (Media Control)	64

Chart (2000)	Position
Austria (Ö3 Austria Top 40)	21
Europe (Eurochart Hot 100)	93
Germany (Media Control)	33
Switzerland (Schweizer Hitparade)	54

== Anyplace, Anywhere, Anytime ==
"Anyplace, Anywhere, Anytime"

Single by Nena and Kim Wilde

from the album Nena feat. Nena
- B-side: "Irgendwie, irgendwo, irgendwann"; "Nur geträumt"
- Released: 18 May 2003
- Recorded: 2002
- Studio: On Air (Berlin); Genatec (Berlin); Jeopark (Hamburg); Babak (Oberkirch)
- Length: 4:02
- Label: Warner
- Composer: Uwe Fahrenkrog-Petersen
- Lyricists: Carlo Karges; Lisa Dalbello
- Producers: Uwe Fahrenkrog-Petersen; Jeo

Nena singles chronology
"Wunder geschehen" (2003)	"Anyplace, Anywhere, Anytime" (2003)	"Nur geträumt" (2003)

Kim Wilde singles chronology
"Born to Be Wild" (2002)	"Anyplace, Anywhere, Anytime" (2003)	"You Came (2006)" (2006)

Music video
- Nena & Kim Wilde "Anyplace Anywhere Anytime" on Vimeo

An all-English version of "Irgendwie, irgendwo, irgendwann" titled "Anyplace, Anywhere, Anytime" was included on Nena's 1985 album It's All in the Game (the English-language version of Feuer und Flamme), but has never been released as a single.

In 2002, celebrating twenty years of the beginning of her success in the former Nena band, Nena recorded a new album, Nena feat. Nena, which included a new version of the song, with a much slower tempo and more rock influences. Subsequently, another iteration of the new version was released, this time with the combined English and German lyrics, performed along with English singer Kim Wilde. The video was filmed outside the London Guildhall and in and around Change Alley, London EC3.

It was a commercial success across continental Europe, but was not released in the United Kingdom.

Nena and Wilde appeared together several times in 2003 to promote the single on various TV programmes, having first performed the song live during Nena's October 2002 concert in Frankfurt marking the 20th anniversary of her first hit record. Since then they collaborated again in 2006 on the remake of "You Keep Me Hanging On" on Wilde's Never Say Never album. They subsequently performed "Anyplace, Anywhere, Anytime" on a German TV programme marking Nena's 50th birthday in 2010 and at a joint concert in Saasveld, Netherlands, on 13 December 2014.

=== Track listings ===
- German CD single
1. "Anyplace, Anywhere, Anytime" (radio version) – 3:42
2. "Anyplace, Anywhere, Anytime" (new version) – 4:03
- German CD maxi single
1. "Anyplace, Anywhere, Anytime" (radio version) – 3:42
2. "Anyplace, Anywhere, Anytime" (new version) – 4:03
3. "Irgendwie, irgendwo, irgendwann" (new version) – 4:02
4. "Nur geträumt" (new version) – 2:54

=== Charts ===
==== Weekly charts ====
Chart (2003)	Peak position
Austria (Ö3 Austria Top 40)	1
Belgium (Ultratop 50 Flanders)	2
Belgium (Ultratip Bubbling Under Wallonia)	4
Denmark (Tracklisten)	19
Europe (European Hot 100 Singles)	11
Germany (GfK)	3
Hungary (Rádiós Top 40)	21
Netherlands (Dutch Top 40)	1
Netherlands (Single Top 100)	1
Switzerland (Schweizer Hitparade)	9

==== Year-end charts ====
Chart (2003)	Position
Austria (Ö3 Austria Top 40)	24
Belgium (Ultratop Flanders)	34
Germany (Media Control GfK)	32
Netherlands (Dutch Top 40)	3
Netherlands (Single Top 100)	10
Switzerland (Schweizer Hitparade)	36

==== Decade-end charts ====
Chart (2000–09)	Position
Netherlands (Single Top 100)	54

== Other notable recorded versions ==
- 1992: Herbert Grönemeyer
- 2000: Max Raabe
- 2000: The Smurfs (Sag mir wie, sag mir wo, sag mir wann)
- 2001: DJs@Work (Someday)
- 2003: Otto Waalkes (Hänsel und Gretel)
- 2003: Guildo Horn
- 2005: Insania (I.I.I.)
- 2006: Komu Vnyz
- 2008: Adoro (band), Symphonity
- 2016: Titus Probst
- 2021: A German/Italian language version entitled "Ci Sarai (Irgendwie)" by Giovanni Zarrella featuring Pietro Lombardi which reached number 76 in the German singles chart
- 2021: Phil the Beat and ILIRA entitled "Anytime"

== Satirical version ==
In March 2016 the song was used as a base for a satirical song on Turkish president Recep Tayyip Erdoğan by the TV magazine extra 3 of German broadcaster NDR titled "Erdowie, Erdowo, Erdogan" ("Erdo-how, Erdo-where, Erdo-when," though the last one is also a play on words, since the German word Wahn means delusion or craziness). This version of the song sparked a minor diplomatic incident with Turkish government officials reportedly demanding of Germany's ambassador to Turkey that NDR desist from broadcasting it, causing a Streisand Effect where the video received millions of views and was subtitled in multiple languages, and indirectly sparked the Böhmermann affair.
