= Licht (Nena album) =

Studio album by Nena
- Released: 16 October 2020
- Length: 43:38
- Language: German
- Label: Laugh + Peas
- Producers: Marcel Heym; Samuel "Maduh" Kerner; Simeon "Zinoe" Kerner; Derek von Krogh; Quoi; Mirko Schaffer

Nena chronology
Nichts versäumt (2018)	Licht (2020)

Singles from Licht
- 1. "Licht" Released: 24 March 2020; 2. "Wandern" Released: 14 August 2020; 3. "Forelle" Released: 25 September 2020

Licht (English: Light) is the thirteenth studio album by the German pop singer Nena. It was released by Laugh + Peas Entertainment on 16 October 2020, over 5 1/2 years after Nena's previous studio album, Oldschool (2015). Licht involves vocal, songwriting and production contributions from all four of Nena's surviving children as well as from the father of two of them, her longstanding partner Philipp Palm. One week after its release, it entered the German Albums Chart at number three.

== Background and origins ==
Nena started work on Licht two years before its release by writing the song "Wandern". According to Nena, the main theme of the album is learning from life's "journey" and that although anger and tension are inevitable, everything can work out fine if we "completely redesign our coexistence with the planet for the benefit of all involved". Released in the midst of the COVID-19 pandemic, Nena aroused controversy a few days before the album's release with a post on social media stating that her "deep faith in God and trust in life" enabled her to "break down the scare tactics pouring in from outside," which some commentators construed as evidence of her being a "COVID-denier". Nena's management team rebutted this charge although they did say that the singer was critical of some measures, such as compulsory mask-wearing for children and family members being denied access to dying relatives.

== Reception ==
Professional ratings
Review scores
Source	Rating
laut.de	2/5 stars

Initial reviews of the album were mixed. laut.de editor Kerstin Kratochwill wrote that, although the album contained "pleasantly surprising beautiful synth melodies" it was prevented from being a "good pop album" by Nena's "annoying 'everything will be fine' mantra". T-Online also made reference to Nena's coronavirus comments but dismissed speculation that the album would show Nena to be a COVID-denier or taken in by conspiracy theories. Instead, the review concludes the album captured the Zeitgeist by "sending a positive signal in a rather gloomy period" although it was not a "beacon in Nena's discography". On the other hand, an entirely positive early review appeared in Sounds and Books, which described the album as joining the "long list of compelling Nena albums" and that "she keeps getting better".

Later reviews of the album were more consistently positive. Almost three months after the album's release, Swedish online magazine JPS Media compared Licht favourably with Nena's work in her 1980s heyday. The article cited a number of tracks, including the "life affirming title track, the Summer pop track (Karawane) and 'Auf einmal warst du da'…the groovy piano ballad taking Nena outside her vocal comfort zone," as evidence of Nena, "now singing better and with more nuanced expression…having aged pleasantly in more than the most obvious way." Published at the same time as the JPS Media review, Swiss online magazine Blue News also assessed Licht in the context of Nena's life and career. Giving Nena credit for emerging through the "wonderful highs and terrible lows" of her life "still on stage….a little bit shrill, wild, non-conformist and full of energy," the article describes Licht as a "great pop album" which nearly three months after its release, "I still listen to from start to finish."

== Chart performance ==
Licht debuted and peaked at number three on the German Album Charts in the week of 23 October 2020. It marked Nena's seventh consecutive top ten album in Germany. Licht also entered the Swiss and the Austrian Albums Chart at numbers 9 and 11 respectively.

== Track listing ==
Licht tracklisting
No.	Title	Writer(s)	Producer(s)	Length
1.	"Licht"	Nena Kerner; Robin Grubert; Philipp Palm; Mirko Schaffer; Mario Wesser	Marcel Heym; Schaffer	3:44
2.	"Da Da Dam (Ich geb dir mein ja)"	N. Kerner; John Andrews; Larissa Kerner; Sakias Kerner; Samuel "Maduh" Kerner; Derek von Krogh; Paul di Leo; Philipp Palm; Annika Line Trost	Heym; von Krogh	2:53
3.	"Zurück in die Zukunft"	N. Kerner; Silvio Brunner; Christoph Erkes; Samuel Kerner; Heym; Christian Meyerholz; Nicole Schettler; Samy Sorge; Sebastian Winkler	Heym; Quoi	3:29
4.	"Forelle" (featuring Maduh)	N. Kerner; Samuel Kerner	Heym; Maduh	3:43
5.	"Wandern"	N. Kerner	Zinoe; von Krogh	3:45
6.	"Shine on"	N. Kerner; Samuel Kerner; John Andrews; von Krogh; di Leo; Palm	von Krogh	3:46
7.	"Karawane"	N. Kerner; von Krogh; Palm	von Krogh	4:44
8.	"Galaxien" (featuring Larissa Kerner)	N. Kerner; L. Kerner; von Krogh	von Krogh	3:38
9.	"Zimmer"	N. Kerner; Erkes; Saskias Kerner; Meyerholz; Schettler	Quoi	3:37
10.	"Auf einmal warst du da"	N. Kerner; Simeon "Zinoe" Kerner; Leon Weick	Heym; Zinoe; von Krogh	4:29
11.	"Alles neu"	N. Kerner; Simeon Kerner; Trost	Zinoe; von Krogh	5:51
Total length:				43:38

== Charts ==
Chart performance for Licht
Chart (2020)	Peak position
Austrian Albums (Ö3 Austria)	11
German Albums (Offizielle Top 100)	3
Swiss Albums (Schweizer Hitparade)	9
