= Wunder gescheh'n =

Studio album by Nena
- Released: 5 November 1989
- Studios: Picar, Stein am Rhein, Switzerland
- Length: 38:00
- Languages: German; English; French
- Labels: CBS; Epic
- Producers: Walter Keiser; Phil Carmen; Gareth Jones; Jürgen Dehmel

Nena chronology
| Eisbrecher (1986) | Wunder gescheh'n (1989) | Nena die Band (1991) |

Nena solo chronology
| Wunder gescheh'n (1989) | Bongo Girl (1992) |

Singles from Wunder gescheh'n
- 1. "Wunder gescheh'n" Released: 9 October 1989; 2. "Du bist überall" Released: 1990; 3. "Im Rausch der Liebe" Released: 1990

Wunder gescheh'n (German for "Miracles Happen") is the debut solo studio album by German pop singer Nena. It was released on November 5 1989, two years after the demise of her band in fall 1987. The title track, "Du bist überall" and "Im Rausch der Liebe" were released as singles and had moderate success.

== Theme ==
The album was written (several tracks by Nena herself) and recorded at a time when she was pregnant with twins and shortly after the death of her first child at the age of 11 months. Many of the songs focus on Nena's feelings towards her lost son and her hopes and fears concerning her unborn children. One of them, "Weisses Schiff", is often introduced by Nena at her live concerts as one of her favourite songs. The song describes the thoughts of a person watching a ship of young and old souls sailing into the distance, expressing the hope that when her time comes, she'll be welcomed aboard.

== Title track ==
Nena wrote "Wunder gescheh'n" ("Miracles Happen") whilst staying in hospital caring for her severely disabled first son. In her 2005 memoirs Nena describes the "miracle" she witnessed when a hospital physiotherapist first attended to him when he was several months old. "Obviously this cleared a lot up inside him," she wrote, "because very suddenly he began to moan pleasantly and then a longer extended deep sigh came out of him. For a "normal" mother and a "normal" child nothing could be more usual but this brought tears to my eyes and I couldn't believe it. I fell on my knees and thanked God for this moment because I was hearing the voice of my baby for the first time."

Release of the album happened to be just a few days before the fall of the Berlin Wall (9 November 1989), and Nena, still pregnant at the time, performed the album's title track at the hastily convened Konzert für Berlin (12 November 1989) marking this historic event. Ever since, the song and its meaning are associated with that context.

Since then Nena has constantly reworked the song, starting with a "country" version being performed during her 1993 Bongo Girl tour. Most significantly, two different versions (one "with friends" becoming a Top 10 hit in Germany) came out on the triple platinum album Nena feat. Nena (2002) which rekindled her career in the German-speaking countries. Another – heavier – version of the track appeared in the DVD Made in Germany Live (2010) and further live versions on the "De luxe bonus edition" of her album Du bist gut (2012) and on Live at SO36 (2016). In January 2016 Nena and her son Sakias accompanied the "Musical Voices S.I.E.G." choir to perform a choral arrangement of the song in a church in Sankt Augustin.

The song is a permanent feature and highlight of Nena's concerts, the audience usually being required to sing the third rendition of the chorus unaccompanied.

== Track listing ==
| No. | Title | Title translation | Length |
|---|---|---|---|
| 1. | "Wunder gescheh'n" | "Miracles Happen" | 3:41 |
| 2. | "Du bist überall" | "You Are Everywhere" | 5:13 |
| 3. | "Hero" | | 4:18 |
| 4. | "Schlaflied" | "Lullaby" | 1:37 |
| 5. | "Weisses Schiff" | "White Ship" | 4:27 |
| 6. | "Im Rausch der Liebe" | "In the Frenzy of Love" | 3:47 |
| 7. | "La vie c'est la chance" | French: "Life Is a Chance" | 3:43 |
| 8. | "Keine Langeweile" | "No Boredom" | 3:30 |
| 9. | "Steht auf" | "Stand Up" | 4:02 |
| 10. | "Abschied" | "Farewell" | 3:37 |

== Charts ==
| Chart (1989) | Peak position |
|---|---|
| German Albums (Offizielle Top 100) | 23 |
