= Nena (band) =

German Neue Deutsche Welle band (1981–1987)

- 1983 promotional photograph depicting the band Nena

Background information
- Origin: West Berlin, West Germany
- Genre: Neue Deutsche Welle
- Years active: 1981–1987
- Labels: CBS; Epic
- Past members: Nena; Carlo Karges; Jürgen Dehmel; Rolf Brendel; Uwe Fahrenkrog-Petersen
- Website: www.nena.de

Nena was a West German Neue Deutsche Welle band formed in West Berlin in 1981 and active until 1987. In 1983 and 1984, their German-language song "99 Luftballons" (and its English version, "99 Red Balloons") reached number one in the singles charts of countries around the world.

== History ==
=== Formation and rise ===
The band was formed in 1981 when vocalist Gabriele Kerner (Nena) came to West Berlin with drummer Rolf Brendel, her boyfriend at the time. There they assembled the other members of the band, which took its name from their lead singer's nickname (a slight corruption of the Spanish for "little girl"), which she had acquired as a toddler during a family holiday to Catalonia, Spain.

The band wrote all of their songs themselves, typically working in pairs. They became overnight sensations in Germany when they performed their debut single "Nur geträumt" on German TV in August 1982, Nena herself wearing a distinctive short red miniskirt. The single reached number 2 in the German charts, a position it occupied for 6 weeks, and also climbed high in the Austrian, Belgian, Dutch and Swiss charts. In early 1983 the follow-up single "99 Luftballons" spent a further 7 weeks at number 2 before finally reaching the top slot, a position the debut album matched.

By the time the band released its second album ? (Fragezeichen) in Germany in January 1984, "99 Luftballons" was starting to climb the US charts, where it reached number 2 and became one of the most successful non-English-language tracks in US Billboard chart history. With the English version of the song ("99 Red Balloons") achieving the number 1 position in the UK, the band became internationally famous and in 1984 gave concerts and made TV appearances in Scandinavia, the UK, Spain and France as well as a 7-date tour (on consecutive nights) of Japan. An international album 99 Luftballons which comprised a combination of English and German versions of tracks from the first two German albums, performed respectably, reaching number 31 in the UK charts in mid-1984.

Whilst enjoying international prominence on the back of "99 Luftballons", the band continued to enjoy domestic success in Germany with a string of hits in 1984 and the first half of 1985. The ? (Fragezeichen) album matched the band's debut album in making it to the top spot and spawned two of the band's best-known and most successful singles (the title track and "Rette mich"). They also had success with a couple of songs which would eventually be included on their third studio album, Feuer und Flamme, most notably "Irgendwie, irgendwo, irgendwann".

=== Decline and discontinuation ===
The band was unable to follow up the international success of "99 Luftballons". An English version of "Nur geträumt" ("Just a Dream") failed to make the Billboard Hot 100 and only reached number 70 in the UK charts. A second English album (It's All in the Game, an English version of Feuer und Flamme) failed to chart.

The band's fortunes in its homeland also began to turn in the second half of 1985, with disappointing attendance levels at their concerts and their successful chart run ending when the last two singles from Feuer und Flamme failed to chart.

The band's fourth and final studio album Eisbrecher ("Icebreaker"), apparently so named because it was intended to smash the mounting indifference the band was encountering, was released in late 1986. Relative to its three predecessors it was a commercial failure as were the two last singles released from the album. Without ever formally announcing a breakup, the band discontinued in 1987. In the same year the marriage of Nena's sister to the band's bassist Jürgen Dehmel ended in divorce and Nena's 8-year relationship with the band's drummer, Rolf Brendel, also ended.

=== Epilogue ===
After a break from the music scene during which she starred in the 1987 comedy film Der Unsichtbare and had a baby boy who died at the age of 11 months, Nena launched her solo career in 1989, going on to enjoy considerable success in Germany, Austria and Switzerland, particularly since 2002 when she re-recorded the band's biggest successes, newly arranged and produced by her former band colleague and composer of most of the band's hit songs, Uwe Fahrenkrog-Petersen. Since the birth of her fifth and final child in 1997, she has toured Germany more or less constantly; at least 50% of her concert setlists typically comprising tracks from the Nena band era.

Throughout her solo career, Nena has continued to collaborate with former band members. Firstly, Nena's former boyfriend, Rolf Brendel, supported her as a drummer in the Bongo Girl tour in 1993. Most enduring has been the link with the band's former keyboard player Uwe Fahrenkrog-Petersen who appeared with her on stage during the 2005 tour promoting the triple-gold achieving Willst du mit mir gehn album which he had also produced and co-written the singles for. He also collaborated with Nena for the 2009 album Made in Germany, which also achieved gold status. The band's former guitarist, Carlo Karges, also wrote tracks for some of Nena's solo albums in the 1990s. He died in 2002, just months before all the band's surviving members reunited on stage to perform "Leuchtturm" during Nena's triumphant Frankfurt concert which coincided with the release of the triple-platinum Nena feat. Nena album which regalvanised her solo career.

The surviving members next publicly reunited in 2017 to perform "Nur geträumt" in a television programme marking the 40th anniversary of Nena's first stage appearance.

== Members ==
- Gabriele Susanne Kerner (Nena) – lead vocals
- Carlo Karges (died 2002) – guitar, backing vocals
- Jürgen Dehmel – bass, Chapman Stick, keyboards, synthesizer
- Rolf Brendel – drums, percussion
- Uwe Fahrenkrog-Petersen – keyboards, synthesizers, keytar, backing and lead vocals

== Discography ==
=== Studio albums ===
Title	Album details	Peak chart positions						Certifications
Title	Album details	GER	AUT	NLD	NOR	SWE	SWI	Certifications
Nena	Released: 14 January 1983; Label: CBS Schallplatten GmbH; Formats: CD, cassette, LP	1	1	2	—	—	—	BVMI: Platinum; RIAJ: Platinum
?	Released: 27 January 1984; Label: CBS Schallplatten GmbH; Formats: CD, cassette, LP	1	1	2	17	11	1	BVMI: Platinum
Feuer und Flamme	Released: 24 June 1985; Label: CBS Schallplatten GmbH; Formats: CD, cassette, LP	2	16	19	—	—	5	BVMI: Gold
Eisbrecher	Released: 24 November 1986; Label: CBS Schallplatten GmbH; Formats: CD, LP	45	—	—	—	—	—	
"—" denotes a recording that did not chart or was not released in that territory

=== International albums ===
Following the international success of the single "99 Luftballons", the band released 99 Luftballons, a compilation of tracks from its first two albums, with five of the songs in new English-language versions. It's All in the Game is the English-language version of Feuer und Flamme, with lyrics by Canadian singer Lisa Dalbello.

Title	Album details	Peak chart positions					Certifications
Title	Album details	GER	NOR	SWE	UK	US	Certifications
99 Luftballons	Released: 8 April 1984; Label: CBS Schallplatten GmbH, Epic; Formats: CD, cassette, LP	23	16	2	31	27	MC: Gold
It's All in the Game	Released: 10 November 1985; Label: CBS Schallplatten GmbH, Epic; Formats: CD, LP	—	—	—	—	168	
"—" denotes a recording that did not chart or was not released in that territory

=== Singles ===
Title	Year	Peak chart positions										Certifications	Album	B-side
Title	Year	GER	AUT	BEL (FL)	CAN	NLD	NZL	SWE	SWI	UK	US	Certifications	Album	B-side
"Nur geträumt"	1982	2	9	11	—	7	—	—	5	—	—	BVMI: Gold	Nena	"Ganz oben"
"99 Luftballons"	1983	1	1	1	—	1	1	1	1	—	2	BVMI: Gold; RIAA: Gold	Nena	"Ich bleib' im Bett"
"Leuchtturm"	1983	2	3	—	—	7	—	—	—	—	—		Nena	"Kino"
"? (Fragezeichen)"	1983	3	4	19	—	12	—	—	1	—	—		?	"Ich lieb dich"
"99 Red Balloons"	1983	—	—	—	1	—	—	—	—	1	—	BPI: Gold; MC: Platinum	99 Luftballons	"Ich bleib im Bett"
"Rette mich"	1984	11	17	—	—	37	—	—	14	—	—		?	"Susi K."
"Lass mich dein Pirat sein"	1984	53	—	—	—	45	—	—	—	—	—		?	"Keine Antwort"
"Irgendwie, irgendwo, irgendwann"	1984	3	7	29	—	13	—	—	2	—	—		Feuer und Flamme	"Ganz Oben" (Live)
"Just a Dream"	1984	—	—	—	—	—	—	—	—	70	— (Note: "Just a Dream" did not enter the Billboard Hot 100, but peaked at number 2 on the Bubbling Under Hot 100 chart.)		99 Luftballons	"Indianer"
"? (Question Mark)"	1984	—	—	—	—	—	—	—	—	—	—		99 Luftballons	"Ich lieb dich"
"Kino (At the Movies)"	1984	—	—	—	—	—	—	—	—	—	—		99 Luftballons	"Kino"
"Feuer und Flamme"	1985	8	18	—	—	45	—	—	14	—	—		Feuer und Flamme	"Woman on Fire"
"Haus der drei Sonnen"	1985	43	—	—	—	47	—	—	—	—	—		Feuer und Flamme	"Ein Brief"
"Jung wie du"	1985	—	—	—	—	—	—	—	—	—	—		Feuer und Flamme	"Das alte Lied"
"It's All in the Game"	1985	—	—	—	—	—	—	—	—	—	—		It's All in the Game	"Let's Humanize"
"Du kennst die Liebe nicht"	1986	—	—	—	—	—	—	—	—	—	—		Feuer und Flamme	"Du kennst die Liebe nicht" (Live)
"Mondsong"	1986	37	—	—	—	70	—	—	—	—	—		Eisbrecher	"Schön wär es doch"
"Engel der Nacht"	1987	—	—	—	—	—	—	—	—	—	—		Eisbrecher	"Zusammen"
"—" denotes a recording that did not chart or was not released in that territory

=== Promotional singles ===
Title	Year	Album	B-side
"Kino"	1983	Nena	"Satellitenstadt"
