= Nena (album) =

Studio album by Nena
- Released: 14 January 1983
- Recorded: 1982
- Studio: Spliff Studio, West Berlin
- Genre: Neue Deutsche Welle, pop rock, new wave
- Length: 41:23
- Language: German
- Label: CBS
- Producer: Reinhold Heil, Manfred Praeker

Nena chronology
Nena (1983)	? (1984)

Singles from Nena
- 1. "Nur geträumt" Released: 1982; 2. "99 Luftballons" Released: 1983; 3. "Leuchtturm" Released: 1983

Professional ratings
Review scores
Source	Rating
AllMusic	4/5 stars

Nena is the first album by German pop rock band Nena and the second studio album of its singer, Gabriele "Nena" Kerner. Released on 14 January 1983, it is part of the music genre called Neue Deutsche Welle (meaning "New German Wave") in German music.

The album was a great success in West Germany and the second single "99 Luftballons" reached No. 1 in the music charts worldwide including Australia, Austria, Canada, the Irish Singles Chart, the Netherlands, New Zealand, Sweden, Switzerland and the United Kingdom Singles Chart. The single is considered a "one-hit wonder" by many in the US, despite the fact that the band's other singles repeatedly topped European charts. It was produced by Manfred Praeker and Reinhold Heil of the German band Spliff.

The album has been initially released as a vinyl LP, cassette and CD.

The first single from the album, "Nur geträumt", was released a year earlier, in 1982. "99 Luftballons" was the second single, released in 1983. The third and final single "Leuchtturm", was released in 1983, a few months after "99 Luftballons".

== Prominent tracks ==
The three singles released from the Nena album have enjoyed particular prominence in lead singer Nena's career. Although "99 Luftballons" is by far the most well known globally, the other two ("Nur geträumt" and "Leuchtturm") have for more than 30 years been ever-present features of the live concerts of firstly the band and then Nena in her subsequent solo career.

=== "Nur geträumt" ===
"Nur geträumt", the band's debut single, was released in May 1982, eight months before the release of the album. Upon release, the single sold poorly. However, after Nena performed it on the TV programme Musikladen in August 1982, it catapulted the band to fame in Germany. Written by Nena and her boyfriend Rolf Brendel, the band's drummer, it is about a couple longing to spend time together. It reached No. 2 in the German charts where it stayed for seven weeks from late October through early December 1982, being blocked from reaching No. 1 by F. R. David's "Words".

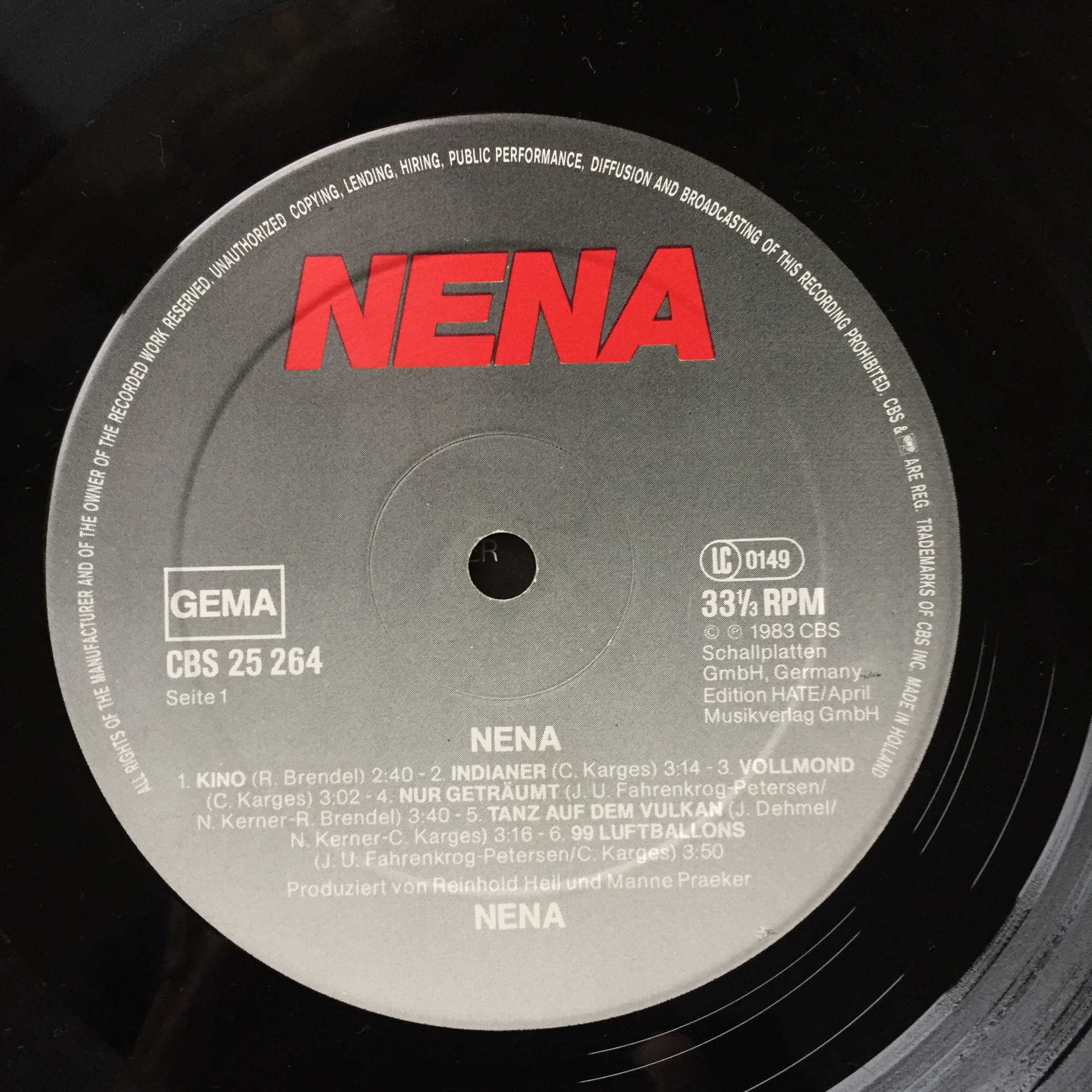
LP label of the "Nena" album

If the track was the one which launched Nena's career in Germany, where its release preceded "99 Luftballons", it had the opposite effect in the Anglophone world where an English version ("Just a Dream") failed as a follow-up, only scraping into the low reaches of the UK charts (No. 70).

In 2002, when Nena rekindled her solo career by releasing the triple platinum album Nena feat. Nena comprising re-worked versions of her 1980s greatest hits, "Nur geträumt" was among them. The album spawned three Top 10 hits in Germany but not the new version of "Nur geträumt", which only made No. 79. Given the huge success of the album, by 2010 Nena had reverted to performing the original versions of most of the album's songs, including "Nur geträumt".

=== "Leuchtturm" ===
"Leuchtturm" is a love song, its lyrics, written by Nena herself, describing how she and her "Kapitän" (captain) set off alone in a "U-Boot" (submarine) to see the world from a "Leuchtturm" (Lighthouse). They enjoy themselves so much that by the time the submarine surfaces, the lighthouse is no longer in view. Released as the follow-up to "99 Luftballons", it reached No. 2 in the German charts in 1983.

In 2001, a reggae-style version of "Leuchtturm" for Nena's solo album Chokmah proved to be the precursor of the following year's Nena feat. Nena album, which was made up of updates of her 1980s greatest hits. Another version of "Leuchtturm" appeared on this 2002 album, this makeover both more fundamental and more enduring. The tempo of the song quickened and the lyrics were overhauled. With all mentions of captains and "U-Boots" removed, the song's message became a more generic affirmation of loyalty ("I'll go with you wherever you want... I won't ever leave you"). The drift from the song's original meaning is best illustrated by the fact that the song's title "Leuchtturm" doesn't even appear in the new lyrics and the revised theme of unquestioning devotion led to it being adopted as a football chant by fans of Borussia Dortmund.

The changes worked: "Leuchtturm (2002)", as it was officially titled, returned to the Top 10 of the German charts 19 years after its first appearance, this time peaking at No. 7. Furthermore, despite the huge success of Nena feat. Nena, "Leuchtturm" is the only re-work from the album which Nena hasn't completely discarded in favour of the original version, instead during live concerts, the original version is first performed, then the 2002 version follows, which has been the case ever since.

In 2002 the single "Leuchtturm" was released with the additional title "Ich häng immer noch an dir" and with a remix by DJ Tomekk.

== Track listing ==
Side A contains tracks 1 to 6 and Side B contains tracks 7 to 12.

Vinyl LP, cassette and CD
No.	Title	Writer(s)	Length
1.	"Kino" (Cinema, aka At the Movies)	Rolf Brendel	2:42
2.	"Indianer" (Indians)	Carlo Karges	3:16
3.	"Vollmond" (Full Moon)	Karges	3:04
4.	"Nur geträumt" (Just dreamed, aka Just a Dream)	Jörn-Uwe Fahrenkrog-Petersen, Nena Kerner, Brendel	3:41
5.	"Tanz auf dem Vulkan" (Dance on the Volcano, aka Living on the Edge)	Karges, Jürgen Dehmel, Kerner	3:18
6.	"99 Luftballons" (99 Balloons, aka 99 Red Balloons)	Karges, Fahrenkrog	3:53
7.	"Zaubertrick" (Magic Trick)	Fahrenkrog, Brendel	4:15
8.	"Einmal ist keinmal" (Once is Not at All)	Manfred Praeker	2:45
9.	"Leuchtturm" (Lighthouse)	Fahrenkrog, Kerner	3:16
10.	"Ich bleib' im Bett" (I Stay in Bed)	Karges	2:42
11.	"Noch einmal" (Once Again)	Karges	3:56
12.	"Satellitenstadt" (Satellite Town)	Karges, Dehmel	4:31

== Personnel ==
Credits adapted from AllMusic and Discogs.

=== Nena ===
- Nena Kerner – lead vocals
- Jörn-Uwe Fahrenkrog-Petersen – keyboards
- Carlo Karges – guitars
- Jürgen Dehmel – bass guitar
- Rolf Brendel – drums

=== Technical personnel ===
- Udo Arndt – mixer
- Manfred "Manne" Praeker – production
- Reinhold Heil – production
- Imre Sereg – recorder
- Jim Rakete – cover design

== Charts ==
=== Weekly charts ===
Chart (1983–1984)	Peak position
Austrian Albums (Ö3 Austria)	1
Dutch Albums (Album Top 100)	2
German Albums (Offizielle Top 100)	1
UK Albums (OCC)	31

=== Year-end charts ===
Chart (1983)	Position
Austrian Albums (Ö3 Austria)	2
Dutch Albums (Album Top 100)	7
German Albums (Offizielle Top 100)	1

== Certifications and sales ==
Region	Certification	Certified units/sales
France (SNEP)	Gold	100,000^{*}
Germany (BVMI)	Platinum	500,000^{^}
Japan (RIAJ)	Platinum	200,000^{^}
Netherlands (NVPI)	Platinum	100,000^{^}
^{*} Sales figures based on certification alone.^{^} Shipments figures based on certification alone.

== Release history ==
Region	Year	Label	Format	Catalog
West Germany	1983	CBS	CD	CBS 25264
West Germany	1983	CBS	LP	CBS 25264
Netherlands	1983	CBS	LP	CBS 25264
Italy	1983	CBS	LP	CBS 25264
West Germany	1983	CBS	CD	CDCBS 32788
West Germany	1983	CBS	cassette	CBS 40–25264
West Germany	1983	CBS	cassette	CL 33030–8
West Germany	1983	CBS	LP	CBSCL 32098-6 (Club edition)
Spain	1983	CBS	LP	S 25 264
Japan	1983	Epic	LP	23-3P-488
Yugoslavia	1983	Suzy	LP	ULP 1436
Japan	1984	Epic/Sony	CD	35.8P-38
Yugoslavia	1984	CBS	LP	CBS 25264
Yugoslavia	1984	Suzy	LP	CBS 25264
West Germany	1989	CBS	CD	465388 2 (repress)
Germany	1998	Columbia	CD	491268 9
Germany	1998	Columbia	CD	491268 2 (reissue)
Brazil		Columbia	CD	721.052
Brazil		Sony	CD	2–465388
