= 99 Luftballons =

1983 single by Nena

"99 Luftballons/99 Red Balloons"

Single by Nena

from the album Nena and 99 Luftballons
- Language: German
- English title: "99 Red Balloons"
- Released: March 1983 (West Germany); 1984 (United Kingdom)
- Genre: Neue Deutsche Welle; synth-pop
- Length: 3:53
- Label: Epic
- Composer: Uwe Fahrenkrog-Petersen
- Lyricists: Carlo Karges (German lyrics); Kevin McAlea (English lyrics)
- Producers: Reinhold Heil; Manfred Praeker

Nena singles chronology
"Nur geträumt" (1982)	"99 Luftballons/99 Red Balloons" (1983)	"Leuchtturm" (1983)

Music videos
- "99 Luftballons" on YouTube; "99 Red Balloons" (English version) on YouTube

"99 Luftballons" (German: Neunundneunzig Luftballons, "99 balloons") is a song by the West German band Nena from their 1983 self-titled album. An English-language version titled "99 Red Balloons" (German: Neunundneunzig Rote Luftballons), with lyrics by Kevin McAlea, was also released by Nena on the album 99 Luftballons in 1984 after widespread success of the original in Europe and Japan. The English version is not a direct translation of the German original and contains lyrics with a somewhat different meaning. In the US, the English-language version did not chart, while the German-language recording became Nena's only US hit on the Billboard Hot 100.

== Background to lyrics ==
While at a June 1982 concert by the Rolling Stones in West Berlin, Nena's guitarist Carlo Karges noticed that balloons were being released. He watched them move toward the horizon, shifting and changing shapes like strange spacecraft (referred to in the German lyrics as a "UFO"). He thought about what might happen if they floated over the Berlin Wall to East Berlin.

Also cited by the band was a 1973 newspaper article from the Las Vegas Review-Journal about five high school students who played a prank to simulate a UFO by launching 99 (one was lost from the original 100) aluminized boPET balloons attached with ribbons to a traffic flare. The red flame from the flare reflected by the balloons gave the appearance of a large pulsating red object floating over Red Rock Canyon outside the Las Vegas Valley in Nevada.

A direct translation of the title is sometimes given as "Ninety-Nine Air Balloons", but the song became known in English as "Ninety-Nine Red Balloons". The phrase is repeated in the lyrics, and has the same meter as the German original.

The lyrics of the original German version tells a story: 99 balloons are mistaken for UFOs, causing a military general to send pilots to investigate. Finding nothing but balloons, the pilots put on a large show of firepower. The display of force worries the nations along the borders and the defence ministers on each side encourage conflict to grab power for themselves. In the end, a cataclysmic war results from the otherwise harmless flight of balloons and causes devastation on all sides without a victor, as indicated in the denouement of the song: "99 Jahre Krieg ließen keinen Platz für Sieger," which means "99 years of war left no room for victors." The anti-war song finishes with the singer walking through the devastated ruins of the world and finding a single balloon. The description of what happens in the final line of the piece is the same in German and English: "'Denk' an dich und lass' ihn fliegen," or "Think of you and let it go."

== English version and other re-recordings ==
The English version retains the spirit of the original narrative, but many of the lyrics are translated poetically rather than being directly translated: red helium balloons are casually released by the civilian singer (narrator) with her unnamed friend into the sky and are mistakenly registered by a faulty early warning system as enemy contacts, resulting in panic and eventually nuclear war, with the end of the song near-identical to the end of the original German version.

From the outset, Nena (the lead singer) and other members of the band expressed mild disapproval of the English version of the song, "99 Red Balloons". In March 1984, the band's keyboardist and song co-writer Uwe Fahrenkrog Petersen said, "We made a mistake there. I think the song loses something in translation and even sounds silly." In another interview that month, the band, including Nena herself, were quoted as being "not completely satisfied" with the English version, since it was "too blatant" for a group not wishing to be seen as a protest band.

Two re-recordings of the original German version of the song have been released by Nena the singer: a modern ballad version, which was included on Nena feat. Nena (2002), and a 2009 retro version, which originally aired as an animated video on the European Arte channel (as part of a special called "Summer of the '80s") and included some portions in French (specifically, the second part of the first verse and the entire final verse). Nena later formally released this rendition on her 2010 Best of Nena compilation, but the French text was omitted and replaced with the original German lyrics.

Live recordings of the song are included on all seven of Nena's live albums, dating from 1995 to 2018.

== Reception ==
American and Australian audiences preferred the original German version, which became a very successful non-English-language song, topping charts in both countries, reaching number one on the Cashbox chart, Kent Music Report, and number two on the Billboard Hot 100, behind "Jump" by Van Halen. It was certified gold by the RIAA. The later-released English translation, "99 Red Balloons", topped the charts in Canada and on the UK singles chart and Irish Singles Chart.

In his 2010 book Music: What Happened?, critic and musician Scott Miller declared that the song possesses "one of the best hooks of the '80s" and listed it among his top song picks for 1984. Nonetheless, he cautioned: "It must be admitted that this song suffers from an embarrassingly out-of-place disco funk interlude, and the word Kriegsminister."

== Use as a Cold War anthem ==
Both versions of the song have been used as Cold War protest songs. They were released at a time when the threat of nuclear war was imminent from the then-ongoing Cold War. Songs with Cold War connotations were not new. Music critic David Browne explains that "broader-ranging Cold War anxieties had wormed their way into rock 'n' roll years before most songwriters had heard the word 'Cambodia'". As a result, there were lots of Cold War protest songs that were released around this time, such as Sting's "Russians". The lyrics address the anxieties surrounding the threat of nuclear war, indicative of the unstable political climate at the time. While the song's narrative may seem absurd, they emphasize how easily the world could fall apart. In the ending of both versions, the world was left in ruin by what is assumed to be nuclear weapons.

While both versions are anti-war songs, they have differences in their meaning. In the original German version, a misunderstanding from surrounding countries causes the war that takes place in the song. An episode from the "Professor of Rock" podcast explains that the original German version is about a small issue turning into a major issue if it isn't dealt with quickly. This refers to a war starting over balloons being released into the sky. The podcast episode also shows that the English version, "99 Red Balloons", focuses more on political drama. This is evident from the lyrics, "Worry worry super scurry / Call the troops out in a hurry / This is what we've waited for / This is it boys, this is war". Whether or not this is true, "99 Luftballons" wasn't meant to be political. According to Nena, "99 Luftballons" is about being aware of our actions and promoting peace.

== Music video ==
The promotional video, which was originally made for the Dutch music programme TopPop and broadcast on 13 March 1983, was shot at Harskamp, a Dutch military training camp, with the band performing the song on a stage in front of a backdrop of fires and explosions provided by the Dutch Army. Towards the end of the video, the band are seen taking cover and abandoning the stage, which was unplanned and genuine since they believed the explosive blasts were getting out of control.

VH1 Classic, an American cable television station, ran a charity event for Hurricane Katrina relief in 2006. Viewers who made donations were allowed to choose which music videos the station would play. One viewer donated $35,000 for the right to program an entire hour and requested continuous play of "99 Luftballons" and "99 Red Balloons" videos. The station broadcast the videos as requested on 26 March 2006.

== Charts ==
=== German version ===
==== Weekly charts ====
Chart (1983–1984)	Peak position
Australia (Kent Music Report)	1
Austria (Ö3 Austria Top 40)	1
Belgium (Ultratop 50 Flanders)	1
Europe (Eurochart Hot 100)	1
Finland (Suomen virallinen lista)	5
Italy (Musica e dischi)	23
Japan (Oricon)	16
Netherlands (Dutch Top 40)	1
Netherlands (Single Top 100)	1
New Zealand (Recorded Music NZ)	1
Norway (VG-lista)	4
Peru (UPI)	1
Spain (AFYVE)	10
Sweden (Sverigetopplistan)	1
Switzerland (Schweizer Hitparade)	1
US Billboard Hot 100	2
US Billboard Dance Club Play	22
US Cash Box Top 100	1
West Germany (GfK)	1

==== Year-end charts ====
Chart (1983)	Rank
Austria (Ö3 Austria Top 40)	17
Belgium (Ultratop 50 Flanders)	27
Germany (Official German Charts)	2
Netherlands (Dutch Top 40)	14
Netherlands (Single Top 100)	5
Switzerland (Schweizer Hitparade)	6

Chart (1984)	Rank
Australia (Kent Music Report)	18
France (IFOP)	16
US Billboard Hot 100	28
US Cash Box Top 100	31

=== English version ===
==== Weekly charts ====
Chart (1984)	Peak position
Canada Top Singles (RPM)	1
Ireland (IRMA)	1
South Africa (Springbok Radio)	3
UK Singles Chart (OCC)	1
Zimbabwe (ZIMA)	1

==== Year-end charts ====
Chart (1984)	Rank
Canada Top Singles (RPM)	13
UK Singles (OCC)	15

=== 2002 re-release ===
Chart (2002)	Peak position
Belgium (Ultratip Bubbling Under Flanders)	17
Germany (GfK)	28
Netherlands (Single Top 100)	82
Switzerland (Schweizer Hitparade)	77

== Certifications ==
=== German version ===
Region	Certification	Certified units/sales
Denmark (IFPI Danmark)	Platinum	90,000^{‡}
France (SNEP)	Gold	500,000^{*}
Germany (BVMI)	Gold	500,000^{^}
Netherlands (NVPI)	Gold	100,000^{^}
New Zealand (RMNZ)	Platinum	30,000^{‡}
United States (RIAA)	Gold	1,000,000^{^}
^{*} Sales figures based on certification alone.^{^} Shipments figures based on certification alone.^{‡} Sales+streaming figures based on certification alone.

=== English version ===
Region	Certification	Certified units/sales
Canada (Music Canada)	Platinum	100,000^{^}
United Kingdom (BPI)	Platinum	600,000^{‡}
^{^} Shipments figures based on certification alone.^{‡} Sales+streaming figures based on certification alone.

== Goldfinger version ==
"99 Red Balloons"

Single by Goldfinger

from the album Stomping Ground
- Language: English/German
- Released: 2000
- Genre: Pop-punk
- Length: 3:49
- Label: Jive; Mojo
- Composer: Uwe Fahrenkrog-Petersen
- Lyricists: Carlo Karges (German lyrics); Kevin McAlea (English lyrics)
- Producers: John Feldmann; Tim Palmer; Jay Rifkin

Goldfinger singles chronology
"My Head" (1997)	"99 Red Balloons" (2000)	"Counting The Days" (2000)

Music video
- "99 Red Balloons" on YouTube

Many artists have covered both versions of the song. One of the more successful was the American rock band Goldfinger's 2000 release of "99 Red Balloons" as the first single from their Stomping Ground album. Most verses are performed in English except for the fourth, which is sung in German. At the end, the lead singer John Feldmann quietly says, "Good night, children everywhere."

In 2022, for the deluxe edition of their album Never Look Back, Goldfinger rerecorded the song with Travis Barker on drums.

Goldfinger's take has also been featured in several feature films, including Not Another Teen Movie (2001), EuroTrip (2004) and Sonic the Hedgehog 3 (2024).

=== Personnel ===
- John Feldmann – vocals, guitar
- Charlie Paulson – guitar
- Dangerous Darrin Pfeiffer – drums
- Kelly LeMieux – bass

=== Certifications ===
Region	Certification	Certified units/sales
United States (RIAA)	Gold	500,000^{‡}
^{‡} Sales+streaming figures based on certification alone.

== See also ==
- List of anti-war songs
- List of Billboard Hot 100 top-ten singles in 1984
- List of Cash Box Top 100 number-one singles of 1984
- List of Dutch Top 40 number-one singles of 1983
- List of European number-one hits of 1983
- List of number-one hits of 1983 (Germany)
- List of number-one singles and albums in Sweden
- List of number-one singles from the 1980s (New Zealand)
- List of number-one singles in Australia during the 1980s
- List of number-one singles of 1984 (Canada)
- List of number-one singles of 1984 (Ireland)
- List of number-one singles of the 1980s (Switzerland)
- List of one-hit wonders in the United States
- List of UK singles chart number ones of the 1980s
- Lists of number-one singles (Austria)
