= Uwe Fahrenkrog-Petersen =

German musician and producer

- Born: Jörn-Uwe Fahrenkrog-Petersen; 10 March 1960 (age 66); West Berlin, West Germany
- Genres: Neue Deutsche Welle, pop, rock
- Occupations: Musician, songwriter, music producer
- Instrument: Keyboards
- Years active: 1974–present
- Labels: CBS, BMI, Dsign

Jörn-Uwe Fahrenkrog-Petersen (born 10 March 1960) is a German keyboard player, producer and composer. He was the keyboardist of the band Nena and co-wrote their hit "99 Luftballons" as well as another great hit entitled "Irgendwie, irgendwo, irgendwann" (German for somehow, somewhere, sometime).

== Career ==
In 2011, Fahrenkrog-Petersen joined forces with former Modern Talking lead singer Thomas Anders as a dance-pop duo Anders/Fahrenkrog. The two released their first single "Gigolo" on 27 May 2011, followed by the album "Two" on 10 June. The album peaked at No. 11 in the German album charts.
