= Juice (German magazine) =

German hip hop magazine

- Dilated Peoples on the April 2004 issue of Juice
- Categories: Hip hop music magazine
- Circulation: about 80.000
- Publisher: Piranha Media GmbH
- Founded: 1997
- Final issue: November 2019 (print)
- Based in: Munich
- Language: German
- Website: juice.de

Juice is a German online hip hop magazine and the biggest of its kind in Europe. It was a print publication between 1997 and November 2019. Then it began to be an online magazine. In every issue, readers find interviews with rappers and record reviews. The editors pick an 'album of the month' and, additional to the normal reviews, Juice features a 'battle of the ear': If the editorial staff's opinions about a record diverge strongly, it is reviewed by two different editors, each defending their point of view. In the magazine, records are rated with crowns on a scale from one to six.

Juice was published 11 times per year by Piranha Media until November 2019. In the first quarter of 2007, 28,757 copies were sold.

Other rubrics include the "All Time Classic", a two-page report about rappers or groups that have influenced hip hop culture or have released albums that are considered classics by today's standards. Featured artists include Tuff Crew, Coldcut, the WhoRidas, Newcleus, Kenny 'Dope' Gonzales, Hijack, X-Clan and K-Rino

Since 2005, both rappers and producers are asked to rate beats in a section called "...vs. the Beats". Featured performers are, among others: Amp Fiddler, Kano, the Saïan Supa Crew, St Laz New Industry Records, DJ Fade and Five Deez.

The magazine includes a sampler with 15 tracks, sometimes tracks only released on the Juice sampler.

== Issues ==
Issue	Cover	Album of the Month
December 2008	Akon & T-Pain	Statik Selektah – Stick 2 The Script
November 2008	Ludacris	Termanology – Politics As Usual
October 2008	Bushido	Curse – Freiheit
September 2008	Kool Savas	Madlib – WLIB AM: King Of The Wigflip
August 2008	The Game	The Cool Kids – The Bake Sale
July 2008	Busta Rhymes	Lil Wayne – Tha Carter III
June 2008	Chakuza	The Roots - Rising Down
May 2008	Lil' Wayne	Gnarls Barkley - The Odd Couple
April 2008	Pete Rock	Pete Rock - NY's Finest
March 2008	Gewalt und Rap	Guilty Simpson - Ode to the Ghetto
January/February 2008	Dynamite Deluxe	Freeway - Free at last
December 2007	Jay-Z	Trae - Life Goes On
November 2007	Wu-Tang Clan	Kool Savas - Tot oder Lebendig
October 2007	Bushido	Kanye West - Graduation
September 2007	50 Cent	Common - Finding Forever
August 2007	Common	K.I.Z - Hahnenkampf
July 2007	T.I.	Olli Banjo - Lifeshow
June 2007	Olli Banjo / Snaga & Pillath	Wiley - Playtime ist over
May 2007	UGK	Devin the Dude - Waiting to inhale
April 2007	Prinz Pi	Various Artists - Hyphy Hitz
March 2007	Prodigy und The Alchemist	Nas - Hip Hop Is Dead
January/February 2007	Clipse	Clipse - Hell hath no fury (6 Kronen)
December 2006	Sido	The Game - The Doctor's Advocate
November 2006	The Game	A.G. - Get Dirty Radio
October 2006	Kool Savas	Nicolay - Here
September 2006	Bushido	Rick Ross - Port of Miami
August 2006	Outkast	Rhymefest - Blue Collar
July 2006	Jan Delay	Busta Rhymes - The Big Bang (6 Kronen)
June 2006	Ghostface Killah	Azad - Game Over
May 2006	Busta Rhymes	T.I. - King
April 2006	Azad	Ghostface Killah - Fishscale
March 2006	Young Jeezy	Diverse - The Celluloid Years
January/February 2006	Lil' Wayne / Juelz Santana	Juelz Santana - What the game's been missing
December 2005	G-Unit	Bun B - Trill
November 2005	Pharrell	Deine Lieblings Rapper - Dein Lieblings Album
October 2005	Little Brother + Danger Mouse & MF Doom	Kanye West - Late Registration
September 2005	Kanye West	Slim Thug - Already Platinum
August 2005	Samy Deluxe	Buckshot & 9th Wonder - Chemistry
July 2005	Missy Elliott	Sean Price - Monkey Barz
June 2005	Deine Lieblings Rapper	Common - Be
May 2005	Rap auf dem Index	Beanie Sigel - The B. coming
April 2005	The Game	Quasimoto - The Further Adventures of Lord Quas
March 2005	50 Cent	The Game - The Documentary
January/February 2005	Roots Manuva	Snoop Dogg - R&G: The Masterpiece / Roots Manuva - Awfully Deep
December 2004	Lil Jon	R.A. the Rugged Man - Die, Rugged Man, Die
November 2004	Bushido	Mos Def - The New Danger
October 2004	Talib Kweli	Dizzee Rascal - Showtime
September 2004	Cam'Ron	Samy Deluxe - Verdammtnochma
August 2004	Kanye West	The Roots - The Tipping Point
July 2004	M.O.P.	Erick Sermon - Chilltown, New York
June 2004	Nas	Ghostface Killah - The Pretty Toney Album
May 2004	Sido (rapper)	Diverse - Definitive Jux Presents III
April 2004	Dilated Peoples	Kanye West - The College Dropout
March 2004	Melbeatz & Kool Savas	Twista - Kamikaze
January/February 2004	Jay-Z	Jay-Z - The Black Album / Tragedy Khadafi - Still Reportin…
December 2003	DMX	Soul Position - 8 Million Stories
November 2003	Biz Markie	Obie Trice - Cheers
October 2003	Ludacris	TY - Upwards
September 2003	Outkast	Beginner - Blast Action Heroes
August 2003	Pharrell	Dudley Perkins - A Lil' Night
July 2003	Beginner	Madlib - Shades of Blue: Madlib Invades Blue Note
June 2003	Nate Dogg	Prince Paul - Politics Of The Business
May 2003	Gang Starr	Azad - Faust Des Nordwestens
April 2003	50 Cent	DJ Hype - 1973 * Recon
March 2003	ASD (Afrob & Samy Deluxe)	Nas - God's Son
January/February 2003	The Roots	Talib Kweli - Quality / DJ Spinna - Here To There
December 2002	Jay-Z	
November 2002	Jurassic 5	
October 2002	Kool Savas	
September 2002	Xzibit	
August 2002	Style Issue	
July 2002	Eminem	
June 2002	Deutschrap Strikes Back!	
May 2002	Def Jux	
April 2002	Fat Joe	
March 2002	Grandmaster Flash	
January/February 2002	Mobb Deep	
December 2001	Saian Supa Crew	
November 2001	Tupac Shakur	
October 2001	Curse	
September 2001	Pharoahe Monch & Rawkus	
July/August 2001	RZA	
June 2001	RAG	
May 2001	KRS-One	
April 2001	Jan Delay & Denyo 77	
March 2001	Run DMC	
January/February 2001	Kopfnicker	
December 2000	Outkast	
November 2000	Wu Tang Clan	
October 2000	The Black Eyed Peas	
September 2000	De La Soul	
July/August 2000	Busta Rhymes	
June 2000	Spax & DJ Mirko	
May 2000	Moses Pelham & Cora E	
April 2000	Tony Touch	
March 2000	Big Punisher	
January/February 2000	Dr. Dre	
December 1999	Method Man & Redman	
November 1999	Ferris MC	
October 1999	Ol' Dirty Bastard	
September 1999	Noreaga	
July/August 1999	Missy Elliott	
May 1999	Freundeskreis / Eminem	
April 1999	Nas	
March 1999	Foxy Brown	
January/February 1999	Jay-Z	
November/December 1998	RZA	
September/October 1998	Snoop Dogg	
July/August 1998	Big Punisher	
May/June 1998	Deutschrap	
March/April 1998	Run DMC	
January/February 1998	Gang Starr	
November/December 1997	Busta Rhymes	
