= Beginner (band) =

German hip hop group

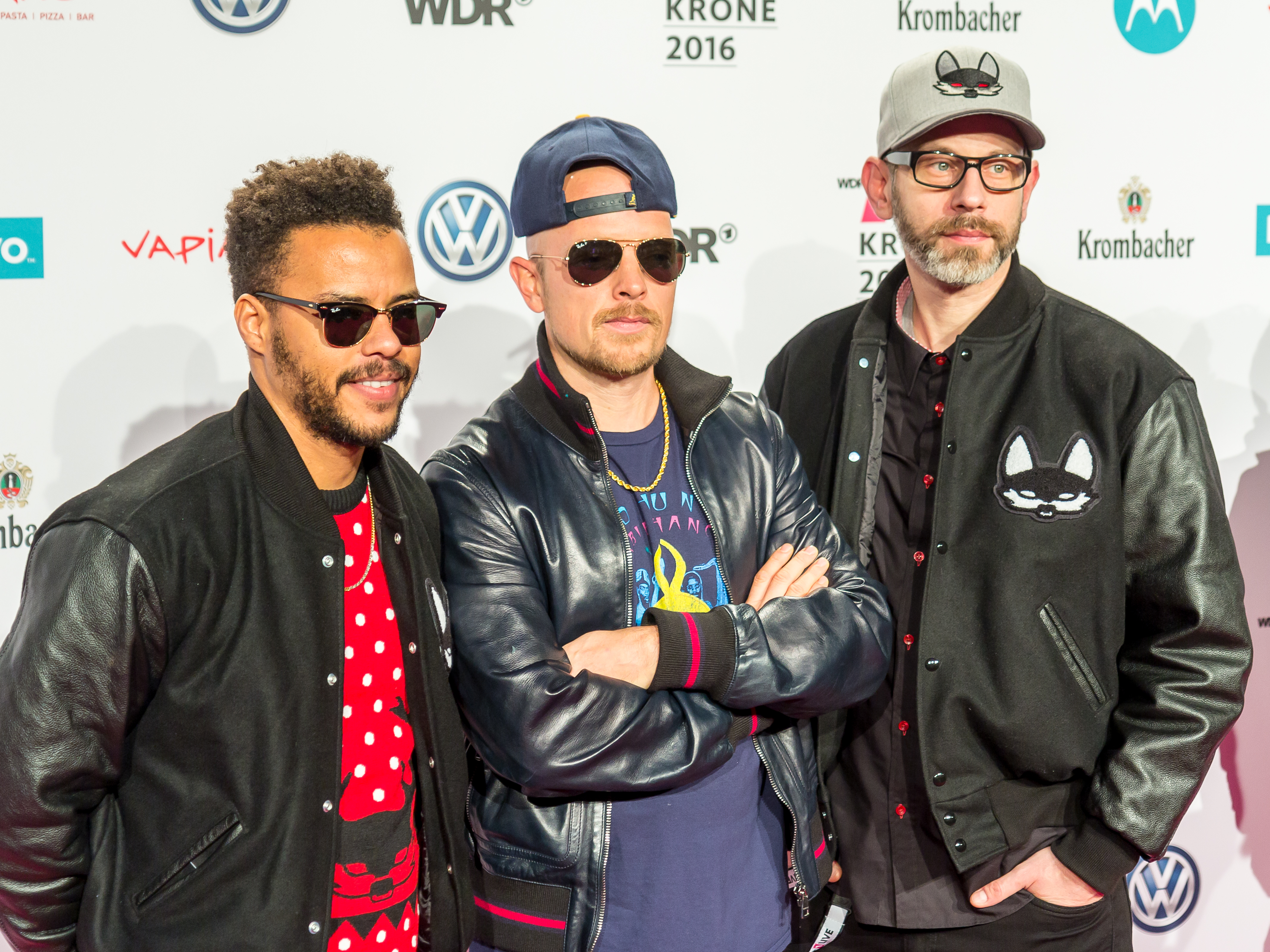

Background information
- Also known as: Absolute Beginner
- Origin: Hamburg, Germany
- Genres: German hip hop
- Years active: 1992–present
- Labels: Buback, Universal
- Members: Jan Delay (a.k.a. Eizi Eiz/Eißfeldt); Denyo; DJ Mad
- Past members: DJ Burn; Nabil; Mirko; Platin Martin
- Website: beginner.de

Beginner (formerly Absolute Beginner (Note: Note that the adjective's form denotes that the German name is plural; sing. "absoluter".)) is a German rap group from Hamburg, consisting of Jan Delay (a.k.a. Eizi Eiz/Eißfeldt), Denyo and DJ Mad. Their fourth album, Advanced Chemistry, was released in August 2016.

== Band history ==
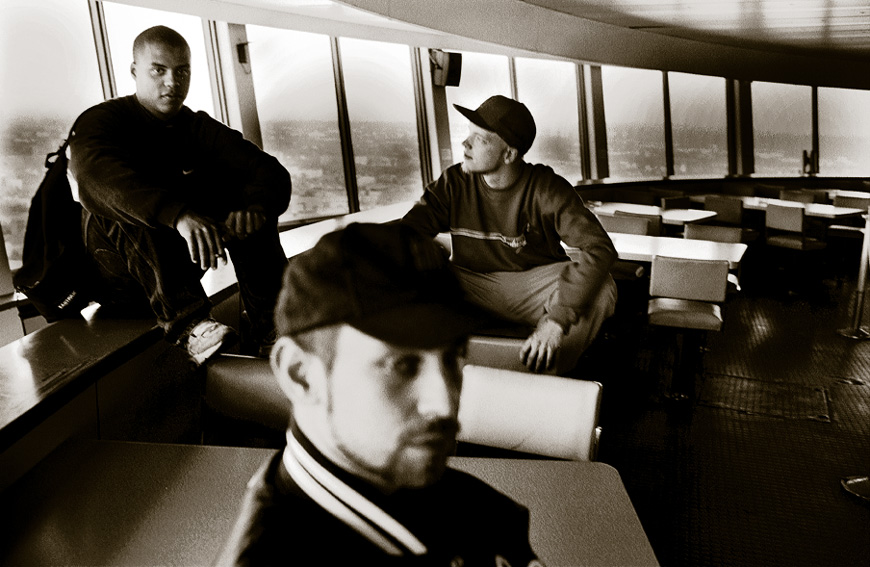
The group in 1998

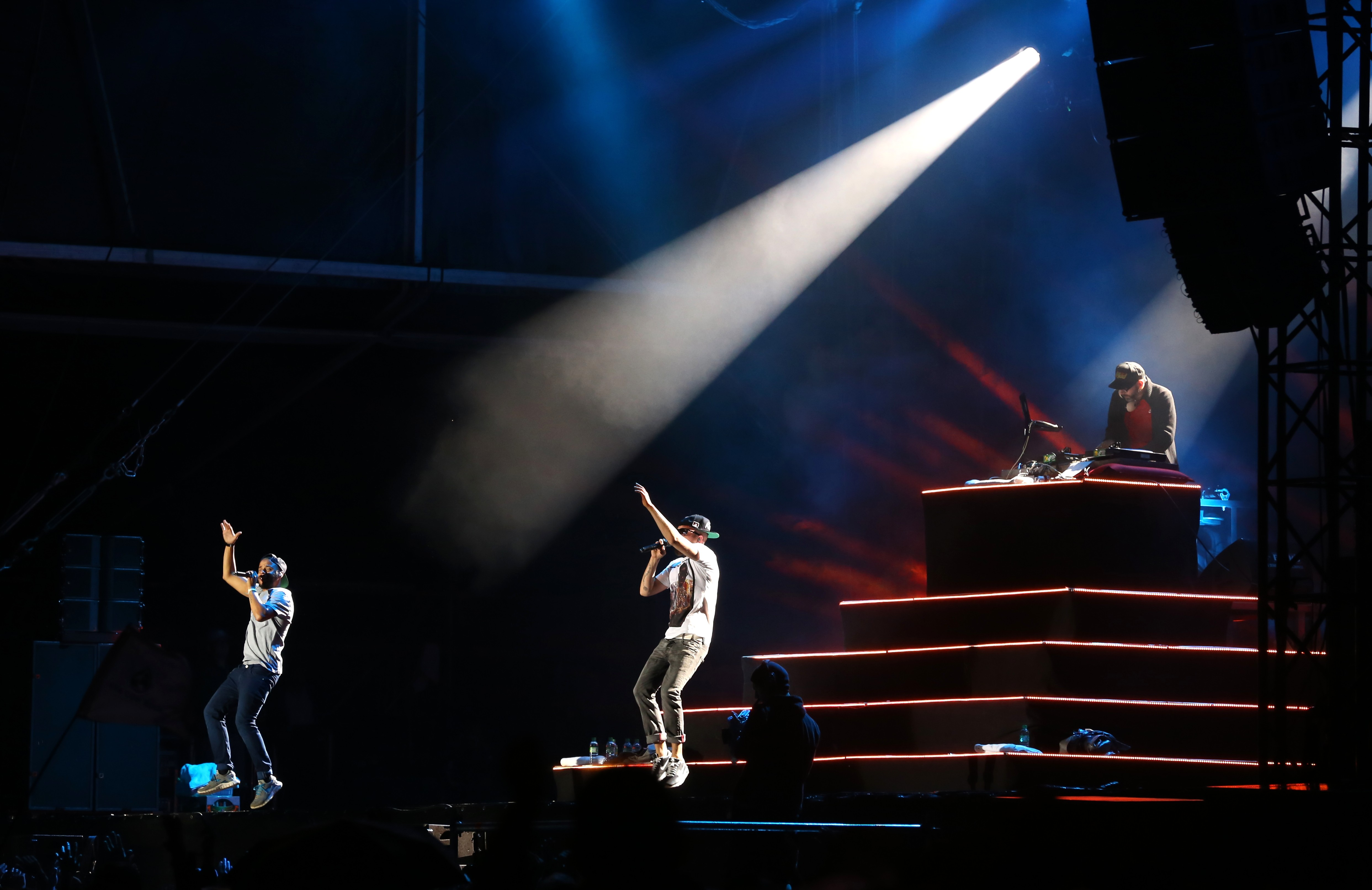
Beginner in 2013

The group was founded as Absolute Beginner in 1991, initially with six members: Jan Delay, Denyo, Mardin, DJ Burn, Nabil, Mirko, but the latter three dropped out after a few months. They started rapping in English and German with homemade beats, but later chose to rap solely in German. During their first public appearance they met DJ Mad, who immediately joined the group.

In 1993, they released their first track, "K.E.I.N.E." on the sampler Kill the Nation With a Groove. The same year they released their first EP, Gotting, and embarked on their first tour.

Their first proper album Flashnizm was released in 1996, to a fairly moderate commercial success. Nevertheless, they produced a video for the single "Natural Born Chillaz", which MTV refused to play, and went on tour throughout the German-speaking countries to smaller crowds. Mardin became dissatisfied with the band's progress and left in 1997. That same year Eißfeldt founded the Underground tape label Eimsbush, references to which are interspersed in many German hip hop tracks. Eimsbush records later developed into a full-fledged independent label, producing new acts like D-Flame and Illo77, but closed down in 2003.

In 1998, they had a Top 10 hit with "Liebes Lied" ("Dear Song", a pun on the word for love song, Liebeslied). Their album Bambule entered the top 30 of the albums chart and they released the follow-up singles "Hammerhart" ("Hammer Hard") and "Füchse" ("Foxes"), which featured Samy Deluxe. They went on three tours with Dynamite Deluxe, Main Concept and the Beastie Boys respectively and appeared at major festivals. In 2001 the Beginners released a remix album of Bambule, called Boombule.

In 1999, Eißfeldt released his first solo reggae single, a cover version of new wave idol Nena's "Irgendwo, Irgendwie, Irgendwann". In 2001, he then released a solo reggae album, Searching for the Jan Soul Rebels. Denyo also went solo and released his album Minidisko 2001, while DJ Mad produced for other major acts and hosted a weekly radio show. They did not split, however, with Denyo and Eißfeldt going on the 60 Hz-tour together, along with Eimsbush-act D-Flame.

In 2002, after the German hip hop hype had abated, Mad, Eißfeldt and Denyo agreed to record an album together again, which became their 2003 hit album Blast Action Heroes, heralded by the Top 10 single "Fäule". It rose to first place on the German albums chart, countering the downwards trend of non-mainstream music styles, which had been brought about by a number of changes in the music industry and Germany's media landscape. Their 2003 Blast Action Heroes tour eventuated into a second leg in 2004. The first Beginner DVD was released in December 2004. After Blast Action Heroes reached number one on the German chart, they released "Danke", a song thanking their fans for their support.

On 24 May 2016, group member Jan Delay announced that a new album titled Advanced Chemistry would be released on 26 August 2016. The group's first single in 13 years, "Ahnma" (featuring Gzuz & Gentleman), was released in June 2016.

== Music ==
The Beginners started out with highly politicized lyrics. Their first song "K.E.I.N.E." attacked the German police force. Their lyrics often mix comedy and politics. Indeed, a lot of the early satire of their lyrics abated in their first commercially successful album Bambule, especially in the singles released, and some rival acts accused them of selling out. However, Eißfeldt's reggae album has political lyrics throughout and Denyo has been engaged in the anti-racism hip hop project Brothers Keepers and Blast Action Heroes is also a thoroughly politicized album.

After a long break, the Beginners returned with a more progressive and experimental sound, turning away from their "old school" hip hop sound.

== Aliases ==
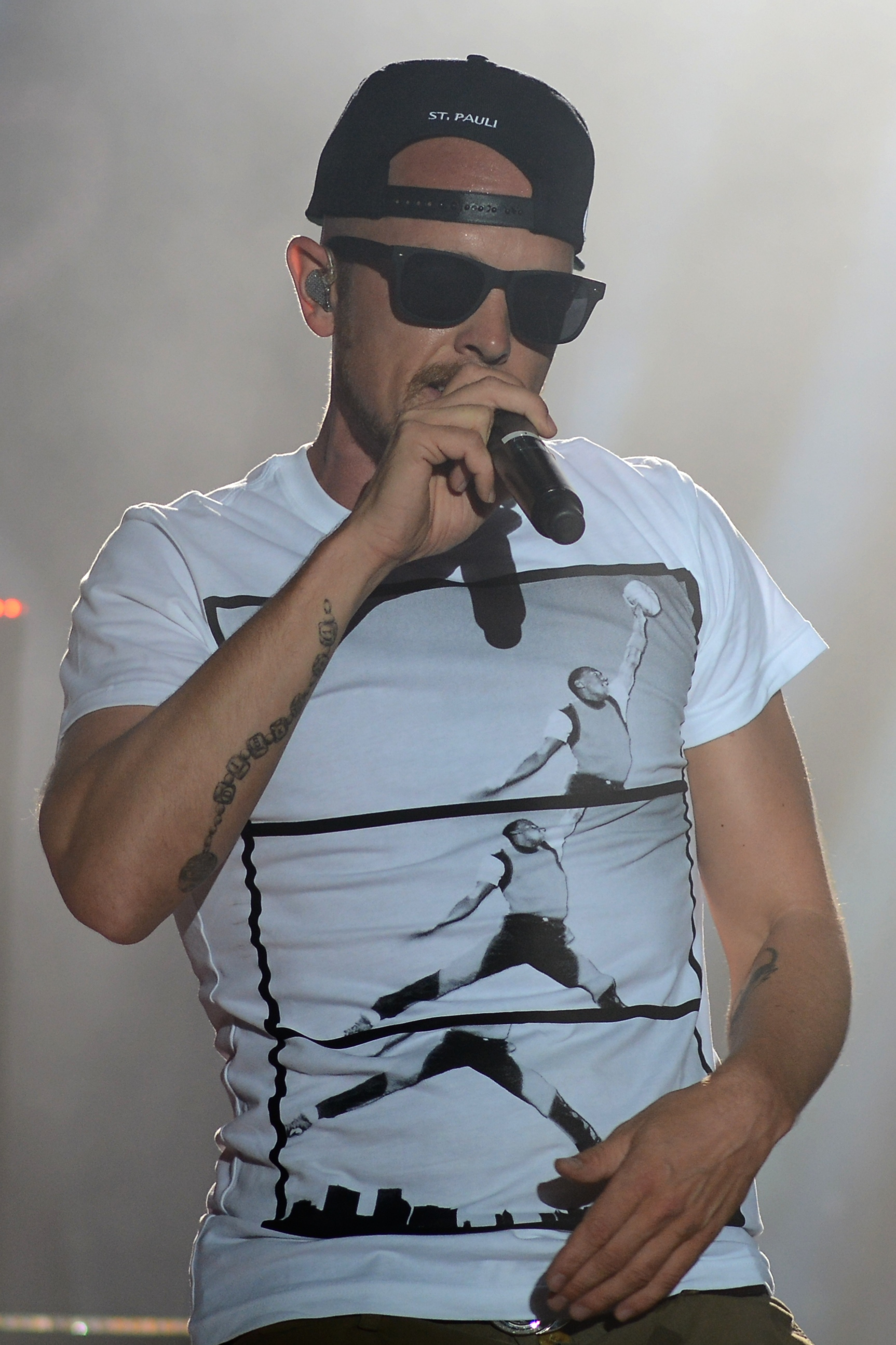
Jan Delay

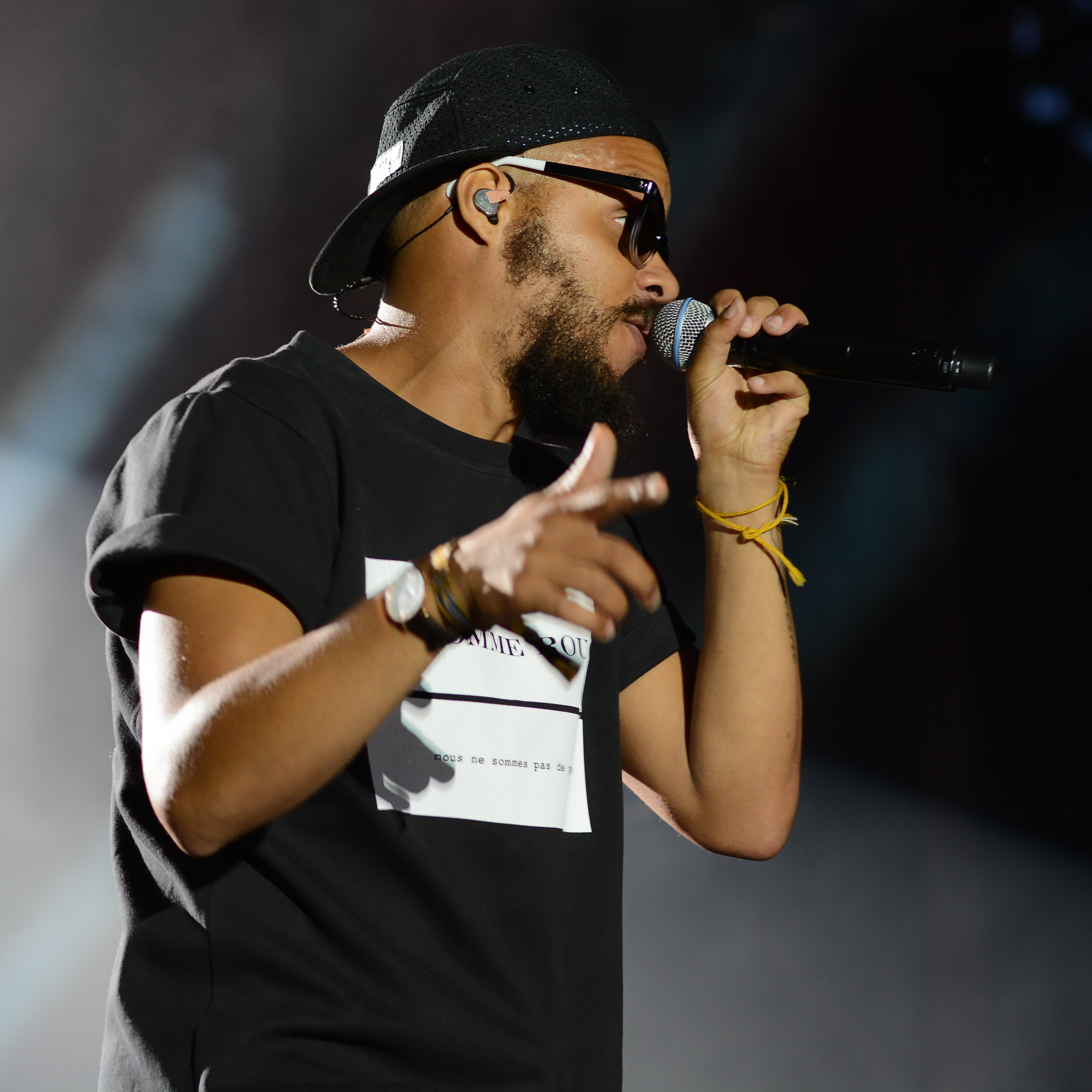
Denyo

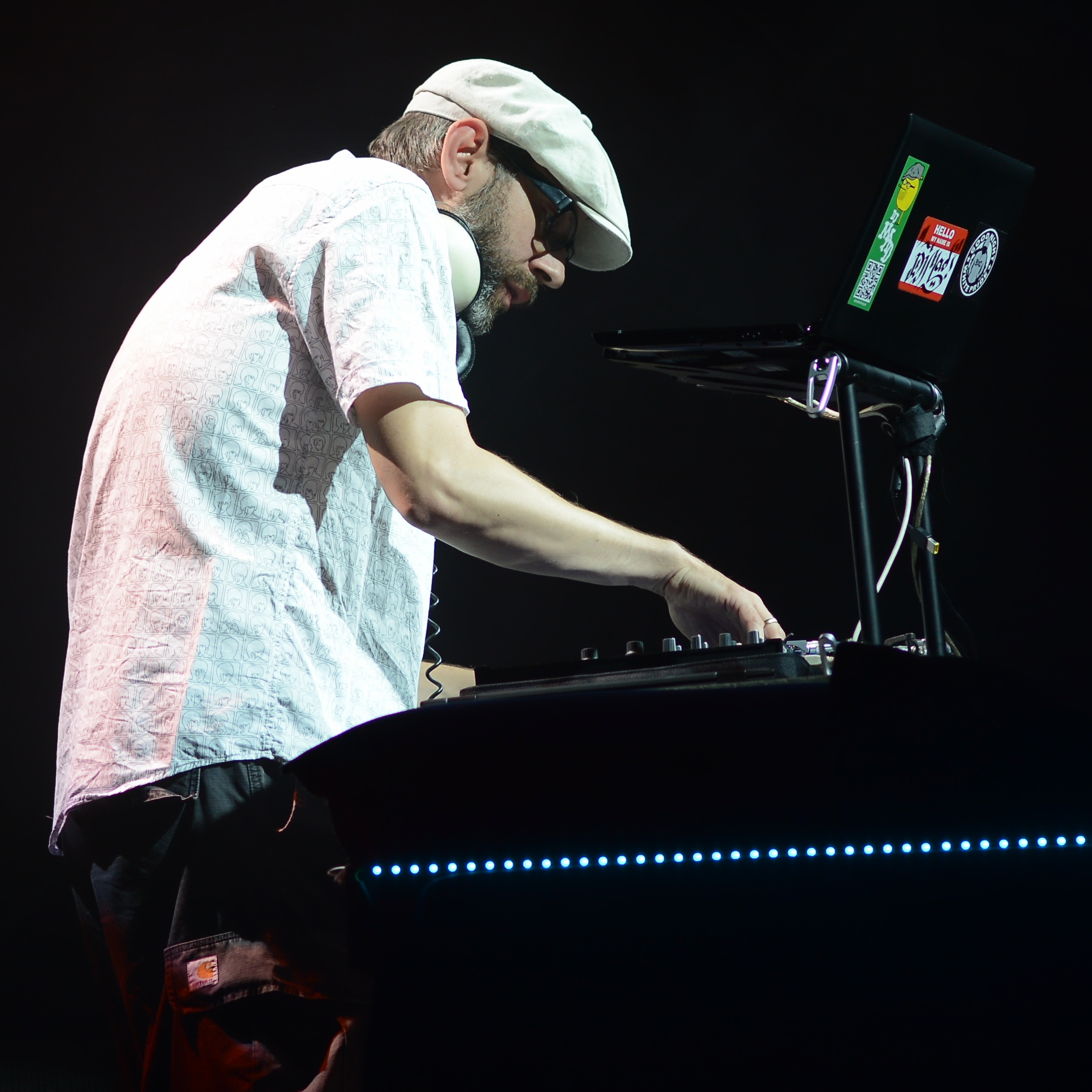
DJ Mad

Jan Eißfeldt is also known as Eisfeldt65, Jan Delay (his reggae and funk name), Boba Ffett (his Style-Liga name) and Eizi Eiz (originally a character – a pretentious young rapper – in a duet with D-Flame, now his current stage name).

Denyo is also known as Denyo77, Denyo Deutschland and, simply, Dennis.

== Discography ==
- 1993: Song "K.E.I.N.E." on the sampler Kill the Nation with a Groove (LP/CD, Buback Tonträger)
- 1993: Gotting (EP/CD, Buback)
- 1995: Die Kritik an den Platten kann die Platte der Kritik nicht ersetzen (12"/CD single, Buback)
- 1996: Natural Born Chillas (12"/CD single, Buback)
- 1996: Flashnizm [Stylopath] (LP/CD, Buback)
- 1998: Rock On (12"/CD single, Buback/Universal Records)
- 1998: Bambule (LP/CD, Buback/Universal)
- 1998: Liebes Lied (12"/CD single, Buback/Universal)
- 1999: Hammerhart (12"/CD single, Buback/Universal)
- 1999: Füchse/K2 (12"/CD single, Buback/Universal)
- 2000: Boombule – Bambule Remixed (Remix LP/CD, Buback/Motor)
- 2003: Blast Action Heroes (LP/CD, Buback/Motor)
- 2016: Ahnma (featuring Gzuz and Gentleman) (Single)
- 2016: Advanced Chemistry (LP/CD, Vertigo/Universal)
- + solo projects and features
