= Ali B op volle toeren =

Dutch television programme

Ali B op volle toeren (literally "Ali B at full speed"), abbreviated as ABOVT, is a Dutch television programme hosted by Moroccan-Dutch rapper Ali B for broadcaster AVROTROS (previously TROS). The name refers to Op volle toeren, an earlier very popular Dutch music program broadcast on TROS in the 1970s and 1980s. The programme initially aired between January 2011 and December 2016. In October 2020 ABOVT announced its return after a four-year-absence

== Format ==
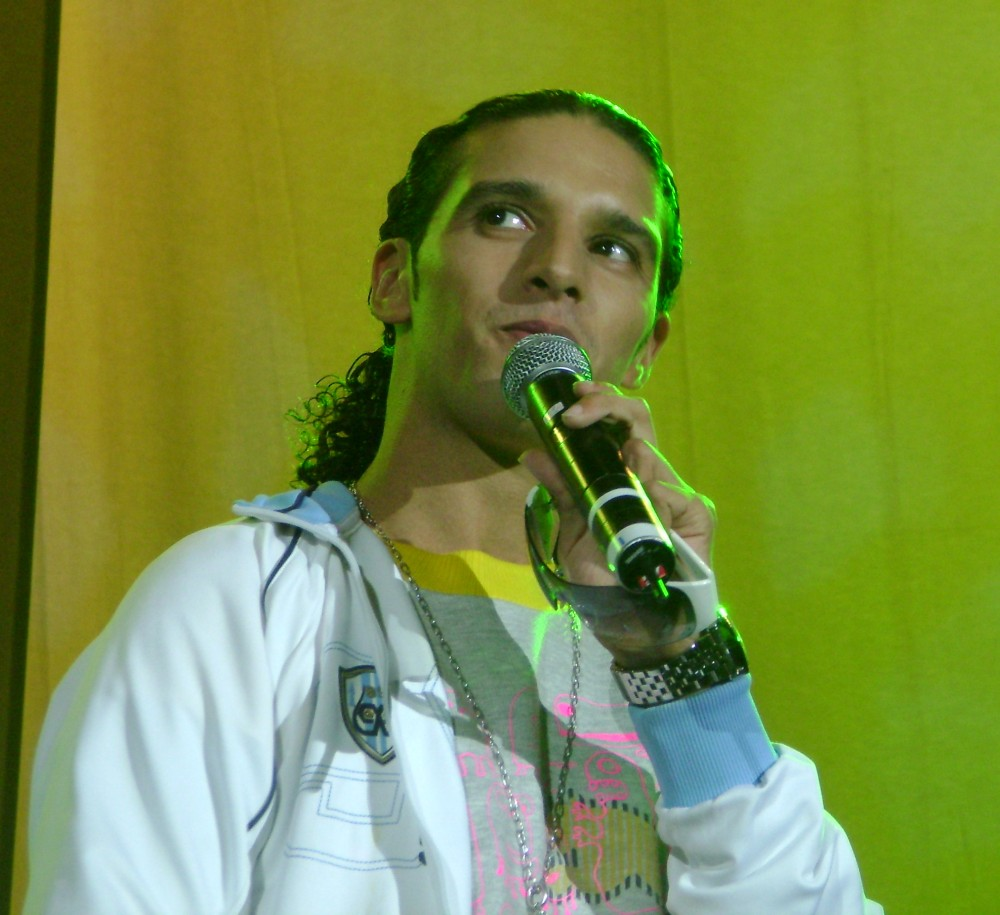
Ali B, the host of Ali B op volle toeren

In each broadcast, Ali B couples with a fellow singer artist that changes in each episode. Usually each season is made up of 8 episodes. The guest artist chooses from his or her repertoire one of his own earlier hits, for the purpose of making a contemporary hip hop / urban "remake" / or cover version of the song by another invitee artist, usually a rapper / hip hop artist and vice versa.

Partaking artists are encouraged to use their own style giving the hit a real new twist. At the end of each episode, the artists would get together with Ali B to perform the new interpretations. Ali B often ends up participating in parts of the renditions, and so does falsetto-voiced producer Brownie Dutch. The artists would exchange opinions about the new revived versions of each other. The format has proved to be able to create crossover hits between traditional Dutch songs and urban hip hop music. Some of the interpretations have appeared on the Dutch Single Top 100 and Dutch Top 40 as hits in their own right.

== Franchise ==
The format of ABOVT has been sold to eight countries, including Belgium, Germany, Portugal, Ukraine and Switzerland. Cover My Song, was the series broadcast on German VOX channel hosted by German hip hop artist Dennis Lisk also known by his stage name Denyo. In addition, a Tuvalu producer launched a truly international variant called Cover Me in which artists from different countries came together to cover each other's hits. In the autumn of 2012, the a Flemish version, named In De Mix (literally In the mix) was launched with Brahim Attaeb (or simply Brahim) as host.

The various series titles include:

Country	Local name	Host	Network	Air Date	Series completed
Belgium	In de mix	Brahim	Eén	Season 1 (2012)	1
Germany	Cover My Song	Dennis Lisk	VOX	Season 1 (2011)	1
Netherlands	Ali B op volle toeren	Ali B	TROS	Season 1 (2011); Season 2 (2011-2012); Season 3 (2012-2013); Season 4 (2015); Season 5 (2016)	4

== Seasons ==
=== Season 1 ===
Episode #	Date of broadcast	Artist	Chosen hit	Remake song	Chart position of remake (if applicable)
1	5 January 2011	Lenny Kuhr	"De troubadour"	"Spijt"	
1	5 January 2011	Keizer	"Mama Sorry"	"De troubadour 2011"	#50 (Single Top 100)
2	12 January 2011	Ben Cramer	"De clown"	"Hé man"	
2	12 January 2011	Fresku	"Twijfel"	"De clown 2011"	
3	19 January 2011	Willeke Alberti	"Telkens weer"	"Luister meisje"	
3	19 January 2011	Kleine Viezerik	"Meisje luister"	"Telkens weer 2011"	
4	26 January 2011	Stef Bos	"Papa"	"Dingen gedaan 2011"	
4	26 January 2011	Negativ	"Dingen gedaan"	"Vaders"	
5	2 February 2011	Bonnie St. Claire	"Bonnie kom je buiten spelen"	"Eeyeeyo 2011"	
5	2 February 2011	Darryl	"Eeyeeyo"	"Bonnie"	
6	9 February 2011	Dennie Christian	"Rosamunde"	"Ik ben niet meer van jou"	#12 (Single Top 100)
6	9 February 2011	Yes-R	"Uit elkaar"	"Rosamunde 2011"	#38 (Dutch Top 40) #7 (Single Top 100)
7	2 March 2011	Anneke Grönloh	"Brandend zand"	"Obsessie 2011"	
7	2 March 2011	Gio	"Obsessie"	"Brandend hart"	
8	9 March 2011	Henny Vrienten	"Sinds een dag of twee (32 jaar)"	"32 jaar later"	
8	9 March 2011	Winne	"Lotgenoot"	"'t Is voorbij"	
N/a	16 March 2011	Compilation episode			

=== Season 2 ===
Due to huge popularity, the program returned for a second season. Also to create further interest, in season 2, and after the broadcast of each episode of the season, the website Sterren.nl would post a video of the hip hop song from the show. The clips were prepared by Teemong.

Episode #	Date of broadcast	Artist	Chosen hit	Remake song
1	14 December 2011	Armand	"Ben ik te min"	"Straattaal 2011"
1	14 December 2011	Nina	"Straattaal"	"Ben ik te min 2011"
2	21 December 2011	Corry Konings	"Huilen is voor jou te laat"	"Zoveel stress 2011"
2	21 December 2011	Kempi	"Zoveel stress"	"Maar is huilen nu voor mij te laat?"
3	28 December 2011	Rob de Nijs	"Het werd zomer"	"Luie rappers"
3	28 December 2011	Hef	"Luie mannen"	"Hoe kan ik"
4	4 January 2012	Imca Marina	"Viva España"	"Leef dat feest elke dag"
4	4 January 2012	Brace	"Vraag jezelf eens af"	"Viva la vida"
5	11 January 2012	George Baker	"Una paloma blanca"	"Tijdmachine 2012"
5	11 January 2012	Dio	"Tijdmachine"	"Una Paloma Blanca 2012"
6	18 January 2012	Margriet Eshuijs	"House for Sale"	"Daar ben je dan"
6	18 January 2012	RB Djan	"Hier ben ik dan"	"Dit keer is het anders"
7	25 January 2012	Ronnie Tober	"Rozen voor Sandra"	"Er is niemand zoals jij"
7	25 January 2012	Priester	"Geen 1"	"Rozen voor Sandra 2012"
8	1 February 2012	Liesbeth List	"Pastorale"	"Ik pluk de dag"
8	1 February 2012	Sticky Steez	"Spaanse vlieg"	"Pastorale 2012"

=== Season 3 ===
Episode #	Date of broadcast	Artist	Chosen hit	Remake song
1	12 December 2012	Jan Keizer and Anny Schilder (BZN)	"Mon amour"	"Gypsy"
1	12 December 2012	Murda Turk	"Gypsy"	"Mon amour 2012"
2	19 December 2012	Koos Alberts	"Ik verscheurde je foto"	"Wat geweest is, telt niet meer"
2	19 December 2012	Nino	"Lucifer"	"Ik verscheurde je foto 2012"
3	2 January 2013	Peter Koelewijn	"Kom van dat dak af"	"Niet zo mij"
3	2 January 2013	Typhoon	"Zo niet mij"	"Kom van dat dak af 2013"
4	9 January 2013	Ria Valk	"Hou je echt nog van mij, Rocking Billy?"	"Baby"
4	9 January 2013	Jayh	"Mijn baby"	"Lieve Ria"
5	16 January 2013	Het Goede Doel	België"	"Alle moeders heten mama"
5	16 January 2013	Mr. Polska	"Berghuis"	"België" 2013
6	23 January 2013	Astrid Nijgh	"Ik doe wat ik doe"	"Wonder"
6	23 January 2013	Sjaak	"Baby Go Down"	"Doe wat ik doe"
7	30 January 2013	Maggie MacNeal	"Terug naar de kust"	"It Ain't No Use"
7	30 January 2013	BolleBof	"Het heeft geen zin"	"Terug naar de kust 2013"
8	6 February 2013	Danny de Munk	"Ik voel me zo verdomd alleen"	"Tuig van de richel"
8	6 February 2013	Lil' Kleine	"Tuig van de richel"	"Ik voel me zo verdomd alleen 2013"

== Awards ==
In March 2011, Ali B op volle toeren won the Positive Young Media Award, specifically given to ventures that create positive role models for young people through the media. The jury mentioned the show's ability to bring together old and new Dutch cultures in a perfect match, in their citations for awarding the prize.

In May 2011, the Dutch show also received an honorable mention during presentation of the Zilveren Nipkowschijf awards event. In 2012, the Dutch show was nominated for the "Gouden Televizier-Ring", but the award eventually went to The Voice of Holland

Other versions have also won awards. Very notably the German version of the show Cover My Song was awarded the 2012 Deutscher Fernsehpreis, the main German Television Awards in the category "docutainment".

== CDs / DVDs ==
The interpretations from the first season of the program (except those of Anneke Gröhnloh and Stef Bos) were released in CD form in 2011. On iTunes, a further track "Meisje luister" by Willeke Alberti featuring Ali B was also made available. Ali B can be downloaded

All episodes were also released on a double DVD containing all eight episodes, with the CD provided as additional bonus for the DVD buyers.

Track list

1. "De troubadour 2011" – Keizer & Ali B
2. "De clown 2011" – Fresku & Ali B
3. "Telkens weer 2011" – Kleine Viezerik & Ali B
4. "Vaders" – Negativ & Ali B
5. "Bonnie" – Darryl & Ali B feat. Brownie Dutch
6. "Rosamunde 2011" – Yes-R & Ali B feat. Brownie Dutch
7. "Brandend hart" – Gio & Ali B
8. "'t Is voorbij" – Winne & Ali B feat. Brownie Dutch
9. "Spijt" – Lenny Kuhr
10. "Hé man" – Ben Cramer
11. "Luister meisje" – Willeke Alberti
12. "Eeyeeyoo 2011" – Bonnie St. Claire (live)
13. "Ik ben niet meer van jou" – Dennie Christian
14. "32 jaar later" – Henny Vrienten
15. "Meisje luister" – Willeke Alberti feat. Ali B (bonus exclusively on iTunes)

== See also ==
- In de mix
- Cover My Song
