= Deluxe Records =

Record label

- Founded: 2003
- Founder: Samy Deluxe
- Genre: Hip hop
- Country of origin: Germany
- Location: Hamburg
- Official website: www.deluxe-records.de

Deluxe Records is the record label of German hip-hop artist Samy Deluxe.

== History ==
After Hamburg label Eimsbush went bankrupt in 2003, Dynamite Deluxe member Samy Deluxe founded a new label within the same year called Deluxe Records. At first, it was part of Capitol Records which is owned by EMI. The first artists besides Samy Deluxe himself were the rap group Headliners and rapper Illo. To make them known and to help distributing mixtapes and merchandise, Samy founded the branch Hamburgs Finest. Starting off on the internet, Hamburgs Finest Mixtape Vol. 4 - So Deluxe So Glorious was the first mixtape to retail. 2005 compilation album Deluxe Records - Let's Go, together with the Let's-Go-Tour, helped introducing the label to further audience.

In 2006, five other artists signed contracts with Deluxe Records. They were Munich rapper Ali A$, Ruhr Area artists Manuellsen and Snaga & Pillath as well as Cologne rapper Blade.

On February 12, 2007, an internet show called Deluxe Zoom started broadcasting live performances and backstage footage of the label's artists. The episodes appeared at irregular intervals and today, no more episodes will be produced.

In July 2007, Deluxe Records broke away from Capitol Records/ EMI and is now an independent label distributed over Groove Attack. Solely Same Deluxe's albums will be released over Capitol Records. In December 2007, rapper TUA, formerly signed on Royal Bunker, joined Deluxe Records. On March 14, 2008, Snaga & Pillath broke up with Deluxe Records due to misunderstandings relating to business. Manuellsen also left the label in 2008. Illo, who quit his rap career, and Blade also followed in the same year.

As of now, Deluxe Records consists of Samy Deluxe, Ali A$ and TUA. In December 2008, they released a sampler with the title Liebling, ich habe das Label geschrumpft. It is translated Honey, I Shrunk the Label, which obviously is a parody of the motion picture Honey, I Shrunk the Kids due to the cut of signed artists on the label.

== Releases ==
=== Albums ===
Year	Title	Artist	Chart Positions		
Year	Title	Artist	GER	AUT	CH
2004	Verdammtnochma!	Samy Deluxe	2	10	9
2005	Deluxe Records - Let's Go	Deluxe Records	26	52	53
2006	Insallah	Manuellsen			
2006	Das Album zum Film	Headliners			
2007	Aus Liebe zum Spiel	Snaga & Pillath	38		
2007	Wer wenn nicht ich?	Illo	97		
2008	Bombe	Ali A$			
2008	Liebling, ich habe das Label geschrumpft	Deluxe Records			
2009	Grau	TUA			
2009	Dis' wo ich herkomm	Samy Deluxe	3		

=== Singles ===
Year	Title	Artist	Chart Positions			Album
Year	Title	Artist	GER	AUT	CH	Album
2004	"Zurück"	Samy Deluxe				
2004	"Warum?"	Samy Deluxe feat. Vibe				
2005	"Generation"	Samy Deluxe				

- 2005: Samy Deluxe - Let's Go
- 2006: Headliners - Sag ihnen Bescheid
- 2006: Manuellsen - Meine Zeit/True Story ("My Time/")
- 2006: Manuellsen - Dear Christin
- 2007: Snaga & Pillath - R.U.H.R.P.O.T.T. (feat. Manuellsen)
- 2007: Illo - Sie ist... (feat. Emory) ("She is...")
- 2007: Illo - Oh mein Gott (feat. Emory) ("Oh My God")
- 2007: Snaga & Pillath - Einen Tag (feat. Manuellsen)
- 2007: Manuellsen - Vor-Bye
- 2008: Tua - Inzwischen (EP)
- 2008: Sugon Sia - More Than 2 Cocks inz de Mouf
- 2008: Ali As - Ich bin ein Star, holt mich hier raus

== See also ==
- List of record labels
