= Helene Lange Gymnasium =

Helene-Lange-Gymnasium
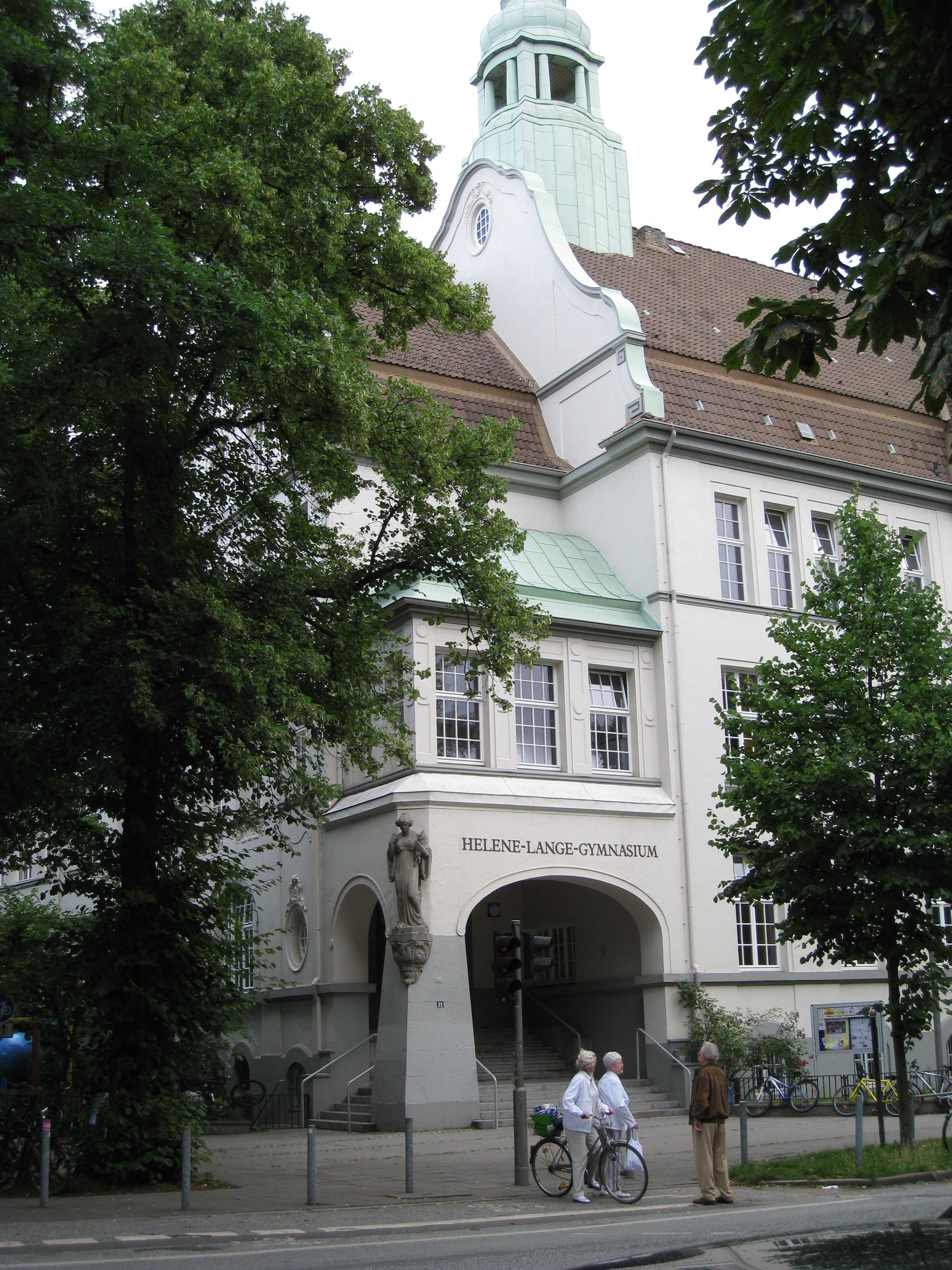

Location
- Hamburg; Germany; 53°34′24.6″N 9°58′24.7″E

Information
- Founded: 1910
- Head of school: Holger Müller
- Faculty: ~ 75
- Enrollment: ~ 930
- Website: www.hlg-hamburg.de

The Helene Lange Gymnasium (HLG) is a public gymnasium (high school) in the city of Hamburg, Germany. It was founded in 1910 as Höhere Mädchenschule (girls' school for higher education), and after the passing of the mixed-sex education bill in 1969, it became accessible to boys in 1970. In that same year the school also offered its first bilingual program in German and English, effectively becoming the first bilingual Gymnasium in Hamburg.

Lying in the south-west of the Hamburg quarter Harvestehude on the border with Eimsbüttel, the Helene-Lange-Gymnasium currently has around 930 students from 46 nationalities.

== Historical references ==
=== Name ===
The HLG has had a long history of changing its name. The Hamburg senate gave the school the name Staatliche höhere Mädchenschule an der Hansastraße. By 1926, the school was renamed from Lyzeum mit Studienanstalt an der Hansastraße to Mädchen-Oberrealschule an der Hansastraße. The change in name from Lyzeum to Oberrealschule created an opportunity to name the school after Helene Lange, a prominent pedagogue and feminist. It was in 1926, that the school was finally given the name Helene-Lange-Oberrealschule, in small part because only a tenth part of the school's periphery was actually on Hansa street.

=== Edification ===
The building which today houses the Helene-Lange-Gymnasium was built between 1908 and 1910 by the architect Albert Erbe, and officially opened on 4 January 1910, at the same time as Gymnasium Lerchenfeld, which shared similar characteristics and objectives, and whose main building was designed by the same architect.

=== Nazi era ===
Some 300 Jewish pupils passed through the school, between 1910 and 1933. In 1935, on the occasion of the school's 25th anniversary, the school's name was renamed to Hansa-Oberrealschule. At the ceremony, the headmaster, who had believed the school's inclusive nature ("Völkerversöhnung") was a detriment to German nationality and to the "preferment of the Jewish element" within the school, said the school was imbued with a "new spirit", noting that nearly a fifth of the girls were members of the Nazi BDM. At that point began a decline in the number of Jewish students, and by 1939 there were no more pupils of the Jewish faith.

== International recognition ==
The Helene-Lange-Gymnasium is one of Germany's first UNESCO project schools. Since 2003 the school also offers the International Baccalaureate additionally to the Abitur. It maintains sponsorships with schools in Dar es Salaam, Havana, Chicago, and London.

== Notable alumni ==
- Emmy Beckmann (1880-1967), educator, politician and women's rights activist
- Helene Weiss (1898-1951), German and British philosopher and classical scholar
- Jan Delay, singer
- Leonamor, music group
