= Helene Weiss =

German philosopher (born 1898)

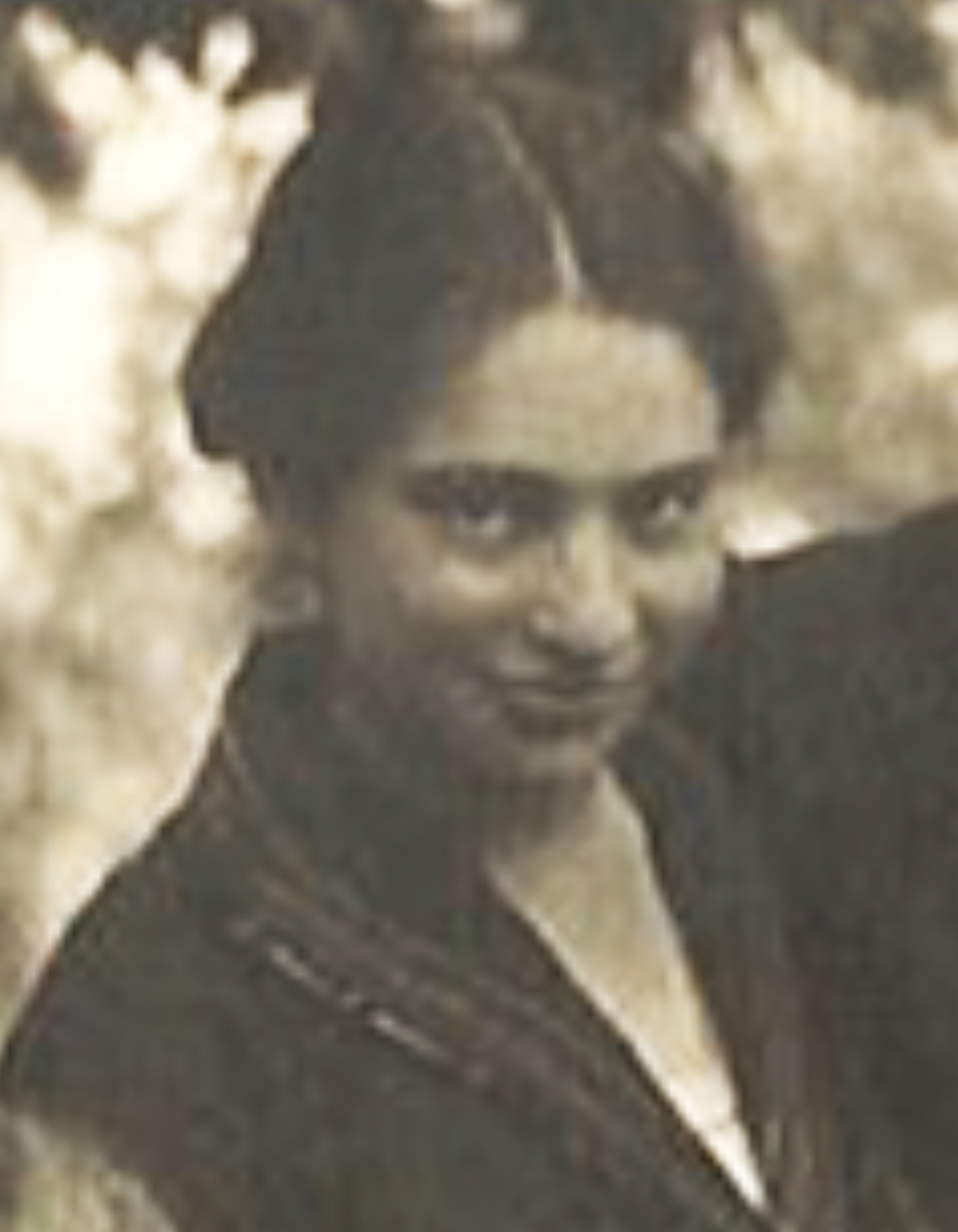
- Weiss in 1920
- Born: 24 October 1898; Żagań, Province of Silesia, German Empire
- Died: 1951; Basel, Switzerland

Helene Weiss (24 October 1898 – 1951) was a German philosopher. Among the earliest disciples of Martin Heidegger, she studied with him from the early 1920s through the early 1930s, whereupon she fled Nazi Germany and became a scholar especially of ancient Greek philosophy abroad. Her carefully edited notes of the discussion in Heidegger's seminars, in 1921–1934, which she collated with those of others, revealed the importance of close Aristotle scholarship in the development of Being and Time; they have recently become a theme of intense research.

== Life ==
Helene Weiss was born on 24 October 1898 in Sagan, Silesia, Imperial Germany (today Żagań, Poland). Her parents were Hermann Weiss (1852–1921) and Babette Weiss (1872–1943), née Rosenbacher. Her father was from Boskovice in Moravia and became a factory owner in Sagan, where Weiss was born; Weiss' mother was born in Hamburg in 1872 and died in exile in Oxford, England, in 1943. Weiss attended the secondary school for girls in Sagan from 1905 to 1914 and a private lyceum in Hamburg from Easter 1914 to Easter 1915, where she obtained her school-leaving certificate. From 1915 to 1918, she attended the Oberrealschule an der Hansastraße in Hamburg, where she passed her Abitur at Easter 1918. In 1922, she passed the Latinum at the Realgymnasium in Mannheim.

From 1919 to 1936, she studied philosophy, history, classical philology, theology, art history and archaeology at the universities of Marburg, Munich, Freiburg and Basel with interruptions. In 1930, she began a doctorate under Heidegger at Freiburg. She completed her dissertation in 1934 but did not receive a degree. Heidegger much later stated, in apparent defense of his actions in this period,

One of my oldest and most gifted students, Helene Weiss, who later emigrated to Scotland, took her degree in Basel (after continued study at Freiburg became impossible)

Victor Farías, a later student—a translator and editor of Weiss' 1934 notes for a seminar on logic—took a different view, quoting the German philosopher Ernst Tugendhat

In 1934, Heidegger rejected Helene Weiß as a doctoral candidate because she was Jewish («weil sie Jüdin war») (Ernst Tugendhat, Interview with Radio Suisse-Romande DRS 2, 29.9.1989). She had studied with Heidegger since 1920.

Weiss fled to Switzerland and took the doctorate at Basel in 1935 under the direction of Herman Schmalenbach, a student of Eucken and Paul Häberlin. The publication of her dissertation, Chance in the Philosophy of Aristotle, was delayed by the circumstances of the time and finally appeared in Basel under the title Causality and Chance in the Philosophy of Aristotle in 1942, later republished posthumously in Darmstadt in 1967. At Basel, in addition to the support from the philosophers Schmalenbach and Häberlin, her studies in classics were supported by the important Swiss classical scholar de:Peter von der Mühll. With their help, she was able to continue her Aristotle studies at the University of Cambridge from 1937. She remained in Great Britain throughout and after the war, ultimately teaching mainly at the University of Glasgow, until her death. She died in 1951 under treatment in Basel. Her academic publications written after 1937 are written in English.

== Notes of Heidegger's seminars ==
Throughout the 1920s and into the early 30s, Weiss took notes of the manifold seminars of Martin Heidegger she attended, supplementing them with copies of the lecture notes made by fellow students including Hermann Mörchen (1906–1990), Hans W. Loewald (1906–1993) and Franz Josef Brecht (1899–1982). Immediately after the end of the Second World War, Weiss handed this extensive archive of Heidegger's formative academic teaching to her nephew, Ernst Tugendhat (1930–2023), later a major German philosopher. In 1992, Tugendhat, who had studied classics at Stanford 1944—1949, deposited the archive for research purposes with the Stanford University library, where it was first overseen by the Heidegger researcher and religion scholar Thomas Sheehan.

A number of studies and a recent book, attempt, via the Weiss notes, to characterize especially the importance of Aristotle in the early seminars of the 1920s and the development of Being and Time.

== Selected texts ==
Chief work:

- Helene Weiss: Kausalität und Zufall in der Philosophie des Aristoteles. Wissenschaftliche Buchgemeinschaft 1967. (Reprint of the Basel 1942 edition).
  - Major English language reviews:
    - Friedrich Solmsen, The Philosophical Review, Volume 54, Issue 6, November 1945
    - Fritz Kaufmann, Philosophy and Phenomenological Research , Sep., 1946, Vol. 7, No. 1 (Sep., 1946), pp. 164-169
    - F. H. Heinemann, Philosophy 21, no. 79 (1946): 184-186.
    - Kurt von Fritz, The Journal of Philosophy, Vol. 41, No. 16 (Aug. 3, 1944), pp. 439-444

Scholarly essays:

- "Democritus‘ theory of cognition", The Classical Quarterly, Vol. 32 (1938), pp. 47–56. ISSN 1471-6844.
- "The Greek conceptions of time and being in the light of Heidegger's philosophy", Philosophy and Phenomenological Research, vol 2 (1941) 173–187. ISSN 1933-1592.
- "An interpretative note on a passage in Plotinus on eternity and time", Classical Philology, vol. 36 (1941), no. 3, 230–239. ISSN 1546-072X.
- "Notes on the Greek ideas referred to in van Helmont De tempore", Isis, vol. 33 (1941/42), 624. ISSN 1545-6994.
- "Aristotle's teleology and Uexküll's theory of living nature", The Classical Quarterly, Vol. 42 (1948), H. 1/2. Pp. 44–58. ISSN 1471-6844.
- "Notes on the Greek ideas referred to in van Helmont De tempore", Osiris, vol. 8 (1948), 418-449. ISSN 0079-7827.

Published Weiss seminar notes:

- Martin Heidegger: Lógica. Lecciones de M. Heidegger (semestre verano 1934) en el legado de Helene Weiss. (= Textos y documentos. Clásicos del pensiamento y de las ciencias; vol. 12). Bilingual edition. Verlag Anthropos, Barcelona 1991. L, 136 pp., ISBN 84-7658-305-2. (Introduction and translation by Víctor Farías).
  - Review: Dieter Thomä: Martin Heidegger: 'Lógica'. Lecciones de M. Heidegger (semestre verano 1934) en el legado de Helene Weiss. In: Frankfurter Allgemeine Zeitung of 11 February 1992. p. 35.
- Martin Heidegger, Übungen über Aristoteles, De Anima / Seminar on Aristotle's De Anima (Summer Semester 1921) Kronos Philosophical Journal, X, 38-188 The notes are published in German and English alongside those of mathematician and philosopher Oskar Becker, in a format explained by the editor and translator, Francisco J. Gonzalez, "Introduction to Heidegger’s 1921 Summer Semester Seminar on Aristotle’s De Anima as Recorded in the Handwritten Notes of Helene Weiss and Oskar Becker" pp. 35-7

Archive of Weiss Heidegger notes:

- Helene Weiss Heidegger lecture notes. M0631. Dept. of Special Collections, Stanford University Libraries, Stanford, Calif.
