= Denyo =

German rapper and singer

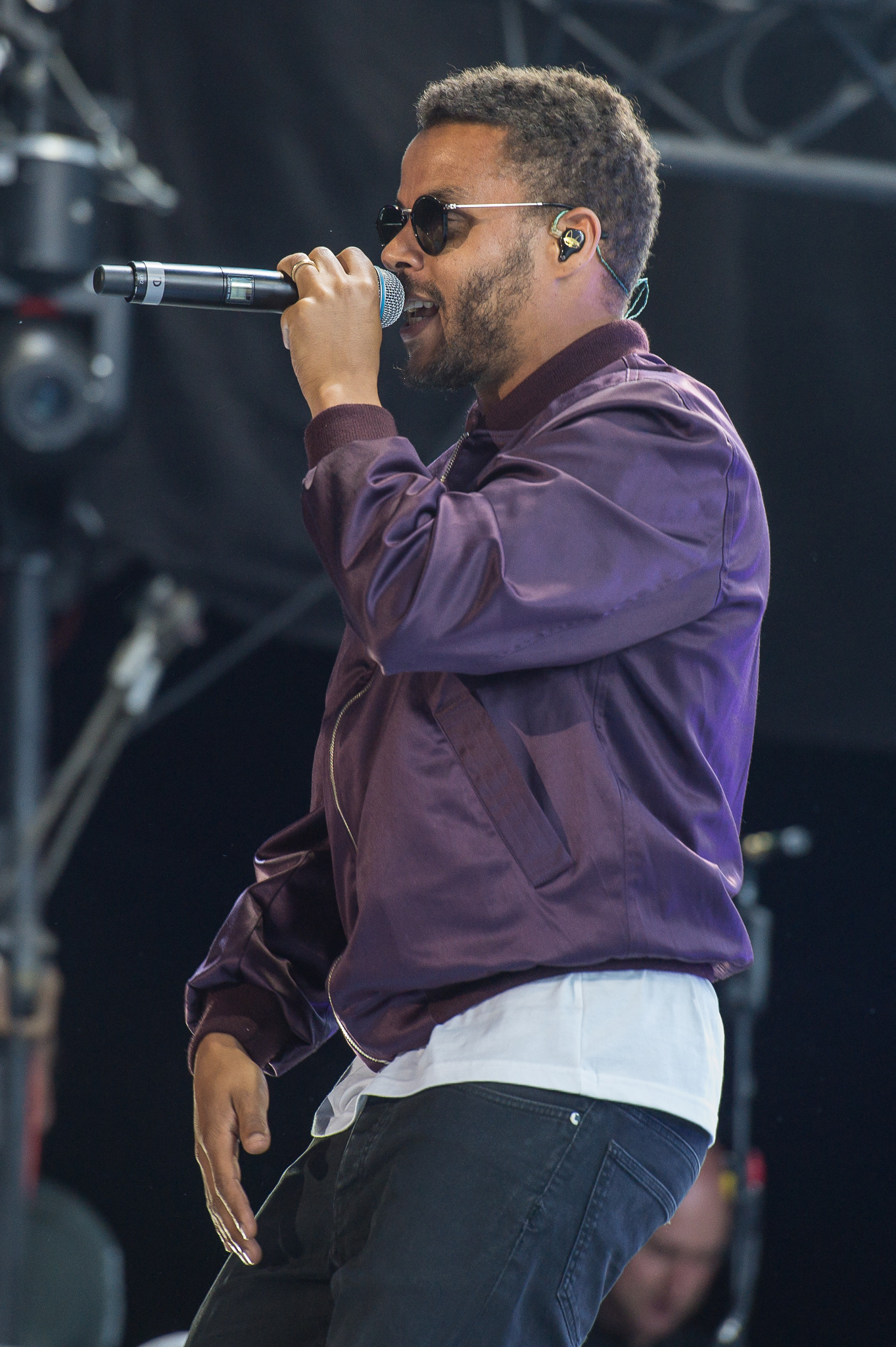

Background information
- Birth name: Dennis Lisk
- Also known as: Denyo 77; Dennis Dubplate; Dennis Deutschland
- Born: 1977 (age 47–48); Hamburg, Germany
- Genres: Hip hop, soul
- Occupation(s): Rapper, singer, presenter
- Years active: 1993–present
- Labels: Universal
- Member of: Beginner, Brothers Keepers

Dennis Lisk (born 1977 in Hamburg), also known as Denyo, Denyo 77, Dennis Deutschland and Dennis Dubplate, is a German soul and hip hop musician and radio presenter. He was also host of the German television series Cover My Song.

== Music career ==
Lisk started his music career in the 1990s in the band formation Absolute Beginner (later just Beginner) that released three albums, Flashnizm (1996), Bambule (1998) and Blast Action Heroes (2003). The latter, their most successful, peaked at #1 in German Albums Chart and reached #3 in the Ö3 Austria Top 40 Albums Chart. They were signed to Universal with main members with Dennis Lisk as Denyo, Jan Delay (Eißfeldt) and DJ Mad. Other members were DJ Burn, rappers Nabil Sheikh, Mirko and Platin Martin.

While in the band, he released Minidsico in 2001 under the name Denyo77. It included self-produced tracks as well as collaborations from Eißfeldt 65, Glammerlicious, Milan and DJ Dynamite and featuring Eißfeldt 65 (also known as Hans Werner Votz), DJ Mad an den Cuts, Illo, Paolo 77, D-Flame and Das Bo. Also starting 2001, he worked in anti-racism project Brothers Keepers, in a collective of many artists from various genres (hip hop, reggae, soul), that included Xavier Naidoo, D-Flame, Ziggy Marley, Patrice, Gentleman, Torch. His single from the album "Irgendwie, Irgendwo, Irgendwann" was Top 5 in Germany, Austria and Switzerland.

His second album, released in 2005 was titled The Denyos and was produced by Tropf, DJ Dynamited, Lars Mellow and Chris Tall and tracks featuring Eizi Eiz, Ms Marx and DJ Mad an den Cuts. One single was released titled "Ain't No Punchline When He's Gone".

In July 2009, he released the solo album Suchen & Finden with contract signed with Four Music.

== Radio and television ==
Dennis Lisk has also built a radio and television career. Once a week, he hosts Top of the Blogs on Hamburg radio station N-Joy. In 2011, he also hosted the inaugural season of Cover My Song, a television series bringing together artists from pop music and from hip hop / rap to "remake" known hits of each other in a bid for generating crossover modern hit interpretations. The program has won German Television Awards.

== Personal life ==
Lisk is married and has two children, a son and a daughter.

== Discography ==
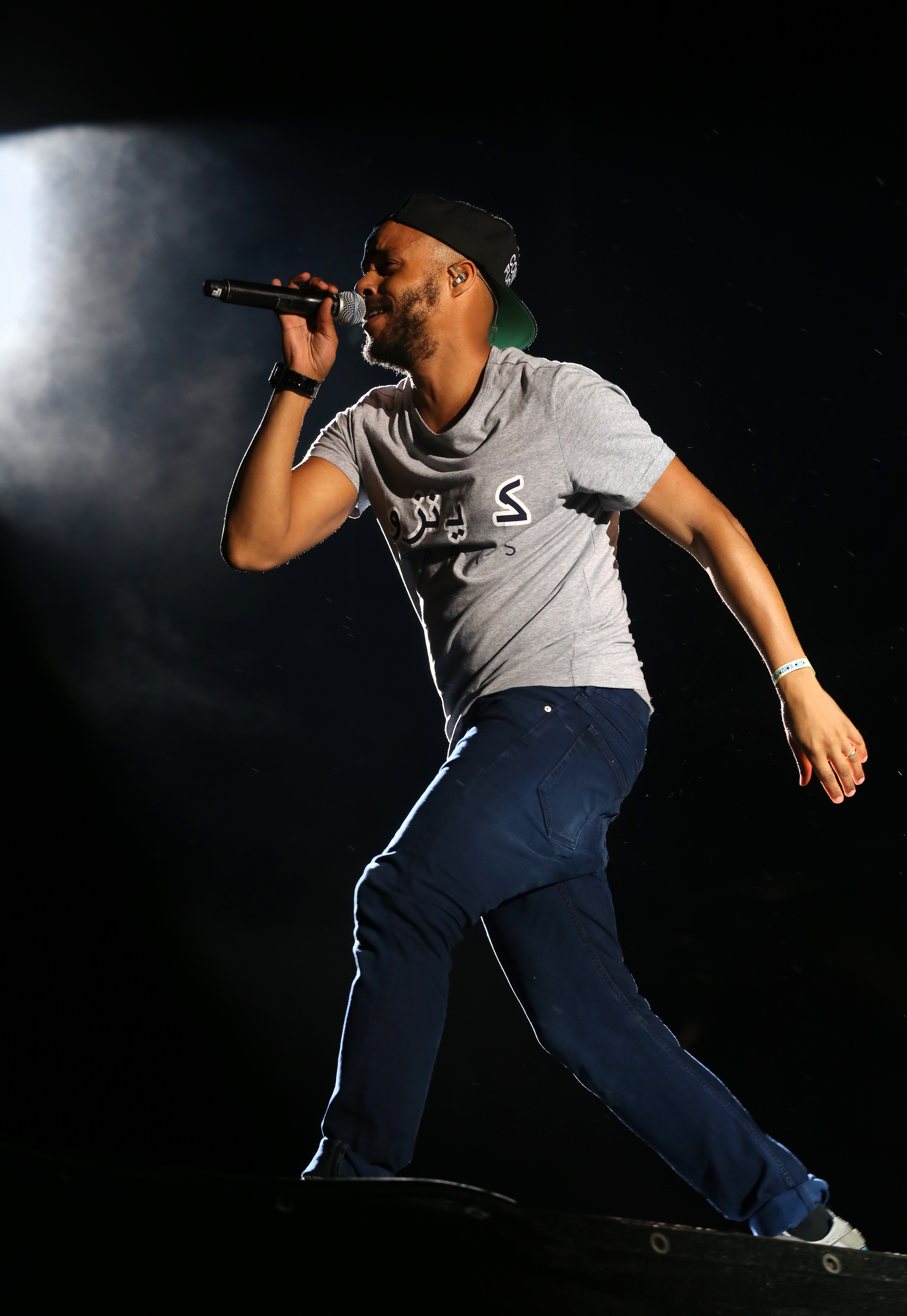
Denyo (2013)

with Absolute Beginner / Beginner

- 1996: Flashnizm [Buback]
- 1998: Bambule [Universal]
- 2000: Boombule (Bambule Remixed) [Universal]
- 2003: Blast Action Heroes [Universal]
- 2016: Advanced Chemistry [Universal]

Solo albums

Year	Album	Peak positions		
Year	Album	GER	AUT	SUI
2001	Minidisco * Credited as: Denyo * Record label: Buback/Motor	63	–	–
2005	The Denyos * Credited as: Denyo * Record label: Universal	93	–	–
2009	Suchen & Finden * Credited as: Dennis Lisk * Record label: Buback/Motor	73	–	–
2015	DERBE * Credited as: Denyo * Record label: BMG Rights Management GmbH	16	60	86

=== Singles ===
Year	Single	Peak positions		
Year	Single	GER	AUT	SUI
1999	"Irgendwie, Irgendwo, Irgendwann" (with Jan Delay)	2	2	5
2005	"Ain't No Punchline When He's Gone"	93	–	–

Song releases

- 1997 – "Ich und Ich" feat. Station 17 (Me, myself & I)
- 1998 – "Kein Thema" feat. Andi (Urban (Universal)) (No problem/No issue)
- 1999 – "Styleliga No.2" (Eimsbush) (Styleleague No.2)
- 2001 – "Single Sells" (Universal)
- 2001 – "Was Nun" (Universal) (What now?)
- 2001 – "Traumtrio" feat. Paolo 77 & Illo 77 (Dreamtrio)
- 2005 – "The Denyos" (Universal)
- 2005 – "The Denyos" (Juice Exclusive – CD #55)
- 200x – "Easy" feat. Nico Suave – released online
- 2006 – "Hart aber izzo" feat. Torch (Juice – CD #63) (Hard but izzo)
