= In de mix =

Flemish television series

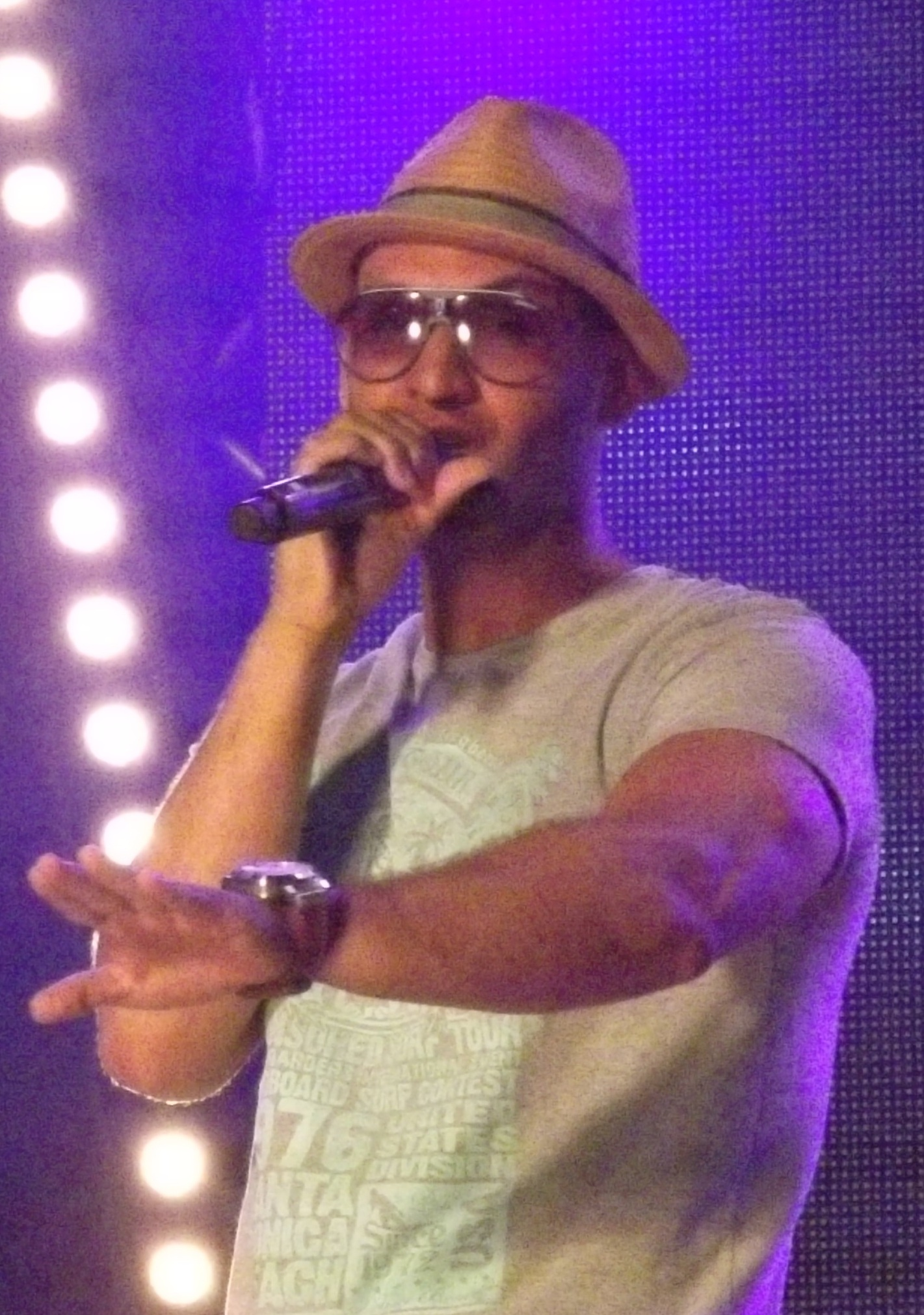
Brahim, host of the show In de mix

In de mix is a Flemish television series launched in 2012 and hosted by Moroccan-Belgian R&B singer Brahim Attaeb known as Brahim. The program brings in two artists from pop and hip hop traditions, in an attempt to make via remakes and covers of well-known earlier hits, new crossover hits that fusions between various genres of music. The inaugural season of the program was broadcast on Eén Belgian Flemish station. It is an adaptation of original series of shows done on Dutch television station TROS and hosted by fellow Moroccan-Dutch artist Ali B and entitled Ali B op volle toeren. There is also a German adaptation on VOX called "Cover My Song" and hosted by Dennis Lisk.

== Season 1 ==
Sixteen artists took part in season 1 in a total of 8 episodes. There were also performances the week following each episode on MNM radio with some of the rap renditions including additional vocals by the host Brahim.

The performances were:

Episode	Date of broadcast	Artist (singer)	Hit title (song)	Rapper	Hit title (rap)
1	6 September 2012	Bart Kaëll	"De Marie-Louise"	Kain	"Leider"
2	13 September 2012	Rita Deneve	"De allereerste keer"	Jasine Ledoux	"Atlas"
3	20 September 2012	Raymond van het Groenewoud	"Meisjes"	Walter Ego	"Rode tl's"
4	27 September 2012	Liliane Saint-Pierre	"Soldiers of Love"	Mr. Pillow	"Met je ogen dicht (Fix the Weather)"
5	4 October 2012	Bart Herman	"Ik ga dood aan jou"	Don Luca	"Bella Puglia"
6	11 October 2012	Paul Severs	"Zeg eens meisje"	Yuboy Jeffrey	"Google mij"
7	18 October 2012	Nicole & Hugo	"Goeiemorgend, goeiendag (Goeiemorgen, morgen)	Slongs Dievanongs	"Alles wat telt (A mate)"
8	25 October 2012	Johan Verminnen	"Laat me nu toch niet alleen"	Baadasssss	"Ja ja, zo ben ik dan (Ik ben ton azwo)

=== Album In de mix ===
A compilation album containing all the new performances was released on Sony Music Belgium.

1. Bart Kaëll - "Leider" (3:10)
2. Kain feat. Brahim & Bart Kaell - "De Marie-Louise" (2:53)
3. Rita Deneve - "Atlas" (2:49)
4. Jasine feat. Brahim - "De allereerste keer" (3:22)
5. Raymond Van Het Groenewoud - "Rode tl's" (3:16)
6. Walter Ego feat. Brahim - "Meisjes bart" (3:38)
7. Liliane Saint-Pierre - "Met je ogen dicht (Fix the Weather)" (3:27)
8. Mr. Pillow feat, Brahim - "Soldiers of Love" (3:22)
9. Bart Herman - "Bella Puglia" (3:49)
10. Don Luca feat. Brahim - "Ik ga dood aan jou" (3:18)
11. Paul Severs - "Google mij" (3:24)
12. Yuboy Jeffrey feat. Brahim - "Zeg eens meisje" (4:01)
13. Nicole & Hugo - "Alles wat telt (A mate)" (3:15)
14. Slongs Dievanongs feat. Brahim - "Goeiemorgend, goeiendag (Goeiemorgen, morgen) (3:44)
15. Johan Verminnen - "Ja ja, zo ben ik dan (Ik ben ton azwo) (2:55)
16. Baadasssss feat. Brahim - "Laat me nu toch niet alleen (3:33)

== See also ==
- Ali B op volle toeren
- Cover My Song
