= Cover My Song =

2011 German television series

Cover My Song is a German television series broadcast on VOX channel and hosted by German hip hop artist Dennis Lisk also known by his stage name Denyo. The program is formatted on the successful Dutch television series Ali B op volle toeren that had premiered on the Dutch TROS channel. The first German series ran from 30 August 2011 until 11 October 2011 and included 7 episodes.

== Format ==
The program is prepared as a "docutainment" (documentary entertainment) in which the viewers would learn about the story of German artists, follow their progress in their own words and discover their artistic process in making their hits. The host/presenter would invite in each episode an artist from the pop music tradition, and another artist from hip hop / rap tradition. They would pick a typical well-known song from the other artist's repertoire in a bid to prepare a "remake" / or cover version of the song and vice versa. Partaking artists are encouraged to use their own style giving the hits a real new twist. At the end of each episode, the artists get together with the host to perform the new interpretations, with many times the host participating in parts of the renditions. The artists would exchange opinions about the new revived versions.

== Ratings ==
Cover My Song was followed on average of 950,000 viewers corresponding to a 4.4% market share, well below the station's average (5.7%). In the key demographic group of 14–49, it was seen on average by 690,000 viewers (7.3% of market share). The inaugural show saw the biggest following at 1,260,000.

== Awards ==
In 2012, Cover My Song was nominated for Grimme-Preis in the "best Entertainment" category, but did not win the prize. It was also nominated for the German Television Award in the "Best Documentary Entertainment / docutainment" award. The jury cited that it was "a refreshing program that generated merging of various musical genres".

== Season 1 ==
Episode	date of broadcast	Artist (singer)	Hit title (song)	Rapper	Hit title (rap)
1	30 August 2011	Chris Roberts	"Du kannst nicht immer 17 sein"	MoTrip	"Albtraum"
2	6 September 2011	Katja Ebstein	"Wunder gibt es immer wieder"	JokA	"Immer dann"
3	13 September 2011	Michael Holm	"Keiner kennt meinen Namen"	Kitty Kat	"Kriegerin"
4	20 September 2011	Ingrid Peters	"Komm doch mal rüber"	Dr. Knarf	"8 Takte"
5	27 September 2011	Cindy & Bert	"Immer wieder sonntags"	Favorite	"Ich vermiss euch"
6	4 October 2011	Gunter Gabriel	"Hey Boss, ich brauch' mehr Geld"	Fard	"Peter Pan"
7	11 October 2011	Ireen Sheer	"Heut' abend hab' ich Kopfweh"	Lil'O	"Nimm meine Hand"

== See also ==
- Ali B op volle toeren
- In de mix
