= Samy Deluxe (album) =

Studio album by Samy Deluxe
- Released: 20 April 2001
- Genre: Hip hop
- Label: EMI Group

Samy Deluxe chronology
Samy Deluxe (2001)	Verdammtnochma! (2004)

Samy Deluxe is the self-titled debut album by German rapper Samy Deluxe, released on 20 April 2001 over EMI. In Germany sold the album 150.000 times, making it a Gold record.

== Track listing ==
No.	Title	Length
1.	"Wickeda MC"	3:28
2.	"Die Meisten" ("The Most")	3:56
3.	"S.O.S."	4:04
4.	"Eppendorf" (featuring Illo 77)	3:26
5.	"Positiv" ("Positive")	3:07
6.	"Is nich' wahr"	3:55
7.	"Der Beste" ("The Best")	3:16
8.	"Beat & Rap"	4:17
9.	"Sensationell" ("Sensational")	3:07
10.	"Hab' gehört..." ("I've Heard")	3:45
11.	"Samy Deluxe 2001"	3:36
12.	"Dreist" ("Cheeky")	3:49
13.	"So soll's sein" ("Tha's How It Should Be", featuring Afrob)	3:28
14.	"Hausfriedensbruch" ("Domestic Disturbance")	4:48
15.	"Session" (featuring Dendemann, Illo 77 & Nico Suave)	3:55
16.	"Weck mich auf" ("Wake Me Up")	5:43
17.	"Internetional Love"	3:58
18.	"Mach Schluss" ("End It")	3:15

== Charts ==
=== Weekly charts ===
Chart (2001)	Peak position
Austrian Albums (Ö3 Austria)	31
German Albums (Offizielle Top 100)	2
Swiss Albums (Schweizer Hitparade)	55

=== Year-end charts ===
Chart (2001)	Position
German Albums (Offizielle Top 100)	36

== Sources ==
- http://www.laut.de/Samy-Deluxe/Samy-Deluxe-%28Album%29
