= Dis wo ich herkomm =

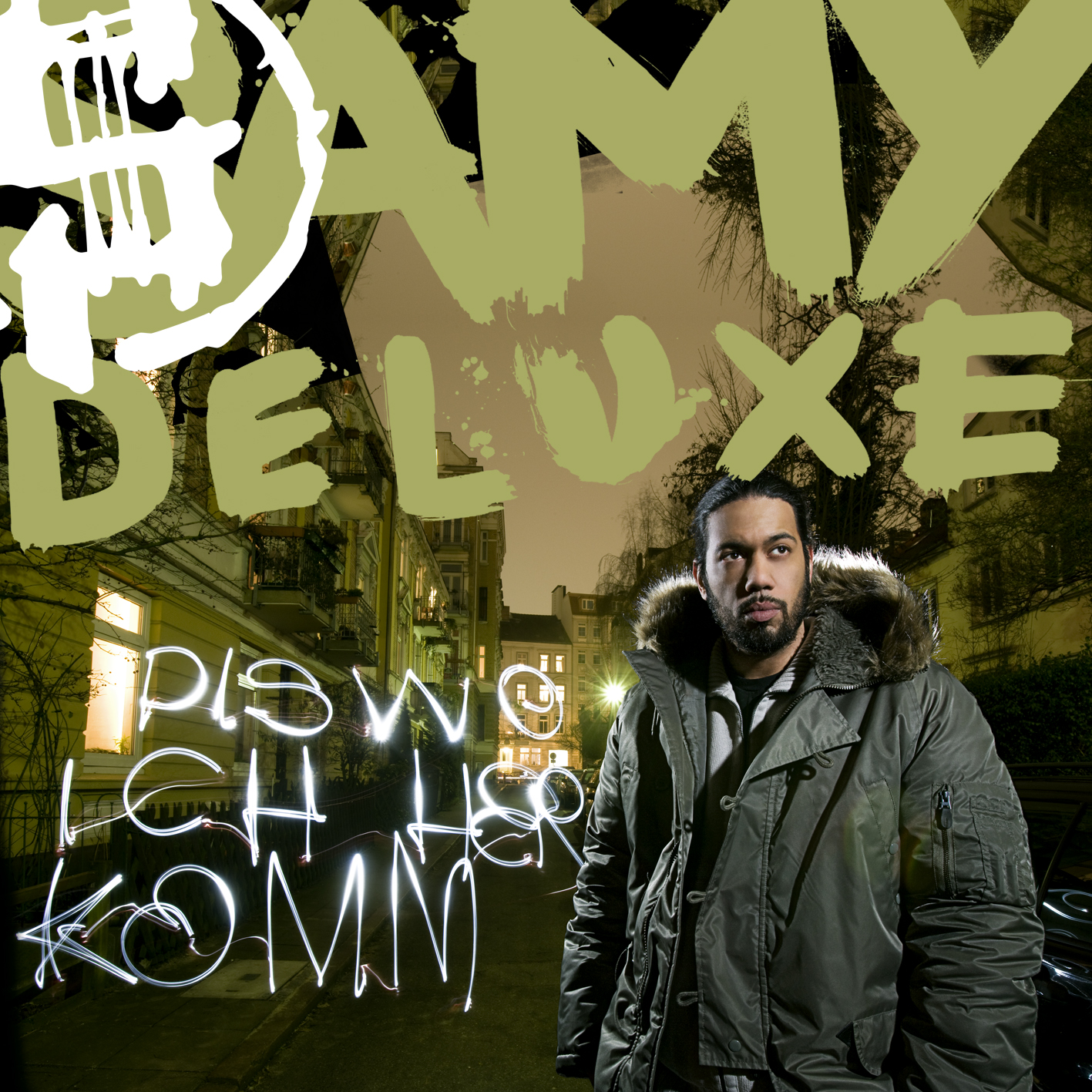

Studio album by Samy Deluxe
- Released: 27 March 2009
- Genres: Hip hop, pop, reggae
- Label: EMI
- Producer: S. Sorge

Samy Deluxe chronology
Verdammtnochma! (2004)	Dis wo ich herkomm (2009)	Der letzte Tanz (2009)

Dis wo ich herkomm ("Dis where I come from") is the third solo album by Hamburg-based rapper Samy Deluxe. It was released on 27 March 2009 on the EMI label. The album contains many hip hop songs, but also had influences of pop and reggae elements.

The lyrics primarily focus on Samy's relationship to Germany and caused a controversy due to its blatant call for more patriotism. Several media thus accused Samy of nationalism, though many others approved him for his courage to be honest. The song nonetheless attained the third place in German charts and inspired Deluxe's book Dis wo ich herkomm: Deutschland Deluxe that was published in June 2009.

== Music ==
Some songs on the album are based on a hip hop beat. Songs such as "Bis die Sonne rauskommt", "Sowieso schwer" and "Oma Song" contains elements of reggae. Pop elements can also be heard on songs like "Wer ich bin" and "Deshalb".

== Lyrics ==
In the title song "Dis wo ich herkomm", Samy rates the situation in Germany and calls for more national pride. Among other things, he praises the possibilities Germany offers, and cultural diversity. He furthermore calls on the audience to stop talking about "the old times", thus demanding an end to the continuing shame arising from the National Socialist era, and the emergence of a new positive national identity. Although underlining that Germany is his country, Samy tells the audience that he had hated it for a long time. Songs such as "Weck mich auf" (Wake Me) and "Generation" transported a negative picture of Germany. His change of mind occurred during his sojourn in San Francisco in 2005. There, he asserted that Germany was a good basis for cultural diversity and enabled him to get involved with society which is more important to him than material wealth.

The song "Bis die Sonne rauskommt" stresses Samy's attitude as he pleads for "more colours in the country". Germany is a grey, cold and inflexible nation whose culture is antiquated and whose citizens are bad-tempered. But it has the potential to become more "colourful", referring to several different groups, such as immigrants and gays.

Samy Deluxe, the son of a German mother and a Sudanese father, also treats the subject of being an ethnic minority within a white society. In "Superheld", he talks about how his son doesn't know "black" fictional heroes, and racism. Samy says that he has made the same negative experience his son is now facing. But an increase in self-esteem helped him bear the situation. He finally declares his will to be his son's super hero until he is old enough to tackle the problem the same way Samy did.

== Controversy ==
The title song Dis wo ich herkomm caused controversy due to the following lines:

German

Und wir haben kein’ Nationalstolz, und das alles bloß wegen Adolf -
ja toll, schöne Scheiße, der Typ war doch eigentlich ’n Österreicher.
Ich frag mich, was soll das, als wäre ich Herbert Grönemeyer.
Die Nazizeit hat unsere Zukunft versaut,
die Alten sind frustriert, deshalb badet die Jugend es aus.
Und wir sind es Leid zu leiden, bereit zu zeigen,
wir fangen gerne von vorne an, Schluss mit den alten Zeiten.
Sieh's mal so:
Dies hier ist unser Deutschland.
Dies hier ist euer Deutschland.
Dies ist das Land wo wir leben.
Dies ist das neue Deutschland.

English

And we don't have any national pride, just because of Adolf –
great, what a bummer, the guy was Austrian in fact.
I ask myself what this is all about, as if I were Herbert Grönemeyer.
The Nazi era has butchered our future,
the elderly are frustrated, and the youth has to pay for it.
And we are tired of suffering, and prepared to show,
we commence from the beginning, and end old times.
Look at it that way:
This is our Germany.
This is your Germany.
This is the country we live in.
This is the new Germany.

The first negative review was written by Daniel Erk in the so-called "Hitler-Blog" of German daily newspaper taz. Erk called the lyrics "heavily dimwitted, featherbrained and fatuitous". He furthermore accused the rapper of a lack of knowledge about history. The fact that Hitler was born in Austria, for example, does not change the responsibility of the German nation that supported him and his politics.

In a comment on the website Verbrochenes.net, the editor wrote that Samy Deluxe's "national utopia covered everything from the Green party to the right fringe of the CDU". He added that the rapper was no nazi but sounded like one of them when he sings: "I will prove that I do more for Germany than the government." Even the Süddeutsche Zeitung attacked Samy Deluxe because of his song. The argument for more patriotism is "as feeble-minded as can be".

Samy replied that Erk's accusations were not justified, and that he would have been willing to debate with Erk which he refused to do.

Members of the Antifa group Redical M distributed flyers called Ich diss den Ort, wo ich herkomm! ("I dis the place I come from") to the audience of a Samy Deluxe concert in Göttingen on 11 Mai 2009. Therein, the group denounces Deluxe's way of treating German history. Later on, Samy Deluxe said he did not understand why the activists reproached him with racism, since his band consists of dark-skinned musicians and he is black himself. He further commented that the Antifa only criticized things without giving suggestions to improve the situation in Germany.

== Criticism ==
The way the album was received diverged enormously. The hip hop magazine Juice was not able to reach a unanimous review and thus printed to different opinions called "Battle of the Ear".

== Continuative projects ==
The topics of the album were also treated in a book published in June 2009 by Rowohlt Verlag and called Dis wo ich herkomm: Deutschland Deluxe. He describes his memories of his childhood, his life as a misfit, the beginnings of his career as a musician in Hamburg, the fame resulting therefrom, his view on Germany and young people's problems. The editorial department of Laut.de called Dis wo ich herkomm a "reflected, intelligent, interesting book", whereas other critics said that the content of the book did not surpass the album's.

Furthermore, the organization Crossover e. V. and Samy Deluxe arranged a tour through Germany with the motto "Dis wo ich herkomm – die Deutschlandreise". Young people were able to apply for their participation in order to accompany Deluxe during his travel through the country that lasted two weeks. Deluxe's intention was to "find out more about Germany, to wake cultural interest in the adolescents and to approach people and unknown subjects more openly".

== Track listing ==
No.	Title	Producer(s)	Length
1.	"Intro"	S. Sorge, S. Winkler & F. Olszewski	3:02
2.	"Dis wo ich herkomm (This Is Where I'm From)"	S. Sorge, S. Winkler & F. Olszewski	4:57
3.	"Bis die Sonne rauskommt (Until The Sun Comes Up)"	S. Sorge, K.Powell Jr., St. Baader, R. Pfeffer, S. John, L. Bruckhorst, Ph. Kacza	3:32
4.	"Wer ich bin (Who I Am)"	S. Sorge, S. Winkler, F. Olszewski	4:18
5.	"Wir sind keine Kinder mehr (We're Not Children Anymore)"	S. Sorge, S. Winkler, F. Olszewski	4:41
6.	"Vatertag (Father's Day)"	S. Sorge, S. Winkler, F. Olszewski, J. Bruhns	4:35
7.	"Oma Song (Grandma's Song)"	M. Herre, S.Kawamura	5:27
8.	"Superheld (Superhero)"	S. Sorge, Dead Rabbit	4:03
9.	"Erster (First)"	J. Niemann, K. Wiens	3:07
10.	"Übers Geld (About Money)"	Divine Ruler Period	2:19
11.	"Musik um durch den Tag zu komm (Music To Get Through The Day)"	J. Niemann, K. Wiens	4:37
12.	"Stumm (Xenja) (Mute)"	S. Sorge, S. Winkler, F. Olszewski	3:24
13.	"Sowieso schwer (Hard nonetheless)"	S. Sorge, K.Powell Jr. St.Baader, R. Pfeffer, J. Niemann	3:24
14.	"Blick nach vorn (Looking Ahead)"	S. Sorge, S. Winkler, F. Olszewski	4:02
15.	"Deshalb (Therefore)"	S. Sorge, S. Winkler, F. Olszewski	3:21
16.	"Sprech wie ich sprech (Talk Like I Talk)"	S. Sorge, N. Wülker, J.Dohle	3:28

== See also ==
- Was es ist (MIA.)
