= Gymnasium Lerchenfeld =

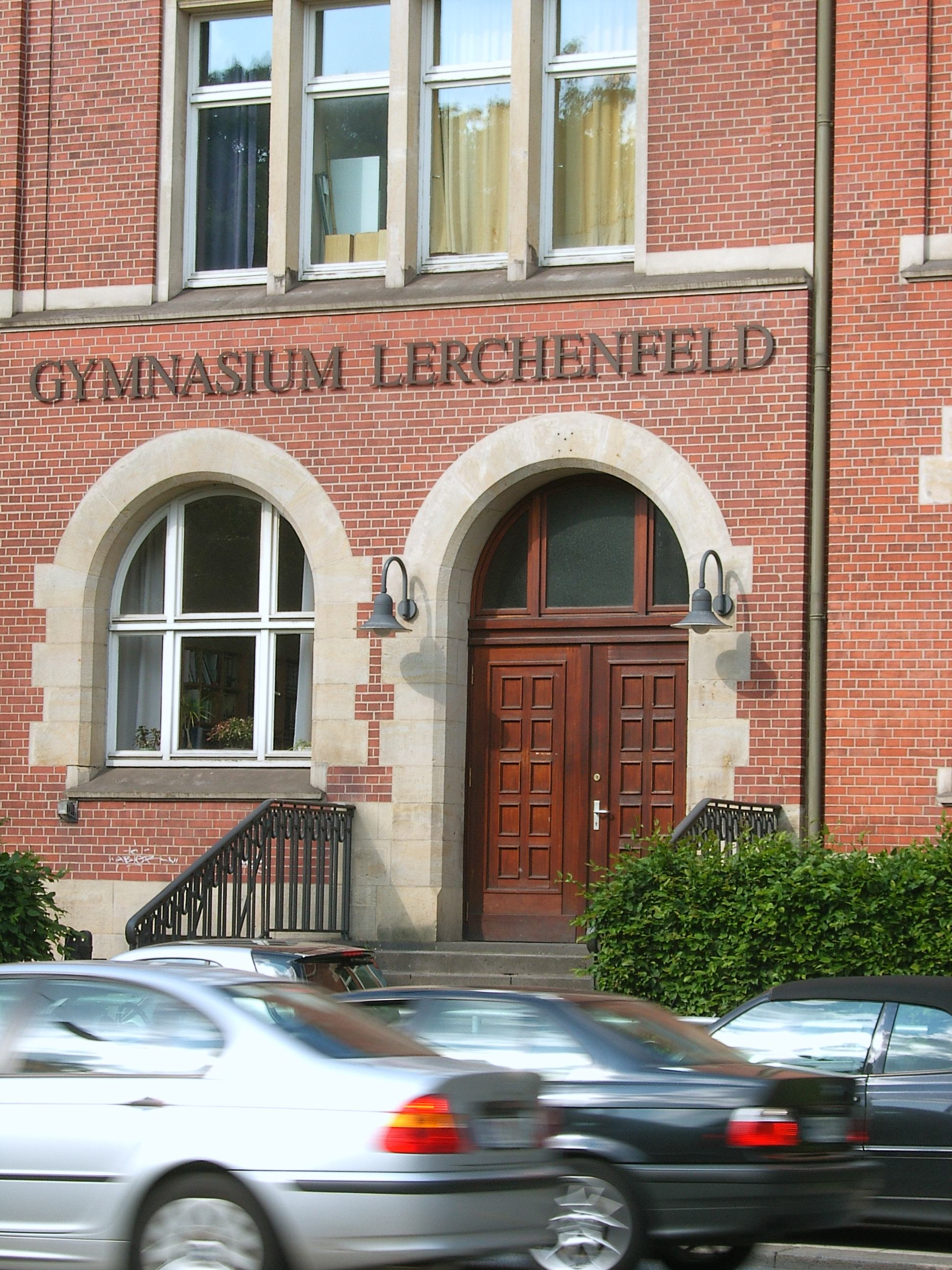
- Main entrance, Gymnasium Lerchenfeld

Location
- Lerchenfeld 10, 22081 Hamburg (Germany)
- Coordinates: 53.56894°N 10.02990°E

Information
- School type: Gymnasium
- Founded: 1910
- Administrator: Ciudad Libre y Hanseática de Hamburgo
- Head of school: Christian Klug
- Faculty: 70
- Enrollment: 875
- Website: gyle.de

Gymnasium Lerchenfeld (GYLE) is a public gymnasium in the city of Hamburg, Germany. It was founded in 1910 as Oberlyzeums für höhere Töchter (girls' school for higher education), and after the passing of the mixed-sex education bill in 1969, it became accessible to boys in 1970. Considered as the first public Gymnasium in the state of Hamburg, Lerchenfeld is known for offering a bilingual program in German and Spanish, being the only bilingual Gymnasium in Northern Germany to offer such a program.

== History and buildings ==
Gymnasium Lerchenfeld was originally a pioneer project of the Hamburg authorities (together with Helena-Lange-Gymnasium) to offer qualitative secondary education for girls.

Its first building was built between 1908 and 1910 by architect Albert Erbe, with a typical Brick-design which included ornaments, Gables, Towers, sandstone-made stairways and other late-gotic elements.

During World War II it was destroyed almost completely during the Hamburg bombings of 1942 and the 1943 Operation Gomorrah (the only remaining parts were the 1921 extension and the Sports Hall).

1955 saw the inauguration of the main building's restored side-wing. In 1961, the school premises extended over parts of Birkenau street and a large portion of an adjacent plot. Four more buildings, including a Multi-purpose and Sports Hall were rebuilt in the following years, with the Erbe's gable-formed corner building shielding the school from the swelling traffic.

The Gymnasium's south-eastern wing watches over the prestigious University of Fine Arts of Hamburg (HFBK).

== Hamburg's geographical centre ==
The schoolyard's most symbolic decorative element is a large old chestnut, considered to be the geographical centre of Hamburg. An alternative calculation for the city's geographical centre refers to the perimeter of the nearby St. Gertrude Church on the Kuhmühlenteich lake, where Christmas concerts of the Lerchenfeld students often take place.

== Spanish-German-English trilingual program ==
In 2007 Gymnasium Lerchenfeld started offering a full Spanish-German-English trilingual education program, originally designed to fill the void and meet the ever-increasing demand from students and parents, especially native speakers and students coming from other bilingual schools. Following a 2016 reform, students with no Spanish background are also admitted to the program, having to go through an intensive schedule during 5th and 6th grade, designed to grant them the ability to take subjects taught in Spanish in the following years, such as Biology, Geography or History.

The program includes student-exchange trips and seminars with a partner school in Murcia, Spain.
