= Buback =

Buback is a German surname. Notable people with the surname include:

- Michael Buback (born 1945), German chemist and professor
- Siegfried Buback (1920–1977), German prosecutor, father of Michael Buback
