= Sjaak =

Sjaak is a given name and a nickname. Notable people with the name include:

- Jacobus Nicolaas Sjaak Brinkkemper (born 1958), Dutch computer scientist, and professor
- Jakob Frederik Sjaak Köhler (1902–1970), Dutch water polo player and swimmer
- Sjaak Lettinga (born 1982), Dutch footballer
- Sjaak Lucassen (born 1961), Dutch long-distance motorcycle rider
- Klaas Pieter Sjaak Pieters (born 1957), Dutch track cyclist
- Sjaak Polak (born 1976), Dutch footballer
- Sjaak Rijke, Dutch national held hostage by Al Qaeda in Mali 2011–2015
- Jesaia Sjaak Swart (born 1938), Dutch footballer
- Jacob Sjaak Troost (born 1959), Dutch footballer
- Sjaak (rapper) (born 1985), Dutch rapper
