= Emmy Beckmann =

Emmy Dora Caroline Beckmann (* 12 April 1880 in Wandsbek; † 24 December 1967 in Hamburg) was a German educator, politician (DDP and FDP) and women's rights activist.

== Professional life and women's rights ==
Beckmann worked as a state-appointed teacher in Hamburg from 1911 onwards. In 1925 she travelled to Washington, D.C. as a Delegate to the International Women's Congress. In 1926 Beckmann was appointed headmistress of the high school Helene-Lange-Oberrealschule. The following year, she became the first woman in Hamburg to be appointed a school inspector (Oberschulrätin).

Like many other democratic figures of the Weimar Republic, Beckmann was removed from office by the Nazis in 1933. Officially, she retired early because of "national unreliability". During the time of National socialism, she withdrew with her twin sister Hanna into Inner Emigration. In 1945, she was reinstated by Heinrich Landahl as a school inspector and played a vital part in the rehabilitation of the Hamburg school system.

Emmy Beckmann campaigned her whole life for the interests of women. Among other things, she was a founding member of the Stadtbund Hamburgischer Frauenvereine in 1915, published the source booklets on women's life in history and was one of the founding members of the Hamburg Frauenring in 1946. At the beginning of 1948, she initiated the re-establishment of the Akademikerinnenbund Hamburg, to which she had already belonged in the Weimar period and which today belongs to the German Women's Academic Society (Deutscher Akademikerinnenbund). Beckmann has headed the latter since its re-establishment in 1949.

After her death in 1967 she was buried at the Ohlsdorf Cemetery (Hamburg). The joint tomb slab for her and her sister is now in the so-called Women's garden.

== Political career ==
In the Weimar period, Emmy Beckmann was a member of the German Democratic Party (DDP, from 1930 onwards: German State Party, germ. Deutsche Staatspartei). She took part in the founding of the Free Democratic Party in 1945, which later became the Hamburg FDP regional association. Internally, she was part of the left wing of the party. In addition to Hans-Harder Biermann-Ratjen, Harald Abatz, Max Dibbern, Anton Leser und Lieselotte Anders, she was one of the signatories of Edgar Engelhard's appeal for a liberal collection (Aufruf für eine liberale Sammlung) on 20 January 1951, which declared itself against the plans of the state associations of North Rhine-Westphalia, Hesse and Lower Saxony to turn the FDP into a party of the national collection.

From 1921 to 1933 and from 1949 to 1957 Beckmann was a member of the Hamburg Parliament. As early as 1946, the British occupying forces wanted to appoint her to the Appointed Parliament (germ. Ernannte Bürgerschaft), but she refused to do so with regard to her occupation as a school inspector. During the deliberations on the new Hamburg Constitution, she requested that the sentence "Women must belong to the Senate" be included in Article 33, but was unsuccessful. Even within her own party, only Emilie Kiep-Altenloh, Lieselotte Anders, Walter Brosius und Hans-Harder Biermann-Ratjen voted in favour of the motion. After the Parliament elections in 1953, she was, alongside Emilie Kiep-Altenloh, nominated by the Hamburg women's associations for one of the Senators positions, but was not voted in. In 1957 she was re-elected as a member of the Hamburg Parliament, but renounced the position on grounds of age. Her parliamentary work focused on education policy. In contrast to Senator Heinrich Landahl and the SPD, she spoke out against the six-year elementary school system and in favour of the 13th grade at secondary school. She argued that six years of secondary school were not enough to prepare for the scientific work at university.

In the first federal election 1949, she ran on third place of the FDP's state list after Hermann Schäfer and Willy Max Rademacher, which did not suffice for an entry into the Bundestag. Beckmann attended the first federal convention as one of Hamburg's representatives.

== Honours ==
In 1953 Beckmann was awarded the Grand Cross of Merit of the Federal Republic of Germany. In 1957, the Senate of Hamburg bestowed the title of professor on her. In addition, she was the first woman ever to be awarded the Mayor Stolten Medal (germ. Bürgermeister-Stolten-Medaille) in 1961. Her and her work are commemorated today in the Ohlsdorf Cemetery in the women's garden. In 1980, the Emmy-Beckmann-Weg in Niendorf was named after her in honour of her work as a politician and women's rights activist.

== Sources ==
- Christine von Oertzen. (2016) Science, Gender, and Internationalism: Women’s Academic Networks, 1917-1955. New York: Palgrave MacMillan, pp. 279–80.
- Irma Hildebrandt. (2003) Immer gegen den Wind. 18 Hamburger Frauenporträts. Kreuzlingen: Diederichs.
- Helmut Stubbe da Luz. (1987) Emmy Beckmann (1880–1967), Hamburgs einflußreichste Frauenrechtlerin. In Zeitschrift des Vereins für Hamburgische Geschichte 73, pp. 97–138.
- Helmut Stubbe da Luz. (1990) Emmy Beckmann: „... dem mütterlichen Prinzip in der Welt wieder Raum geben“. In Mütterlichkeit als Profession? Lebensläufe deutscher Pädagoginnen in der ersten Hälfte dieses Jahrhunderts. Band 1, ed. Ilse Brehmer. Pfaffenweiler: Centaurus, pp. 95–109.
