= Ruhrpott AG =

German hip-hop band

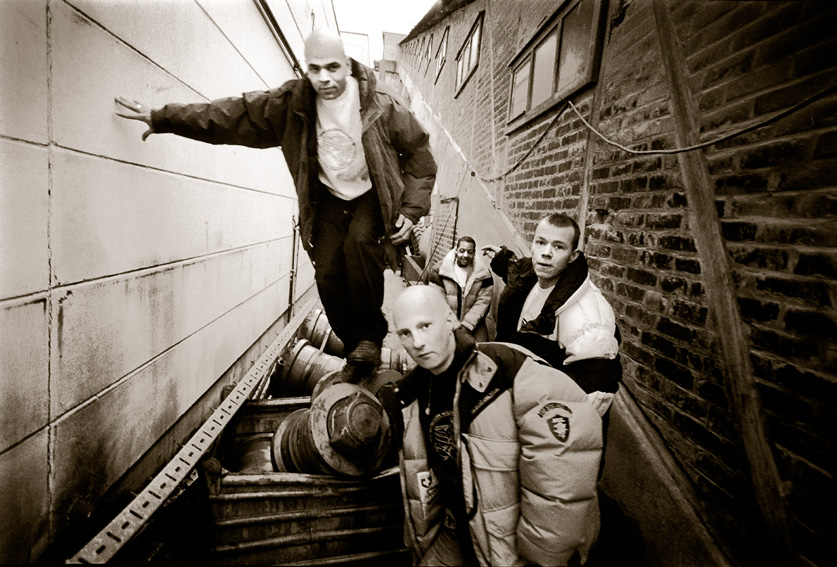
- RAG 1999

Background information
- Also known as: RAG
- Origin: Bochum, Germany
- Genres: German hip hop; conscious hip hop; abstract hip hop
- Years active: 1996–2003, 2018
- Labels: Put Da Needle To Da Records
- Past members: Gabriel Saygbe (Mr. Wiz); Karsten Stieneke (Aphroe); Pahel Schulinus Brunis (Pahel); Michael Galla (Galla) (†2011)

Ruhrpott AG or RAG was a German hip hop group from Bochum. The band was active from 1996 to 2003 and reunited briefly in 2018 for an anniversary concert.

== History ==
RAG first found recognition in the German hip hop scene in 1998, with the album Unter Tage. The second and final album P.O.T.T.E.N.T.I.A.L followed in 2001. RAG's music was characterised by profound, poetical lyrics containing numerous similes, and by relatively restrained, often heavy and melancholic beats.

Ruhrpott is local slang for the heavily industrialised Ruhr Area of northwest Germany, and the abbreviation AG (Aktiengesellschaft) is equivalent to "plc".

=== Formation ===
RAG arose from two earlier (and still active) hip hop collectives in the Ruhr Area: Filo Joes (with the two MCs Pahel and Galla) and Raid (MC Aphroe and DJ Mr. Wiz). Mr. Wiz is from Oberhausen, rather than directly from Bochum, and Aphroe is originally from Herne. Both groups have been active in the hip hop scene since the early 1990s.

Raid and Filo Joes encountered each other at jams and other events – they discovered they were linked by a similar mentality, and decided to make music together under the name "Ruhrpott AG". One of their earliest recordings (although not actually released until it appeared on their second album, P.O.T.T.E.N.T.I.A.L) was the original version of "Tief im Westen": a stream of emotions, associations, similes and metaphors concerning the band's native region, the "Ruhrpott", painting a multi-layered and often contradictory but nevertheless affectionate picture.

After two albums the members of RAG went their separate ways. Pahel and Galla released solo albums on different labels (entitled Natur des Menschen and Swing Kid respectively), while Aphroe, who has stated on his MySpace that there will not be a third RAG album, is also pursuing a solo career.

== Lyrics and music ==
RAG's lyrics and beats, particularly on Unter Tage, conveyed a fairly heavy and melancholic mood, with the band members expressing their feelings about their lives in the Ruhr Area. Their complex use of language, dense with imagery, excurred at times into fantasy. They frequently used metaphors, often relating to their self-knowledge and also their place in the world, for example in the hip hop industry. The second album, P.O.T.T.E.N.T.I.A.L, expanded their range from the early heavy, dreamlike style towards a harder-edged, more concrete lyrical approach in which the storytelling was not always shrouded in indirect imagery.

Examples of this are Nackte Stadt and Pro und Contra (both from the second album). Nackte Stadt is a collage of thoughts and feelings from various city-dwellers, who are all connected by a web of relationships that none of them can see in full. Pro und Contra, another song with a noticeably harder sound than Unter Tage, is a wordplay which builds sentences through the association of words beginning with the syllables “pro” and “kon”.

== Discography ==
=== RAG ===
Studio albums

- 1998: Unter Tage (Put Da Needle To Da Records)
- 2001: P.O.T.T.E.N.T.I.A.L. (Put Da Needle To Da Records/MotorMusic)

Instrumental albums

- 1998: Unter Tage DJ Instrumentals (Put Da Needle To Da Records)

Singles

- 1998: Kopf Stein Pflaster (from Unter Tage)
- 1998: Unter Tage / Kreuzwortfeuer (from Unter Tage)
- 1999: Eiszeit (feat. Roey Marquis II)
- 2000: Nix Is
- 2001: Ragtime (from P.O.T.T.E.N.T.I.A.L.)
- 2001: Pro & Contra (from P.O.T.T.E.N.T.I.A.L.)

=== RAG members ===
Raid

- 1994: Stille Post
- 1999: Geh-Heim-Tipp

Filo Joes

- 1998: Low Budget / Trashtalk

Pahel

- 2003: Natur des Menschen
- 2003: Sahara (feat. Daddy Freddy) (from Natur des Menschen)
- 2004: Seele auf Eis (feat. Lunafrow) (from Natur des Menschen)

Galla

- 2005: Swing Kid

Aphroe

- 2011: Zeit Ist Knapp (from 90)
- 2012: 90
- 2013: 2x45
- 2013: XIII
- 2021: Akribie

== Link ==
Biografie auf laut.de (In German)
