= Jan Delay =

German rapper and singer

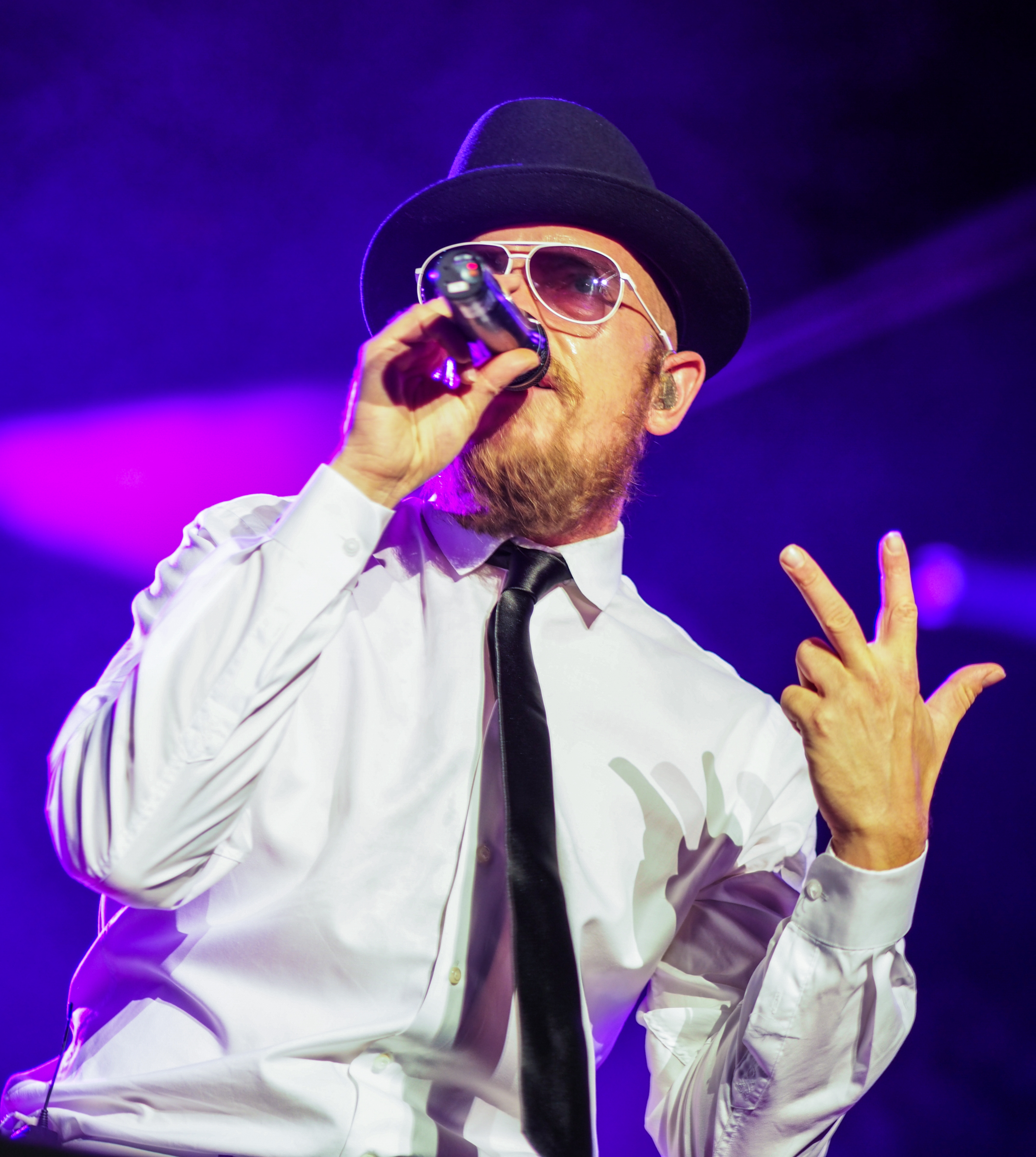
- Delay performing in 2013

Background information
- Also known as: Eißfeldt, Eizi Eiz, Boba Ffett (among others)
- Born: Jan Philipp Eißfeldt; 25 August 1976 (age 49); Hamburg, West Germany
- Genres: German hip hop, reggae, funk
- Occupations: Rapper, singer, songwriter, producer
- Years active: 1991–present
- Labels: Vertigo Berlin
- Member of: Beginner, La Boom
- Website: jandelay.de

Jan Philipp Eißfeldt (born 25 August 1976), known professionally as Jan Delay, is a German rapper and singer whose stylistic range includes mainly hip hop, reggae, dub and funk. An accomplished solo artist, he became known to the public as a member of the German bands Absolute Beginner and La Boom. He performed with his group 'Disko No. 1' at the grand final of the Eurovision Song Contest 2011 in Düsseldorf.

== Early life ==
Delay was born in Hamburg on 25 August 1976. He attended the bilingual Helene-Lange-Gymnasium from 1986 to 1995.

== Career ==
In the 1990s, Delay became known as one third of the pioneering German hip hop group Beginner. His stage name is a reference to Young Deenay, a pop music act in the 90s: the delay/echo is an important effect in reggae and dancehall music.

Delay's most significant trademark is his somewhat nasal voice. He also frequently changes his stage name depending on his current music style, mood and collaboration partners. Bald, he often wears a hat and sunglasses.

=== Eimsbush label ===
In 1997, Delay founded his own record label Eimsbush together with partners from the Hamburg hip-hop scene. The label's main goal was to support and guide fresh underground talents and pave their way into the music business without having them "selling out" to the major labels. The label was initiated by the German hip hop scene while it was going through a boom phase in the mid and late 90s, which led to "every Horst [jerk] being allowed to rap if only he can hold up a mic" (Jan Delay, MTV Germany, 2007). As a result, real talent stepped back for fear of being seen as sellouts by the underground hip-hop scene.

The label was shut down in 2003 due to financial reasons and as a result of the "naive idea of just believing in talent outside the mainstream."

== Discography ==
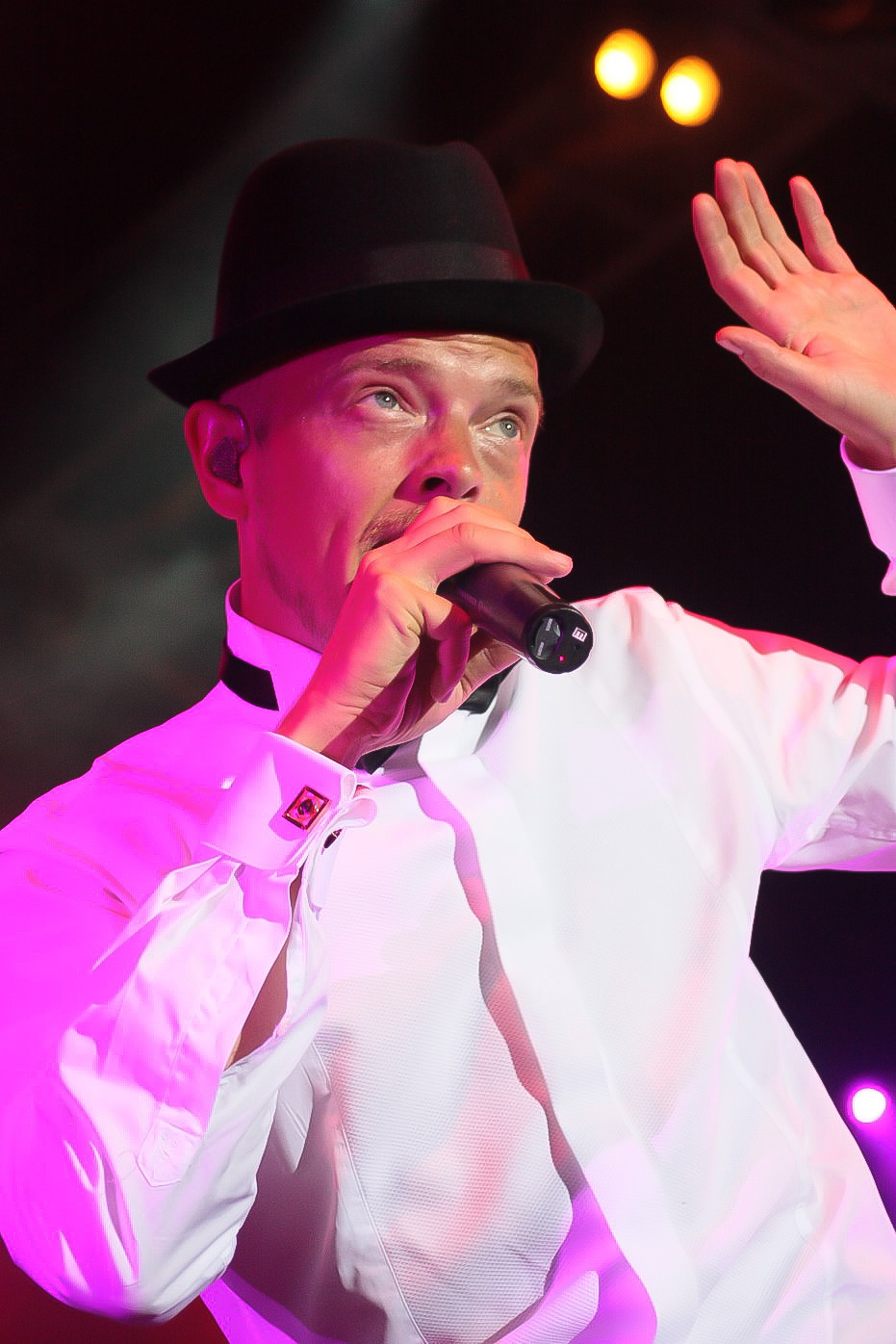
Delay performing in 2009

=== Albums ===
- 2001 – Searching for the Jan Soul Rebels
- 2006 – Mercedes Dance
- 2007 – Searching – the Dubs
- 2007 – Mercedes Dance – Live
- 2009 – Wir Kinder vom Bahnhof Soul (GER: 23rd best-selling album of 2009)
- 2010 – Wir Kinder vom Bahnhof Soul – Live
- 2014 – Hammer & Michel
- 2021 – Earth, Wind & Feiern

=== Singles ===
- 1999 – "Irgendwie, irgendwo, irgendwann" (cover version of Nena's song of the same name)
- 2001 – "Ich möchte nicht, dass ihr meine Lieder singt"
- 2001 – "Vergiftet"
- 2002 – "Die Welt steht still" (Sam Ragga Band featuring Jan Delay)
- 2006 – "Klar"
- 2006 – "Für immer und dich"
- 2007 – "Feuer"
- 2007 – "Im Arsch" (featuring Udo Lindenberg)
- 2007 – "Türlich, Türlich" / Word up
- 2008 – "Ganz anders" (featuring Udo Lindenberg)
- 2009 – "Oh Jonny"
- 2009 – "Disko"
- 2010 – "Hoffnung"
- 2014 – "Liebe"
- 2014 – "St. Pauli"
- 2014 – "Sie kann nicht tanzen"
- 2016 - "Alle Kinder" (Moop Mama featuring Jan Delay)
- 2018 – "Grün-weiße Liebe"
- 2021 – "Intro"
- 2021 – "Eule" (featuring Marteria)
- 2021 – "Spass" (featuring Denyo)
- 2021 – "Kinginmeimding" (featuring Summer Cem)
- 2022 – "Alles gut"
- 2024 – "Siehst du das genau so?"
- 2024 – "Hallo!"

Preceded by Madcon	Eurovision Song Contest; Final Interval act 2011	Succeeded by Emin Agalarov
