= Samy Deluxe =

German rapper (born 1977)

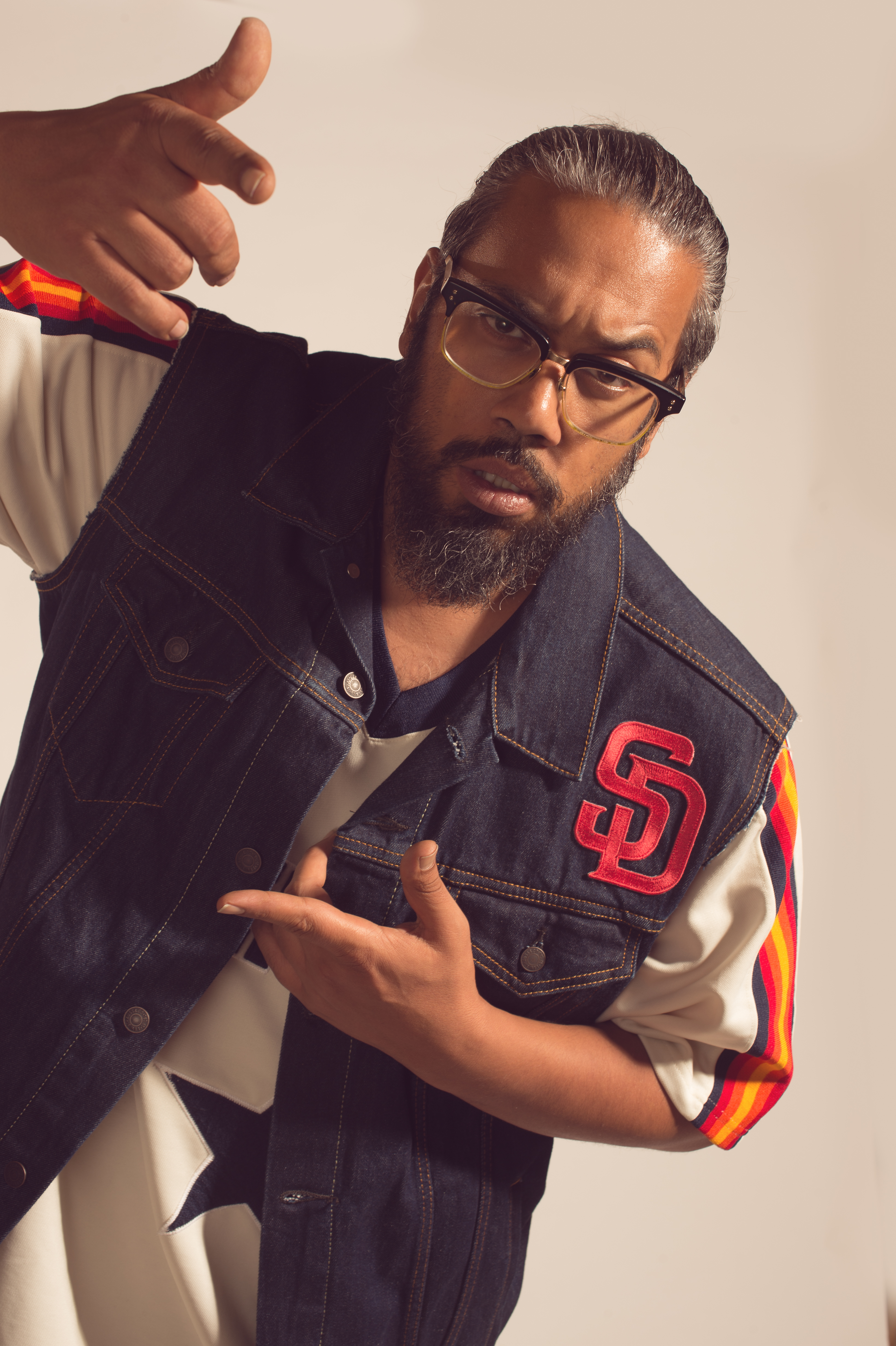
- Samy Deluxe in 2020

Background information
- Also known as: Sam Semilia, Wickeda MC
- Born: Samy Sorge; 19 December 1977 (age 48); Hamburg, West Germany
- Genres: German hip hop
- Occupations: Rapper, record producer
- Years active: 1997–present
- Label: Deluxe Records
- Website: samy-deluxe.de

Samy Sorge (German pronunciation: [ˈzaːmi ˈzɔʁɡə]; born 19 December 1977), commonly known as Samy Deluxe, is a German rapper and record producer from Hamburg.

== Early life ==
Samy was two years old when his Sudanese father left Germany. Samy grew up with his mother's family. His half-sister was born shortly after his father left. The family lived in Barmbek for many years, then moved to Eppendorf, a better-off part of Hamburg. His family was able to make the move upon the recommendation of a family friend after his mother remarried. He attended the Wolfgang-Borchert-Schule and attained the Realschulabschluss, or certificate of general education similar to a British GCSE. He cites his upbringing in a middle-class neighbourhood as part of his inspiration. He says he felt out of place: "At (one) point I would stand out in front of my own house and people who lived here before me would ask, 'Can I help you?'". Additionally, he cites American rappers as his inspiration rather than their German counterparts. Samy recalls that his interest in rap music began as early as 1988.

== Music career ==
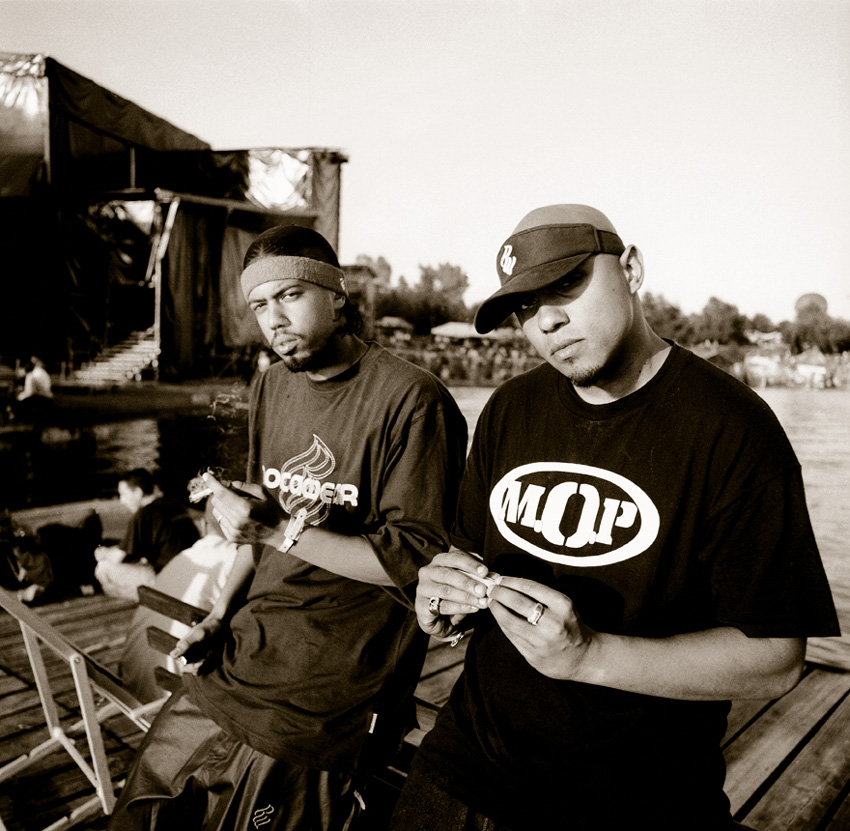
Samy Deluxe (left) with rapper D-Flame, 2000

In 2001, Samy Deluxe released his self-titled debut album, which ranked No. 2 in the German Album Charts for the 19th calendar week of 2001. The first single from the album, "Hab' gehört...", ranked No. 26. However, the second single, "Internetional Love", failed to enter the charts. The final single, "Weck mich auf", peaked at No. 4 in Germany, becoming a national hit and the album's most successful single. Following the success of his solo debut, Samy Deluxe became a highly acclaimed hip hop artist in German rap and internationally.

In 2003, Samy Deluxe founded the rap duo ASD with fellow rapper Afrob. They released their debut Wer hätte das gedacht. The lead single from the album, "Sneak Preview", ranked successfully on the German charts. Most of the beats on this album came from American producers, including J Dilla, Diamond D and Waajeed.

In August 2004, Samy Deluxe released his second solo album, Verdammtnochma!. The album peaked at No. 2 on the German album-charts shortly thereafter and stayed for three weeks in the Top 10. In the same year, he was featured on the German remix of "Dip It Low" by American singer Christina Milian, which was a commercial success.

In 2005, Samy Deluxe represented Hamburg in the Bundesvision Song Contest 2005, with the song "Generation", placing ninth with 44 points.

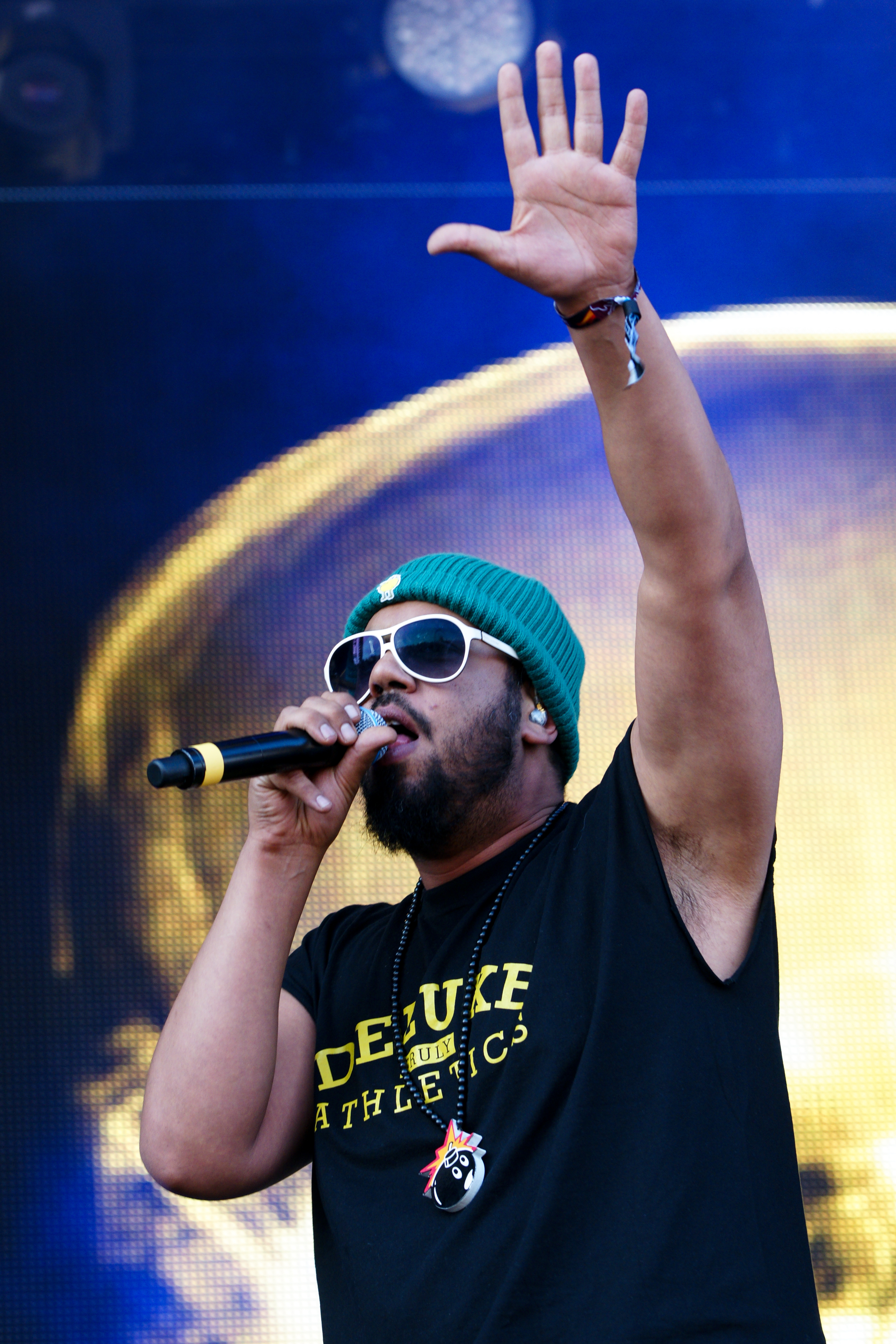
Samy Deluxe performing in 2014

In April 2016, Samy Deluxe released his sixth solo album, Berühmte letzte Worte (Famous last words). The album peaked at No. 4 on the German album-charts. In the same month, he joined Xavier Naidoo to perform one of the new tracks, Haus am Mehr (House by the ocean, but written as wordplay for "more" instead of "Meer"), in the TV show Sing meinen Song (Sing my song). Features on the album came from Nena, Afrob, Max Herre and many others.

In May 2019, Samy Deluxe appeared on MTV unplugged with Max Raabe.

== Business ventures ==
In 2006, Samy Deluxe, in collaboration with Reebok, designed sneakers and a cap with New Era Cap Company. On the cover of his mixtape Deluxe von Kopf bis Fuß, he wore clothes, especially designed for him. In 2007 followed two more sneakers, so that four Reebok sneakers were developed for the Samy Deluxe series.

== Discography ==
=== Studio albums ===
- 2001: Samy Deluxe
- 2004: Verdammtnochma!
- 2009: Dis wo ich herkomm
- 2011: SchwarzWeiss
- 2012: Verschwörungstheorien mit schönen Melodien (as Herr Sorge)
- 2014: Männlich
- 2016: Berühmte letzte Worte
- 2017: Deluxe Edition (EP)
- 2019: Hochkultur
- 2023: Hochkultur 2

=== Live albums ===
- 2018: SaMTV Unplugged

=== Collaboration ===
- 2000: Deluxe Soundsystem (with Dynamite Deluxe)
- 2003: Wer hätte das Gedacht? (with Afrob)
- 2008: TNT (with Dynamite Deluxe)
- 2015: Blockbasta (with Afrob)
- 2025: SAMY x CONDUCTOR (with Conductor Williams)

== Awards ==
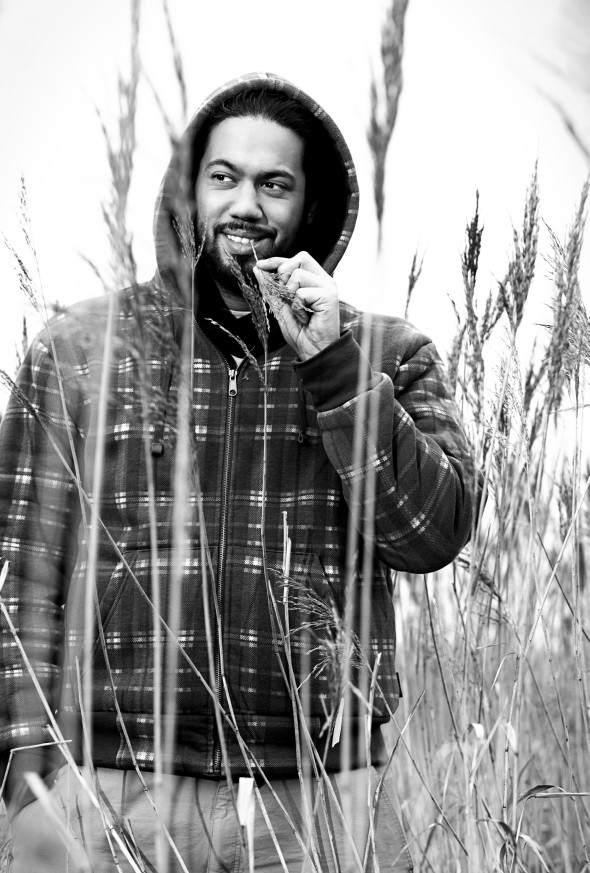
Samy Deluxe in 2009

- 2001: Comet in the category Hip Hop National
- 2001: MTV Europe Music Award as best German artist
- 2001: Bravo Otto in Gold in the category HipHop National
- 2002: Gold for the album Samy Deluxe
- 2002: ECHO in the category Hip-Hop/R&B National
- 2004: Bravo Otto in Bronze in the category HipHop National
- 2005: Bravo Otto in Bronze in the category HipHop National
- 2006: Hip Hop.de Award in the category best Mixtape for Big Baus of the Nauf
- 2007: Jam FM Rapublik Award Platz 1 in the category best Label

== Literary works ==
- Dis wo ich herkomm: Deutschland Deluxe, published by Rowohlt Taschenbuch Verlag, June 2009 ISBN 978-3-499-62542-8
