= Dynamite Deluxe =

- Genres: German hip hop, Rap
- Years active: 1997 - 2008
- Labels: Eimsbush, EMI
- Members: Samy Deluxe; Tropf; DJ Dynamite
- Website: http://www.dynamite-deluxe.de/

Dynamite Deluxe is a German hip hop group hailing from Hamburg, consisting of the MC Samy Deluxe, producer Tropf and producer/DJ Dynamite (alias Joni Rewind).

In 1997, the trio released their first mixtape "Dynamite Deluxe Demo", which was an 8-track EP produced in a very small amount.

Although Samy Deluxe left the group in early 2001.

== Discography ==
=== Albums ===
- 2000: Deluxe Soundsystem (CD/LP)
- 2008: TNT

=== Singles, 12inches & EPs ===
- 1997: "Dynamite Deluxe Demo" (MC)
- 1997: "monkey"
- 1998: "Ultimative Freestyletape" with Das Bo (MC)
- 1998: "Pures Gift" ("Pure Poison")
- 1998: "Deluxe Beats" (Instrumental)
- 1999: "Samy Deluxe" / "MCees"
- 1999: "The Classic Vinyl Files" (CD)
- 2000: "Grüne Brille" (CD) ("Green Glasses")
- 2000: "Ladies & Gentlemen" (CD)
- 2000: "Wie jetzt" (CD) ("How now")
- 2008: "Dynamit!" (CD)
- 2008: "Alles bleibt anders" (CD) ("Everything stays different")

=== Other ===
- 2007: Boombox (Videosingle, Internet Exclusive)
