= History of self-driving cars =

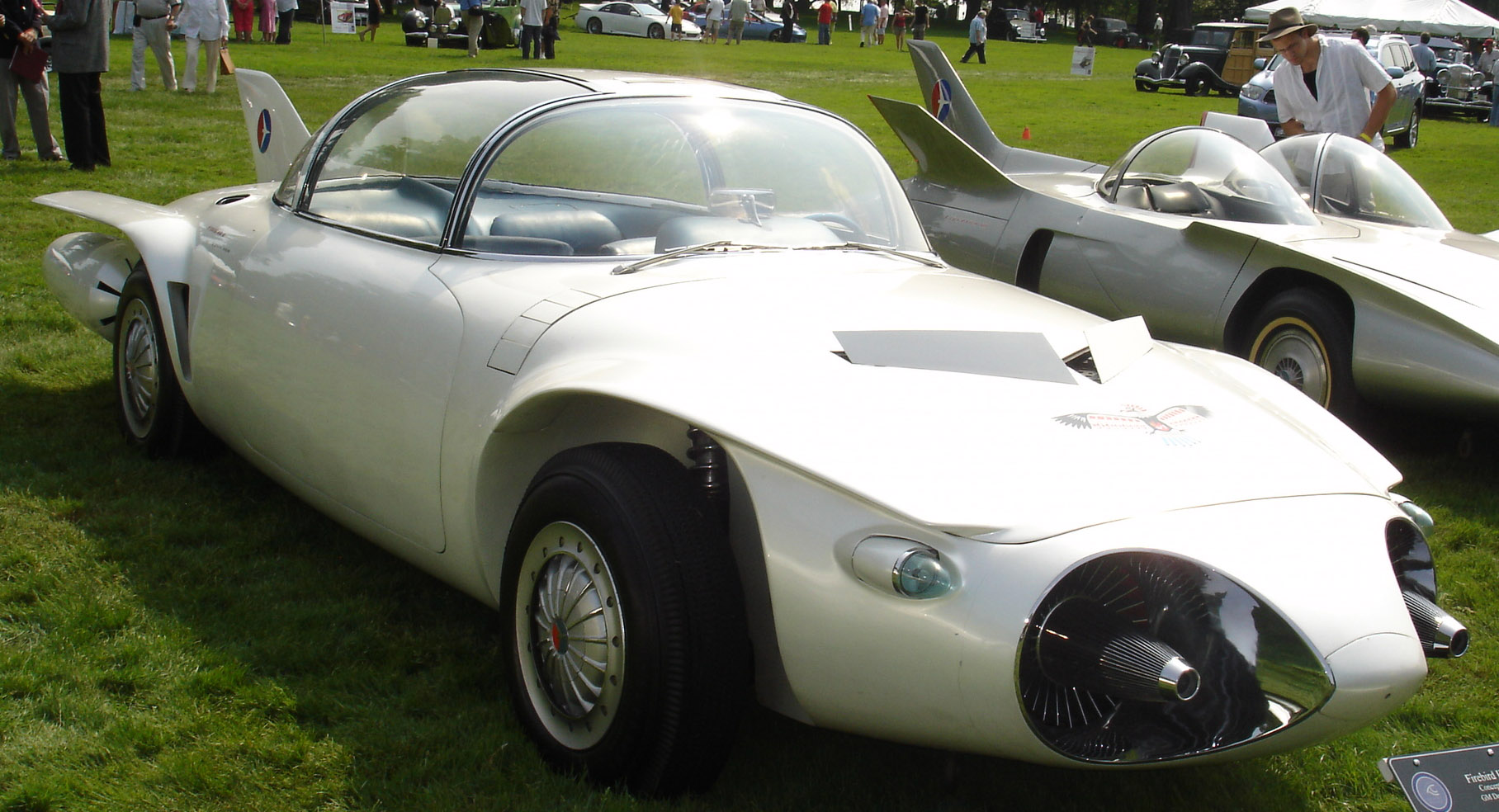
General Motors' Firebird II was described as having a "brain" that allowed it to move into a lane with a metal rod and follow it along.

Self-driving cars were anticipated by experiments in radio control during the 1920s, and the development of advanced driver assistance (ADAS) after WWII. Trials of self-driving vehicles began in the 1950s with the first semi-autonomous car developed in 1977 by Japan's Tsukuba Mechanical Engineering Laboratory.

In the United States, Carnegie Mellon University's Navlab began semi-autonomous vehicle projects in 1984, funded by the Defense Advanced Research Projects Agency (DARPA). In Europe, similar projects were led by Mercedes-Benz and the University of the Bundeswehr Munich's EUREKA Prometheus Project, beginning in 1987.

The United States allocated US$650 million in 1991 for research on the National Automated Highway System, which demonstrated automated driving combining highway-embedded automation with vehicle technology. Until the second DARPA Grand Challenge in 2005, automated vehicle research in the United States was primarily funded by DARPA, the US Army and the US Navy, producing incremental advances in speed, driving competence, control, and sensor systems.

Since then, numerous private companies and both private and public research organizations around the world have developed working autonomous vehicles. In 2015, the Cruise subsidiary of General Motors began road testing in California. Two years later, Waymo was the first to commercialize a robotaxi service in Phoenix, Arizona, followed by a similar service by DeepRoute.ai in Shenzhen. Cruise later shut down in 2024, with several other manufacturers scaling back plans for self-driving technology in 2022, including Ford and Volkswagen due to misgivings about commercial viability.

Legal and regulatory developments to accommodate the testing and facilitation of self-driving vehicles have also taken place worldwide. In the 2010s and 2020s, some UNECE and EU members developed rules and regulations related to automated vehicles, with various cities planning to operate transport systems for driverless cars and to allow testing of robotic cars in traffic. In 2016, the US National Economic Council and US Department of Transportation (USDOT) released the Federal Automated Vehicles Policy. The first known fatal accident involving a vehicle being driven by itself took place in Williston, Florida, in 2016, while the first reported pedestrian killed by a self-driving car was in 2018.

From the 2010s, increasingly rapid progress in research and development has taken place, often accompanied by inaccurate predictions of complete autonomy, which capability is so far confined to driverless taxi services in designated cities. As of early 2024, several manufacturers sell cars with automated driving systems in the US, Japan, Europe, and China.

== History ==
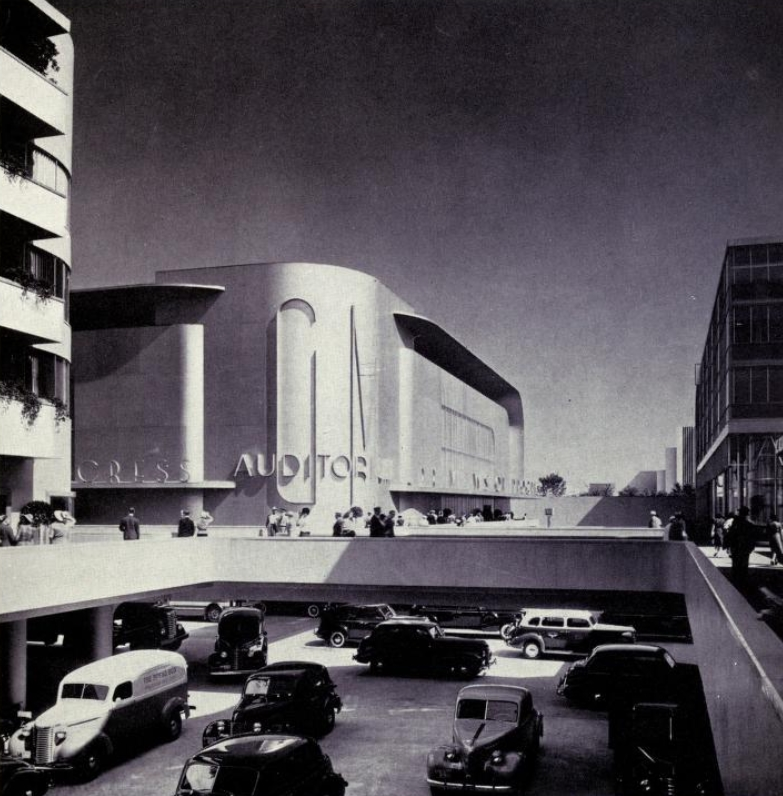
A street intersection in the City of the Future; detail of the Futurama exhibit at the 1939 New York World's Fair

=== 1920s ===
In July 1925, Houdina Radio Control first demonstrated the radio-controlled "American Wonder" on New York City streets. The car was a 1926 Chandler that was equipped with a transmitting antenna on the tonneau and was operated by a person in another car that followed it. The radio-controlled car "barely missed trucks, automobiles, and a milk wagon, finally crashing into a sedan." In January 1927, after namesake Houdina reportedly left Indianapolis without paying some of his workers, a story was circulated that the "radio control" was actually being done by a person hidden in the car.

Reports of demonstrations of a "phantom motor car" or "phantom auto" in December 1926 in Milwaukee, Wisconsin, and in June 1932 in Fredericksburg, Virginia, do not mention Houdina (the person or the company), although the described capabilities of the car were consistent with the Houdina vehicle.

=== 1930s ===
An early depiction of automated guided cars was Norman Bel Geddes's Futurama exhibit sponsored by General Motors at the 1939 World's Fair, which showed radio-controlled electric cars propelled by electromagnetic fields generated by circuits embedded in the roadway.

Bel Geddes later outlined his vision in his book Magic Motorways (1940), promoting advances in highway design and transportation, foreshadowing the Interstate Highway System, and arguing that humans should be removed from the process of driving. Bel Geddes predicted that these advances would be a reality in 1960.

=== 1940s ===
Development of advanced driver assistance systems (ADAS) began after WWII, with the first such system being cruise control, invented in 1948. Subsequent technologies such as Forward Collision Warning (FCW) and Lane Departure Warning (LDW) formed part of the definition of self-driving vehicles in later years.

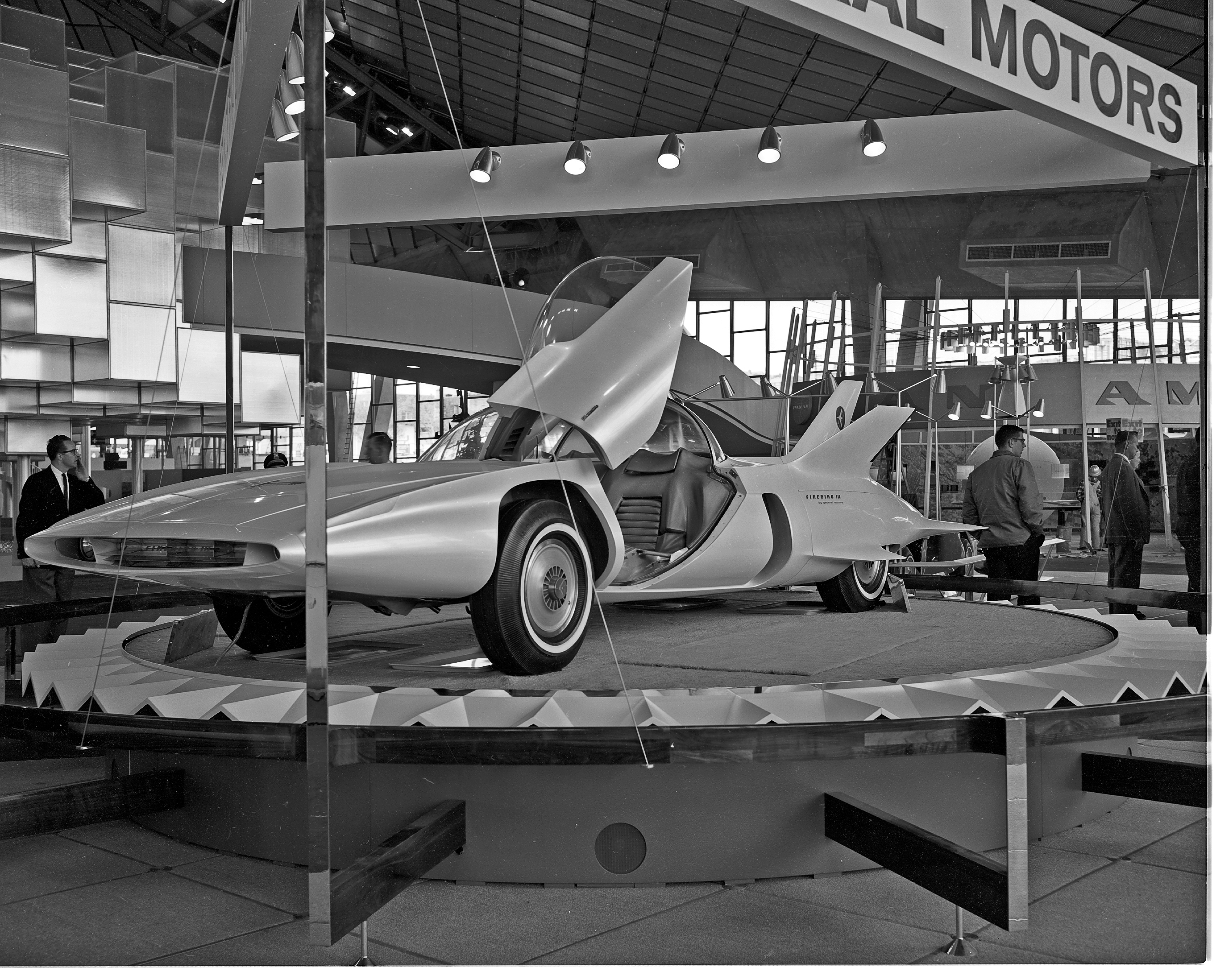
General Motors' Firebird III on display at the Century 21 Exposition, Seattle, 1962

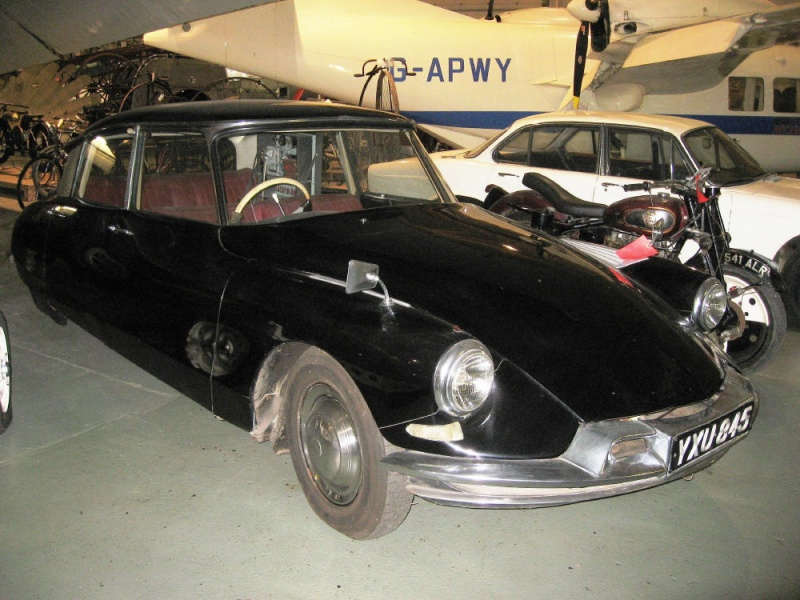
The RRL's modified 1960 Citroen DS19 to be automatically controlled at the Science Museum, London

=== 1950s ===
In 1953, RCA Labs successfully created a system with a miniature car guided and controlled by wires laid in a pattern on a laboratory floor. The system sparked the imagination of Leland M. Hancock, traffic engineer in the Nebraska Department of Roads, and of his director, L. N. Ress, state engineer. The decision was made to experiment with the system in actual highway installations.

In 1957, a full-size system was successfully demonstrated by RCA Labs and the State of Nebraska on a 400-foot strip of public highway at the intersection of U.S. Route 77 and Nebraska Highway 2, then just outside Lincoln, Nebraska. A series of experimental detector circuits buried in the pavement was paired with a series of lights along the road's edge. The detector circuits were able to send impulses to guide the car and determine the presence and velocity of any metallic vehicle on its surface. A previous test installation of the system in September 1954 along U.S. Route 73 and U.S. Route 75 in Cass County, Nebraska, was utilized as an experimental traffic counter. It was developed in collaboration with General Motors, who provided two standard car models with equipment consisting of special radio receivers and audible and visual warning devices that were able to simulate automatic steering, acceleration, and brake control.

It was further demonstrated on 5 June 1960, at RCA Lab's headquarters in Princeton, New Jersey, where reporters were allowed to "drive" the cars. Commercialization of the system was expected to happen by 1975.

In addition, during the 1950s and throughout the 1960s, General Motors showcased its Firebirds, a series of experimental cars that were described as having an "electronic guide system [that] can rush it over an automatic highway while the driver relaxes."

Radar Assistance Systems, also with emergency brake functionality, were introduced in concept cars by major companies in the 1950s. Ford had Radar in the FX Atomos concept car with visualized information on a "Roadarscope". In 1959, GM demonstrated the brake assist in a Cadillac Cyclone.

=== 1960s ===
In 1960, Ohio State University's Communication and Control Systems Laboratory launched a project to develop driverless cars that were activated by electronic devices embedded in the roadway. Head of the project, Dr. Robert L. Cosgriff, claimed in 1966 that the system could be ready for installation on a public road in 15 years.

In the early 1960s, the Bureau of Public Roads considered the construction of an experimental electronically controlled highway. Four states – Ohio, Massachusetts, New York, and California – were bidding for the construction. In August 1961, Popular Science reported on the Aeromobile 35B, an air-cushion vehicle (ACV) that was invented by William Bertelsen and was envisioned to revolutionize the transportation system, with personal self-driving hovering cars that could speed up to 150 miles per hour (240 km/h).

During the 1960s, the United Kingdom's Transport and Road Research Laboratory tested a driverless Citroen DS that interacted with magnetic cables that were embedded in the road. It went through a test track at 80 miles per hour (130 km/h) without deviation of speed or direction in any weather conditions, and in a far more effective way than by human control.

=== 1970s ===
Research continued in the 1970s with cruise control devices activated by signals in the cabling beneath the tracks. According to cost-benefit analyses that were made, adoption of system on the British motorways would be repaid by end of the century, increase the road capacity by at least 50% and prevent around 40% of the accidents. Funding for these experiments was withdrawn by the mid-1970s.

Also, during the 1960s and the 1970s, Bendix Corporation developed and tested driverless cars that were powered and controlled by buried cables, with wayside communicators relaying computer messages. Stanford University demonstrated its Artificial Intelligence Laboratory Cart, a small wheeled robot that once accidentally navigated onto a nearby road.

Preliminary research into the intelligent automated logic required for autonomous cars was conducted at the Coordinated Science Laboratory of the University of Illinois Urbana-Champaign in the early to mid-1970s.

In 1977, the first self-driving car that operated independently of wires under the road was designed by the Japanese Tsukuba Mechanical Engineering Laboratory. It travelled at speeds up to 30 km/h (19 mph) and used two video cameras to visually detect street markings.

=== 1980s ===
In the 1980s, a vision-guided Mercedes-Benz robotic van, designed by Ernst Dickmanns and his team at Munich's University of the Bundeswehr Munich in Germany, achieved a speed of 59.6 miles per hour (95.9 km/h) on streets without traffic. Subsequently, intergovernmental organisation Eureka conducted the €749,000,000 Prometheus Project on autonomous vehicles from 1987 to 1995.

In the same decade, the DARPA-funded Autonomous Land Vehicle (ALV) project in the United States made use of new technologies developed by the University of Maryland, Carnegie Mellon University, the Environmental Research Institute of Michigan, Martin Marietta, and SRI International. The ALVINN (An Autonomous Land Vehicle in a Neural Network) project achieved the first road-following demonstration that used lidar, computer vision, and autonomous robotic control to direct a robotic vehicle at speeds of up to 19 miles per hour (31 km/h).

In 1987, HRL Laboratories (formerly Hughes Research Labs) demonstrated the first off-road map and sensor-based autonomous navigation on the ALV. The vehicle traveled over 2,000 feet (610 m) at 1.9 miles per hour (3.1 km/h) on complex terrain with steep slopes, ravines, large rocks, and vegetation. By 1989, the Navlab of Carnegie Mellon University had pioneered the use of neural networks to steer and otherwise control autonomous vehicles, forming the basis of contemporary control strategies.

=== 1990s ===
In 1991, the United States Congress passed the ISTEA Transportation Authorization bill, which instructed the United States Department of Transportation (USDOT) to "demonstrate an automated vehicle and highway system by 1997." The Federal Highway Administration took on this task, first with a series of Precursor Systems Analyses and then by establishing the National Automated Highway System Consortium (NAHSC). This cost-shared project was led by Federal Highways Administration and General Motors, with Caltrans, Delco, Parsons Brinkerhoff, Bechtel, UC-Berkeley, Carnegie Mellon University, and Lockheed Martin as additional partners. Extensive systems engineering work and research culminated in Demo '97 on I-15 in San Diego, California, in which about 20 automated vehicles, including cars, buses, and trucks, were demonstrated to thousands of onlookers, attracting extensive media coverage. The demonstrations involved close-headway platooning intended to operate in segregated traffic, as well as "free agent" vehicles intended to operate in mixed traffic. Other carmakers were invited to demonstrate their systems, such that Toyota and Honda also participated. While the subsequent aim was to produce a system design to aid commercialization, the program was canceled in the late 1990s due to tightening research budgets at USDOT. Overall funding for the program was in the range of $90 million.

In June 1993, professor Han Min-Hong in South Korea worked on a self-driving car. He used an Asia Motors to test his car by having it drive around Seoul, accumulating a total of 17 kilometers travelled. Two years later, in 1995, a different car was tested by driving from Seoul to Busan via the Gyeongbu Highway. As his work was ahead of its time in South Korea, the government focused on heavy industry like steel and shipbuilding at the time. As a result, government funding for his research was cut at Korea University for his project. The consequences of this resulted in the termination of the self-driving car development in South Korea. "It was born too early." "The technology couldn't catch up with the era." "Even if we entered the era a bit late, we could have become an Elon Musk of Korea." "It was the wrong era." These were some of the words that were spoken by Korean Netizens, who expressed disappointment about the cancellation of the program years later."

In 1994, the twin robot vehicles VaMP and Vita-2 of Daimler-Benz and Ernst Dickmanns of UniBwM drove more than 620 miles (1,000 km) on a Paris three-lane highway in standard heavy traffic at speeds up to 81 miles per hour (130 km/h), albeit semi-autonomously with human interventions. They demonstrated autonomous driving in free lanes, convoy driving, and lane changes with autonomous passing of other cars. That same year, Lucas Industries developed parts for a semi-autonomous car in a project that was funded by Jaguar Cars, Lucas, and the UK Department of Trade and Industry.

In 1995, Carnegie Mellon University's Navlab 5 project completed a 3,100 miles (5,000 km) cross-country journey, dubbed "No Hands Across America", traveling from Pittsburgh, Pennsylvania and San Diego, California, of which 98.2% (all but 50 of the 2850 miles) was autonomously controlled. It completed the trip at an average speed of 59.6 mph (95.9 km/h). This car, however, was semi-autonomous by nature: it used neural networks to control the steering wheel, but throttle and brakes were human-controlled, chiefly for safety reasons.

Also in 1995, Dickmanns' re-engineered autonomous S-Class Mercedes-Benz undertook a 990 miles (1,590 km) journey from Munich in Bavaria, Germany to Copenhagen, Denmark and back, using saccadic computer vision and transputers to react in real-time. The robot achieved speeds exceeding 109 miles per hour (175 km/h) on the German Autobahn, with a mean time between human interventions of 5.6 miles (9.0 km), or 95% autonomous driving. It drove in traffic, executing manoeuvres to pass other cars. Despite being a research system without emphasis on long-distance reliability, it drove up to 98 miles (158 km) without human intervention.

In 1996, (now Professor) Alberto Broggi of the University of Parma launched the ARGO Project, which worked on enabling a modified Lancia Thema to follow the normal (painted) lane marks on an unmodified highway. The culmination of the project was a journey of 1,200 miles (1,900 km) over six days on the motorways of northern Italy dubbed Mille Miglia in Automatico ("One thousand automatic miles"), with an average speed of 56 miles per hour (90 km/h). The car operated in fully automatic mode for 94% of its journey, with the longest automatic stretch being 34 miles (55 km). The vehicle had only two black-and-white low-cost video cameras on board and used stereoscopic vision algorithms to understand its environment.

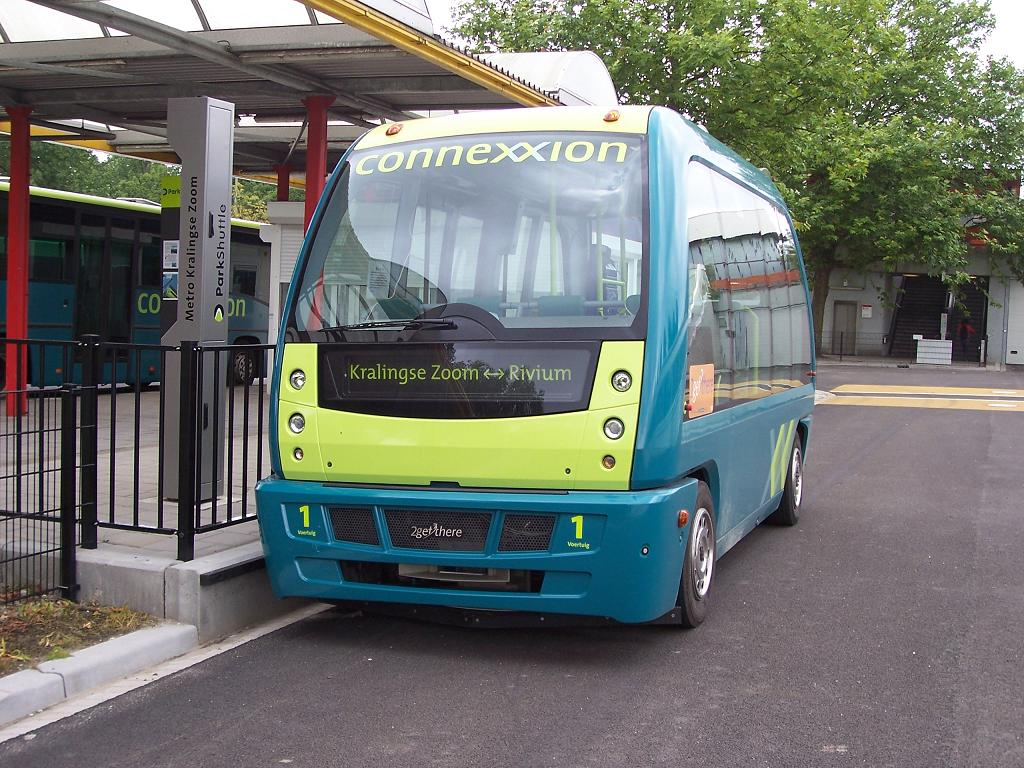
The ParkShuttle at the Netherlands in August 2005

The ParkShuttle, billed as the world's first driverless vehicle, is an automated people mover which uses artificial reference points (magnets) embedded in the road surface to verify its position. Two pilot projects were started in the Netherlands, at Schiphol Airport (December 1997) and the business park Rivium (1999). Both carried members of the general public and, as such, claim a stake in the title to the first driverless vehicles. The vehicles are autonomous, do not feature a steering wheel or pedals, nor do they have a safety driver or steward on board. They drive at grade, on a dedicated lane which does feature intersections with pedestrians, bicyclists, and cars.

In 1998, Willie Jones states that many automakers consider autonomous technology as part of their research yearly. He notes, "In May 1998, Toyota became the first to introduce an Adaptive Cruise Control (ACC) system on a production vehicle when it unveiled a laser-based system for its Progres compact luxury sedan, which it sold in Japan."

=== 2000s ===
The US Government funded three military efforts known as Demo I (US Army), Demo II (DARPA), and Demo III (United States Army). Demo III (2001) demonstrated the ability of unmanned ground vehicles to navigate miles of difficult off-road terrain, avoiding obstacles such as rocks and trees. James Albus at the National Institute of Standards and Technology provided the Real-Time Control System, which is a hierarchical control system. Not only were individual vehicles controlled (e.g., throttle, steering, and brake), but groups of vehicles had their movements automatically coordinated in response to high-level goals.

In the first Grand Challenge held in March 2004, DARPA (the Defense Advanced Research Projects Agency) offered a $1 million prize to any team of robotic engineers that could create an autonomous car capable of finishing a 150-mile course in the Mojave Desert. No team was successful in completing the course.

In October 2005, the second DARPA Grand Challenge was again held in a desert environment. GPS points were placed, and obstacle types were located in advance. This year, five vehicles completed the course. David Hall of Velodyne competed in the event with a prototype lidar sensor, which he then manufactured with Velodyne Lidar. Lidar quickly became an integral sensor for self-driving vehicles, and five out of six of the vehicles that finished the 2007 DARPA Urban Challenge used Velodyne's product.

In January 2006, the United Kingdom's 'Foresight' think-tank revealed a report which predicts RFID-tagged driverless cars on the UK's roads by 2056 and the Royal Academy of Engineering, claimed that driverless trucks could be on Britain's motorways by 2019.

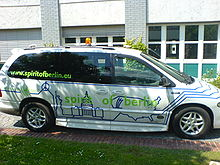
Spirit of Berlin at Berlin, Germany in May 2007

In November 2007, DARPA again sponsored Grand Challenge III, but this time the Challenge was held in an urban environment. In this race, a 2007 Chevy Tahoe autonomous car from Carnegie Mellon University earned the 1st place. Prize competitions as DARPA Grand Challenges offered students and researchers an opportunity to research a project on autonomous cars to reduce the burden of transportation problems, including traffic congestion and traffic accidents, which present an increasing challenge for the majority of urban residents.

Autonomous vehicles have also been used in mining. In December 2008, Rio Tinto Alcan began testing the Komatsu Autonomous Haulage System – the world's first commercial autonomous mining haulage system – in the Pilbara iron ore mine in Western Australia. Rio Tinto has reported benefits in health, safety, and productivity. In November 2011, Rio Tinto signed a deal to greatly expand its fleet of driverless trucks.

Google began developing its self-driving cars in 2009, but did so privately, avoiding public announcement of the program until a later time.

=== 2010s ===
Many major automotive manufacturers, including General Motors, Ford, Mercedes-Benz, Volkswagen, Audi, Nissan, Toyota, BMW, and Volvo, and Bosch were in the process of testing driverless car systems. BMW has been testing driverless systems since around 2005, and in 2010, Audi sent a driverless Audi TTS to the top of Pike’s Peak at close to race speeds.

Research and development in this decade also led to a number of predictions as to when commercially available fully self-driving cars would finally emerge. Along with the beginning of a long series of predictions by Tesla starting in 2013, in 2016 BMW partnered with Intel and Mobileye with the goal of bringing a "highly and fully automated" car to market by 2021, a goal which to date remains unfulfilled. In 2017, then-CEO Mark Fields said Ford would have a Level 4 self-driving vehicle with no steering wheel or pedals in commercial operation by 2021. Four years later, Ford admitted the company had overestimated the arrival of autonomous vehicles. Also in 2017, Volvo launched the "Drive Me" project with a goal of putting 100 self-driving cars on Swedish roads for "ordinary families". This was later delayed and scaled back to a more limited research project.

==== 2010 ====
In 2010, Italy's VisLab from the University of Parma, led by Professor Alberto Broggi, ran the VisLab Intercontinental Autonomous Challenge (VIAC), a 9,900-mile (15,900 km) test run which marked the first intercontinental land journey completed by autonomous vehicles. Four electric vans made a 100-day journey, leaving Parma, Italy, on 20 July 2010, and arriving at the Shanghai Expo in China on 28 October. The vehicles required human intervention a few times to navigate a traffic jam and toll booths. The research project is co-funded by the European Union CORDIS program.

In 2010, the Institute of Control Engineering of the Technische Universität Braunschweig demonstrated the first car licensed for autonomous driving on the streets and highways in Germany.

In October 2010, an attorney for the California Department of Motor Vehicles raised concerns that "[t]he technology is ahead of the law in many areas", citing state laws that "all presume to have a human being operating the vehicle."

==== 2011 ====
In 2011, the Free University of Berlin developed two autonomous cars to drive in the inner city traffic of Berlin. Led by the AutoNOMOS group, the two vehicles, Spirit of Berlin and MadeInGermany, handled intercity traffic, traffic lights, and roundabouts between the Internationales Congress Centrum Berlin and the Brandenburg Gate. It was financed by the German Federal Ministry of Education and Research.

In 2011, General Motors created the EN-V (short for Electric Networked Vehicle), an autonomous electric urban vehicle.

==== 2012 ====
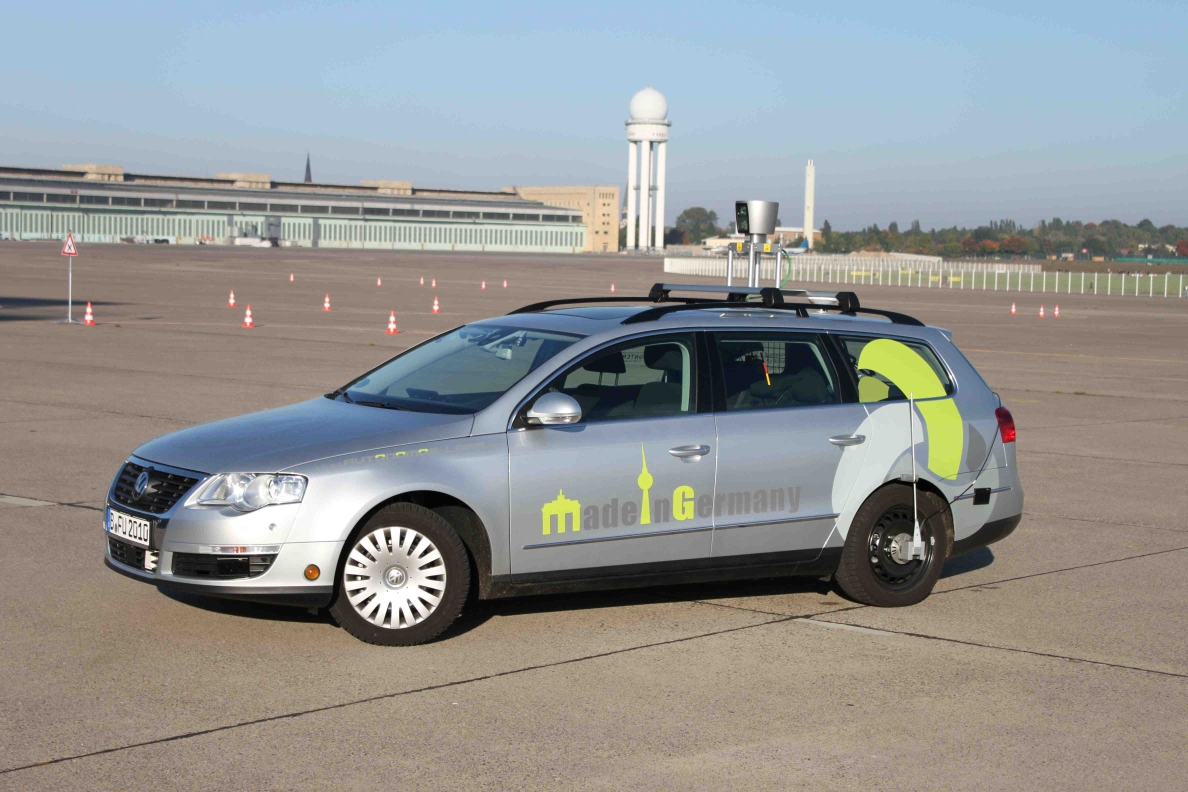
MadeInGermany in Berlin, Germany, in 2012

In 2012, Volkswagen began testing a "Temporary Auto Pilot" (TAP) system that would allow a car to drive itself at speeds of up to 80 miles per hour (130 km/h) on the highway. Ford has conducted extensive research into driverless systems and vehicular communication systems.

In April 2012, Florida became the second state in the United States to allow the testing of autonomous cars on public roads, and California became the third when Governor Jerry Brown signed the bill into law at Google Headquarters in Mountain View.

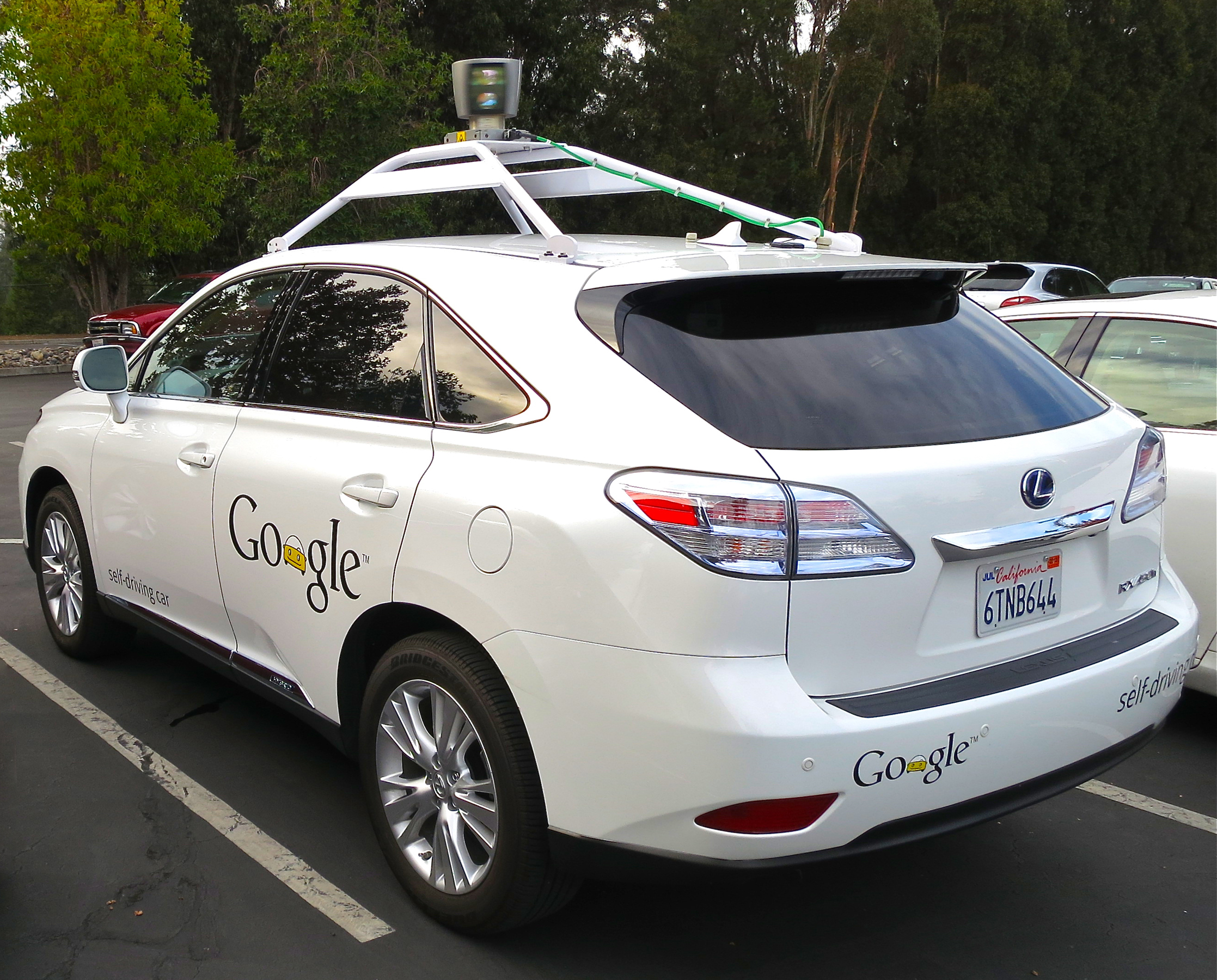
Lexus RX450h retrofitted as a Google driverless car

On 1 May 2012, a 22 km (14 mi) driving test was administered to a Google self-driving car by the Nevada Department of Motor Vehicles in Las Vegas. The autonomous car passed the test but was not tested at roundabouts, no-signal railroad crossings, or school zones. Nevada passed a law in June 2011 concerning the operation of autonomous cars in the state, which went into effect in 2012. A Toyota Prius modified with Google's experimental driverless technology was licensed by the Nevada Department of Motor Vehicles in the same year; this was the first license issued in the United States for a self-driven car. License plates issued in Nevada for testing autonomous cars have a red background and feature an infinity symbol (∞) on the left side because, according to the Director of the Department of Motor Vehicles, "using the infinity symbol was the best way to represent the 'car of the future.'" Nevada's test regulations required a person behind the wheel and one in the passenger's seat during tests.

==== 2013 ====
In January 2013, Toyota demonstrated a partially self-driving car with numerous sensors and communication systems. Other programs in the field include the 2GetThere passenger vehicles from the Netherlands and the DARPA Grand Challenge in the USA; some plans for bimodal public transport systems include autonomous cars as a component.

On 12 July 2013, VisLab conducted another test of autonomous vehicles, during which a robotic vehicle drove in downtown Parma with no human control, navigating roundabouts, traffic lights, pedestrian crossings and other common hazards.

In August 2013, Daimler R&D, with Karlsruhe Institute of Technology/FZI, made a Mercedes-Benz S-class vehicle with close-to-production stereo cameras and radars that drove completely autonomously for about 100 km from Mannheim to Pforzheim, Germany, following the historic Bertha Benz Memorial Route.

Also in August 2013, Nissan announced its plans to launch several driverless cars by 2020, and installed its autonomous car technology in a Nissan Leaf electric car for demonstration purposes. The car was demonstrated at the Nissan 360 test drive event held in California in August 2013. In September 2013, the Leaf fitted the prototype Advanced Driver Assistance System was granted a license plate that allowed it to be driven on Japanese public roads. The testing car will be used by Nissan engineers to evaluate how its in-house autonomous driving software performs in the real world. Time spent on public roads will help refine the car's software for fully automated driving. The autonomous Leaf was demonstrated on public roads for the first time at a media event held in Japan in November 2013. The Leaf drove on the Sagami Expressway in Kanagawa prefecture, near Tokyo. Nissan vice chairman Toshiyuki Shiga and the prefecture's Governor, Yuji Kuroiwa, rode in the car during the test.

Available in 2013, the 2014 Mercedes S-Class has options for autonomous steering, lane keeping, acceleration/braking, parking, accident avoidance, and driver fatigue detection, in both city traffic and highway speeds of up to 124 miles (200 km) per hour.

Released in 2013, the 2014 Infiniti Q50 uses cameras, radar, and other technology to deliver various lane-keeping, collision avoidance and cruise control features. One reviewer remarked, "With the Q50 managing its speed and adjusting course, I could sit back and simply watch, even on mildly curving highways, for three or more miles at a stretch," adding that he wasn't touching the steering wheel or pedals.

==== 2014 ====
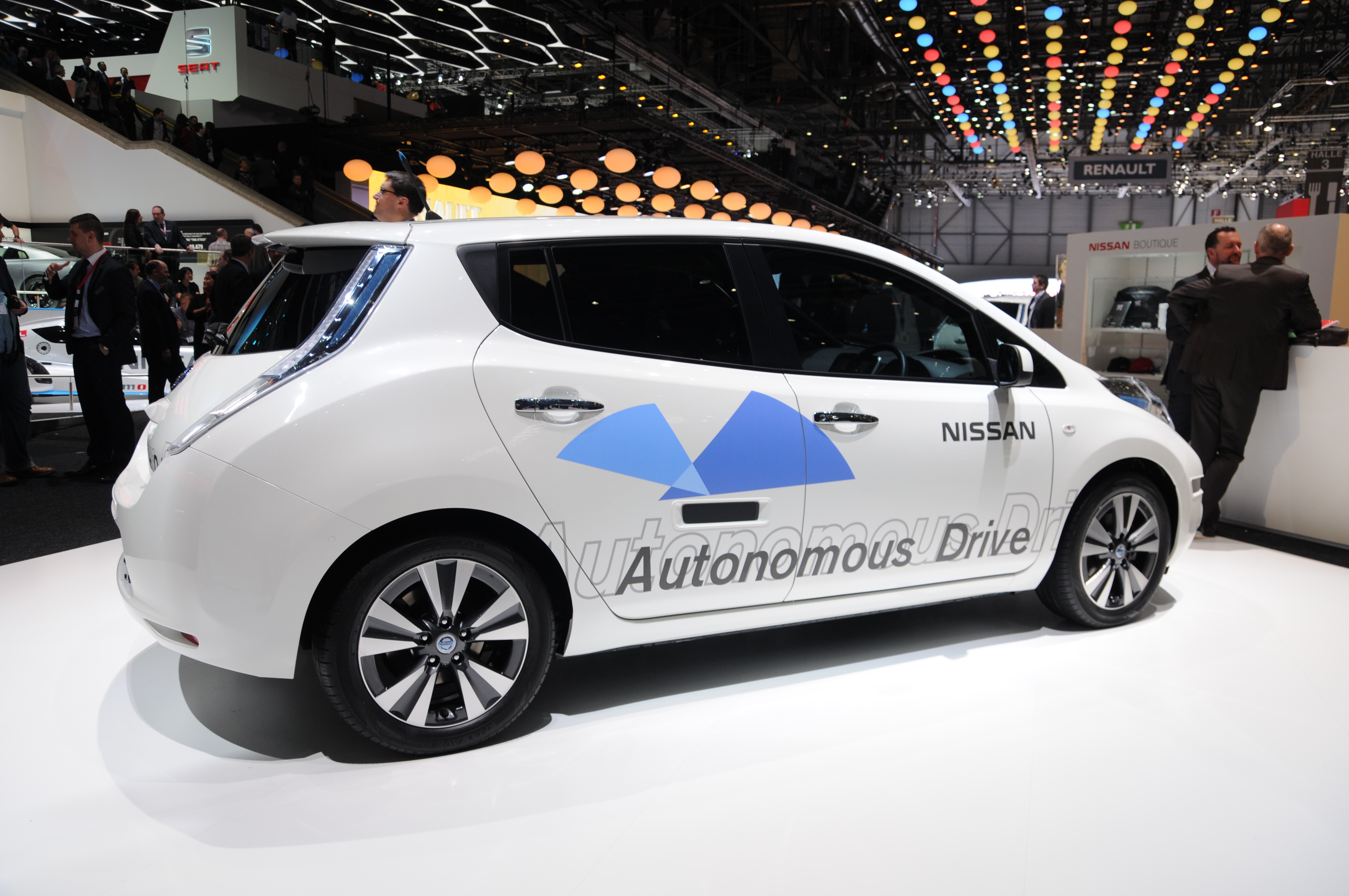
Nissan's autonomous prototype technology was fitted on a Nissan Leaf all-electric car.

In January 2014, Induct Technology's Navia shuttle became the first self-driving vehicle to be available for commercial sale. Limited to 12.5 miles per hour (20.1 km/h), the open-air electric vehicle resembles a golf cart and seats up to eight people. It is intended to shuttle people around "pedestrianized city centers, large industrial sites, airports, theme parks, university campuses, or hospital complexes."

In October 2014, Tesla Motors announced its first version of Autopilot. Model S cars equipped with this system are capable of lane control with autonomous steering, braking, and speed limit adjustment based on signal image recognition. The system also provides autonomous parking and can receive software updates to improve skills over time.

In 2014, SAE International, an automotive standardization body, published a classification system with six levels – ranging from fully manual to fully automated systems – as J3016, Taxonomy and Definitions for Terms Related to On-Road Motor Vehicle Automated Driving Systems.

==== 2015 ====
In February 2015, the UK Government announced it would oversee public trials of the LUTZ Pathfinder driverless pod in Milton Keynes.

In March 2015, Tesla Motors announced that it will introduce its Autopilot technology by mid-2015 through a software update for the cars equipped with the systems that allow autonomous driving. Some industry experts have raised questions about the legal status of autonomous driving in the US and whether a Model S owner would violate current state regulations when using the autopilot function. The few states that have passed laws allowing autonomous cars on the road limit their use for testing purposes, not the use by the general public. Also, there are questions about the liability of autonomous cars in case there is a mistake. A Tesla spokesman said there is no conflict with current regulations. Google's director of self-driving cars at the company said he does not think there is a regulatory block as far as the self-driving vehicle met crash-test and other safety standards. A spokesman for the National Highway Traffic Safety Administration (NHTSA) said that "any autonomous vehicle would need to meet applicable federal motor vehicle safety standards" and the NHTSA "will have the appropriate policies and regulations in place to ensure the safety of this type of vehicles."

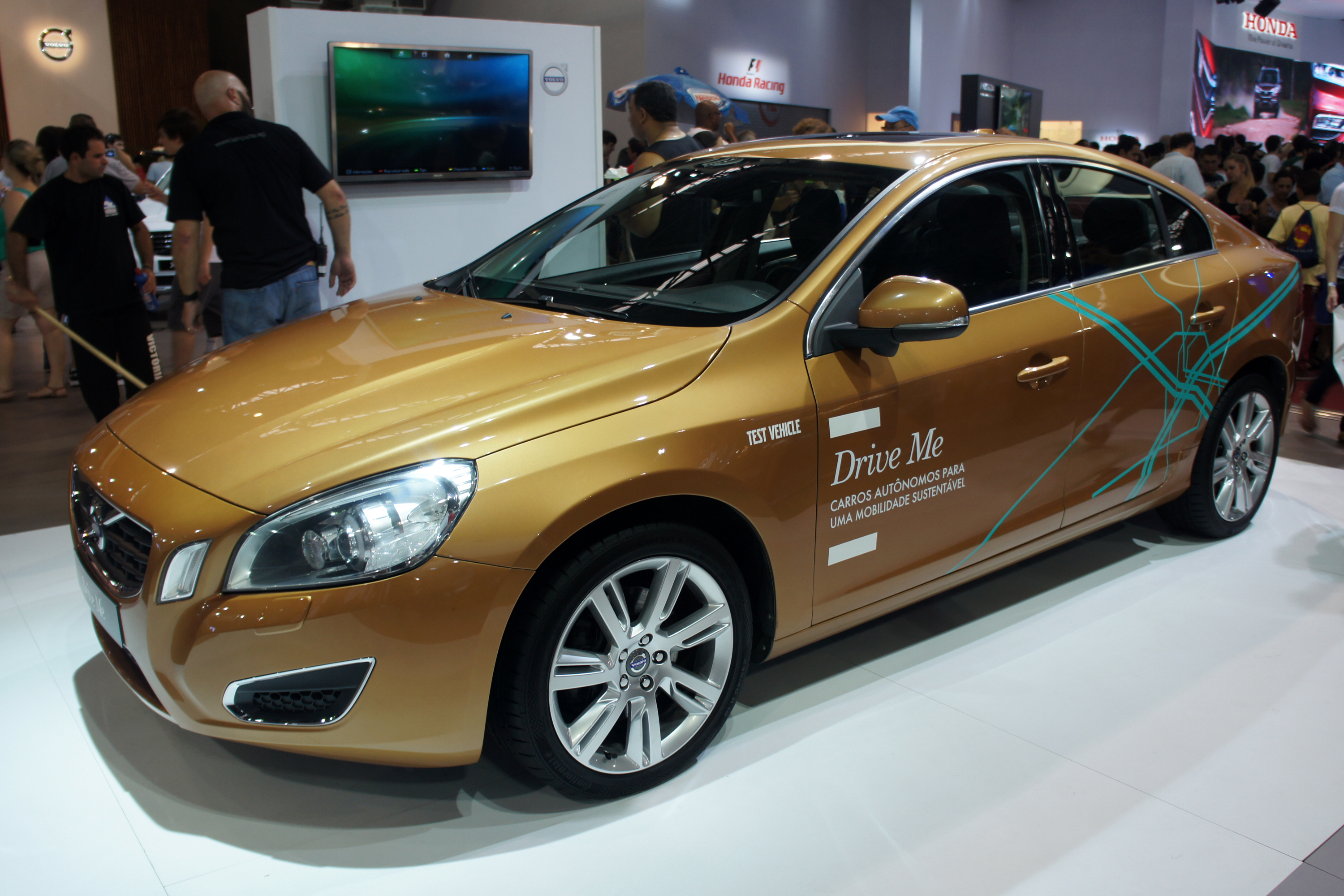
The Volvo S60 Drive Me autonomous test vehicle is considered Level 3 autonomous driving.

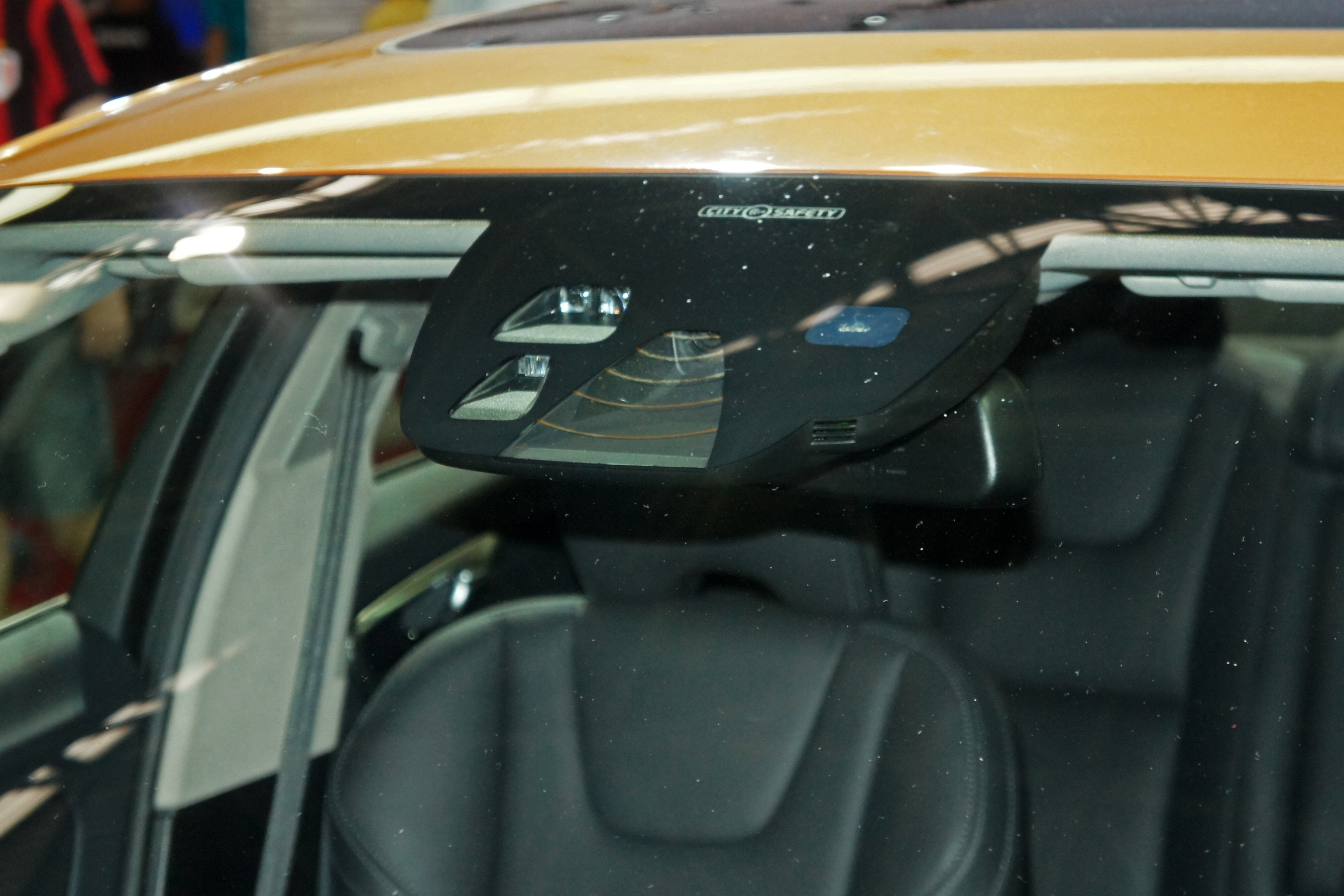
Frontal sensors in the Volvo S60 test vehicle

In mid-October 2015, Tesla Motors rolled out version 7 of its software in the US, branded as an autopilot, that included some autonomous capabilities. On January 9, 2016, Tesla rolled out version 7.1 as an over-the-air update, adding a new "summon" feature that allows cars to self-park at parking locations without the driver in the car. Tesla's autonomous driving features are ahead of production cars, and can be classified as is somewhere between Level 2 and Level 3 under the defunct NHTSA five levels of vehicle automation. At these levels, the car can act autonomously but requires the full attention of the driver, who must be prepared to take control at a moment's notice. Autopilot is not fully autonomous and cannot detect pedestrians or cyclists.

In February 2015, Volvo Cars announced its plans to lease 100 XC90 SUVs fitted with Drive Me Level 3 automation technology to residents of Gothenburg in 2017.

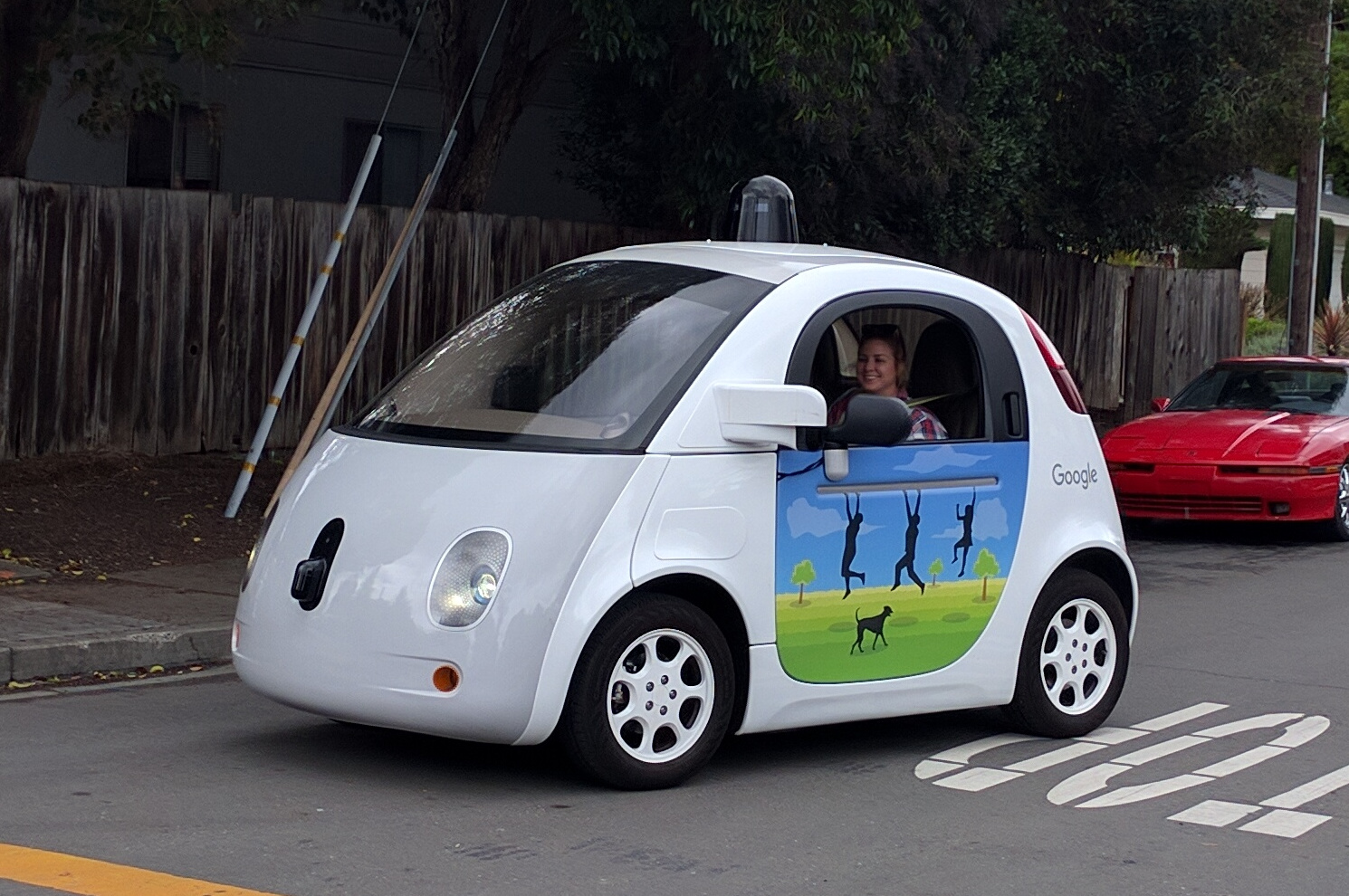
Google's in-house driverless car. As of July 2015, Google's driverless test vehicles had been involved in 14 minor accidents since 2009.

In April 2015, a car designed by Delphi Automotive became the first automated vehicle to complete a coast-to-coast journey across North America. It travelled from San Francisco to New York, under computer control for 99% of that distance.

In July 2015, Google announced that the test vehicles in its driverless car project had been involved in 14 minor accidents since the project's inception in 2009. Chris Urmson, the project leader, said that all of the accidents were caused by humans driving other cars and that 11 of the mishaps were rear-end collisions. "Our self-driving cars are being hit surprisingly often by other drivers who are distracted and not paying attention to the road. That's a big motivator for us." Over the six years of the project's existence, the test vehicles had logged nearly 2 million miles on the road.

A*STAR's Institute for Infocomm Research (I^{2}R) developed a self-driving vehicle, which was the first to be approved in Singapore for public road testing at one-north in July 2015. It has ferried several dignitaries such as Prime Minister Lee Hsien Loong, Minister S. Iswaran, Minister Vivian Balakrishnan, and several ministers from other countries.

==== 2016 ====
In April 2016, Volvo announced plans to deploy 100 XC90 self-driving cars to test them in everyday driving conditions in China in 2017. Also in April 2016, the carmaker announced plans to begin a trial in London in 2017 with 100 Volvo XC90 plug-in hybrids fitted with Drive Me technology. The XC90s will be leased to everyday users, and the self-driving cars will log every journey, passing on that data to Thatcham Research, which will conduct a thorough analysis to examine how the car behaves in everyday situations as well as understand how other road users and the car's occupants respond to autonomous driving decisions made by the car.

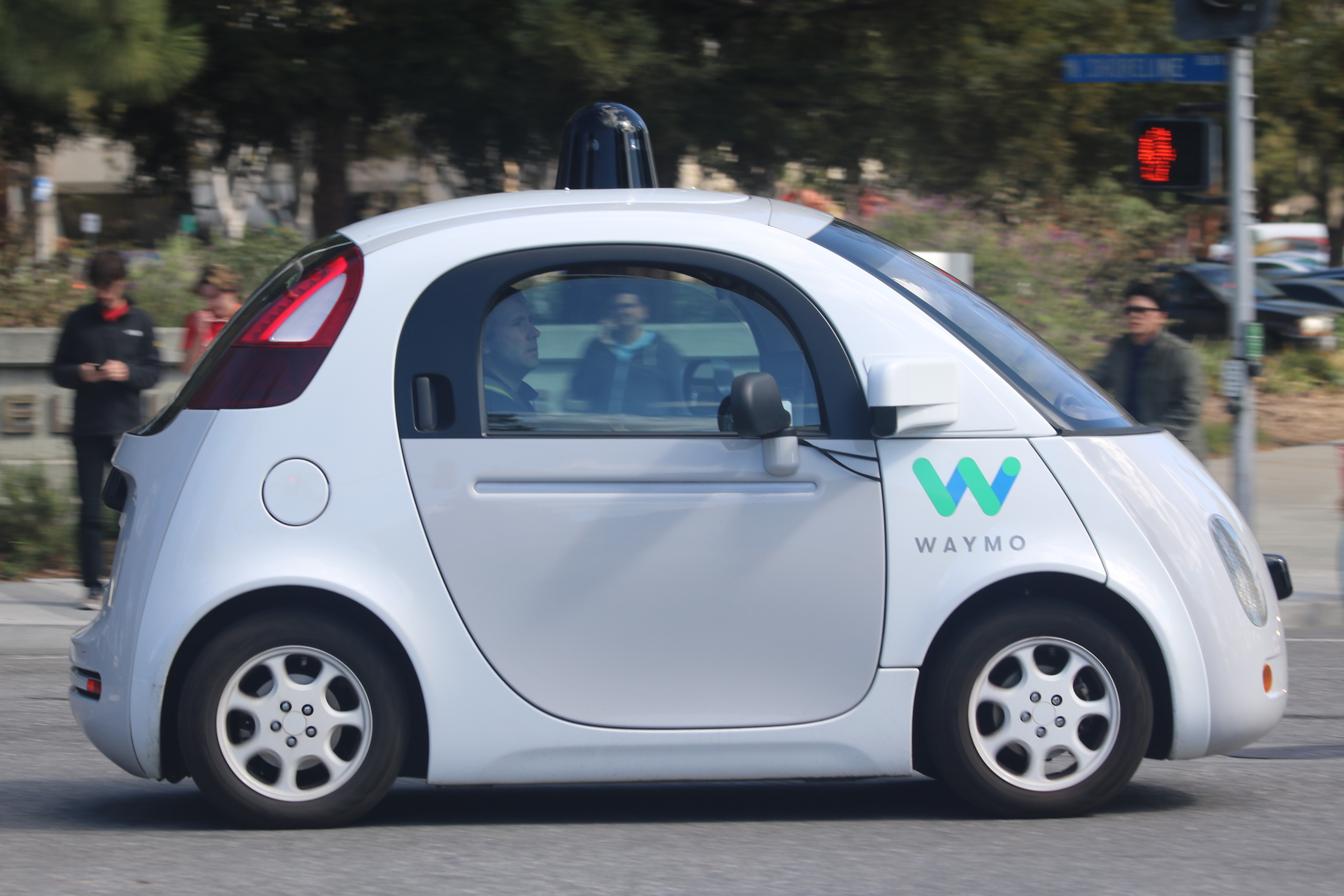
Waymo LLC is a self-driving technology development company.

The first known fatal accident involving a vehicle being driven by itself took place in Williston, Florida, on 7 May 2016, while a Tesla Model S electric car was engaged in Autopilot mode. The driver was killed in a crash with a large 18-wheel tractor-trailer. On 28 June 2016, the National Highway Traffic Safety Administration (NHTSA) opened a formal investigation into the accident, working with the Florida Highway Patrol. According to the NHTSA, preliminary reports indicate the crash occurred when the tractor-trailer made a left turn in front of the Tesla at an intersection on a non-controlled access highway, and the car failed to apply the brakes. The car continued to travel after passing under the truck's trailer. The NHTSA's preliminary evaluation was opened to examine the design and performance of any automated driving systems in use at the time of the crash, which involves a population of an estimated 25,000 Model S cars.

In August 2016, Singapore launched the first self-driving taxi service (as a pilot), provided by an autonomous vehicle startup company called nuTonomy.

In September 2016, the National Highway Traffic Safety Administration (NHTSA) adopted the SAE classification standard, and the SAE classification became widely accepted.

From 2016 to 2018, the European Commission funded development for connected and automated driving through Coordination Actions CARTRE and SCOUT programs. The Strategic Transport Research and Innovation Agenda (STRIA) Roadmap for Connected and Automated Transport was published in 2019.

In October 2016, Tesla said that all of their cars are built with the necessary hardware to allow full self-driving capability at a safety level (SAE Level 5). The hardware includes eight surround cameras and twelve ultrasonic sensors, in addition to the forward-facing radar with enhanced processing capabilities. The system operates in "shadow mode" (processing without taking action) and sends data back to Tesla to improve its abilities until the software is ready for deployment via over-the-air upgrades. Full autonomy is only likely after millions of miles of testing, and approval by authorities. Tesla Motors said it expected to enable full self-driving by the end of 2017. As of 2025, this has not happened.

In September 2017, SAE and GM announced a new collegiate autonomous vehicle challenge: the SAE Autodrive Challenge. The goal of the four-year-long competition is to have a vehicle navigate an urban driving course in an automated driving mode as described by SAE Standard (J3016) Level 4 definition by year four. Each team is provided with a 2017 Chevrolet Bolt EV to modify with state-of-the-art sensors. A total of 8 universities across North America participate in this competition: Kettering University, Michigan State University, Michigan Technological University, North Carolina A&T State University, Texas A&M University, University of Toronto, University of Waterloo, and Virginia Tech. The University of Toronto Team aUToronto has claimed all 4 years of first place award with their autonomous vehicle Zeus.

The autonomous driving technology company Argo AI was co-founded in November 2016 by Bryan Salesky and Peter Rander, formerly of the Google and Uber automated driving programs. Primarily backed by Ford Motor Co. ($1 billon in 2017) and the Volkswagen Group ($2.6 billion in 2020), the company built software, hardware, maps, and cloud-support infrastructure. Argo claimed its technology would deliver Level 4-capable Self-Driving Systems (SDS) for autonomous driving (AV) vehicles.

==== 2017 ====
On June 4, 2017, Audi stated that its new A8 would be fully self-driving for speeds up to 60 km/h using its Audi AI. Contrary to other cars, the driver would not have to do safety checks such as touching the steering wheel every 15 seconds to use this feature. The Audi A8 would therefore be the first production car to reach Level 3 autonomous driving, meaning that the driver could safely turn their attention away from driving tasks, e.g. the driver can text or watch a movie. Audi would also be the first manufacturer to use a 3D LIDAR system in addition to cameras and ultrasonic sensors for their AI. This Level 3 functionality was never implemented, and in April 2020 Audi announced that the system was not going to be activated.

In November, Waymo announced testing of autonomous cars without a safety driver. However, an employee was in the car to handle emergencies.

==== 2018 ====
In March 2018, the death of Elaine Herzberg in Arizona was the first reported fatal crash involving a self-driving vehicle and a pedestrian in the United States, caused by an Uber test vehicle with a human backup driver. Prosecutors did not charge Uber, while the human driver was sentenced to probation. Later in the same month, San Francisco police issued a ticket to the passenger of the self-driving car operated by GM's Cruise, that had failed to yield to a pedestrian in a crosswalk.

Also in March of that year, the world's first fully electric self-driving bus that is open to the general public is launched in Neuhausen am Rheinfall, Switzerland.

In December, Waymo launched the first commercial robotaxi called "Waymo One"; users in the Phoenix metropolitan area use an app to request a pick-up. The cars were monitored in real-time, and remote engineers intervened to handle exceptional conditions.

==== 2019 ====
In March 2019, ahead of Roborace, Robocar set the Guinness World Record as the world's fastest autonomous car. Robocar reached 282.42 kilometres per hour (175.49 mph).

In May, twenty-nine U.S. states passed laws permitting autonomous cars.

=== 2020s ===
Towards the end of this decade, various autonomous bus services went into service around the world.

==== 2020 ====
The first international regulations related to automated features appear:

- From 2022, European Union Regulation 2019/2144 applies for automated vehicles.
- In June 2020, UNECE WP.29 GRVA establishes regulation on SAE Level 3.

In October 2020 Tesla released a "beta" version of its "Full Self-Driving" software to a small group of testers in the United States.

==== 2021 ====
In March 2021, Honda began leasing in Japan a limited edition of 100 Legend Hybrid EX sedans equipped with the newly approved Level 3 automated driving equipment which was granted the safety certification by Japanese government to their autonomous "Traffic Jam Pilot" driving technology. This legally allows drivers to take their eyes off the road when the car is travelling under 30 kilometres per hour (19 mph).

In April 2021, after four years of success in the Autodrive Challenge Series I, SAE and GM announced the second series of the SAE Autodrive Challenge. Participating university includes Kettering University, Michigan Tehchnological University, North Carolina A&T University, Ohio State University, Penn State University, Texas A&M University, University of Toronto, University of Wisconsin - Madison, Queens University, and Virginia Tech. The University of Toronto Team aUToronto achieved their 5th time first place in this competition series.

Nuro, an American autonomous vehicle technology company, began autonomous commercial delivery operations in California in 2021. DeepRoute.ai launched robotaxi service in Shenzhen in July of that year.

In December 2021, Mercedes-Benz received German approval for a Level 3 Automated Lane Keeping System (ALKS) self-driving technology complying with UN-R157 legal requirements.

==== 2022 ====
In May 2022, Mercedes-Benz launched the Drive Pilot system in Germany, capable of operating at SAE Level 3 for the company's S-Class and EQS models.

Argo AI, the autonomous vehicle technology venture backed by Ford and Volkswagen, announced its disbandment in October after a net loss of $827 million in the third quarter. Ford assumed a $2.7 billion accounting charge and wrote off a cash investment of about $500 million. Similarly, Volkswagen expensed €1.9 billion. A number of resources from were transitioned to Ford's ADAS effort Latitude AI, and VW's ADAS efforts CARIAD. VW also continued it autonomy efforts with its ID BUZZ platform with Mobileye, an alternative SDS supplier. Ford CEO Jim Farley stated that while they were optimistic about the technology, "profitable, fully autonomous vehicles at scale are a long way off."

In December, Japan's eve autonomy Inc., a company backed by Yamaha Motor and TIER IV, launched "eve auto", an SAE Level 4 service for industrial use. This was initially deployed at nine sites, including Yamaha Motor's three factories, Prime Polymer's Anesaki Works, Panasonic's cold chain factory in Oizumi, and ENEOS Corp.'s Negishi refinery. It included the first dedicated insurance coverage for an autonomous driving system provider.

==== 2023 ====
On 1 April 2023 in Japan, the amended "Road Traffic Act" to allow Level 4.

On 8 June, Sacramento, California issued an automated driving system permit to Mercedes-Benz USA, allowing the Drive Pilot automated driving system on some California highways under specific conditions (SAE Level 3). This made Mercedes-Benz the fourth company to receive an autonomous vehicle deployment permit in California, and the first authorized to sell or lease to the public vehicles with an automated driving system. The Level 3 Drive Pilot can only operate on highways during daylight at speeds not exceeding 40 miles per hour (64 km/h). The permit excludes operation on city or county streets, in construction zones, during heavy rain or heavy fog, or on flooded roads and during weather conditions that impact Drive Pilot performance. The driver must also remain behind the wheel to take over when prompted. Vehicle owners must watch a mandatory video before activating the system.

The US rebotics company Nuro was approved for Level 4 vehicles in Palo Alto, California in August, 2023.

==== 2024 ====
In May 2024, the UK updated its legislation with the Automated Vehicles (AV) Act to have driverless cars on British motorways by 2026 (later postponed to 2027).

== Notable projects ==
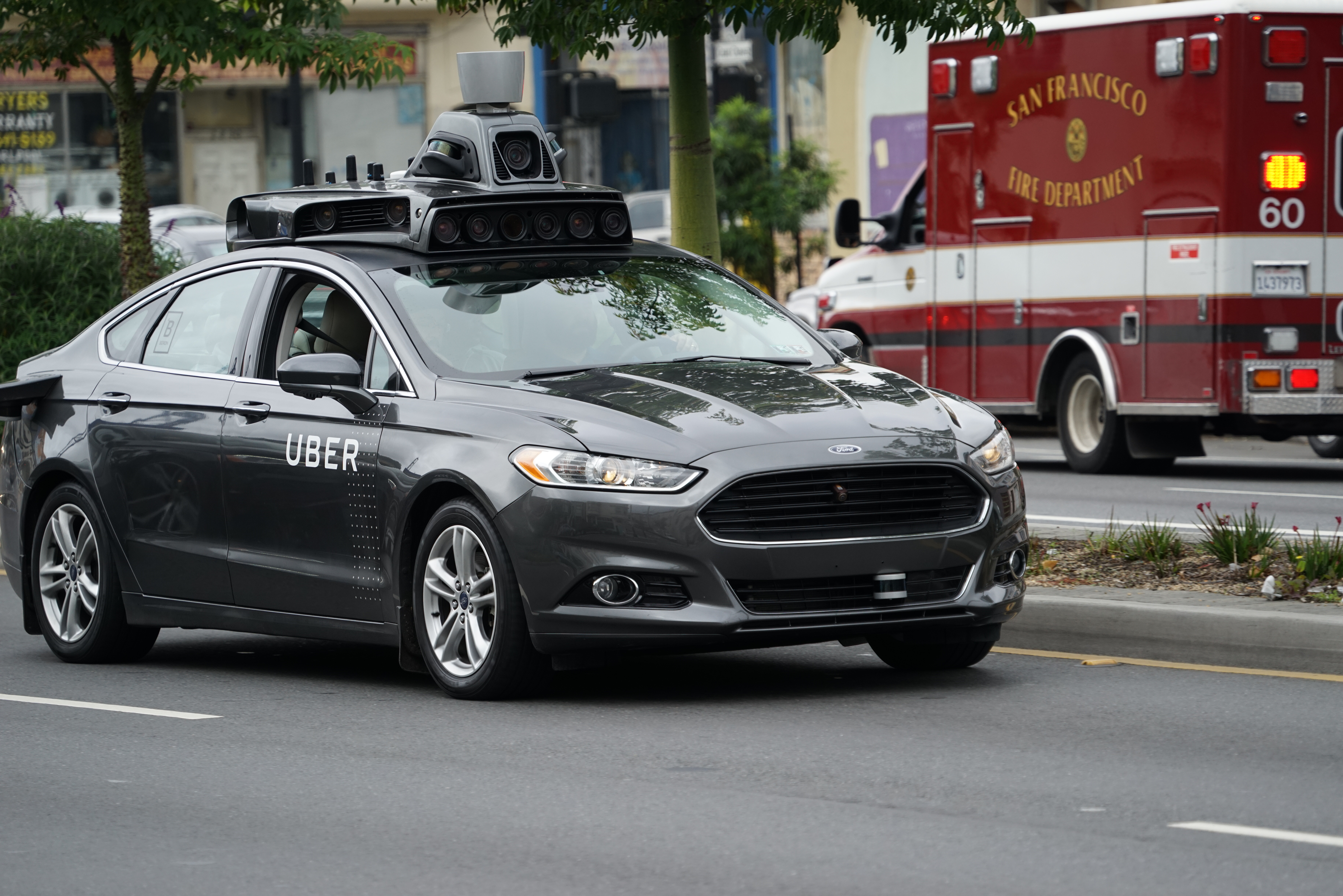
Uber autonomous vehicle prototype testing in San Francisco

- The DARPA Grand Challenge was held in 2004, 2005, and 2007 as an autonomous driving competition with millions of dollars in prize money.
- The Google driverless car project (now Waymo) maintained a test fleet of autonomous vehicles that had driven 300,000 miles (480,000 km) with no machine-caused accidents as of August 2012. By April 2014 700,000 autonomous miles (1,100,000 km) were logged with 2,000,000 miles (3,219,000 km) self driven by December 2016. The project then changed its name in that year to Waymo, moving from Google to become part of Alphabet.
- EUREKA Prometheus Project (1987–95) – was the €800 million research project conducted by EC on autonomous vehicles. Among its culmination points were the twin robot vehicles VITA-2 and VaMP of Daimler-Benz and Ernst Dickmanns, driving long At the time, this was the longest-ever journey conducted by an unmanned vehicle.
- "CityMobil2" (2012–16) – was the European Union funded research and development project of self-driving shuttle in Europe.
- "SIP-adus" (1st phase: 2014–2018, 2nd phase: 2019–2023), Japan's national project which was led by Cabinet Office to achieve legally approved Level 3 driving on public roads, and contributed to the amendment of related laws.
- Israel has significant research efforts to develop a fully autonomous border-patrol vehicle. This originated with its success with Unmanned Combat Air Vehicles, and following the construction of the Israeli West Bank barrier. Two projects, by Elbit Systems and Israel Aircraft Industries, are based on the locally produced Armored "Tomcar" and have the specific purpose of patrolling barrier fences against intrusions.
- The Oshkosh Corporation developed an autonomous military vehicle called TerraMax and is integrating its systems into some future vehicles.
- Apple electric car project "Titan" (2014–2024) – became to have autonomous system subproject in 2015.
- Uber Advanced Technologies Group (ATG: 2015–21) – announced a partnership with Carnegie Mellon to develop its own autonomous cars.
- "nuTonomy" – Aptiv, and Optimus Ride, have been testing autonomous cars in the Boston Marine Industrial Park; in June 2018, permission expanded to the entire city of Boston with a framework to expand to other cities in Eastern Massachusetts.
- "L3Pilot" (2017–22) – a large-scale piloting of automated driving with developed SAE Level 3 and Level 4 functions in passenger cars was conducted in Europe during the period between September 2017 and February 2022.
- "Avenue" (2018–22) – under EU funding programme Horizon 2020, a large scale self-driving shuttle project was conducted in four cities (Geneva, Lyon, Copenhagen and Luxembourg).
- "Torc Robotics" (2019– ) – has been testing autonomous vehicles across the southeastern United States. Torc previously produced military vehicles, autonomous shuttles, and self-driving cars in partnership with AAA.

== University projects ==
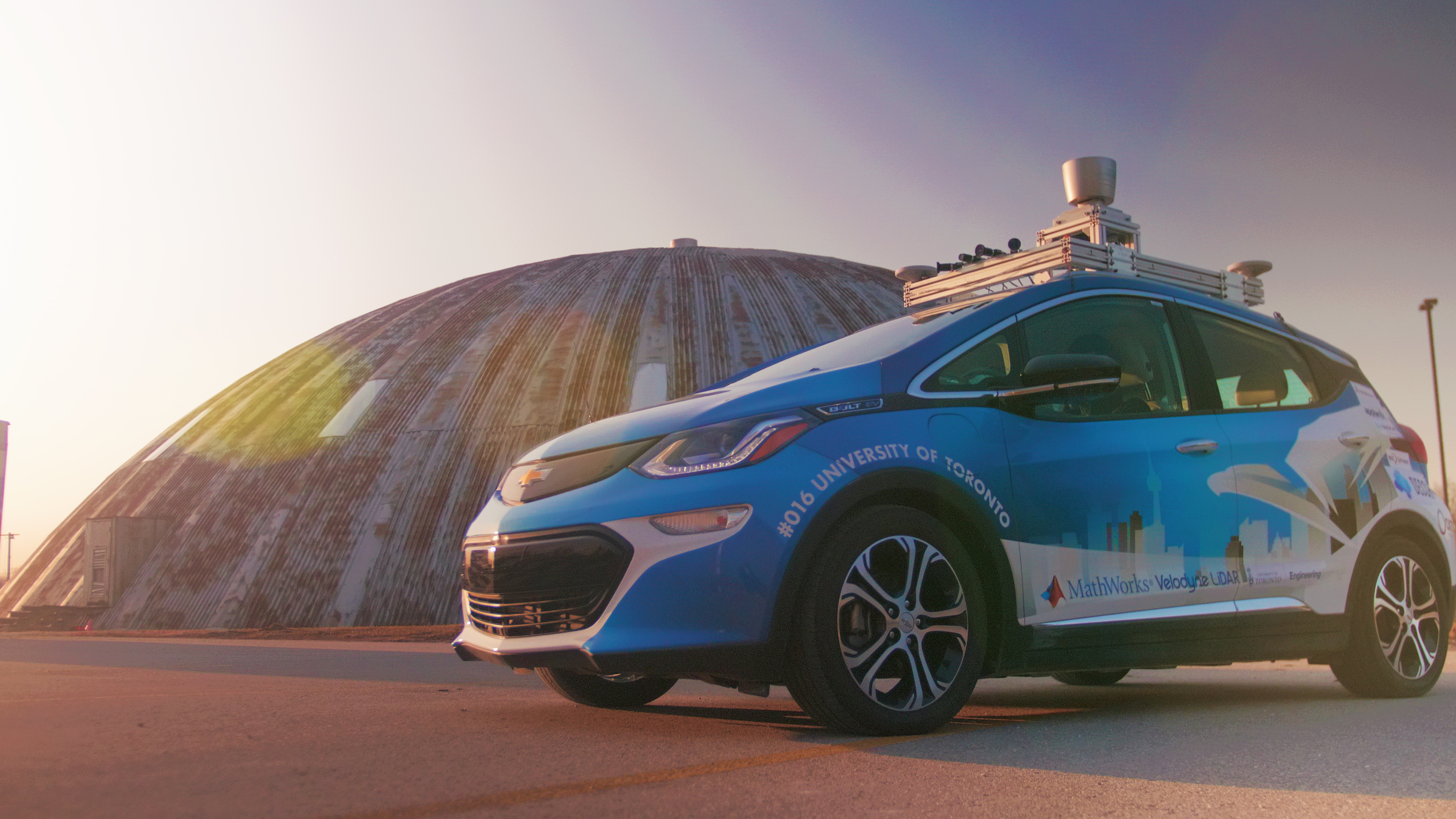
University of Toronto's autonomous vehicle Zeus at the UTIAS test site

- The ARGO vehicle (see History above) is the predecessor of the BRAiVE vehicle, both from the University of Parma's VisLab. Argo was developed in 1996 and demonstrated to the world in 1998; BRAiVE was developed in 2008 and demonstrated in 2009 at the IEEE IV conference in Xi'an, China.
- In 2012, Stanford's Dynamic Design Lab, in collaboration with the Volkswagen Electronics Research Lab, produced Shelley, an Audi TTS designed for high speed (greater than 100 miles per hour (160 km/h)) on a racetrack course.
- Oxford University's "WildCat Project" (2011) – created a modified Bowler Wildcat which is capable of autonomous operation using a flexible and diverse sensor suite.
- Oxford University's "RobotCar UK" project (2013) – an inexpensive autonomous car capable of quickly switching from manual driving to autopilot on learned routes.
- "AutoNOMOS" – a part of the Artificial Intelligence Group of the Free University of Berlin.
- Zeus – an autonomous vehicle system developed by students at the University of Toronto, achieved four times first place in the SAE Autodrive Challenge Series I and became one of the first groups to bring autonomous vehicles to life in Toronto, Canada.

== History of self-driving car laws ==
In June 2011, the US state of Nevada became the first jurisdiction in the world to legislate for self-driving. Since then, many state, national and supranational bodies have introduced similar laws with varying characteristics. Regulations governing the testing of automated cars on public roads (as opposed to full consumer operations) include those introduced by the government of the United Kingdom in 2013, with similar laws coming into effect in France in 2015.

Modification of existing international agreements on the use of vehicles on public roads has also taken place. The 1949 Vienna Geneva Convention on Road Traffic had assumed that a driver is always fully in control and responsible for the behaviour of a vehicle in traffic, but this was amended in 2016 to allow the possibility of automated features in vehicles.

Specific international regulations also began to be formulated in 2018 with the Working Party on Automated/Autonomous and Connected Vehicles (GRVA) recommending safety provisions related to the dynamics of vehicles (braking, steering), Advanced Driver Assistance Systems, Automated Driving Systems (ADS) and cyber security provisions for the World Forum for Harmonization of Vehicle Regulations (WP.29).

Individual jurisdictions around the world have also set up legal frameworks of various kinds. China introduced testing regulations for autonomous cars in 2018, and in 2020 issued the "Strategy for Innovation and Development of Intelligent Vehicles", a roadmap plan until 2025 relating to road traffic safety, surveying and mapping laws relating to intelligent vehicles. In Europe, Regulation 2019/2144, commonly known as the General Safety Regulation (GSR), came into force for all new cars in the European Union after 6th July 2022. Similar legislation followed in Japan with the law modified to reflect the finalized UNECE WP.29 GRVA regulations. In some cases regulations for fully manual cars have created unintended regulatory barriers for self-driving cars.

== See also ==
- History of train automation
