= History of train automation =

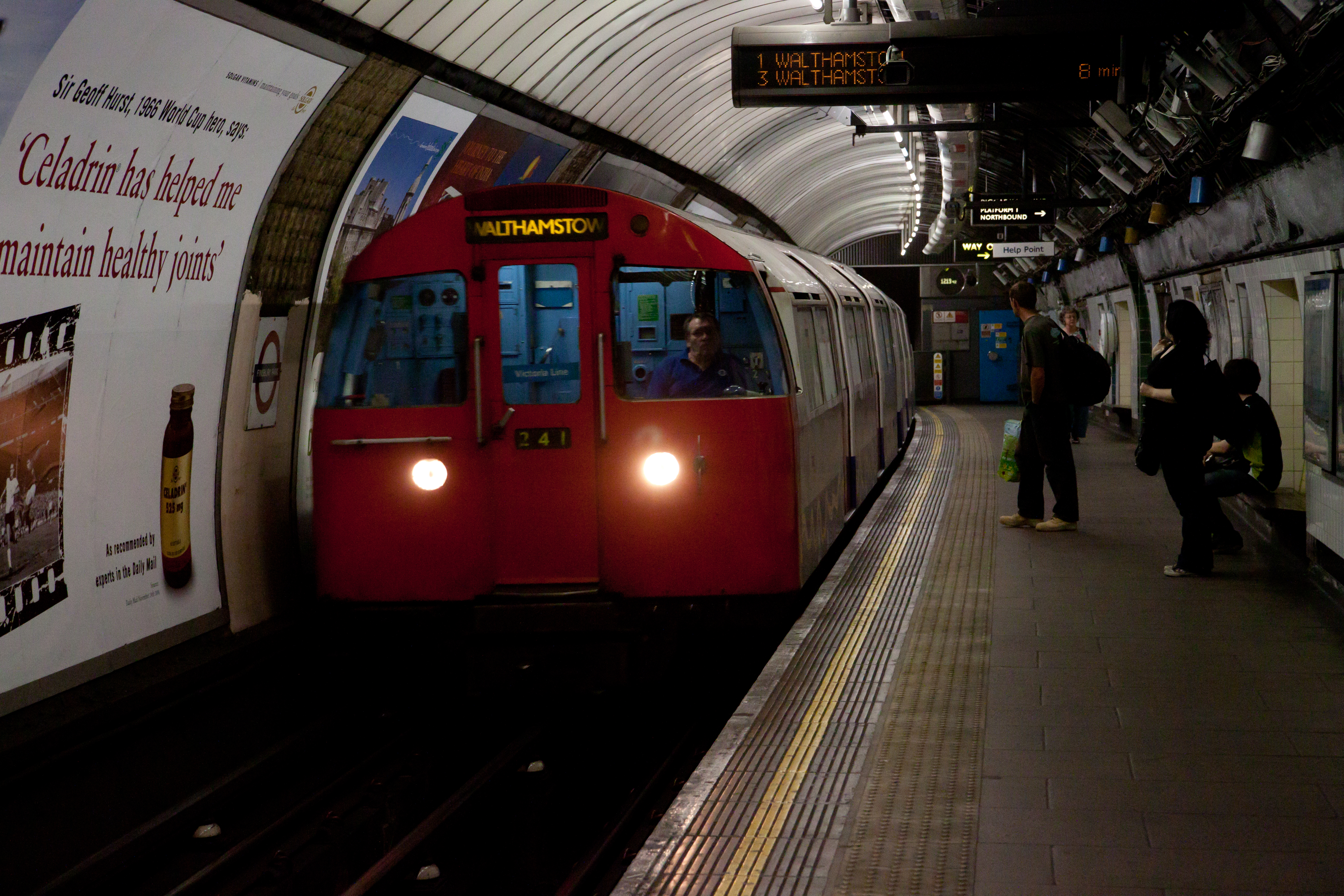
The Victoria line of the London Underground in London was one of the first metro lines to be equipped with automatic train operation.

The history of automatic train operation includes key dates for system introductions of different Grade of Automation. The lower grades, such as the German Punktförmige Zugbeeinflussung introduced in 1934 have been available earlier. Higher grades, such as the driverless operation have been introduced almost only in case automated guideway transit.

== Prototypes ==
The first North American automatic train stop system for the Boston Elevated Railway was introduced in 1901 by Union Switch and Signal Company. The first unmanned driving test on rail tracks was conducted in Berlin, Germany, in 1928 near the Krumme Lanke station.

=== MP 51 ===
MP 51, the first prototype of Paris' rubber-tyred metro, was fitted with GoA2 ATO from the start. It operated a quiet 770 m shuttle service with sharp turns and steep grades on la voie navette of the Paris Métro with passengers from 13 April 1952 until 31 May 1956. It featured a GoA2 system with an ATO "mat" fitted onto the underfloor of the train continuously in contact with a guide-line between the tracks nicknamed "Grecque", and often prompted passengers to "operate the train" by pushing the ATO start button. Lack of funds prevented installation on the rest of the Paris Metro until 1966, starting with line 11. Line 14, opened in 1998, was the first newly built Paris Métro to operate in GoA4, and Line 1 later also had its GoA2 ATO system from 1972 replaced to a newer GoA4 CBTC system.

=== FMB 600 series ===
The Barcelona Metro's (old) line II (now L5) was the first metro line in the world to install a GoA2 photoelectric cell-based ATO system on an existing metro line and on its FMB 600 series (Sèrie 600 de FMB) rolling stock. This system was implemented in 1960–1961 and decommissioned in 1970. Currently, L9 (Europe's longest driverless line) and L10 run with GoA4 ATO, while L11 runs with GoA3.

=== 1960 tube stock ===
A pilot for GoA2 ATO on the London Underground saw 1960 Stock trains fitted for ATO running along the Woodford to Hainault section of the Central Line from 1964 until 1986 when the trains were reverted to manual operation. The Victoria line opened in 1968 as the world's first newly built full-scale automatic railway and metro line and has since become the first to have an ATO system replaced. The full Central, Northern, and Jubilee lines have also been upgraded to run with ATO. The Circle, District, Hammersmith & City and Metropolitan lines are currently being modernised with a brand new automatic train control system.

=== Automatic Train Operation ===
The first train service with complete ATO is the Expo Express train that serviced the EXPO67, the Montreal World's Fair in summer in 1967. https://grandquebec.com/montreal-histoire/expo-express/#google_vignette

The second line to be operated with Automatic Train Operation (ATO) was London Underground's Victoria line, which opened in 1967. Both systems were fully automated although a driver was present in the cabin to reassure the passengers. Many lines now operate using an ATO system, with the aim of improving the frequency of service. Since then, ATO technology has been developed to enable trains to operate even without a driver in a cab: either with an attendant roaming within the train, or with no staff on board. The first fully automated driverless mass-transit rail network is the Port Island Line in Kobe, Japan. The second in the world (and the first such driverless system in Europe) is the Lille Metro in northern France.

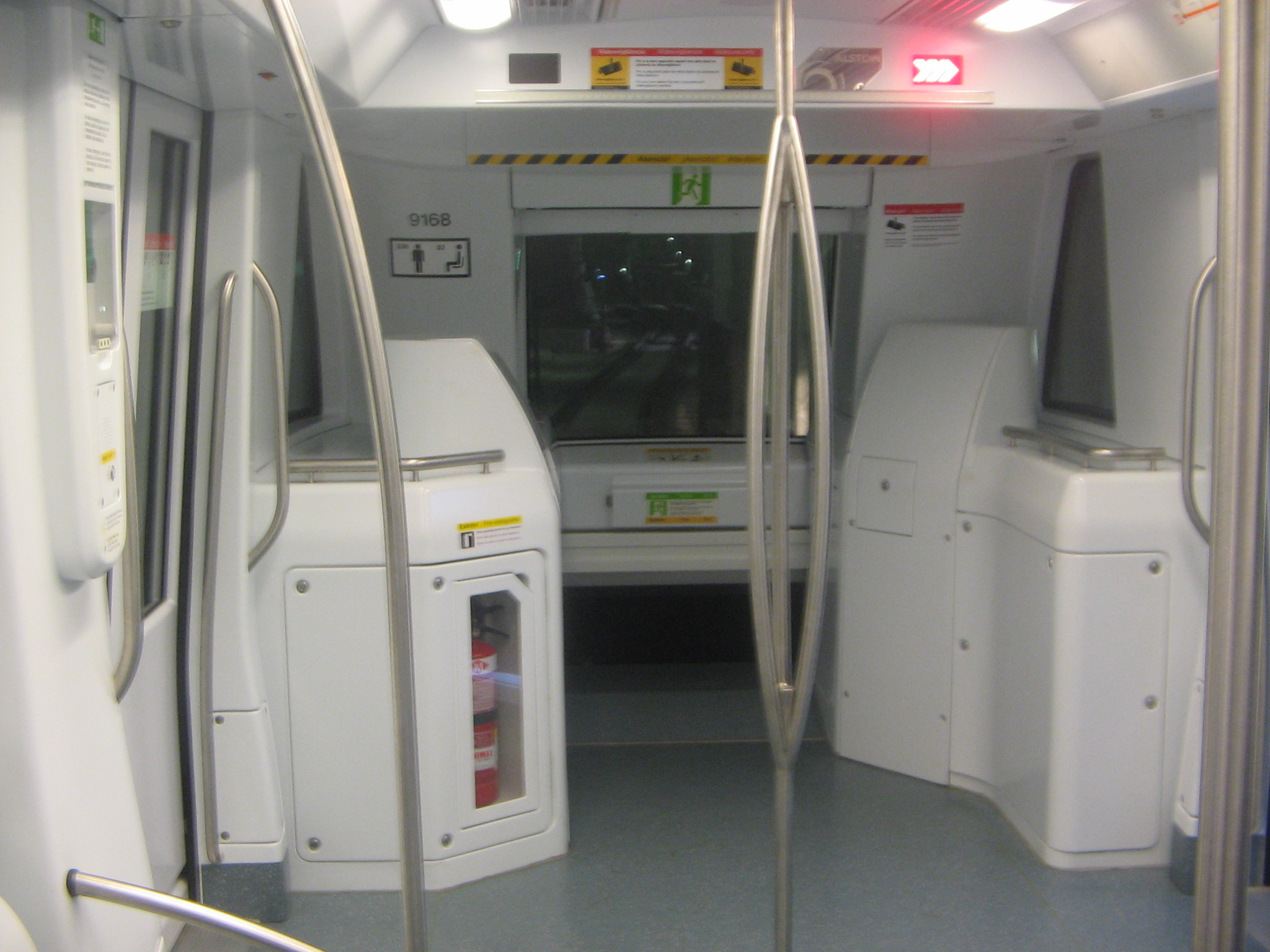
Barcelona Metro line 9 without train driver (GoA4)

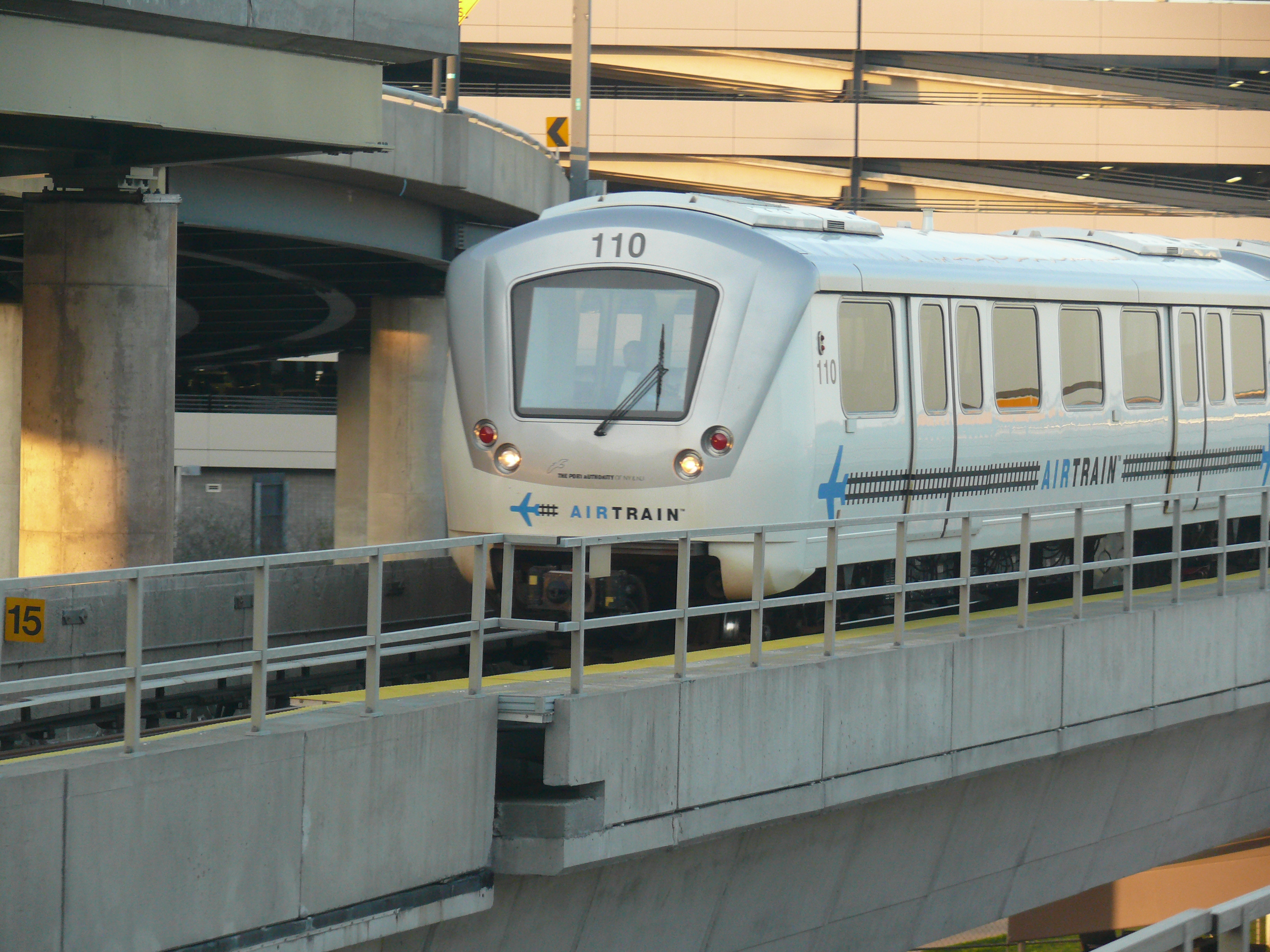
AirTrain JFK system

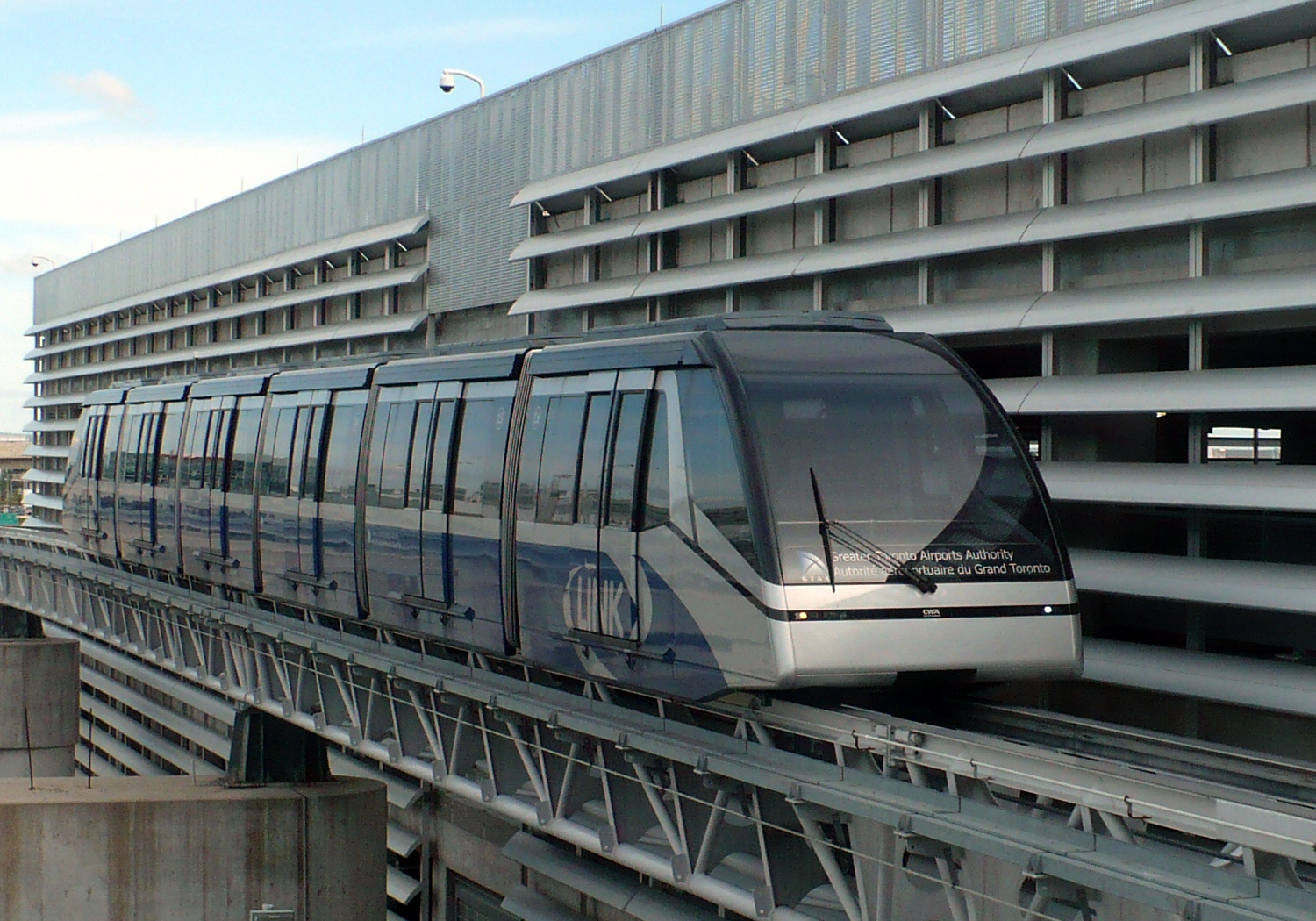
Terminal Link at Toronto Pearson International Airport

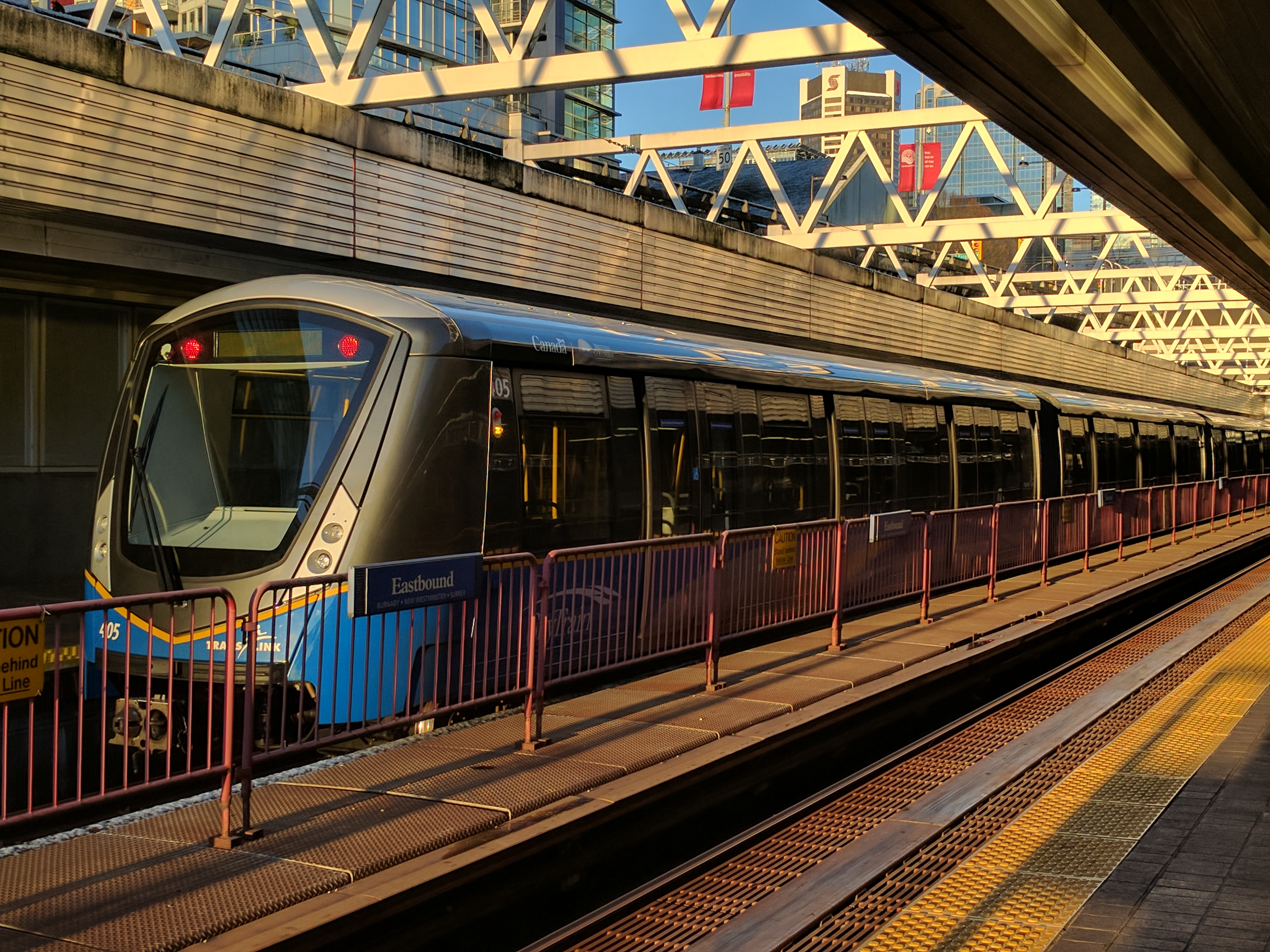
Metro Vancouver's SkyTrain has been in operation since 1985; it is fully automated on all lines and is the 5th longest automated metro system in the world with 79.6 km (49.5 mi) of automated lines.

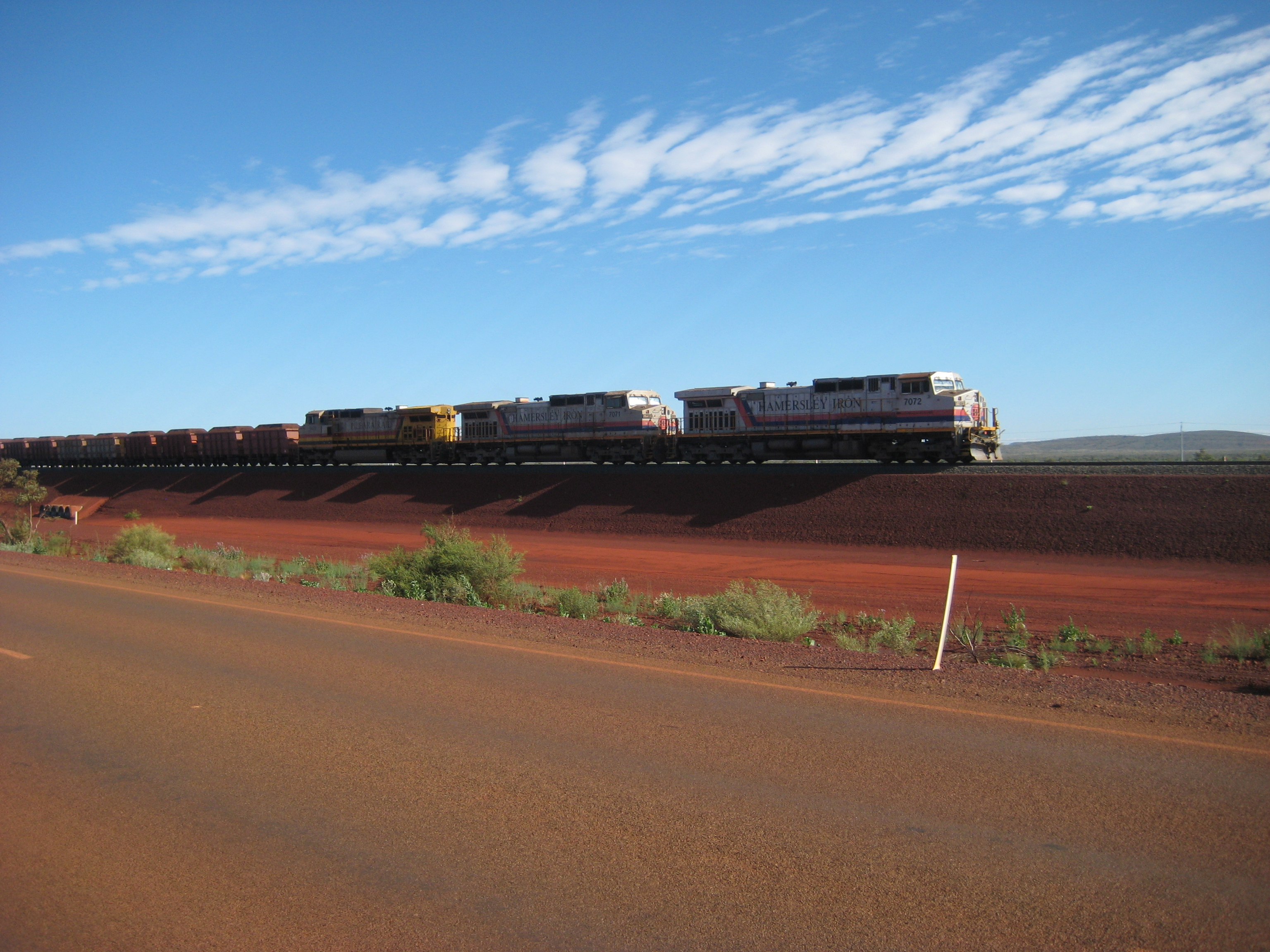
The Rio Tinto Mining Company in Western Australia runs the world's largest network of driverless trains, with 1,700 km (1,100 mi) of freight railways run by an increasing number of completely unattended trains.

The Teito Rapid Transit Authority (TRTA; now Tokyo Metro) piloted GoA2 ATO starting from 1962 on the Hibiya Line between Minami-Senju and Iriya, and subsequently expanded to the entire line in 1970. TRTA 3000 series set 3015 was the first train retrofitted with ATO running, while new trains ordered after 1963 were built-new with ATO. The pilot reportedly lasted until the end of 1987, after which the trains reverted to manual operation. The Hibiya Line pilot was then use as the basis for equipping the Namboku Line, opened in stages between 1991 and 2000, with GoA2 ATO. Sendai Subway Namboku Line, opened in 1987, was the first subway line in the world to use fuzzy logic, developed by Hitachi, to automate the operation of trains at GoA2 level, accounting for the relative smoothness of the starts and stops when compared to other systems at that time, and was stated to be 10% more energy efficient than human-controlled acceleration. Many subway and conventional railway lines in Japan use GoA2 ATO, in some implementations distinguishing the ATO systems' auto-acceleration function with the indigenously developed TASC auto-braking system, which the latter would theoretically still be able to function without driver input if the former malfunctions. Port Island Line and Rokkō Island Line of Kobe New Transit, opened in 1981 and 1990 respectively, as well as Disney Resort Line monorail of Tokyo Disney Resort, opened in 2001, use GoA 3(+), while people mover systems such as the Yurikamome line in Tokyo, opened in 1995, and the Linimo low-speed maglev line in Aichi Prefecture, opened in 2005, use GoA 4.

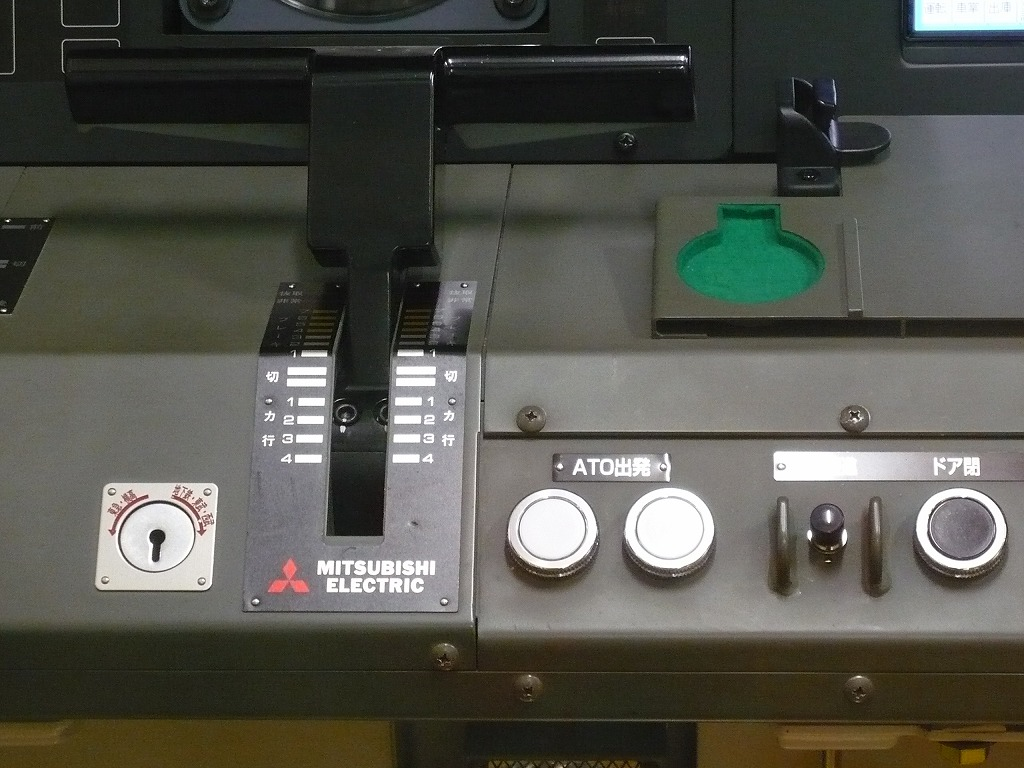
The two white ATO start buttons beside the power/brake lever in a Tokyo Metro 10000 series train, corresponding to GoA 2 operation

The Lille VAL system is considered the first real automated metro system, https://www.youtube.com/watch?v=M-3izcVhfN8

In 1976, for the Montreal Olympics, build by Bombardier, the new metro stock was fully automated.

== Other versions ==
=== Busan Metro and Seoul Subway Lines ===
Busan Metro Line 1 was the first line in the Korean Peninsula to feature a GoA 2 ATO system upon its opening in 1985. This was followed by Seoul Subway Lines 5, 7 and 8 in 1996, Daegu Metro Line 1 in 1997, Incheon Subway Line 1 in 1999, Seoul Subway Line 6 in 2000. Gwangju Metro Line 1 in 2004 and Daejeon Metro Line 1 in 2006. Seoul Subway Line 2 introduced GoA 2 operation using an ATO system developed by Siemens in 2011. Currently, six Seoul Subway lines, three Busan Metro lines and all Daegu, Daejeon and Gwangju Metro lines, as well as the AREX and Seohae Line are operated with GoA 2 ATO, while Busan Metro Line 4, Gimpo Goldline, Incheon Airport Maglev, Incheon Subway Line 2, Shinbundang Line and U Line are operated using GoA 4 ATO.

=== London: Thameslink and Elizabeth Line ===
In the United Kingdom, the Thameslink core section through Central London between St Pancras and Blackfriars became the first ATO route on the National Rail network in 2018. This has since been extended south from Blackfriars to London Bridge. The Elizabeth line, which opened in 2022 as the central element of the Crossrail project, is equipped with the ATO-supported Siemens Trainguard MT CBTC on its core central section between London Paddington station and Abbey Wood railway station, while the branch to Heathrow Airport is fitted with ETCS Level 2 superimposed with ATO, as well as the section of the Great Western Main Line from Paddington to Heathrow Airport Junction overlaid on top of the existing TPWS and AWS safety systems.

=== Linienzugbeeinflussung ===
German ICE high-speed lines equipped with the Linienzugbeeinflussung (LZB) signalling system support a form of GoA 2 ATO operation called AFB (Automatische Fahr- und Bremssteuerung, lit. automatic driving and braking control) which enables the driver to let the on-board train computer drive the train on autopilot, automatically driving at the maximum speed currently allowed by LZB signalling. In this mode, the driver only monitors the train and watches for unexpected obstacles on the tracks. On lines equipped with only PZB/Indusi, AFB acts entirely as a speed cruise control, driving according to the speed set by the driver with manual braking if needed.

=== CR400BF-C ===
CR400BF-C 'Fuxing Hao', a variant of CR400 Fuxing series, running on Beijing–Zhangjiakou intercity railway is said to be the world first high-speed rail service capable of driverless automation in commercial operations. The specific Grade of Automation (GoA) was not announced.

== See also ==
- History of self-driving cars
- List of defunct automated train systems
