= Automatic train operation =

Types, methods and safety

Automatic train operation (ATO) is a method of operating trains automatically where the driver is not required or is required for supervision at most. Alternatively, ATO can be defined as a subsystem within the automatic train control, which performs any or all of functions like programmed stopping, speed adjusting, door operation, and similar otherwise assigned to the train operator.

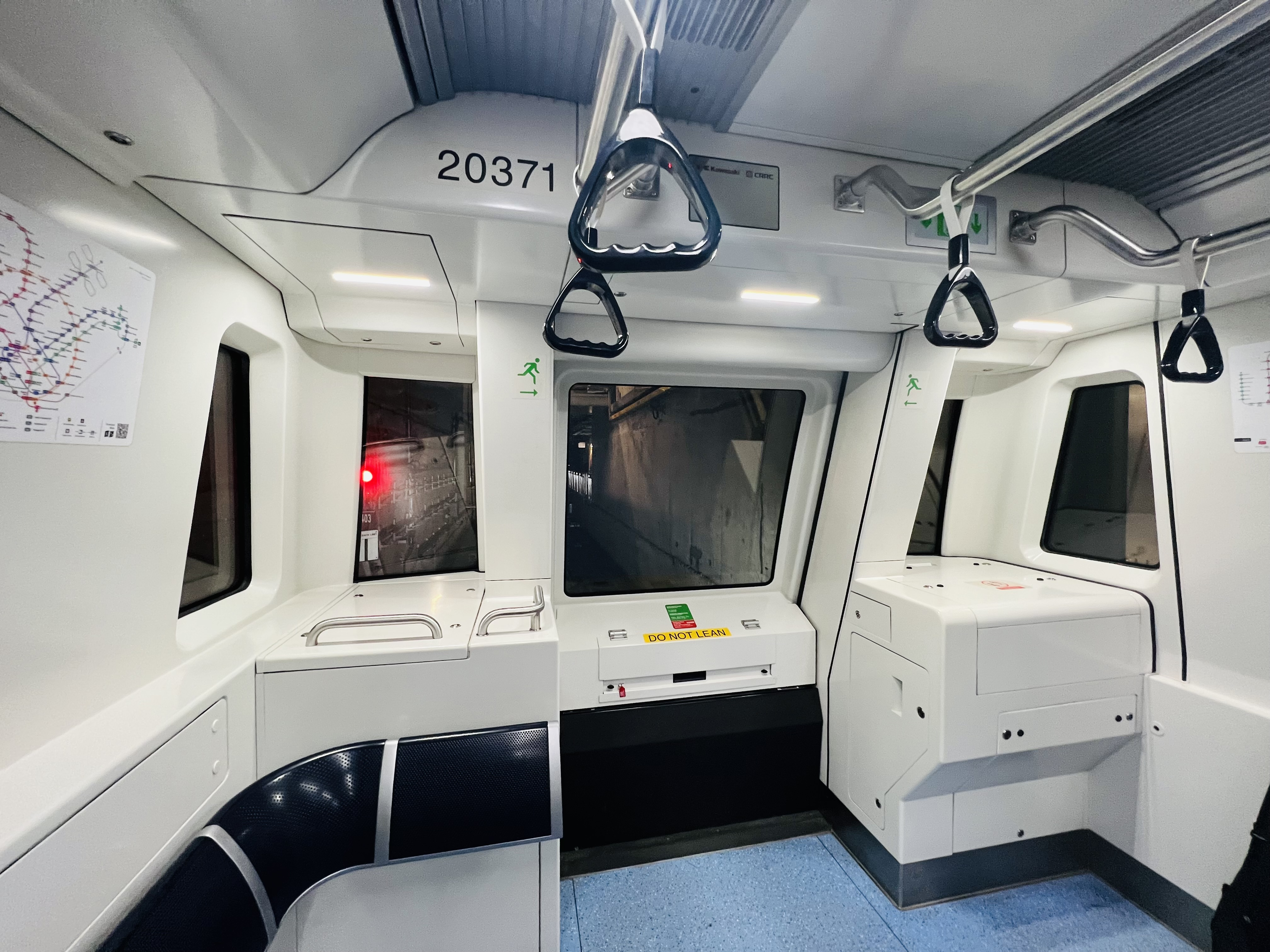
Pictured is a train cab of a Kawasaki–CRRC Sifang T251 train serving the Mass Rapid Transit's Thomson–East Coast Line in Singapore. This line runs under ATO GoA 4, which is automatically controlled without any on-board staff.

The degree of automation is indicated by the Grade of Automation (GoA), up to GoA4 in which the train is automatically controlled without any staff on board. On most systems for lower grades of automation up to GoA2, there is a driver present to mitigate risks associated with failures or emergencies. Driverless automation is primarily used on automated guideway transit systems where it is easier to ensure the safety due to isolated tracks. Fully automated trains for mainline railways are an area of research. The first driverless experiments in the history of train automation date back to 1920s.

== Grades of automation ==
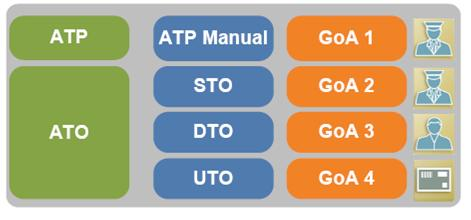
A diagram representing the different levels of automation possible on railways

Operation scheme of ETCS Level 3 as an example for GoA2

According to the International Association of Public Transport (UITP) and the international standard IEC 62290-1, there are five Grades of Automation (GoA) of trains. These levels correspond with the automotive SAE J3016 classification:

Grade of automation	Train operation	Description and examples	SAE levels
GoA0	On-sight	No automation	0
GoA1	Manual	A train driver controls starting and stopping, operation of doors and handling of emergencies or sudden diversions. Overseen signals due to human errors are safeguarded by train protection systems like ETCS L1.	1
GoA2	Semi-automatic (STO)	Starting and stopping are automated using advanced train protection systems like ETCS L2 or 3, but a driver operates the doors, drives the train if needed and handles emergencies. Many ATO systems are GoA2. In this system, trains run automatically from station to station but a driver is in the cab, with responsibility for door closing, obstacle detection on the track in front of the train and handling of emergency situations. As in a GoA3 system, the GoA2 train cannot operate safely without the staff member on board. Examples include the London Underground's Victoria line and New York City Subway's 7 route.	2
GoA3	Driverless (DTO)	Starting and stopping are automated, but a train attendant operates the doors and drives the train in case of emergencies. In this system, trains run automatically from station to station but a staff member is always in the train, with responsibility for handling of emergency situations. In a GoA3 system, the train cannot operate safely without the staff member on board. Examples include the Docklands Light Railway.	3 and 4
GoA4	Unattended (UTO) or Manless (MTO)	Starting, stopping and operation of doors are all fully automated without any on-train staff. It is recommended that stations have platform screen doors installed. In this system, trains are capable of operating automatically at all times, including door closing, obstacle detection and emergency situations. On-board staff may be provided for other purposes, e.g. customer service, but are not required for safe operation. Controls are often provided to drive the train manually in the event of a computer failure. CBTC is considered a basic enabler technology for GoA4. Examples include the Delhi Metro, Bangalore Metro, Vancouver Skytrain, South Island line and the Thessaloniki Metro.	

=== Additional types ===
Grade of automation	Description and examples
GoA1+	In addition to GoA1, there is connected on-board train energy optimisation (C-DAS) over ETCS.
GoA2+	In case of Amsterdam Metro, a GoA2 is able to reverse in GoA4 at the final stations. This is indicated by '+'. GoA2+ is also present on Bucharest Metro line M5, which uses the same URBALIS 400 CBTC as Amsterdam.
GoA2(+)	This is GoA2 with additional functions related to metre-gauge railway.
GoA2.5	In Japan, this is a form of "driverless operation with an attendant" where the attendant sits in the cab and is responsible for detecting obstacles and making emergency stops in addition to other duties of a GoA3 attendant. Kyushu Railway Company started one of the first revenue demonstration runs of GoA2.5-ready system on the Kashii Line (between Saitozaki and Kashii Stations) on December 24, 2020 while still posting drivers on the train and has since started regular revenue operation without drivers on the entire Kashii Line and beyond.
GoA3+	An umbrella term for GoA3 and GoA4 meaning replacement of human train driver. The terms GoA3/4, GoA3,4 and autonomous trains are used synonymously.

== Operation of ATO ==
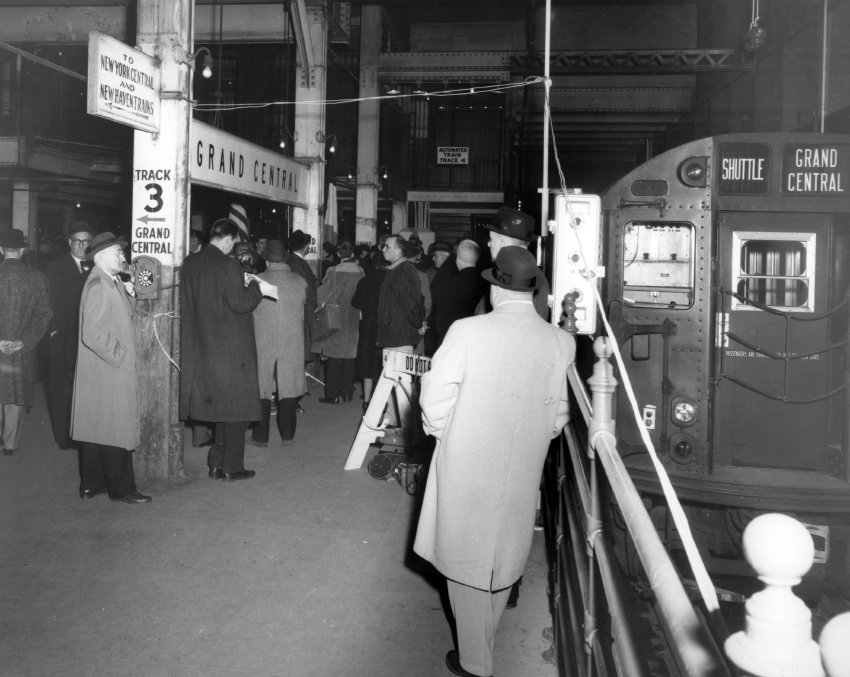
Early ATO trial on a R22 train at track 4 of the 42nd Street Shuttle (right) in 1962

Many modern systems are linked with automatic train protection (ATP) and, in many cases, automatic train control (ATC) where normal signaling operations such as route setting and train regulation are carried out by the system. The ATC and ATP systems will work together to maintain a train within a defined tolerance of its timetable. The combined system will marginally adjust operating parameters such as the ratio of power to coasting when moving and station dwell time in order to adhere to a defined timetable.

Whereas ATP is the safety system that ensures a safe spacing between trains and provides sufficient warning as to when to stop. ATO is the "non-safety" part of train operation related to station stops and starts, and indicates the stopping position for the train once the ATP has confirmed that the line is clear.

The train approaches the station under clear signals, so it can do a normal run-in. When it reaches the first beacon – originally a looped cable, now usually a fixed transponder – a station brake command is received by the train. The on-board computer calculates the braking curve to enable it to stop at the correct point, and as the train runs in towards the platform, the curve is updated a number of times (which varies from system to system) to ensure accuracy.

When the train has stopped, it verifies that its brakes are applied and checks that it has stopped within the door-enabling loops. These loops verify the position of the train relative to the platform and which side the doors should open. Once all this is complete, the ATO will open the doors. After a set time, predetermined or varied by the control centre as required, the ATO will close the doors and automatically restart the train if the door closed proving circuit is complete. Some systems have platform screen doors as well. ATO will also provide a signal for these to open once it has completed the on-board checking procedure. Although described here as an ATO function, door enabling at stations is often incorporated as part of the ATP equipment because it is regarded as a "vital" system and requires the same safety validation processes as ATP.

Once door operation is completed, ATO will accelerate the train to its cruising speed, allow it to coast to the next station brake command beacon and then brake into the next station, assuming no intervention by the ATP system.

=== Advantages of GoA3+ ===
In 2021, the Florida Department of Transportation funded a review by scientists from Florida State University, University of Talca and Hong Kong Polytechnic University, which showed the following advantages of autonomous trains:

1. Eliminating human sources of errors
2. Increasing capacity by stronger utilisation of existing rail tracks
3. Reduction of operational costs. Paris Métro reduced its operational costs in case of GoA 4 by 30%.
4. Increasing overall service reliability
5. Improving fleet management and service flexibility
6. Increasing energy efficiency

=== Accidents and incidents involving ATO ===
While ATO has been proven to drastically reduce the chance of human errors in railway operation, there have been a few notable accidents involving ATO systems:

Year	Territory	Incident
1993	Japan	On 5 October 1993, an automated Nankō Port Town Line train overran the line's southern terminus at Suminoekōen Station and collided with a buffer stop, injuring 217 people. The cause was believed to have been a malfunction in some of the relays in the line's ATO equipment that transmits the brake command signal, causing the brakes to not operate. Operations resumed on 19 November 1993 after redundancy equipment was installed and tested on the line.
2011	China	On 27 September 2011 at 14:51 hours local time (06:51 hours UTC), two trains on Shanghai Metro Line 10 collided between Yuyuan Garden station and Laoximen station, injuring 284–300 people. Initial investigations found that train operators violated regulations while operating the trains manually after a loss of power on the line caused its ATO and signalling systems to fail. No deaths were reported.
2015	Mexico	On 4 May 2015, at around 18:00 hours local time (00:00 hours UTC) during heavy rain with hail, two trains crashed at Oceanía station on Mexico City Metro Line 5 while both were heading toward Politécnico station. The first train, No. 4, was parked at the end of Oceanía station's platform after the driver reported that a plywood board was obstructing the tracks. The second train, No. 5, left Terminal Aérea station with the analogue PA-135 ATO system turned on despite the driver being asked to turn it off and to operate the train manually, as the protocol requests it when it rains because trains have to drive with reduced speed. Train No. 5 crashed into Train No. 4 at 31.8 km/h (19.8 mph) – double the average on arrival at the platforms – and left twelve people injured.
2017	Singapore	Joo Koon rail accident – on 15 November 2017 at about 08:30 hours local time (00:30 hours UTC), one SMRT East-West Line C151A train rear-ended another C151A train at Joo Koon MRT station in Singapore, causing 38 injuries. At that time, the East-West Line was in the process of having its previous Westinghouse ATC fixed block signalling and associated ATO system replaced with the Thales SelTrac CBTC moving block signalling system. One of the trains involved had a safety protection feature removed when it went over a faulty signalling circuit as a fix for a known software bug, hence "bursting" the signalling bubble and leading to the collision.
2017	India	Before the prime minister was supposed to ride the train, a few days before the opening, a Delhi Metro train was undergoing ATO trials at the Kalindi Kunj Depot. As the train approached the buffer, it hit the buffers and derailed, hitting the front wall. The wall was eventually patched with bricks. However, it was eventually realized that the brakes were not applied by the train by default under the operation. This led to the trains being controlled by drivers until 2024, delaying the full UTO operations by seven years.
2019	Hong Kong	A similar incident as the above occurred on the MTR Tsuen Wan Line in Hong Kong on 18 March 2019, when two MTR M-Train EMUs crashed in the crossover track section between Admiralty and Central while MTR was testing a new version of the SelTrac train control system intended to replace the line's existing SACEM signalling system. There were no passengers aboard either train, although the operators of both trains were injured. Before the crash site had been cleaned up, all Tsuen Wan line trains terminated at Admiralty instead of Central. The same vendor also provided a similar signalling system in Singapore, which resulted in the Joo Koon rail accident in 2017. In July 2019, the Electrical and Mechanical Services Department (EMSD) published an investigation report into the incident and concluded that a programming error in the SelTrac signalling system led the ATP system to malfunction, resulting in the collision.
2021	Malaysia	2021 Kelana Jaya LRT collision in Kuala Lumpur, in which 213 people were injured due to human error. The controller and backup controller computer have failed, a train driver was called in to drive the train to the depot. The train driver drives in the opposite direction of the track, leading to a collision with a train. ATP was not triggered due to the train's disappearance from the system as a result of both computers failing.
2022	China	On 22 January 2022, an elder passenger was caught between the traindoor and screendoor in Qi'an Road station of Line 15 (Shanghai Metro). On seeing the situation, the staff misoperated the traindoor controlling system, allowing the screen door to isolate without detecting, causing the train to run a short while and fatally injuring the trapped passenger.
2023	Taiwan	On 10 May 2023, a construction crane fell onto the tracks of Taichung MRT Green line south of Feng-le Park metro station. The driverless train was stationary when the crane fell onto the tracks and the train proceeded to drive and collide into the obstacle. Train attendants contacted the control center about the fallen crane obstructing the track. However, it would require 20 seconds to activate the emergency brakes remotely, which was insufficient to prevent the collision.
2026	Germany	On 02 August 2026, two trains of Nurnberg U-Bahn collided during a shunting operation. It was a side collision.

== ATO standards ==
Code	Full title	Source
DIN EN 50126-2:2018-10	Railway Applications - The Specification and Demonstration of Reliability, Availability, Maintainability and Safety (RAMS)	
DIN EN 50129:2019-06	Railway applications - Communication, signalling and processing systems - Safety related electronic systems for signalling	
DIN SPEC 91516:2025-07	Human performance regarding the dynamic driving task for the specification of AI in ATO	
DIN DKE SPEC 99002:2025-03	Terminology - AI in railway applications	
DIN EN 50716:2024-09	Railway Applications - Requirements for software development	
DIN EN 61508-4:2011-02	Functional safety of electrical/electronic/programmable electronic safety-related systems - Part 4: Definitions and abbreviations	
DIN EN 62267:2010-07	Railway applications - Automated Urban Guided Transport (AUGT) - Safety requirements (IEC 62267:2009)	
DIN DKE SPEC 99004:2025-05	Specification of Operational Design Domain in Rail	
DIN VDE V 0831-101:2022-08	Electric signalling systems for railways - Part 101: Semi-quantitative processes for risk analysis of technical functions in railway signalling	
IEC 62279:2015-06	Railway applications - Communication, signalling and processing systems - Software for railway control and protection systems	
DIN SAE SPEC 91518:2026-01	STRADE: Metadata Standard for Traffic Scenes in Automated Driving and Traffic Safety	

== ATO research projects ==
Name	Start year	End year	Description	Country	Volume
SMARAGT		1999	Automatization of the Nuremberg U-Bahn	Germany	
RUBIN		2001	Automatization of the Nuremberg U-Bahn	Germany	
KOMPAS I	2001		Driverless operation on mainline railways	Germany	4.85 million €
AutoBAHN	2010	2014	Autonomous trains on existing regional railway lines	Austria	2.5 million €
RCAS		2010	Collision avoidance without permanent installations	Germany	
Le Train Autonome	2018	2023	Le Train Autonome	France	57 million €
RailDriVE®	2019		A test vehicle for road and rail	Germany	
KI-Lok	2021	2024	Safe AI for the rail	Germany	2.47 million €
SMART 2	2019	2022	Advanced integrated obstacle and track intrusion detection system for smart automation of rail transport	EU	1.7 million €
ATO Risk	2020	2023	Risk Acceptance Criteria for Automatic Train Operation	Germany	0.499 million €
ATO Sense	2020	2023	Functional requirements for sensors and logic of an ATO-System	Germany	1.176 million €
SAFEXPLAIN	2022	2025	Safe and Explainable Critical Embedded Systems based on AI	EU	3.891 million €
OSDAR23	2021	2021	Development of Datasets for Applications of Automated Driving in Railway Operations	Germany	0.089 million €
safe.trAIn	2022		Development of AI-Enabled Automated Trains	Germany	24 million €
Acceptance GoA3+	2022	2026	Stakeholder expectations and societal acceptance conditions in automated rail transport in GoA3+	Germany	0.624 million €
AutomatedTrain	2023		Fully automated staging and parking of trains	EU	42.6 million €
R2DATO	2023		Rail to Digital automated up to autonomous train operation	EU	160.8 million €
XRAISE	2023	2026	Safety argumentation by means of explainable AI for autonomous driving in railway operations	Germany	0.675 million €
ATO Endurance	2022	2024	ATO Endurance	Netherlands	
ATO Automatic Shunting	2022	2024	ATO Automatic Shunting	Netherlands	
DIGIRAIL	2025		ATO pilot project at Kouvola - Kotka - Hamina ETCS test track	Finland	
	2025	2028	Interpretable AI for Rail Applications	Germany	1.079 million €

== Future ==
In October 2021, the pilot project of the "world's first automated, driverless train" on regular tracks shared with other rail traffic was launched in Hamburg, Germany. The conventional, standard-track, non-metro train technology could, according to reports, theoretically be implemented for rail transport worldwide and is also substantially more energy efficient.

ATO was introduced on the London Underground's Circle, District, Hammersmith & City, and Metropolitan lines by 2022. ATO is used on parts of Crossrail. Trains on the central London section of Thameslink were the first to use ATO on the UK mainline railway network with ETCS Level 2.

In April 2022, JR West announced that they would test ATO on a 12-car W7 series Shinkansen train used on the Hokuriku Shinkansen at the Hakusan General Rolling Stock Yard during 2022.

All lines built for the new Sydney Metro feature driverless operation without any staff in attendance.

From 2012, the Toronto subway underwent signal upgrades in order to use ATO and ATC over the next decade. Work has been completed on sections Yonge–University line. The underground portion of Line 5 Eglinton was equipped with ATC and ATO in 2022. The underground portion will use a GoA2 system while the Eglinton Maintenance and Storage Facility will use a GoA4 system and travel driverless around the yard. The Ontario Line is proposed have a GoA4 driverless system and will open in 2030.

Since March 2021, SNCF and Hauts-de-France region have begun an experimentation with a French Regio 2N Class, equipped with sensors and software (fr).

In 2025, regular driverless passenger services on the line from Kopidlno to Dolní Bousov will be resumed by AŽD Praha.

The Vienna U-Bahn is scheduled to be equipped with driverless ATO in 2026 on the new U5 line.

In a pilot project of Digirail two Stadler FLIRT trainsets (Sm5) will be equipped with ATO (and ETCS) for testing purposes by Siemens Mobility.

== See also ==
- Automation of the London Underground
- Communications-based train control – A moving block signalling system that can be used to automate operation of trains
- One-person operation – A method of train operation, sometimes seen as an intermediate step towards greater automation
- Signaling of the New York City Subway#Automation
- Train automatic stopping controller – An automatic braking system used on some Japanese railway lines, can also be combined with ATO as its auto-braking function
- Vehicular automation
- Guided bus
- Autonomous Rapid Transit (ART)
