= Toshiyuki Shiga =

Japanese business executive (born 1953)

Toshiyuki Shiga 志賀 俊之
- Born: 16 September 1953 (age 72); Wakayama Prefecture, Japan
- Education: Osaka Prefecture University
- Occupation: Business Executive
- Years active: 1976–present
- Title: Chief Operating Officer of Nissan
- Term: 2005–2013

Toshiyuki Shiga (志賀 俊之, Shiga Toshiyuki; born 16 September 1953) is a Japanese business executive. He served as the chief operating officer of Nissan from 2005 to 2013.

== Early life and education ==
Shiga grew up in Wakayama Prefecture, Japan, into a family with its origins in Founder Yoshisuke Aikawa in Kanagawa-ku, Yokohama, in Japan. He studied Faculty of Economics at Osaka Prefecture University and joined Nissan in 1976.

== Involvement in Ghosn Allegations ==
In November 2018, Nissan fired Carlos Ghosn and Ghosn's top aide Greg Kelly after their arrests for alleged financial misconduct. Shiga announced in January 2019 that he would step down from Nissan's board of directors in June. In January 2021, Shiga testified in Japanese court, admitting to his role in hiding the amount of pay that Ghosn was receiving from Nissan, in an attempt to incentivize Ghosn to stay at the company. According to Shiga, Ghosn directed him to find a way for Ghosn to receive money in excess of his legally reported salary, after retirement, something that Shiga did despite recognizing the "legal risk" of doing so. Many employees testifying in the Ghosn trial described a company culture where Ghosn's orders were followed without question, and Shiga stated in court that "Carlos Ghosn is a world-class business leader and CEO."

Shiga stated that he regretted following Ghosn's directive, saying, "In my life, that one act has left me with a bitter taste. The memories have faded, but the bitter taste has never gone away."
