= Navia (vehicle) =

Electric vehicle

The Navia is an electric 10-passenger robo-driven vehicle made by France's Induct Technology. It operates at a maximum speed of 20 km/h (12.5 mph), using four lidar ("light detection and ranging") units, along with stereoscopic optical cameras, to generate a real-time 3D map of its surroundings. It does not require rails, overhead lines or other road changes.

It is being tested at campuses in Switzerland, the United Kingdom, and Singapore.

== Applications ==
Plans call for it to transport passengers between Singapore’s Nanyang Technological University (NTU) and JTC Corporation's CleanTech Park over a 2 km (1.2 mi) 2-km (1.2-mile) route. Passengers select their destination stop on a touchscreen display.
