= LUTZ Pathfinder =

The LUTZ Pathfinder is a prototype autonomous microcar. The two-seater prototype pod has been built by Coventry-based RDM Group, and was first shown to the public in February 2015.

The LUTZ (Low-carbon Urban Transport Zone) Pathfinder pod is part of the UK Government's Transport Systems Catapult Autodrive project, a £20 million project.

Three pods were tested initially in Milton Keynes during 2015 to ensure that they can comply with the Highway Code.

== Specification ==
The pod is a two-seater electric car with space for luggage. It has a limited top speed of 15 mph (24 km/h) and has a range of 40 miles (64 km) or can run for eight hours. The self-driving equipment includes 19 sensors, cameras, radar and Lidar. Users can hail them by using a smartphone app.

The autonomous control software is developed by Mobile Robotics Group from University of Oxford.

== Partners ==
The Lutz Pathfinder pod has been developed by the UK Automotive Council, Department for Business, Innovation and Skills and RDM Group.

== Public trials ==
The first trial of autonomous operation on a public road, with pedestrians, cycles and other vehicles, was conducted in Milton Keynes on 11 October 2016. The vehicles "operated as expected."
