= Made in Germany (disambiguation) =

Made in Germany is the mark affixed to products manufactured in Germany. It may also refer to:

- Made in Germany (film), a 1957 West German film directed by Wolfgang Schleif
- Made in Germany (Wanda Jackson album), a 1967 album by Wanda Jackson
- Made in Germany (Axel Rudi Pell album), a 1995 album by Axel Rudi Pell
- Made in Germany (Nena album), a 2009 album by Nena
- Made in Germany 1995–2011, a 2011 album by Rammstein
- MadeInGermany, a driverless car
