= Nena Live '98 =

Nena Live

Live album by Nena
- Released: 16 November 1998
- Recorded: 21–22 August 1998
- Venue: Rheinstadion, Düsseldorf
- Length: 64:51
- Language: German
- Label: Polydor
- Producer: Philipp Palm

Nena chronology
Wenn alles richtig ist, dann stimmt was nich (1998)	Nena Live (1998)	Chokmah (2001)

Nena live chronology
Nena Live (1995)	Nena Live (1998)	Nena feat. Nena Live (2003)

Nena Live, released on 16 November 1998, is a live recording by German pop singer Nena. It features a show performed at the Rheinstadion in Düsseldorf on 21 August 1998 (the last track, Pur's "Lena", here rendered as "Nena", was recorded the following evening). This is Nena's second live album and should be distinguished from Nenalive, the 1995 release with a similar title.

== Track listing ==
No.	Title	Studio version album	Length
1.	"Leuchtturm"	Nena (1983)	3:25
2.	"Jamma nich"	Jamma nich (1997)	2:32
3.	"Was hast du in meinem Traum gemacht"	Wenn alles richtig ist ... (1998)	4:22
4.	"Wenn wenigstens Sommer wär"	Wenn alles richtig ist ... (1998)	3:22
5.	"Dann fiel mir auf"	Wenn alles richtig ist ... (1998)	4:54
6.	"Was immer du tust"	Bongo Girl (1992)	4:12
7.	"? (Fragezeichen)"	? (Fragezeichen) (1984)	4:39
8.	"Das ist normal"	Wenn alles richtig ist ... (1998)	4:19
9.	"Es ist in Ordnung"	Wenn alles richtig ist ... (1998)	5:05
10.	"Nur geträumt"	Nena (1983)	5:16
11.	"Irgendwie, irgendwo, irgendwann"	Feuer und Flamme (1985)	6:46
12.	"99 Luftballons"	Nena (1983)	4:58
13.	"Abschied"	Wunder gescheh'n (1989)	6:06
14.	"Nena (Lena)" (feat. Pur)		4:50
