= Oldschool (Nena album) =

Studio album by Nena
- Released: 27 February 2015
- Length: 54:39
- Language: German
- Labels: The Laugh and Peas Company
- Producers: Herr Sorge; Dr. Zorn; Derek von Krogh

Nena chronology
Du bist gut (2012)	Oldschool (2015)	Live at SO36 (2016)

Singles from Oldschool
- 1. "Lieder von früher" Released: 9 January 2015; 2. "Berufsjugendlich" Released: 22 May 2015; 3. "Genau jetzt" Released: 8 April 2016

Oldschool is the twelfth studio album by German pop singer Nena, released on 27 February 2015. Having received some negative publicity at the time of the release of her previous album Du bist gut for refusing in interviews to talk about the 1980s, Nena chose to celebrate the past with her next studio album. The first single released from the album, "Lieder von früher" ("Songs from the Past"), enthuses about the pleasure of dancing to old records, and the title track (not to be confused with "Oldschool, Baby", Nena's 2002 duet with WestBam) happily reflects on Nena's being best known for a few songs from the 1980s. The album was produced by rapper Samy Deluxe and features a duet with Nena's eldest surviving son, Sakias. Although published on Nena's own record label, The Laugh and Peas Company, distribution rights were agreed with Sony Music, 22 years after the company dropped Nena as a recording artist following the indifferent performance of her second solo album Bongo Girl.

== Reception ==
Oldschool received a mixed reception.

Writing for the Süddeutsche newspaper online, Max Fellmann identifies the "common threads" of the album as, "Nena's age... the passing of time and the horror of how long ago the 80s are already". Describing the album as involving, "a bit too much computer", he identifies its highlight as "Berufsjugendlich" ("Professional Teen") which is, "so smart that you have to laugh", with a lyric which, "takes the wind out of the sails of any critic". A drawback, however, is that he could not "find the one really big hit even after repeated listening".

Laut.de maintained their record of excoriating Nena's work by awarding Oldschool one star out of five and describing it as an album, "bringing together things which should be separated as soon as possible", including Nena and the album's producer Samy Deluxe, "fifteen years too late". The reviewer did, however, admit to being taken aback by one track "Bruder" ("Brother"), a song about Nena's first son who died in 1989 at the age of 11 months. Of this song he wrote, "for one single time Nena allows a glimpse behind her eternal façade... for a moment the singer is genuine, quite herself and in this way arouses honest emotions".

In Musik Review, Thomas Meurer wrote that, despite having never liked Nena's voice, he was "pleasantly surprised by the album", especially, "the shreds of music, reminiscent of the good old Neue Deutsche Welle time".

An entirely positive review by Ingo Scheel appeared in n-tv Online, writing that, "Nena's voice sounds as fresh as in the days of aerobics and the Rubik's Cube". He concludes, "as Nena says in the song "Ja das war's", sometimes everything was in vain, sometimes it was phenomenal – "Oldschool" is almost always close to the latter".

== Promotional tour ==
Nena promoted the release of Oldschool with a "clubtour" of 15 smaller venues (for 200 to 700 people) over 21 days in March 2015. Although the tour was billed as a return to the club scene after a 30-year absence, Nena had in fact performed very occasionally at smaller venues during that period (such as her 2010 appearance at the Garage club in London). The "clubtour" setlist comprised the very old and the very new, namely the entire Oldschool album together with ten of her greatest hits and most popular tracks from the 1970s and 1980s and just one song ("Willst du mit mir gehn") from the 25 years in between. Her band included three of her children, with youngest son Simeon making his stage debut on keyboards. A recording of one of these concerts – at the SO36 club in Berlin on 4 March 2015 – was released as Nena's 6th live album Live at SO36 on 4 March 2016, exactly one year later.

The concerts received overwhelmingly positive reviews, the common theme being the success of what Bild described as, "the mix of old school and new, pop, funk, new wave and '80s feeling". Writing for the Berliner Morgenpost, Peter Müller described Nena as "the complete sovereign entertainer... enjoying every moment... and constantly in motion", and delighting her audience with a performance that was, "simply oldschool but with both feet in the present".

== Chart performance ==
Oldschool entered the German charts at number 4, maintaining Nena's record of studio albums since her 2002 "comeback" all reaching the top 6 in her homeland. In April 2016, almost one year after the end of the album's first spell in the German charts, Oldschool re-entered the hit list, rising to number 28, on the back of Nena's first appearance in the TV series "Sing meinen Song – Das Tauschkonzert" and of a TV documentary charting her career the same evening, both programs coinciding with the release of the album's 3rd single, "Genau jetzt" ("Right Now"). Outside Germany, Oldschool's performance was also in keeping with Nena's post 2002 record, reaching the Top 10 of the Austrian charts and the Top 20 of the Swiss charts, peaking at numbers 10 and 19 respectively. As in Germany, it re-entered the Swiss and Austrian charts in April 2016.

The chart performance of Oldschool's songs, however, was unlike any other Nena album's. While usually the later singles of a Nena album were less successful than the first one, sometimes even failing to chart, with Oldschool, the third and final single "Genau jetzt" ("Right Now") was the only single from the album to chart at all. It returned Nena to both the Swiss singles chart and the German Top 30 for the first time in six years. The first single, "Lieder von früher" ("Songs from the Past") failed to chart anywhere, the first such failure for the initial release from a Nena album since the 1994 album Und alles dreht sich. "Berufsjugendlich" ("Wannabe Teenager") equally failed.

Another track from the album, "Magie" ("Magic"), even though it was not released as a single, contrived to enter the lower echelons of the German chart by virtue of the number of downloads stimulated by its exposure as the theme tune to the German TV series "Deutschlands schönste Frau" ("Germany's Most Beautiful Woman"). This makes it the only Nena song to chart without being released as a single.

== Track listing ==
All tracks are written by Samy Sorge (Samy Deluxe), Jan van der Toorn, Derek von Krogh and Nena, except where noted.

Vinyl, CD and download
No.	Title	Writer(s)	Length
1.	"Oldschool"		2:43
2.	"Lieder von früher" (Songs From The Past)	Sorge, Toorn, Krogh, Nena, Jan Günther	3:00
3.	"Genau jetzt" (Right Now)		3:05
4.	"Ja das war's" (Yes That Was It)	Sorge, Toorn, Krogh, Nena, Thorsten Haas	2:37
5.	"Betonblock" (Concrete Block)		3:06
6.	"Mach doch was ich will" (Just Do What I Want; Only on Deluxe Edition)		3:00
7.	"Berufsjugendlich" (Wannabe Teenager)	Sorge, Toorn, Krogh, Nena, John Andrews	2:50
8.	"Sonnemond" (Sunmoon)	Sorge, Toorn, Krogh, Nena, Tony Brown	3:07
9.	"Jeden Tag" (Every Day)	Sorge, Toorn, Krogh, Nena, Günther	2:57
10.	"Ein Wort" (A Word; Only on Deluxe Edition)	Sorge, Toorn, Krogh, Nena, Til Schneider	3:24
11.	"Magie" (Magic)	Sorge, Toorn, Krogh, Nena, Vitor Soares	3:26
12.	"Kreis" (Circle; here: The world spins)		4:14
13.	"PI (Ich rechne mit allem)" (Pi I Calculate On Everything; Only on Deluxe Edition)	Krogh, Nena, Philipp Palm, Andrews, Toorn	5:11
14.	"Peter Pan"	Sorge, Toorn, Krogh, Nena, Niklas Widemann	4:04
15.	"Bruder" (Brother)	Sorge, Toorn, Krogh, Nena, Andrews	3:41
16.	"Schicksal" (Destiny)		4:14
17.	"Oldschool (extended ASD Mix)" (Only on Deluxe Edition)
18.	"Berufsjugendlich (Live)" (Only on MediaMarkt and Saturn Editions)

== Charts ==
Chart (2015)	Peak position
Austrian Albums (Ö3 Austria)	10
German Albums (Offizielle Top 100)	4
Swiss Albums (Schweizer Hitparade)	19
