= Chokmah (album) =

Studio album by Nena
- Released: 29 October 2001
- Genres: Pop rock, pop
- Length: 1:20:52
- Language: German
- Label: Eastwest
- Producer: Florian Sitzmann

Nena chronology
Nena Live (1998)	Chokmah (2001)	Nena feat. Nena (2002)

Singles from Chokmah
- 1. "Carpe diem" Released: 15 October 2001

Chokmah (Hebrew: חכמה for "wisdom", also transliterated as chokma, chokhmah or hokhmah) is the sixth studio album by German pop singer Nena, released on October 29, 2001. It received mixed reviews, the majority being positive. It spawned one successful single, "Carpe diem", and foreshadowed the comeback Nena achieved with her next album, Nena feat. Nena.

== Background ==
During the 1990s Nena had released four rock and pop studio albums which had failed to bring her anything approaching the commercial success she had enjoyed in the 1980s. Nena had written several songs between 1999 and 2001 and originally planned to record them for her upcoming album. However, Florian Sitzmann convinced her to start composing new songs with him, which resulted in an album that was quite different from her past material. In the end, two songs from Nena's original plan ("Ich hör mir zu" and "Dafür ist das Leben zu kurz") were recorded for the album and two further songs ("Kann schon sein" and "Silbermond") were newly composed with lyrics from her original plan. The change which was the album Chokmah is symbolised by its cover: the smiling bouncy Nena of her 1990s album covers replaced by someone altogether more sultry and static. More significantly Chokmah replaces (mainly cheerful) rock and pop with (mainly sombre) technopop and a dash of reggae.

Chokmah entered the German album chart promisingly at No. 18 but then descended rapidly, spending only four weeks on the charts. The sole single released from the album ("Carpe diem", jointly written by Nena and her partner Philipp Palm) only managed No. 66 in the German charts.

== Title track ==
At her official website, Nena recollects:

Florian [Sitzmann] has been sitting in the studio and creating this track. There was only one line for this song for days: "That shocked my system" ("Das schockt mein System" ). Therein the word Chokmah is somehow contained. Chokmah comes from Hebrew and is one of the forms of energy on the [kabbalistic] Tree of Life. This energy form stands for change and reprogramming. But the word Chokmah also stands for allowing this change. That way the word gets an incredibly beautiful and exciting sound and expression. Chokmah stands by itself, let it affect you.

Original text (in German)
Florian hat im Studio gesessen und an diesem Song gebastelt. Es gab tagelang nur eine Zeile zu diesem Lied: “Das schockt mein System”. Darin ist das Wort CHOKMAH irgendwie enthalten. CHOKMAH kommt aus dem hebräischen und ist eine Energieform aus dem Lebensbaum. Diese Energieform steht für Veränderung und Neuprogrammierung. Aber das Wort CHOKMAH steht auch dafür, dass man diese Veränderung zulässt. Dadurch bekommt dieses Wort einen für mich unheimlich schönen und spannenden Klang und Ausdruck. CHOKMAH steht für sich, lass es auf dich wirken.

— Nena, on the title track of the Chokmah album

== Chokmah's significance in Nena's career ==
As Nena said at the time of its release, Chokmah did not mark a permanent change in direction but its technopop style has intermittently recurred in her work ever since. Most immediately came the reworking of "Ich häng immer noch an dir" in the following studio album Nena feat. Nena and most recently the title track of her 2012 album Du bist gut. Nena has also periodically collaborated with technopop and reggae artists such as WestBam, the Sam Ragga band, Die Atzen (on the single "Strobo Pop"), and TokTok.

The ongoing afterlife of Chokmah has continued most directly in the reappearances of some of its tracks. This stands in stark contrast to the fate of virtually all her 1990s output, which has been almost totally absent from both her live concerts and the various reworkings of older material which have been a feature of Nena's work in the 21st century. Only one year after Chokmah's release two tracks were selected for the follow-up album Nena feat. Nena; another ("Lass die Leinen los") appeared on Made in Germany Live and most recently "Ich hör mir zu" was the only reworking in the standard edition of her 2012 album Du bist gut. And when in 2010 Nena finally got to release a compilation album of songs which she, as opposed to her record company, had selected, the Chokmah track "Silbermond" appeared.

Perhaps most tellingly, however, Chokmah's fleeting but relatively high entry in the German album charts (the highest place Nena had attained in either singles or albums chart since the end of her heyday, 16 years earlier) suggests that there may have been a renewed appetite for Nena's music albeit perhaps for material not as unexpected as Chokmah. If this were the message, then Nena acted upon it perfectly. For her follow-up album she deployed the much less adventurous tactic of re-recording her best known 1980s songs and the resultant album Nena feat. Nena relaunched her career in the German-speaking countries.

== Track listing ==
All lyrics are written by Nena, except where noted.

No.	Title	Music	Title translation	Length
1.	"Chokmah"	Florian Sitzmann	Hebrew: "Wisdom"	4:27
2.	"Heute hab ich die Sonne mit dem Mond verwechselt"	Sitzmann, Nena	"Today I've Confused the Sun with the Moon"	4:10
3.	"Carpe diem" (Lyrics by: Sitzmann, Nena, Philipp Palm)	Sitzmann, Nena	Latin: "Seize the Day"	4:41
4.	"Lass die Leinen los"	Sitzmann, Nena, Ralf Gustke	"Let the Cast Off"	5:19
5.	"Ich hör mir zu"	Nena	"I Listen to Myself"	3:58
6.	"Lichtarbeiter"	Sitzmann	"Lightworker"	4:49
7.	"Rede lieber nicht zu viel" (Lyrics by: Herbert Schwamborn, Nena)	Sitzmann	"Better Don't Talk Too Much"	4:49
8.	"Kann schon sein"	Sitzmann	"That Could Be"	4:02
9.	"Silbermond" (Lyrics by: Daniel Biscan, Nena)	Sitzmann	"Silvermoon"	5:39
10.	"Club der Leisen"	Sitzmann, Jörg Dudys, Robbee Mariano, Van Romaine	"Club of the Quiet"	6:08
11.	"Du gibst"	Tino Oac	"You Give"	4:16
12.	"Leuchtturm 2001"	Uwe Fahrenkrog, Nena	"Lighthouse"	3:29
13.	"Dafür ist das Leben zu kurz"	Nena	"Life Is Too Short for That"	5:48
14.	"Carpe diem" (Söhne Mannheims Dancehall Mix)	Sitzmann, Nena	Latin: "Seize the Day"	3:40
15.	"Ich hab's geahnt" (Hidden track)		"I Have Suspected"	4:04

== Charts ==
Chart (2001–03)	Peak position
Austrian Albums (Ö3 Austria)	67
German Albums (Offizielle Top 100)	18
