= 99 Luftballons (album) =

Compilation album by Nena
- Released: April 1984
- Recorded: 1983–84
- Studios: Spliff Studio, West Berlin
- Genres: Neue Deutsche Welle; synth-pop
- Length: 40:55
- Languages: English, German
- Label: Epic
- Producers: Reinhold Heil, Manfred Praeker

Nena chronology
? (Fragezeichen) (1984)	99 Luftballons (1984)	Feuer und Flamme (1985)

Alternative cover

Singles from 99 Luftballons
- 1. "99 Red Balloons" Released: 1984; 2. "Just a Dream" Released: 1984; 3. "? (Question Mark)" Released: 1984; 4. "Kino (At the Movies)" Released: 1984

Professional ratings
Review scores
Source	Rating
Allmusic	4/5 stars

99 Luftballons (German for "99 Balloons"), also known as International Album, is a compilation album by German pop band Nena, released in April 1984. It was their first album released worldwide following the success of "99 Luftballons" and also the first with English lyrics.

== Alternate versions ==
The most widely known cover of this album is identical to the one used for most versions of the single "99 Luftballons" or "99 Red Balloons". The album was also released as Nena or International Album; this version used the same cover, but with "99 Luftballons" removed, and sometimes with additional sticker at upper left that says "International Album incl. Club-Mix - 99 Red Balloons". In Japan the first release was the original German language version, which was followed in April by the international version, which featured the extended Club Mix version of "99 Red Balloons" and was retitled as 99 Luftballons: First America. This had an alternate cover which featured the band pictured on a white background, which photo in various releases is the same or similar to the one on the single "Rette mich".

== Songs ==
The album is composed of tracks released on the band's two previous albums, Nena (1983) and ? (Fragezeichen) (1984), five of which are English-translated versions. "99 Red Balloons" ("99 Luftballons"), "Just a Dream" ("Nur geträumt"), "Kino", "Leuchtturm" and "99 Luftballons" were taken from Nena (1983), while "? (Question Mark)" ("? (Fragezeichen)"), "Hangin' on You" ("Ich häng' an dir"), "Let Me Be Your Pirate" ("Lass mich dein Pirat sein"), "Das Land der Elefanten", "Rette mich" and "Unerkannt durch's Märchenland" were taken from ? (Fragezeichen) (1984).

The lead single, "99 Luftballons", is the band's and lead singer Nena's most successful song to date. It reached number one in several countries worldwide, but is considered a one-hit wonder as other singles and albums performed poorly outside of Europe. "Just a Dream" reached number 70 on the UK Singles Chart. "Kino" was initially released on the album in German, but was translated into English titled as "Kino (At the Movies)". Like its predecessor, "? (Question Mark)", the single failed to chart. The song was later included as a bonus track on a re-release of the band's second English album It's All in the Game (1985).

== Track listing ==
Side A contains tracks 1 to 5 and side B contains tracks 6 to 11.

No.	Title	Writer(s)	German title	Length
1.	"99 Red Balloons"	Kevin McAlea (English), Jörn-Uwe Fahrenkrog-Petersen, Carlo Karges	"99 Luftballons"	3:50
2.	"? (Question Mark)"	Roy Brown (English), Fahrenkrog, Nena Kerner	"? (Fragezeichen)"	4:26
3.	"Hangin' on You"	Brown (English), Fahrenkrog, Kerner	"Ich häng' an dir"	4:13
4.	"Just a Dream"	Julian Dawson (English), Fahrenkrog, Kerner, Rolf Brendel	"Nur geträumt"	3:30
5.	"Let Me Be Your Pirate"	Brown (English), Kerner, Brendel	"Lass mich dein Pirat sein"	4:51
6.	"Kino" (At the Movies)	Brendel		2:42
7.	"Das Land der Elefanten" (The Land of the Elephants)	Fahrenkrog, Karges		3:42
8.	"Leuchtturm" (Lighthouse)	Fahrenkrog, Kerner		3:14
9.	"Rette mich" (Rescue Me)	Karges		3:17
10.	"Unerkannt durch's Märchenland" (Unrecognized Through Fairyland)	Jürgen Dehmel, Kerner		3:21
11.	"99 Luftballons" (99 Red Balloons)	Fahrenkrog, Karges		3:50
Total length:				40:55

Notes

- UK, European and Israeli releases, titled simply Nena, replaced the single version of "99 Red Balloons" with the extended "Club Mix" (running 4:43 in length). North and South American, Asian and Australasian releases, titled 99 Luftballons, featured the original single version.
- CD versions of the album also replace the single version of "99 Red Balloons" (Track 1) with the Club Mix (length 4:44). This change has been noted on some international pressings, but not on others. The correct version is available on the iTunes Store.
- Some releases erroneously printed "Das Land der Elefanten" as "Das Lang der Elefanten" and "Unerkannt durch's Märchenland" as "Unerkannt durch's Marchenland".
- The spelling of "durch's" instead of "durchs" in title that should be "Unerkannt durchs Märchenland" is an obvious error, too.
- The track list of the Spanish version is translated into Spanish.
- The track list of the Japanese version is partially written in katakana.

== Personnel ==
Credits adapted from Allmusic and Discogs.

=== Nena ===
- Nena Kerner – main vocals, arrangement
- Jörn-Uwe Fahrenkrog-Petersen – main vocals (on "Das Land der Elefanten"), backing vocals (on "? (Question Mark)" and "Kino"), keyboards
- Carlo Karges – guitar, backing vocals (on "Kino")
- Jürgen Dehmel – bass
- Rolf Brendel – drums, percussion

=== Technical personnel ===
- David Sanborn – saxophone (on "? (Question Mark)")
- Manfred "Manne" Praeker – production
- Reinhold Heil – production
- After Hours Studio – cover design
- Jim Rakete – photography

== Charts ==
Chart (1984)	Peak position
Australia (Kent Music Report)	25
Canada Top Albums/CDs (RPM)	10
German Albums Chart	23
Norwegian Albums Chart	16
Swedish Albums Chart	2
UK Albums Chart	31
US Billboard 200	27

== Certifications ==
Country (Provider)	Certification
Canada (MC)	Gold

== Release history ==
Region (Alternate release title)	Year	Label	Format	Catalog
Japan (First America)	1983	Epic	CD	35•8P-42
Japan (First America)	1984	Epic/Sony	LP	25•3P-501
United States	1984	Epic	LP	FE 39294
United States	1984	Epic	LP	BFE 39294
United States	1984	Epic	cassette	BET 39294
United States	1984	Epic	cassette	FET 39294
United Kingdom	1984	Epic	cassette	EPC 402592 5
India	1984	Epic	LP	EPIC 10106
Portugal	1984	Epic	LP	EPC25925
Europe (Nena: International Album)	1984	Epic	LP	EPC25925
New Zealand	1984	Epic	LP	ELPS 4425
Venezuela	1984	Epic	LP	EPIC 270
Canada	1984	Epic	LP	FE 39294
Brazil	1984	CBS	LP	144.818
Spain (99 Red Balloons)	1984	CBS	LP	S 25925
South Africa (99 Red Balloons)	1984	CBS	LP	ASF 2966
United States	1990	Epic	CD	EK 39294
Japan (First America)	2009	Sony Music; Entertainment; Japan	CD	SICP 2279
