= Live at SO36 =

Live album by Nena
- Released: 4 March 2016
- Recorded: 4 March 2015
- Venue: SO36
- Genre: Pop
- Length: 88:32
- Language: German
- Labels: The Laugh and Peas Company

Nena chronology
Oldschool (2015)	Live at SO36 (2016)	Nichts versäumt live (2018)

Nena live chronology
Made in Germany Live (2010)	Live at SO36 (2016)	Nichts versäumt live (2018)

Singles from Live at SO36
- 1. "Genau jetzt (live)" Released: 8 April 2016

Live at SO36 is the 6th live album of the German pop singer Nena. It comprises the recording of most of her concert performed at the SO36 club in Berlin on 4 March 2015 and was released exactly one year later on 4 March 2016.

== Background ==
Nena's association with the SO36 club goes back to the early 1980s when she lived in Berlin prior to becoming famous. In her 2005 memoirs "Willst du mit mir gehn", she describes it as being one of the three main places where she spent her weekends.

The sold-out concert on 4 March 2015 was part of a "clubtour" of smaller venues for audiences of 500 to 700 people aimed at promoting Nena's album Oldschool which had been released the previous month. Extracts of the video from the second single released from Oldschool, "Berufsjugendlich", had also been filmed at SO36. Live at SO36 reflects this with 11 of its 21 tracks being from Oldschool, the remainder being mainly Nena's most well known songs from the 1970s and 1980s and only one track ("Willst du mit mir gehn") from the intervening quarter of a century. Six tracks performed at the concert (including the other 5 tracks from Oldschool) were not included in the album.

== Critical reception ==
Live at SO36 was made "CD of the week" by Alster Radio but was negatively received by the music review website 'Laut.de' which gave it 2 out of 5 stars. Describing Nena concerts in the 21st century as, "nothing more than nostalgia trips", and referring to her, "unabated artistic decline continuing", Michael Schuh wrote of the enthusiastic audience, "It's like staring at the home shopping channel QVC, when you always ask yourself, 'How can they fall for this?'"

A more positive review in 'Leute.de' concludes that the album "is a fascinating live document ... that demonstrates the many facets of the NDW icon who stylistically oscillates here between pop, rock, indie and electro and who, with her outstanding live qualities, knows how to pamper in an intimate setting".

=== Concert acclaim ===
The SO36 concert on 4 March 2015 received generally positive reviews from local media at the time but the reception to the album a year later was more mixed.

For the Berliner Zeitung, Aleksandar Zivanovic wrote, "When it comes to not getting older, even Madonna can only look up to Nena... She jumps from left to right, her songs much better live than in any disco. The band play very precisely, Nena matches it and the audience have a good time, some cuddling, some already knowing the lyrics of her new songs."

Similarly Frank Thiessies for BZ referred to a "performance combining majesty and grass-roots" and "Nena's winning girlish personality". He went on to describe how, "The stage set shines in old Musikladen TV appearance, the eighties are more present than ever and suddenly SO36 is also again anchored in West Berlin."

Another positive review by Peter E Müller appeared in Morgenpost.de. "On Wednesday night, the eternal princess of the Neue Deutsche Welle came on stage with her musicians at a packed SO36 in Kreuzberg. And was euphorically celebrated." Müller found one fault as he described how, "Nena enjoys every minute, is driven by an over-excited restlessness, only making a mess – with a smile – of one verse of a new song."

Another favourable article was published by Der Tagesspiegel under the strapline, "whoever doesn't sing along has no voice". Esther Kogelboom wrote that, "The hall shakes with breathless emotion as, for the first time, Nena sings "Bruder", a song about the death of her first son Christopher, who died at eleven months... Scary how Nena recites its lines without choking. You wait for a stumble, a pause. There's no deviation, but a seamless transition to "Wunder gescheh'n", perhaps to avoid a reaction from the audience."

== Commercial performance ==
Live at SO36 entered and peaked at number 43 in the German charts, the second highest position achieved by Nena's six live albums. One of its tracks, "Genau jetzt (live)", was one of five versions of the song included on the EP which in April 2016 returned Nena to the German Top 30 singles chart for the first time in 6 years.

== Track listing ==
Vinyl, CD and download
No.	Title	Writer(s)	Studio version album	Length
1.	"Noch einmal"	Carlo Karges	Nena (1983)	4:32
2.	"Lieder von früher"	Herr Sorge, Jan van der Toorn, Nena, Jan Gunther	Oldschool (2015)	3:06
3.	"Ja das war's"	Sorge, Toorn, Krogh, Nena, Thorsten Haas	Oldschool (2015)	2:44
4.	"Betonblock"	Sorge, Toorn, Krogh, Nena	Oldschool (2015)	3:07
5.	"Kreis"	Sorge, Toorn, Krogh, Nena	Oldschool (2015)	3:50
6.	"Zaubertrick"	Jörn-Uwe Fahrenkrog-Petersen, Rolf Brendel	Nena (1983)	4:07
7.	"Ecstasy"	Frank Becking, Rainer Kitzmann	The Stripes (1980)	3:06
8.	"Nur geträumt"	Fahrenkrog, Nena, Brendel	Nena (1983)	4:52
9.	"Willst du mit mir gehn"	Nena, Fahrenkrog	Willst du mit mir gehn (2005)	4:31
10.	"Sonnemond"	Sorge, Toorn, Krogh, Nena, Tony Brown	Oldschool (2015)	3:11
11.	"Leuchtturm"	Fahrenkrog, Nena	Nena (1983)	6:09
12.	"Berufsjugendlich"	Sorge, Toorn, Krogh, Nena, John Andrews	Oldschool (2015)	3:05
13.	"99 Luftballons"	Karges, Fahrenkrog	Nena (1983)	4:20
14.	"Genau jetzt"	Sorge, Toorn, Krogh, Nena	Oldschool (2015)	4:07
15.	"PI (Ich rechne mit allem)"	Toorn, Krogh, Nena, Andrews, Philipp Palm	Oldschool (2015)	5:46
16.	"Peter Pan"	Sorge, Toorn, Krogh, Nena, Niklas Wildermann	Oldschool (2015)	4:00
17.	"Bruder"	Sorge, Toorn, Krogh, Nena, Andrews	Oldschool (2015)	3:40
18.	"Wunder gescheh'n"	Nena	Wunder gescheh'n (1989)	5:13
19.	"Irgendwie, irgendwo, irgendwann"	Karges, Fahrenkrog	Feuer und Flamme (1985)	4:09
20.	"Schicksal"	Sorge, Toorn, Krogh, Nena	Oldschool (2015)	4:19
21.	"Zusammen"	Karges	Eisbrecher (1986)	6:38
