= Und alles dreht sich =

Studio album by Nena
- Released: 7 April 1994
- Studios: Dolphin Studio, Mörfelden
- Length: 50:52
- Language: German
- Label: RMG Music Entertainment
- Producer: Gunther Mende

Nena chronology
Bongo Girl (1992)	Und alles dreht sich (1994)	Jamma nich (1997)

Singles from Und alles dreht sich
- 1. "Viel zuviel Glück" Released: 25 November 1993; 2. "Hol' mich zurück" Released: 24 March 1994; 3. "Ich halt' dich fest" Released: 7 July 1994

Und alles dreht sich ("And Everything's Spinning") is the third studio album by German pop singer Nena, released in 1994. It had moderate success in Germany. "Hol' mich zurück", "Viel zuviel Glück" and "Ich halt' dich fest" were released as singles.

== Background ==
Nena's third solo album Und alles dreht sich ("And Everything's Spinning") is aptly titled since it marked a turning point in both Nena's career and in her personal life.

Having separated from Benedict Freitag (the father of her first three children, the first of whom died at the age of 11 months), Nena had a two-month affair with the album's producer, Gunther Mende, during the recording of the album. Shortly after the album was released she met Philipp Palm, her current partner, who is 20 years younger than Freitag. By the time Nena was promoting the final single to be released from the album, she was already pregnant with their first child.

== Chart performance ==
The album represents the commercial low point of Nena's career. Following the modest success of its predecessor Bongo Girl, her record contract with Sony had not been renewed. Und alles dreht sich was therefore published by the relatively obscure label RMG Music Entertainment, which ceased trading shortly afterwards. The album remains the only Nena album neither to have made it to the Top 50 in her homeland, nor to have produced a single chart hit, however minor. Commercially her career thereafter marginally improved during the remainder of the 1990s before the 2002 album Nena feat. Nena relaunched her career.

Despite the lack of commercial success, the album contains many of the ingredients of Nena's success in the 21st century. Her voice had matured, the themes of the songs (concerns for the environment, relationships and positive spirituality as an antidote to self-doubt) recur throughout her work and in writing them she collaborated with former members of the Nena band. The album ends with the ethereal "Ich bin die Liebe", a song written by Carlo Karges (co-writer of Nena's best-known song, "99 Luftballons"). The lyrics comprise an inner conversation between Nena and a voice in her head, "Die Liebe" (Love). Nena sings the song in two different vocal styles in order to differentiate who is speaking. Eighteen years later the song has been reprised as one of the bonus tracks on her 2012 Du bist gut album. This latter rendition was, perhaps more appropriately, performed as a duet – Nena taking the part of Love, her son (Sakias) the role of the person uplifted by her advice.

== Track listing ==
No.	Title	Title translation	Length
1.	"Ich halt' dich fest"	"I Hold You Tight"	3:48
2.	"Hol' mich zurück"	"Get Me Back"	3:32
3.	"Weiße Wolke"	"White Cloud"	6:10
4.	"Vor deiner Tür"	"In Front of Your Door"	3:46
5.	"Heimweh nach gestern"	"Homesick for Yesterday"	3:56
6.	"Armer weißer Mann"	"Poor White Man"	4:06
7.	"Einmal noch und immer mehr"	"Once Again and Even More"	4:19
8.	"Wach' auf"	"Wake Up"	5:32
9.	"Touristen-Song"	"Tourist Song"	3:05
10.	"Viel zuviel Glück"	"Too Much Happiness"	4:00
11.	"Verzeih'"	"Forgive"	2:25
12.	"Ich bin die Liebe"	"I Am the Love"	6:11

== Charts ==
Chart (1994)	Peak position
German Albums (Offizielle Top 100)	53
