= Made in Germany Live =

Made In Germany Live

Live album by Nena
- Released: 17 September 2010
- Recorded: 2009–2010
- Genre: Pop rock, pop
- Length: 2:20:01 (special edition)

Nena chronology
Made in Germany (2009)	Made In Germany Live (2010)	Du bist gut (2012)

Nena live chronology
Nena Live Nena (2004)	Made in Germany Live (2010)	Live at SO36 (2016)

Made In Germany Live is a two-CD live album by German pop singer Nena, released on 17 September 2010. It contains her live performance at Berlin on 24 April 2010, with bonus tracks from concert dates in 2009 and 2010 on the special edition of the album. The bonus tracks include two songs by Nena’s first band, The Stripes. Of the 27 tracks featured in the album, 11 were from the “Made in Germany” album which the concert tour was promoting. Of the remaining 16, ten are songs from the 1980s and six from the 2000s, leaving Nena’s work from the 1990s (the most productive decade of her solo career in terms of new material) completely unrepresented.

== Track listing ==
CD 1

1. "Made in Germany" – 5:09
2. "SchönSchönSchön" – 4:21
3. "Nur geträumt" – 6:11
4. "Lass die Leinen los" – 4:53
5. "Wunder gescheh'n" – 5:55
6. "Geheimnis" – 3:09
7. "Wir sind wahr" – 5:32
8. "? (Fragezeichen)" – 4:27
9. "Tokyo" – 3:16
10. "Liebe ist" – 6:06
11. "Du bist so gut für mich" – 5:51
12. "Willst du mit mir geh'n?" – 5:14
13. "Ich bin hyperaktiv" – 6:36

CD 2

1. "Ganz viel Zeit" – 7:14
2. "99 Luftballons" – 4:23
3. "Leuchtturm / Haus der drei Sonnen"– 7:03
4. "Schmerzen" – 5:40
5. "In meinem Leben" – 7:27
6. "Nachts wenn es warm ist" – 5:50
7. "Irgendwie, irgendwo, irgendwann" – 4:34
8. "Der Anfang" – 10:54

Bonus tracks

1. "Strangers" – 2:57
2. "Ecstasy" – 3:09
3. "Engel der Nacht" – 2:55
4. "Du hast dich entschieden" – 3:27
5. "Heute hab ich die Sonne mit dem Mond verwechselt" – 3:30
6. "Liebe isch ..." – 3:53
