= Spirit of Berlin =

German driverless car

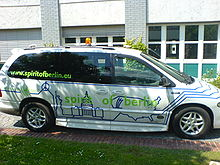
Spirit of Berlin

Spirit of Berlin was a driverless car developed by the Freie Universität Berlin, Germany.

The autonomous vehicle project by Freie Universität Berlin was initiated in 2007 with the participation in the DARPA Urban Challenge as Team Berlin, a joint team by the Freie Universität Berlin, Rice University, Fraunhofer Gesellschaft (IAIS), and industrial partners (Micro-Epsilon, Berlin Sciences, IBM Germany, IBEO). The participating vehicle Spirit of Berlin was a 2000 Dodge Caravan, retrofitted to be controlled autonomously by a computer. It finished the DARPA Urban Challenge as one of the semifinalists and demonstrated safe unmanned driving in urban traffic.

Spirit of Berlin has a modular sensor setup with most of its sensors mounted on top of the car on a flexible rack. Obstacle processing is done by a combination of Velodyne HDL-64E, Ibeo Alasca XT, Sick LMS, and stereo camera systems. In addition, the car localizes itself with an Applanix GPS/INS unit and RTK correction signals.

After the Urban Challenge the focus shifted to driving in heavy traffic in crowded city environments like Berlin, Germany, itself. Spirit of Berlin handled intercity traffic, traffic lights and roundabouts between International Congress Centrum and Brandenburg Gate. It was the first car licensed for autonomous driving on the streets and highways in Germany and financed by the German Federal Ministry of Education and Research.

Spirit of Berlin was also a test vehicle for semi-autonomous control, being remote controlled with an iPhone or iPad app, an eye tracking system or a Brain–computer interface. This allowed a half automated mode to be used for handicapped people to participate in normal traffic.

== See also ==
- Driverless car
- DARPA Grand Challenge
- DARPA Urban Challenge
- MadeInGermany
- ARGO Project on autonomous cars
- ELROB trials
