= Nena die Band =

Greatest hits album by Nena
- Released: 16 September 1991
- Recorded: 1982–1986
- Genre: NDW, pop rock, pop
- Length: 60:29
- Language: German
- Label: Epic

Nena (band) chronology
Eisbrecher (1986)	Nena die Band (1991)

Nena chronology
Wunder gescheh'n (1989)	Nena die Band (1991)	Bongo Girl (1992)

Singles from Nena die Band
- 1. "Lass mich dein Pirat sein (remix)" Released: 1991

Nena die Band is a best-of album by German pop group Nena, released in 1991. The first track, "Lass mich dein Pirat sein", is a remix. The version of "99 Luftballons" here combines the original recording with a live recording.

== Title ==
The dot (period) at the end, which is usually not included in titles, is emphasized with red on the album's cover. Furthermore, on the official Nena website, unlike other releases in catalogue, this particular album is consistently referred to as “Nena – Die Band.” (note the period again). This indicates the total end of the band's lifespan, in fact completed four years earlier. All subsequent releases under the name Nena, as well as previous album Wunder gescheh'n (1989), are solo albums of Nena Kerner.

== Track listing ==
No.	Title	Original release	Length
1.	"Lass mich dein Pirat sein" (1991 remix: "Let Me Be Your Pirate")	? (Fragezeichen) (1984)	3:56
2.	"Nur geträumt" ("Just a Dream")	Nena (1983)	3:41
3.	"Ganz oben" ("Right at the Top")	B-side to single "Nur geträumt" (1982)	3:30
4.	"Vollmond" ("Full Moon")	Nena (1983)	3:02
5.	"? (Fragezeichen)" ("Question Mark")	? (1984)	4:30
6.	"Rette mich" ("Rescue Me")	? (1984)	3:18
7.	"Irgendwie, irgendwo, irgendwann" ("Somehow, Somewhere, Sometime", aka "Anyplace, Anywhere, Anytime")	Feuer und Flamme (1985)	7:15
8.	"Du kennst die Liebe nicht" (single version: "You Don't Know What Love Is")	Single from Feuer und Flamme (1986)	3:45
9.	"Jetzt bist du weg" ("Now You Are Gone")	Eisbrecher (1986)	4:53
10.	"Tokyo"	Eisbrecher (1986)	4:28
11.	"99 Luftballons" ("99 Balloons", aka "99 Red Balloons")	Nena (1983)	3:48
12.	"Leuchtturm" (live version: "Lighthouse")	Nena (1983)	2:50
13.	"Unerkannt durch's Märchenland" (live version: "Unrecognized Through Fairyland")	? (1984)	3:12
14.	"Tanz auf dem Vulkan" (live version: "Dance on the Volcano", aka "Living on the Edge")	Nena (1983)	3:10
15.	"Satellitenstadt" (live version: "Satellite Town")	Nena (1983)	5:03

Tracks 12 and 15 recorded live in Offenbach on 2 April 1984. Tracks 13 and 14 recorded live in Hamburg on 26 March 1984.

The above track list represents the CD version of the album. LP edition omits "Ganz oben" and two of the four live tracks ("Unerkannt durchs Märchenland" and "Tanz auf dem Vulkan") but includes a very short 15-second track "Der Bus is' schon weg" (from ? (Fragezeichen), 1984).
