= MadeInGermany =

Autonomous car from FU Berlin and AutoNOMOS Labs

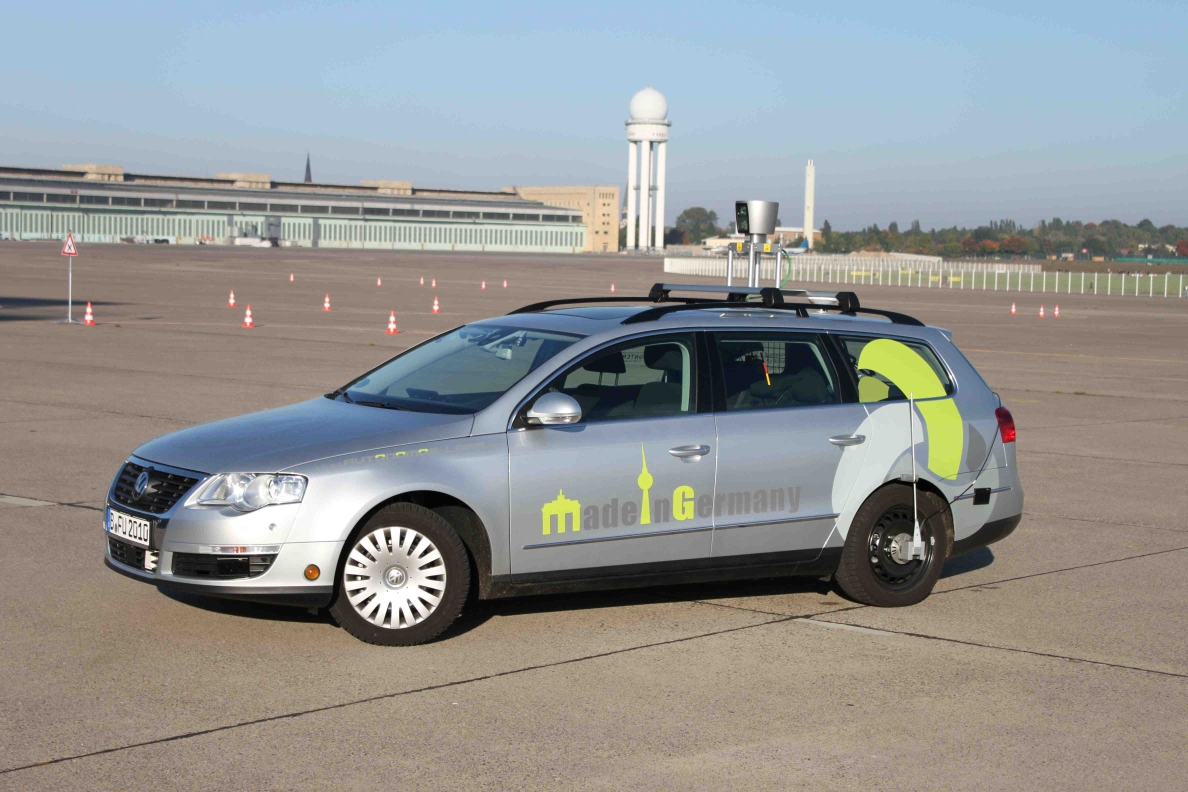
MadeInGermany

MadeInGermany was a driverless car developed by the Freie Universität Berlin and AutoNOMOS Labs in 2011.

MadeInGermany is a Volkswagen Passat Variant 3C with a built-in drive-by-wire control. It measures 4.7 m (15 ft) in length, 1.8 m (5.9 ft) in width, and 1.5 m (4.9 ft) in height with a total weight of 1.7 tons. Furthermore, it is equipped with a 2.0 liter Turbocharged Stratified Injection (TSI) engine. Parts of the CAN gateway interfaces have been opened by Volkswagen for research purposes so that a computer can access and control the car. In addition, various lidar and radar scanners are integrated into the vehicle's chassis without exceeding the ex factory measurements of the vehicle (except for the Velodyne sensor).

The sensor configuration is designed to have a 360-degree field of view around the car with redundant coverage. The Velodyne and six Ibeo LUX laser scanners cover almost any area around the car for up to 50 m (160 ft). In addition, radar sensors from TRW, Hella, and SMS support the sensor fusion process by adding accurate velocity information about surroundings objects. Camera sensors are used for lane detection, traffic light detection, and stereo vision.

After participating in the DARPA Urban Challenge, the research focus of Freie Universität Berlin shifted to driving in heavy traffic in crowded city environments like Berlin, Germany, itself. For this undertaking, a new vehicle has been designed to meet the criteria for a city approval to drive autonomously on real roads. The vehicle was named MadeInGermany and has driven over 3,000 km (1,900 mi) autonomously on Berlin's city roads and highways with no human intervention. The primary goal is to operate autonomously in urban environments with dense human traffic and obeying traffic regulations.

In order to obtain permission to drive autonomously and freely in daily traffic alongside other traffic participants, the sensors have been primarily mounted inside the car's body. MadeInGermany was also a test vehicle for semi-autonomous control, being remote-controlled with an iPad app or a brain–computer interface.

== See also ==
- DARPA Grand Challenge
- Spirit of Berlin
- ELROB trials
