= Liebe ist =

2005 single by Nena

Single by Nena

from the album Willst du mit mir gehn
- Language: German
- English title: "Love Is"
- B-side: "Ohne Liebe bin ich nichts"
- Released: 25 February 2005
- Length: 4:53
- Label: Warner
- Songwriters: Nena Kerner; Uwe Fahrenkrog-Petersen
- Producer: Uwe Fahrenkrog-Petersen

Nena singles chronology
"Nur geträumt 2002" (2003)	"Liebe ist" (2005)	"Willst du mit mir gehn" (2005)

"Liebe ist" (English: "Love Is") is a song by German recording artist Nena. It was co-written and produced along by Uwe Fahrenkrog-Petersen for her 13th studio album, Willst du mit mir gehn (2005). Selected as the album's lead single, it served as the theme song for the Sat.1 telenovela Verliebt in Berlin. Upon its release in February 2005, "Liebe ist" topped the German Singles Chart for two weeks, becoming Nena's second number-one hit, after 1983's "99 Luftballons", and her first chart-topper as a solo artist. The Bundesverband Musikindustrie (BVMI) awarded the song a gold certification for shipping 150,000 units in Germany alone. A remix of "Liebe ist" for American audiences was considered but never surfaced.

== Formats and track listings ==
German maxi-CD single
No.	Title	Length
1.	"Liebe ist" (radio version)	3:59
2.	"Liebe ist" (piano version)	5:11
3.	"Ohne Liebe bin ich nichts"	3:13
4.	"Liebe ist" (remix)	5:10
5.	"Liebe ist" (album version)	4:53

== Charts ==
=== Weekly charts ===
Chart (2005)	Peak position
Austria (Ö3 Austria Top 40)	2
Europe (Eurochart Hot 100)	5
Germany (GfK)	1
Netherlands (Single Top 100)	60
Switzerland (Schweizer Hitparade)	8

=== Year-end charts ===
Chart (2005)	Rank
Austria (Ö3 Austria Top 40)	19
Europe (Eurochart Hot 100)	77
Germany (Media Control GfK)	14
Switzerland (Schweizer Hitparade)	58

== Certifications ==
Region	Certification	Certified units/sales
Germany (BVMI)	Gold	150,000^{^}
^{^} Shipments figures based on certification alone.
