= Santo Domingo (song) =

Single by Wanda Jackson

from the album Made in Germany
- B-side: "Oh Blacky Joe"
- Released: 1965
- Recorded: March 1965
- Studio: Electrola Studio
- Genre: Pop
- Label: Capitol; Electrola
- Songwriters: Bert Olden; Joachim Relin
- Producer: Otto Demler

Wanda Jackson singles chronology
"My First Day Without You" (1965)	"Santo Domingo" (1965)	"Morgan, Ja Morgen" (1965)

"Santo Domingo" is a song originally performed by American recording artist Wanda Jackson. The song was composed by Bert Olden and Joachim Relin and was Jackson's second single released outside of North America. It was preceded by her performance of "Fujiama Mama" reaching #1 for six months in Japan in the late 50's. The track was recorded in the German language and released exclusively to German markets as a pop song. "Santo Domingo" became a commercial success in 1965 after reaching major chart positions in several European countries. It was later released on Jackson's 1967 compilation titled Made in Germany.

== Background and recording ==
Wanda Jackson had become known to North American audiences as both a country and Rockabilly artist, with singles like "Let's Have a Party" (1960) and "Right or Wrong" (1961). In 1965, Jackson was asked by her long-time label (Capitol Records) to travel to overseas to record exclusively for their European distributor named Electrola Records. Jackson agreed and traveled to Cologne, Germany in March 1965 to record several selections for Electrola in German. The label provided her with a German vocal coach to learn the material. Among the songs she recorded in Cologne was "Santo Domingo".

The tune was composed by German songwriters Bert Olden and Joachim Relin. "Santo Domingo" was produced by Otto Demler in March 1965 at the Electrola Studio. Jackson recalled in her autobiography having to spend six hours recording the song due to trouble pronouncing the lyrics in German. She also recalled that the track had over 30 musicians on the final product, including a string section and a Belgian opera singer to sing background vocals. "Once I got through my part, the final record just gave me chills," she recounted.

== Release and chart performance ==
"Santo Domingo" was released as a single in 1965 on both Capitol and Electrola Records. It was backed on the B-side by another German-language track titled "Oh Blacky Joe". The single was issued as a seven-inch vinyl record. "Santo Domingo" was Jackson's first single to reach a number one chart position in her career topping the Austrian pop list in July 1966 and spending 12 weeks there. It also climbed to number 14 on the Belgian pop chart in 1965 and number five on the German singles chart in 1965. It was not released on an album until 1967 when Capitol issued the compilation, Made in Germany. The disc included Jackson's previously released German singles.

== Charts ==
Chart (1965)	Peak position
Austria (Ö3 Austria Top 40)	1
Belgium (Ultratop 50 Flanders)	14
Germany (Official German Charts)	5
