= Willst du mit mir gehn (song) =

Single by Nena

from the album Willst du mit mir gehn
- Released: 13 June 2005
- Length: 3:46
- Label: Warner
- Songwriter(s): Nena Kerner; Uwe Fahrenkrog-Petersen
- Producer(s): Uwe Fahrenkrog-Petersen

Nena singles chronology
"Liebe ist" (2005)	"Willst du mit mir gehn" (2005)	"Lass mich" (2005)

"Willst du mit mir gehn" (German for "Do You Want to Go with Me") is a song by German recording artist Nena. It was co-written and produced along by Uwe Fahrenkrog-Petersen for her same-titled thirteenth studio album (2005). Released as the album's second single, the song reached the top 10 of the German Singles Chart.

== Formats and track listings ==
CD maxi single
No.	Title	Length
1.	"Willst du mit mir gehn"	3:46
2.	"Willst du mit mir gehn" (Sven Väth & Anthony Rother remix)	6:15
3.	"Willst du mit mir gehn" (French Electro Club mix)	4:55
4.	"Willst du mit mir gehn" (live version)	4:46

== Charts ==
=== Weekly charts ===
Chart (2005)	Peak position
Austria (Ö3 Austria Top 40)	11
Germany (GfK)	6
Switzerland (Schweizer Hitparade)	34

=== Year-end charts ===
Chart (2005)	Position
Germany (Media Control GfK)	58
