= Bongo Girl =

Studio album by Nena
- Released: 28 September 1992
- Studios: Spliff Studio, Berlin
- Length: 52:20
- Languages: German; English
- Label: Epic
- Producers: Nena; Jürgen Dehmel

Nena chronology
Nena die Band (1991)	Bongo Girl (1992)	Und alles dreht sich (1994)

Nena solo chronology
Wunder gescheh'n (1989)	Bongo Girl (1992)	Und alles dreht sich (1994)

Singles from Bongo Girl
- 1. "Manchmal ist ein Tag ein ganzes Leben" Released: 1992; 2. "Conversation" Released: 14 December 1992; 3. "Ohne Ende" Released: 1 June 1993

Bongo Girl is the second studio album by German pop singer Nena, released by Epic Records on 28 September 1992. Singles from this album are "Manchmal ist ein Tag ein ganzes Leben", "Conversation" and "Ohne Ende".

== Background ==
Bongo Girl was Nena's second solo album and, having been recorded in Berlin, was mixed at Eddy Grant’s Blue Wave studio in Barbados. It took its name from a nickname Nena acquired in Jamaica when taking to the stage at an open air reggae concert and spontaneously playing the bongos. Contributors to the album included the father of her two surviving children (Benedict Freitag) as well as two members of the former Nena band (including her former boyfriend, Rolf Brendel) and Frank Becking from her pre-Nena group, The Stripes.

Bongo Girl marked, according to Allmusic, a "striking contrast" from its predecessor Wunder gescheh'n in that it was, "distinctly relaxed and upbeat ... very pleasingly carried through on Nena's melodic strength and the sense of fun that pervades the album". Reinforcing the change was Nena's new look – short hair and more feminine attire – which may have been influenced by Madonna then in her Erotica period, the parallel well illustrated by the fact that in the same month (October 1992) that the American appeared topless in the French edition of Max (as part of the publicity surrounding the release of her book Sex), Nena appeared naked (albeit with bodypaint) in the German edition of the magazine which coincided with the release of Bongo Girl.

== Chart performance ==
Bongo Girl spent three months in the German charts, reaching a top position of No. 32. Three singles were released from the album but only the first ("Manchmal ist ein Tag ein ganzes Leben") charted, peaking at No. 48. The promotional videos for the first two singles were both filmed in the Caribbean (Eddy Grant appearing briefly in the "Conversation" video). This overall record of modest success resulted in Nena's recording contract with Sony not being renewed, although Sony and Nena were reunited 22 years later when the company obtained the distribution rights to her twelfth solo studio album, Oldschool.

== Bongo Girl tour ==
Live performances have been a prominent feature of Nena's career. The band toured extensively in the four years they were at the height of their fame and, during her subsequent solo career, Nena has given almost 500 concerts. However, in the first decade after the band's split in 1987, during which time Nena had five children, her only tour was the 1993 Bongo Girl tour. This tour differed in two main ways from all her others. Firstly Nena's new look (short hair, often barefoot and revealingly dressed including a skirt made of bananas) and secondly the setlist which followed her career to date chronologically, opening with "99 Luftballons" (which normally comes towards the end of her concerts) and other Nena band classics followed by the highlights of her previous solo album before concluding with an almost complete rendition of the Bongo Girl album.

As the 1990s, the commercial lowpoint in Nena's career, progressed, Bongo Girl's songs disappeared from her live concerts although "Manchmal ist ein Tag ein ganzes Leben" was the only song from her four studio albums of the 1990s to feature in the 2002 three-hour-long concert which marked the 20th anniversary of the breakthrough of the band and helped relaunch her solo career. Even then the song's appearance was brief and possibly spontaneous (an unaccompanied 70-second version following Nena asking the audience if there is anything else they would like her to sing).

== Track listing ==
No.	Title	Title translation	Length
1.	"Manchmal ist ein Tag ein ganzes Leben"	"Sometimes a Day Is a Whole Lifetime"	4:02
2.	"Was dann"	"What Then?"	3:10
3.	"Ich kann nich' mehr"	"I Can't Take Anymore"	3:46
4.	"Mach dir keine Sorgen"	"Don't Worry"	4:52
5.	"Ohne Ende"	"Without End"	3:23
6.	"Alles viel zu schön"	"All Much Too Beautiful"	2:58
7.	"Was immer du tust"	"Whatever You Do"	3:53
8.	"Conversation"		4:16
9.	"Bongo Girl"		3:47
10.	"You Don't Have to Cry"		4:09
11.	"Mein König"	"My King"	4:05
12.	"Keine Lügen mehr"	"No More Lies"	4:11
13.	"Weit über den Ozean"	"Far Across the Ocean"	4:01
14.	"Outro"		1:41

== Charts ==
Chart (1992)	Peak position
German Albums (Offizielle Top 100)	32
