= Wenn alles richtig ist, dann stimmt was nich =

Studio album by Nena
- Released: 6 July 1998
- Studios: Tonamt Studios, Hamburg
- Length: 40:51
- Language: German
- Label: Polydor
- Producers: Philipp Palm; Lukas Hilbert; Tony Bruno

Nena chronology
| Jamma nich (1997) | Wenn alles richtig ist, dann stimmt was nich (1998) | Nena Live (1998) |

Singles from Wenn alles richtig ist, dann stimmt was nich
- 1. "Was hast du in meinem Traum gemacht" Released: 2 March 1998

Wenn alles richtig ist, dann stimmt was nich ("When Everything's Right, Something's Wrong") is the fifth studio album by German pop singer Nena, released on 6 July 1998. It marks a return to a more rock-oriented sound. Debuting and peaking at No. 42 on the German charts, it is the third and most recent of Nena's studio albums to miss the top 40.

The only official single from this album is "Was hast du in meinem Traum gemacht". It failed commercially, spending a single week on the charts, at No. 91. Another two tracks – "Das ist normal" and "Dann fiel mir auf" – were released as promotional singles, and Nena performed still another track ("Wenn wenigstens Sommer wär") in the German TV drama series Die Affäre Semmeling.

== Track listing ==
| No. | Title | Title translation | Length |
|---|---|---|---|
| 1. | "Willkommen" | "Welcome" | 0:04 |
| 2. | "Es ist in Ordnung" | "It's Alright" | 3:12 |
| 3. | "Was hast du in meinem Traum gemacht" | "What Were You Doing in My Dream?" | 3:56 |
| 4. | "Wenn wenigstens Sommer wär" | "If Only It Were Summer" | 3:03 |
| 5. | "Dann fiel mir auf" | "Then I Realized" | 4:06 |
| 6. | "Meine kleine heile Welt" | "My Little Perfect World" | 3:24 |
| 7. | "Das ist normal" | "That's Normal" | 3:53 |
| 8. | "Es muss raus" | "I Have to Tell It" | 3:55 |
| 9. | "Todmüde" | "Dead Tired" | 4:13 |
| 10. | "Wir sind modern" | "We Are Modern" | 3:09 |
| 11. | "Heul dich bei mir aus" | "Cry on My Shoulder" | 4:47 |
| 12. | "Wir machen keine Kunst" (bonus track) | "This Isn't Art" | 3:20 |

== Charts ==
| Chart (1998) | Peak position |
|---|---|
| German Albums (Offizielle Top 100) | 42 |
