= Made in Germany (Nena album) =

Studio album by Nena
- Released: 2 October 2009
- Recorded: 2008–2009
- Genres: Pop, pop rock
- Length: 60:10
- Label: Laugh & Peas (BMG)
- Producers: Nena Kerner, Uwe Fahrenkrog-Petersen, Reinhold Heil, Derek von Krogh

Nena chronology
Cover Me (2007)	Made in Germany (2009)	Made in Germany Live (2010)

Singles from Made in Germany
- 1. "Wir sind wahr" Released: 18 September 2009; 2. "Du bist so gut für mich" Released: 19 February 2010; 3. "In meinem Leben" Released: 16 March 2010; 4. "Geheimnis" b/w "Mein Freund" Released: 3 September 2010

Made in Germany is the tenth studio album by German pop singer Nena, released by Laugh and Peas on 2 October 2009 in German-speaking Europe. It reached No. 3 on the German charts, and the first single, "Wir sind wahr", was well received. The album was certified gold on 24 April 2010. It combines alternative rock with electropop on songs like "SchönSchönSchön", "Dreh dich" and "Geheimnis", while songs like "Es gibt keine Sicherheit", "Wir sind wahr" and "Made in Germany" are in the more familiar Nena style of pop rock. In April 2010, Nena embarked on an international Made in Germany Tour to support the album.

== Background ==
Made in Germany coincided with several landmarks in Nena’s life and career. She became a grandmother, turned 50 and her two eldest surviving children began to appear as her backing singers on this album, the first to be released by her own record label, Laugh and Peas. Four tracks were released as singles from the album, the ones having the most impact being “Wir sind wahr” and “In meinem Leben”.

== "Wir sind wahr" ==
The first single from Made in Germany, “Wir sind wahr” (We are true) was co-written by Nena herself and is a straightforward celebration of a happy relationship, one of a long line of Nena songs invoking flying to symbolise wellbeing. It reached #17 in the German charts. Its accompanying promotional video attracted attention for showing a room of people including Nena wearing the clothes and practising the meditation techniques of Osho Bhagwan Shree Rashneesh. In a 2012 interview Nena said that she was not a follower of Osho but that he was one of a number of people who had inspired her.

== "In meinem Leben" ==
The third single from Made in Germany, the Nena-penned ballad “In meinem Leben” (In my life) was released two days after Nena’s 50th birthday and is, according to Allmusic, “a touching glimpse of autobiographical thoughts on Nena's life so far.” While the album version is a calm guitar ballad with strings, the radio version was remixed into a pop rock ballad with drums and an electric guitar, neither of which are present in the album version. The promotional video features Nena singing the song against a backdrop of footage and photos from her entire career and with both the fathers of her five children, together with some of those children, benignly looking on. Sometimes likened to a German My Way, however Nena admits to a variety of excesses and indiscretions ranging from smoking, drugs and drinking to betrayal and undermining her strength. The overall thrust of the lyrics, however, is positive - the good things outweighing or dissipating the bad. The song includes homelies such as, “I don’t want to be poor and money doesn’t make me rich,” and ends with the assertion, “I’m in love with life and am staying here a while longer with you.” One reviewer concludes, “everything about this is gorgeous…it's 27 years and a million miles away from 99 Red Balloons."

During its 20-week spell in the German singles charts, “In meinem Leben” became Nena’s 14th top 10 hit in Germany (the most any German female soloist has ever achieved) Liste der Top-10-Singles in Deutschland peaking at #4. The single also dramatically revived the fortunes of the album, which, after 11 weeks, had fallen out of the German album charts four months prior to the release of “In meinem Leben". With the single’s release, however, Made in Germany immediately re-entered at number 6 and remained in the German album charts for a further 24 weeks.

Another unexpected dimension to the song's success is that its extensive use of the perfect tense means that it is used for German lessons both in English schools and on language learning websites.

== Promotional tour ==
Since 1997, Nena has toured Germany more or less constantly with occasional concerts in neighbouring countries. The promotional tour for the release of Made in Germany remains the most extensive tour of her solo career, comprising 44 dates in 9 different countries, including her last (to date) concert in the UK, 26 years after her previous appearance there. The concert in Berlin on 24 April 2010 was recorded for the Made in Germany Live DVD and (with 6 “bonus” tracks from earlier concerts) the corresponding live album. The tour may have temporarily taken its toll on Nena, who cancelled some dates the following year saying that, although not ill, she was not at full strength.

== Track listing ==
1. SchönSchönSchön (GreatGreatGreat) – 3:50
2. Du bist so gut für mich (You're So Good For Me) – 4:28
3. Ich bin hyperaktiv (I'm Hyperactive) – 3:46
4. Dreh dich (Turn Yourself Around) – 3:15
5. Geheimnis (Secret) – 4:14
6. Du hast dich entschieden (You Have Decided) – 4:13
7. Wir sind wahr (We're True) – 5:41
8. Made in Germany – 3:44
9. In meinem Leben (In My Life) – 5:39
10. Es gibt keine Sicherheit (There's No Certainty) – 3:25
11. Schmerzen (Pains) – 5:33
12. Ganz viel Zeit (Really Much Time) – 6:41
13. Nachts wenn es warm ist (At Night When It's Warm) – 5:49

== Charts ==
=== Weekly charts ===
Chart (2009)	Peak position
Austrian Albums (Ö3 Austria)	4
German Albums (Offizielle Top 100)	3
Swiss Albums (Schweizer Hitparade)	25

=== Year-end charts ===
Chart (2010)	Position
German Albums (Offizielle Top 100)	81

== Certifications and sales ==
Region	Certification	Certified units/sales
Germany (BVMI)	Gold	100,000^{^}
^{^} Shipments figures based on certification alone.
