= Jamma nich =

Studio album by Nena
- Released: 14 April 1997
- Studios: Pilot Studios, München; Central Sound, Hamburg; Kerner Studios, Hamburg; Tonamt Studios, Hamburg
- Length: 43:06
- Language: German
- Label: Polydor
- Producer: Armand Volker

Nena chronology
Und alles dreht sich (1994)	Jamma nich (1997)	Wenn alles richtig ist, dann stimmt was nich (1998)

Singles from Jamma nich
- 1. "Ganz gelassen" Released: 10 March 1997; 2. "Alles was du willst" Released: 1 September 1997

Jamma nich is the fourth studio album by German pop singer Nena. The title is a colloquial rendering of the German injunction jammere nicht! ("don't complain" or "don't whine"). Nena wrote the album with Annette Humpe (Ideal, Ich und Ich), who also co-produced, and Luci van Org (Lucilectric). Their involvement may explain the "synth pop tendency" that makes it "a unique kind of semideparture in her catalog". By the time Jamma nich was released, Nena was pregnant with her fifth and final child but continued a full round of TV and promotional appearances in support of the various singles released from the album until late into her pregnancy. The first official single was "Ganz gelassen", which at one point was called "Riesenarschloch", a swear word included in the lyrics. The second single released was "Alles was du willst"; there were also promotional singles "Jamma nich" and "Auf dich und mich". The album enjoyed moderate success, peaking at No. 29 in Germany.

== Track listing ==
No.	Title	Title translation	Length
1.	"Ganz gelassen"	"Unperturbed"	4:21
2.	"Alles was du willst"	"Everything You Want"	3:28
3.	"Jamma nich"	"Don't Whine"	4:14
4.	"Es wird immer wieder gut"	"It'll Be Good Again"	3:37
5.	"Kaputt"	"Broken" (context: "I Won't Break It")	3:33
6.	"Na und?"	"So What?"	3:01
7.	"Es gibt so viele Möglichkeiten"	"There Are So Many Possibilities"	3:15
8.	"Heute bin ich gar nicht lieb"	"I'm Not Being Nice at All Today"	3:55
9.	"Auf dich und mich"	"To You and Me"	4:30
10.	"Amerika"	"America"	3:23
11.	"Lass los"	"Let Go"	5:23

== Charts ==
Chart (1997)	Peak position
German Albums (Offizielle Top 100)	29
