= ? (Nena album) =

? (Fragezeichen)

Studio album by Nena
- Released: 27 January 1984
- Recorded: October–December 1983
- Studio: Spliff Studio, West Berlin; A&R Studios, New York City
- Genre: Neue Deutsche Welle, pop rock, pop
- Length: 42:16
- Language: German
- Label: CBS
- Producer: Reinhold Heil, Manfred Praeker

Nena chronology
Nena (1983)	? (Fragezeichen) (1984)	99 Luftballons (1984)

Singles from ? (Fragezeichen)
- 1. "? (Fragezeichen)" Released: December 1983; 2. "Rette mich" Released: 1984; 3. "Lass mich dein Pirat sein" Released: 1984

Professional ratings
Review scores
Source	Rating
Allmusic	4/5 stars

? (Fragezeichen) (German for "Question mark") is the second album by German pop rock band Nena and the third studio album to feature its lead singer, Gabriele "Nena" Kerner. It was released on 27 January 1984, just a few months before the band's first international album 99 Luftballons, which contains songs from their debut album Nena (1983) and this album, some of them re-recorded with English lyrics.

Like its self-titled predecessor, this album was produced by Reinhold Heil and Manne Praeker of Spliff.

== Title track ==
The album's title track was co-written by Nena and the band's keyboard player Jörn-Uwe Fahrenkrog-Petersen and is so called since, having written the song, Nena was unable to settle on a title and so indicated its spot in the band's live set list with a question mark. It reached No. 3 in the German charts in 1983. The lyrics – written by Nena – comprise the thoughts of someone racked by indecisiveness ("Today I'm coming, today I'm also going... Perhaps I'll stay, yesterday that wasn't for me, today I need endless love") but still adamant that they know what's best for them ("No-one can tell me what is best... and who is best... because I know exactly"). The song is a mainstay of Nena's live concerts and seems to be particularly popular with female fans although it is not uncommon for Nena to interrupt her performance of the song, apparently to laugh at the absurdity of the lyrics. In the middle of the version recorded for the 2004 album Nena Live Nena she says, "I felt so small when I wrote this".

Like most of the band's greatest hits, "? (Fragezeichen)" was anglicised for the international album 99 Luftballons and then updated for the Nena feat. Nena album, which reignited Nena's solo career in 2002.

== Track listing ==
Side A contains tracks 1 to 6 and Side B contains tracks 7 to 12.

No.	Title	Lyrics	Music	Length
1.	"Rette mich" (Rescue Me)	Carlo Karges	Karges	3:17
2.	"? (Fragezeichen)" (Question Mark)	Nena Kerner	Jörn-Uwe Fahrenkrog-Petersen	4:28
3.	"Das Land der Elefanten" (The Land of the Elephants)	Karges, Fahrenkrog	Fahrenkrog	3:42
4.	"Unerkannt durchs Märchenland" (Unrecognized Through Fairyland)	Kerner	Jürgen Dehmel	3:21
5.	"Küss mich wach" (Kiss Me Awake)	Rolf Brendel	Brendel	2:43
6.	"Lass mich dein Pirat sein" (Let Me Be Your Pirate)	Brendel	Kerner, Brendel	4:51
7.	"Ich häng' an dir" (I'm Hangin' on You)	Kerner	Fahrenkrog	4:13
8.	"Sois bienvenu" (French: Welcome)	Brendel	Fahrenkrog	3:22
9.	"Keine Antwort" (No Answer)	Karges	Dehmel	3:18
10.	"Der Bus is' schon weg" (The Bus Has Already Left)	Karges	Karges	0:15
11.	"Es regnet" (It's Raining)	Karges	Karges	4:45
12.	"Der Anfang vom Ende" (The Beginning of the End)	Kerner	Kerner	3:53
Total length:				42:16

== Personnel ==
Credits adapted from Allmusic and Discogs.

=== Nena ===
- Nena Kerner – main vocals, arrangement
- Jörn-Uwe Fahrenkrog-Petersen – keyboard, backing vocals, lead vocals on track 3
- Carlo Karges – guitar, backing vocals
- Jürgen Dehmel – bass
- Rolf Brendel – drums, percussion

=== "? (Fragezeichen)" and "Lass mich dein Pirat sein" ===
- David Sanborn – saxophone
- Ollie Cotton – engineering
- Stanley Wallace – engineering

=== Technical personnel ===
- Imre Sereg – engineering (on all tracks, except "? (Fragezeichen)" and "Lass mich dein Pirat sein")
- Manfred "Manne" Praeker – production
- Reinhold Heil – engineer (on all tracks, except "? (Fragezeichen)" and "Lass mich dein Pirat sein"), production
- Jim Rakete – cover design
- Roman Stolz – cover design
- Rico Sonderegger – mastering

== Charts ==
Chart (1984)	Peak position
Austrian Albums Chart	1
Dutch Albums Chart	2
German Albums Chart	1
Norwegian Albums Chart	17
Swedish Albums Chart	11
Swiss Albums Chart	1

== Certifications and sales ==
Region	Certification	Certified units/sales
Germany (BVMI)	Platinum	500,000^{^}
Netherlands (NVPI)	Gold	50,000^{^}
^{^} Shipments figures based on certification alone.

== Release history ==
Region	Year	Label	Format	Catalog
West Germany	1984	CBS	LP	CBS 25 870
West Germany	1984	Bertelsmann	LP	CBSCL 40383-2 (Club edition)
Netherlands	1984	CBS	LP	CBS 25 870
Yugoslavia	1984	CBS, Suzy	LP	CBS 25 870
West Germany	1984	CBS	cassette	CBS 40–25870
West Germany	1984	CBS	CD	CDCBS 25870
Japan	1984	Epic/Sony	CD	35.8P-55
Yugoslavia	1984	CBS, Suzy	cassette	CBS 40–25870
Europe	1993	Columbia	CD	COL 47365 2 (reissue)
Germany	1998	Columbia	CD	COL 47365 9 (reissue)
