= Made in Germany (Wanda Jackson album) =

Compilation album by Wanda Jackson
- Released: 1967
- Recorded: 1965
- Genre: Pop
- Label: Capitol; Electrola
- Producer: Otto Demler

Wanda Jackson chronology
You'll Always Have My Love (1967)	Made in Germany (1967)	The Best of Wanda Jackson (1968)

Made in Germany is a compilation album by American recording artist Wanda Jackson. It was released in 1967 via Capitol Records and contained 16 previously released tracks. It was Jackson's first compilation released outside of the American market. The songs included for the album were recorded entirely in the German language. Some of these tracks had been released as singles internationally and became successful. This included the number one single, "Santo Domingo", which was first released in 1965.

== Background, content and release ==
Wanda Jackson had become known in North America as a Rockabilly and Country performer, with English language singles such as "Fujiyama Mama" (1958), "Let's Have a Party" (1960) and "Right or Wrong". After reaching a period of limited commercial success, Jackson's label (Capitol Records) asked if she could record a selection of songs for the German music market. Jackson agreed and flew to Cologne, Germany to work alongside Austrian record producer Otto Demler. Between March and October 1965, Demler recorded a series of German language songs, beginning with "Santo Domingo". In her autobiography, Jackson recounted recording all of the music without any of the musicians present since their sessions had previously been recorded.

In 1967, Made in Germany was released on Capitol Records in conjunction with their German imprint, Electrola Records. The album was issued as a vinyl LP, containing eight tracks on either side. It was Jackson's first compilation released entirely for international music markets. The album consisted of material previously released to German language markets. Several of these tracks had been single releases as well: "Santo Domingo", "Morgen, Ja Morgen", "Doch dann kam Johnny", "Komm Heim, Mein Wandersmann", "Wer an Das Meer Sein Herz Verliert", "Wenn Der Abschied Kommt", "Vom Winde Verweht" and "Addio My Love". "Santo Domingo" had reached the number one spot on the German music chart in 1965. In 2021, it was re-released to digital and streaming sites with an expanded track listing.

== Track listing ==
=== Vinyl version ===
Side one
No.	Title	Writer(s)	Length
1.	"Santo Domingo"	Olden; Relin
2.	"Das Kommt Vom Glück In Der Liebe"	Gordoni; Kendler
3.	"Komm Heim, Mein Wandersmann"	Bradtke; Gietz
4.	"Ohne Sterne Ist Der Himmel Leer"	Dieter
5.	"Abschiedsrosen"	Götz; Hein
6.	"Ich Schau' Hinunter In's Tal (My Gal Sal)"	Auerbach; Dresser
7.	"Oh Lonesome Me"	Gibson; Siegel
8.	"Addio My Love"	Meiser; Sonneborn

Side two
No.	Title	Writer(s)	Length
1.	"Wer An Das Meer Sein Herz Verliert"	Olden; Relin
2.	"Louisiana - Moon"	Kendler
3.	"Vom Winde Verweht"	Arnie; Hein
4.	"Oh, Blacky Joe"	Becht; Relin
5.	"Morgen, Ja Morgen"	Götz; Hellmer; Hertha
6.	"Doch Dann Kam Johnny"	Olden; Relin
7.	"Der Mond Ist Der Freund Der Verliebten"	Kunze; R. M. Siegel, Jr.
8.	"Wenn Der Abschied Kommt"	Goetz; Schumacher

=== Digital version ===
Made in Germany (Expanded Edition)
No.	Title	Writer(s)	Length
1.	"Santo Domingo"	Olden; Relin
2.	"Das Kommt Vom Glück In Der Liebe"	Gordoni; Kendler
3.	"Komm Heim, Mein Wandersmann"	Bradtke; Gietz
4.	"Ohne Sterne Ist Der Himmel Leer"	Dieter
5.	"Abschiedsrosen"	Götz; Hein
6.	"Ich Schau' Hinunter In's Tal (My Gal Sal)"	Auerbach; Dresser
7.	"Oh Lonesome Me"	Gibson; Siegel
8.	"Addio My Love"	Meiser; Sonneborn
9.	"Wer An Das Meer Sein Herz Verliert"	Olden; Relin
10.	"Louisiana - Moon"	Kendler
11.	"Vom Winde Verweht"	Arnie; Hein
12.	"Morgen, Ja Morgen"	Götz; Hellmer; Hertha
13.	"Doch Dann Kam Johnny"	Olden; Relin
14.	"Der Mond Ist Der Freund Der Verliebten"	Kunze; R. M. Siegel, Jr.
15.	"Wenn Der Abschied Kommt"	Goetz; Schumacher
16.	"Warum Gleich Tranen"	NA
17.	"Schnick in nicht fort, Daddy"	NA
18.	"Was Hat Man Denn Bloss Vonn Einem Mann"	NA
19.	"Ein Herz Verliert, Ein Herz Gewinnt"	NA

== Release history ==
Region	Date	Format	Label	Ref.
Austria and Germany	1967	Vinyl	Capitol Records; Electrola Records	
United States	August 13, 2021	Music download; streaming	Capitol Records Nashville	
