= Du bist gut =

Studio album by Nena
- Released: 2 November 2012
- Studios: Sundlaugin at Mosfellsbær, Iceland
- Genre: Pop
- Length: 106:25
- Language: German
- Labels: The Laugh and Peas Company
- Producer: Derek von Krogh

Nena chronology
Made in Germany Live (2010)	Du bist gut (2012)	Oldschool (2015)

Singles from Du bist gut
- 1. "Das ist nicht alles" Released: 26 October 2012; 2. "Besser gehts nicht" Released: 22 March 2013

Du bist gut ("You're Good") is the eleventh studio album by German pop singer Nena. The album was recorded in Iceland and released on 2 November 2012 by The Laugh and Peas Company, the record label run by Nena and her partner Philipp Palm. The cover artwork is designed by Nena's daughter Larissa, and her son Sakias duets with her on a couple of tracks. The album peaked at No. 2 in the German album charts.

== Content ==
Du bist gut comprises one CD of 15 songs (14 original, 1 reworking of a 2001 album track), and the "de luxe bonus edition" has a second CD comprising studio reworkings and live performances of earlier recordings.

The album covers many of the themes running through Nena's previous work, "Freiheit" (Freedom) and "Frieden" (Peace) being obvious examples. However it differs from many of its predecessors in that there are fewer fast songs and in "Ich habe dich verloren" (I have lost you) Nena writes an unremittingly bleak lyric, which is unusual for one so accustomed to put a positive spin on all sorts of setbacks and misfortune. As ever, Nena experiments with stylistic variations including the 7-minute synth-pop title track and the acoustic guitar backed "Lautlos" (Silently) which intimately showcases her voice and carefully crafted enunciation like few others have in her 30-year career.

Throughout her career, Nena's lyrics have evoked imagery of flying as a sign of well being and so it is with "Deine Flügel brechen nicht". Its lyrics are written from the perspective of someone struggling for inspiration. It culminates in the despairing, "Hilf mir Gott, wo ist mein Licht" (God help me, where is my inspiration?) before Nena's son takes over the vocals repeating the reassuring song title, "your wings aren't broken".

== Reception ==
Du bist gut received a mixed reception.

Reviewing the album for Radio Berg, Claudia Nitsche described it as, "Rarely fresh, rather slow and sometimes sad.... Nevertheless, accepting that Du bist gut is an eclectic affair, the songs are unmistakably Nena, a fact which will very much suit the fans. And as mentioned, sometimes it really sounds good, the electronic title track being amongst the bravest compositions.".

Ulf Kubanke of laut.de however, could see little positive in the album, describing Nena as, "past her artistic zenith", and the album as "a collection of half-baked suggestions and ideas mutilated from the outset. All integrated nicely in Nena's shopping channel presentation of sweet awakening spirituality."

Du bist gut was released whilst Nena was enjoying regular exposure on German national television as a juror on The Voice of Germany. However, a month after the album's release, she made two TV consecutive appearances which tarnished her reputation. Firstly she attracted criticism for her appearance on the chat show Wetten, dass..? by refusing to answer questions about the past and being implausibly positive about the present. Less than a week later she was thought to be unduly brusque as a juror on The Voice of Germany in dismissing an act that were not to her taste.

== Singles ==
Two tracks were released as singles from the album. Firstly at the time of the album's release "Das ist nicht alles", which had been amongst the tracks from Du bist gut which Nena had been performing live in her 2012 concerts preceding the album's release. The promotional video features various Nena family members as well as the singer herself, at the age of 52, making one of her rare (and therefore more striking) appearances in a short yellow mini dress. The single scraped into the German top 40.

The second and final single to be released was "Besser geht's nicht", the video to which features an appearance by the Austrian actor Helmut Berger. The single failed to chart, her first such failure since 2007 and only the second since her 2002 comeback.

== Aftermath ==
In 2014 Nena seemed to move on from Du bist gut and the not entirely helpful national exposure surrounding its release. In March 2014 she announced her withdrawal from The Voice of Germany, saying that she was going to concentrate on her own projects, including a new book. She grew her hair longer (giving her a less severe look) and released her first album of children's songs for 6 years. Nena also absented herself from national TV appearances for most of the year, her longest period away from the screens since the death of her son in 1989, eventually emerging in December 2014 to appear on a programme in aid of a poverty relief charity. Despite her withdrawal from the national limelight, Nena was as active as ever in connecting with her fanbase, including via her social media output and by maintaining her schedule of live concerts which has been more or less constant since 1997. Only one track from Du bist gut (namely "Das ist nicht alles") survived onto the set list of her 2014 concerts, by which time she was already trailing a handful of songs from her next album, Oldschool, which was released on 27 February 2015.

== Track listing ==
CD 1

1. Das ist nicht alles (That Isn't Everything) 4:26
2. Schmetterling (Butterfly) 3:55
3. Lied Nummer eins (Song Number One) 3:21
4. Im Reich meiner Mitte (In the World of My Middle) 4:07
5. Freiheit (Freedom) 4:58
6. Besser gehts nicht (It Can't Get Better) 4:45
7. Ich hör mir zu (I Listen to Myself) 4:59
8. Wo ist mein Zuhause (Where Is My Home) 3:58
9. Goldene Zeit Goldenes Land (Golden Time Golden Land) 5:21
10. Solange Du Dir Sorgen machst (As Long as You're Worried) 3:15
11. Lautlos (Silently) 3:41
12. Ich hab Dich verloren (I Have Lost You) 5:21
13. Deine Flügel brechen nicht (Your Wings Don't Break) 5:10
14. Frieden (Peace) 5:30
15. Du bist gut (You're Good) 7:34

CD 2

1. Weisses Schiff (live in Berlin) (White Ship) 4:10
2. Lichtarbeiter (Studio Stuttgart) (Lightworkers) 5:14
3. Liebe ist (Studio Hamburg) (Love Is) 3:42
4. Schritt für Schritt (live in Berlin) (Step by Step) 5:21
5. Wunder gescheh'n (live in Berlin) (Miracles Happen) 5:33
6. Willst du mit mir gehn (Studio Iceland) (Do You Want to Go with Me) 4:12
7. Neues Land (live in Berlin) (New Land) 4:18
8. Ich bin die Liebe (Studio Iceland) (I'm Love) 3:24

== Charts ==
=== Weekly charts ===
Chart (2012)	Peak position
Austrian Albums (Ö3 Austria)	5
German Albums (Offizielle Top 100)	2
Swiss Albums (Schweizer Hitparade)	16

=== Year-end charts ===
Chart (2012)	Position
German Albums (Offizielle Top 100)	68
