= European Land-Robot Trial =

Robotics demonstration event

Logo of European Robotics

The European Land-Robot Trial (ELROB) is a European event which demonstrates the abilities of modern robots.

The ELROB is not a competition, like the US DARPA Grand Challenge, but a pure demonstration of what European robotics is able to achieve today. The scenarios are designed to simulate real world missions, be it military or civilian ones. There are no artificial constraints set to this scenarios to ease the task for the robots like e.g. very visible road markings. This forces the participating teams and systems to fulfil high requirements set by the real world scenarios.

The first ELROB in 2006 was organized by the German Federal Armed Forces and took place on the infantry training area near Hammelburg, 15–18 May 2006. The goal of the first trial was to boost the development of unmanned ground vehicles that could be used in military missions on short notice. The ELROB is an annual event and alternates between a military and a civilian focus each year.

European Robotics and the NATO Research Task Group "Military Applications for Multi-Robot Systems" came up with the idea for ELROB in the year 2004. European Robotics aims to bridge the gap between defence and security (D&S) users, industry and research in the field of ground robotics. The ELROB is a good opportunity to follow these goals.

Because ELROB is meant to be a European trial, only teams from Europe are allowed. But both teams of commercial and academic backgrounds are allowed.

== Civilian ELROB ==
The civilian ELROB (short C-ELROB) takes place every two years alternating with the military version. It was initiated to allow teams, which are not interested in military missions or cooperation, to attend ELROB, too. Sadly, until today, there is no team that takes part only on the C-ELROB. On the other hand, of course, the defence companies are not that interested in the civilian ELROB. Therefore, the number of teams on C-ELROB is a bit lower than on M-ELROB and organisation is a bit less strict. Most teams do not see C-ELROB as competition or as demonstration, but as possibility to prove their own systems in a challenging field test and new surroundings. It is a great opportunity to learn new things about their robot systems and find new approaches.

ELROB is explicitly designed to shape the direction of R&D for the short and medium term and aims to fertilize the co-operation between research and SMEs.

From 2013 till 2015, instead of C-ELROB the newly created EURATHLON trial will take place, a robot competition supported by the European Commission in the Seventh Framework Programme (FP7).

=== Scenarios ===
In general the scenarios should be mastered with maximum autonomy, although teleoperation is allowed. The location for the scenario is kept secret until short before the start of the trials and therefore the teams have no chance to generate a detailed map of the area (for example with laser range finders) ahead of their run. The location is described to the participants by GPS coordinates and aerial imagery.

==== Reconnaissance and Surveillance ====
The task in the "Reconnaissance and Surveillance" setting is to reach a given area and explore it. During the exploration special points of interest (normally marked) need to be detected and localized. The position of this points and a photograph should be given to the judges as results of the run. If possible, the robot should return to its starting position, when it finished exploring.

==== Autonomous Navigation ====
The aim of the "Autonomous Navigation" scenario is to follow a given route mostly autonomous. The route will be some kilometers in length. During the traversal of the route points of interest (usually marked) need to be found and localised. Again the position and a photograph of the points of interest need to be given to the judges as results of the run.

==== Camp Security ====
The "Camp Security" scenario requires the robots to guard a predefined area for the time of the scenario run. During the run (marked) intruders will be entering the area and need to be detected, tracked and pursued. An image of the intruder and its location while it was captured need to be given to the judges as result. Capturing means "drive near the intruder and stop", then the captured intruder will leave the area.

==== Transport Mule ====
The "Transport Mule" scenario simulates a shuttle service. The robot should install a shuttle service between two given points as autonomously as possible and shuttle between those points as often as possible during the time of its scenario run.

=== Past civilian ELROBs ===
==== 2007 ====
ELROB 2007 logo

C-ELROB 2007 took place in Monte Ceneri, Swiss (Canton Ticino), 13–16 August. The area of the trials was part of the truck test track of the Swiss army which meant very difficult ground for the vehicles.

With this ELROB the scenario "Autonomous Navigation" was integrated into ELROB for the first time. It was created on public demand to allow bigger vehicles to better show their abilities. Therefore, the track length of "Autonomous Navigation" was several kilometres. Additionally, there were three versions of the "Reconnaissance and Surveillance" setting. The first was in urban area which included intrusion of buildings. The second was placed in non urban area with higher requirements on the off-road mobility of the vehicles and the third one concentrated on the combination of UGVs and UAVs. All scenario run times were limited to 45 minutes.

The result of C-ELROB 2007 was, that there are some semi-autonomous assistance functions ready. Most vehicles managed to drive in difficult outdoor terrain, too. But some of the teams were surprised by reality and had severe problems with radio communication and battery power.

There were 14 participating teams in total. Nine of the teams came from Germany, two from Poland and one from Finland, Swiss and Portugal, respectively.

==== 2009 ====
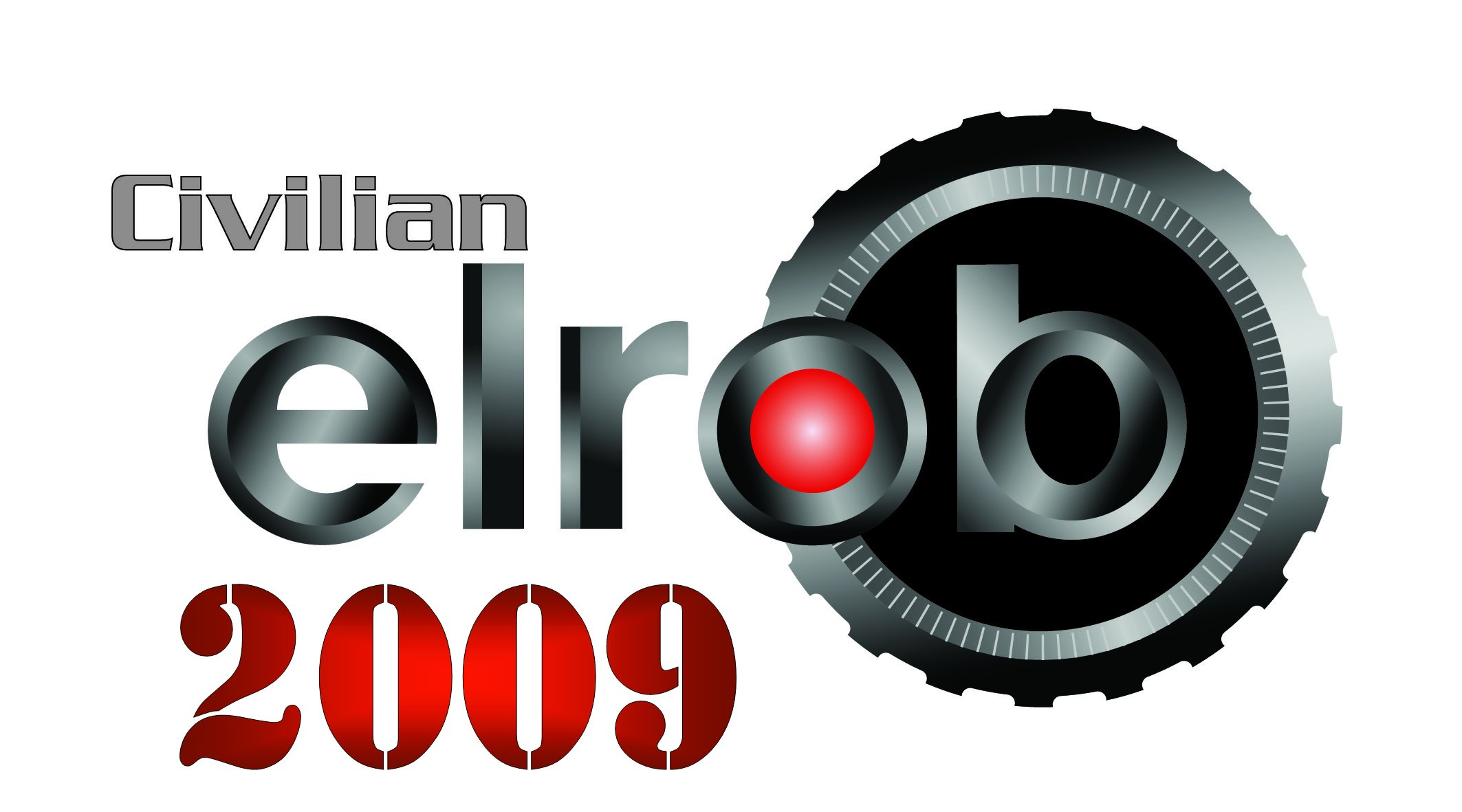
ELROB 2009 logo

The C-ELROB 2009 took place in Oulu, Finland, 15–17 June. The area of the trials was a former zoo and a part of a public forest near the University of Oulu.

The scenarios were very similar to the ones on the military ELROB 2008. This was due to public demand of the participants who requested more continuity in the scenarios to have the chance to catch up with the requirements of a scenario and not be confronted with different scenarios and requirements each year. Therefore, there were the "Reconnaissance and Surveillance", "Autonomous Navigation", "Camp Security" and "Transport Mule" scenarios. Additionally, all points of interest and the intruders in the "Camp Security" scenario were marked with ERICards, because computer vision was no focus of the trials. The run time of the scenarios was limited to 60 minutes.

ELROB 2009 was attended by ten teams. Seven teams came from Germany and one from France, Poland and Finland, each.

== Military ELROB ==
The military ELROB (short M-ELROB) has a sharp focus on short-term realisable systems which are able to fulfil the requirements of common military tasks. Therefore, the scenarios simulate real world missions as close as possible which is reflected by the fact that members of the Bundeswehr are part of the organisation committee. The organisers do not place artificial constraints on the scenarios regardless of the abilities of the robots. One example was the very bad radio communication encountered during M-ELROB 2008, because most trials took place in the forest. M-ELROB is explicitly designed to assess current technology to solve real world problems at hand.

M-ELROB is a tool to bring together users, researchers and industry.

=== Scenarios ===
The scenarios of the M-ELROBs correspond to real military situations like Reconnaissance and Surveillance missions. In general the scenarios should be mastered with maximum autonomy, although teleoperation is allowed. The location for the scenario is kept secret until short before the start of the trials and therefore the teams have no chance to generate a detailed map of the area (for example with laser range finders) ahead of their run. The location is described to the participants by GPS coordinates and aerial imagery.

==== Reconnaissance and Surveillance ====
The task in the "Reconnaissance and Surveillance" setting is to reach a given area and explore it. During the exploration special points of interest (normally marked) need to be detected and localized. The position of this points and a photograph should be given to the judges as results of the run. If possible, the robot should return to its starting position, when it finished exploring.

==== Autonomous Navigation ====
The aim of the "Autonomous Navigation" scenario is to follow a given route mostly autonomous. The route will be some kilometers in length. During the traversal of the route points of interest (usually marked) need to be found and localised. Again the position and a photograph of the points of interest need to be given to the judges as results of the run.

==== Camp Security ====
The "Camp Security" scenario requires the robots to guard a predefined area for the time of the scenario run. During the run (marked) intruders will be entering the area and need to be detected, tracked and pursued. An image of the intruder and its location while it was captured need to be given to the judges as result. Capturing means "drive near the intruder and stop", then the captured intruder will leave the area.

==== Transport Convoy ====
The "Transport Convoy" mission requests at least two vehicles to be navigated, as fast as possible, to a target position which is several kilometres away. A payload of about 50 kg needs to be transported. At most one of the vehicles may be controlled by human, which may reduce the task for the robot to autonomously follow a vehicle. Of course two (or more) completely autonomously vehicles are better.

==== Transport Mule ====
The "Transport Mule" scenario simulates a shuttle service. The robot should install a shuttle service between two given points as autonomously as possible and shuttle between those points as often as possible during the time of its scenario run.

=== Past military ELROBs ===
==== 2006 ====
ELROB 2006 logo

The M-ELROB 2006 took place in Hammelburg on the training area of the infantry school of the German Forces, 15–18 May.

M-ELROB 2006 was the first ELROB and was utilized to paint a picture of the possibilities of modern robotics. The scenarios were concentrated on navigation. One was located in urban terrain which includes intrusion into buildings. The other scenario took place outdoors on a more challenging ground with mud and very steep slopes. Both scenarios fall into the category "Reconnaissance and Surveillance", although there were no points of interest that needed to be found. The time limit was 30 minutes.

The result of M-ELROB 2006 was disillusioning. Most of the teams had to fight hardware failures and all were remote controlled via WLAN. All in all 18 teams were participating, eleven German teams, three from the UK, two from Swiss and one from Portugal and France, each.

==== 2008 ====
Again, the M-ELROB 2008 took place in Hammelburg on the training area of the infantry school of the German Forces from 30 June till 3 July. But it took place on a different part of the training area which was more challenging and hindered radio communication because of the dense forest.

The scenarios were much more manifold than in 2006 and 2007. There were "Reconnaissance and Surveillance", "Autonomous Navigation", "Transport Convoy", "Transport Mule" and "Camp Security". This scenarios required very diverse abilities from the robot systems. Additionally one special session of the "Reconnaissance and Surveillance" scenario took place at night time, so vision systems were unusable. The run time limit was 60 minutes for a scenario run.

The results of ELROB 2008 showed that remote controlled UGVs are more or less ready for deployment, but the radio communication places severe constraints on the usability of such systems. With semi autonomous assistance functions, like e.g. waypoint navigation, the robot system is much more useful while encountering bad radio communication.

M-ELROB 2008 was attended by 17 teams. Eleven from Germany, two from the UK and one from Italy, the Netherlands, France and Finland, respectively.

==== 2010 ====
The military ELROB 2010 took place from June 17 to 20 2010 on the army training area near Hammelburg in Germany.

=== Next military ELROB ===
==== 2012 ====
The military ELROB 2012 took place from September 24 to 28 2012 on the training area of the Swiss Army near Thun in Switzerland.

== See also ==
- Multi Autonomous Ground-robotic International Challenge
- DARPA Grand Challenge
- NATO
