= Carlo Karges =

German guitarist and songwriter (1951–2002)

Karges in an undated photograph

Carlo Karges (31 July 1951 – 30 January 2002) was a German musician known for his work as a guitarist and songwriter for the rock band Nena.

== Personal life ==
Karges was born in Hamburg in 1951 and grew up there with his single mother. He began developing his musical abilities as a student, when he started to play guitar and to compose his own songs, and thereafter played as part of a number of groups, including Tomorrow's Gift and Release Music Orchestra. In 1971 he became a founding member of the group Novalis, in which he played as a guitarist and keyboardist.

Karges died at the Eppendorf Clinic in Hamburg on 30 January 2002 at the age of 50, due to liver failure. He was buried in Hamburg's Ohlsdorf Cemetery.

== Nena ==
In 1981 Karges joined Gabriele "Nena" Kerner, Rolf Brendel, Jürgen Dehmel, and Uwe Fahrenkrog-Petersen in establishing the eponymous band Nena.

He wrote the lyrics of the band's most famous song, "99 Luftballons", released in 1983. He was attending a 1982 Rolling Stones concert at the Waldbühne (the "Forest Theatre") in West Berlin, when they released a large mass of helium balloons into the air. He wondered how East German or Soviet forces might react if the balloons crossed the Berlin Wall, and thus he conceived the idea for the song about a major war resulting from misidentification of a mass of balloons.
