= Willst du mit mir gehn =

Studio album by Nena
- Released: 21 March 2005
- Length: 42:06
- Language: German
- Label: Warner
- Producer: Uwe Fahrenkrog-Petersen

Nena chronology
Nena feat. Nena (2002)	Willst du mit mir gehn (2005)	Cover Me (2007)

Singles from Willst du mit mir gehn
- 1. "Liebe ist" Released: 28 February 2005; 2. "Willst du mit mir gehn" Released: 13 June 2005; 3. "Lass mich" Released: 7 October 2005

Willst du mit mir gehn (German: Do You Want to Go with Me) is the eighth studio album by German singer Nena. It was released by Warner Music on 21 March 2005 in German-speaking Europe. The singer reunited with former band mate Uwe Fahrenkrog-Petersen to work on the album. A two-CD set, the Rot disc of the album was recorded in a Berlin studio, while the Orange disc was produced during a jam sessions on Majorca.

The album earned mixed to positive reviews. It debuted at number one on the albums chart in Austria and Switzerland and reached number two of the German Albums Chart, largely reprising the success of previous album Nena feat. Nena (2002). It was eventually certfified 3× Gold by the Bundesverband Musikindustrie (BVMI) and also reached Gold status in Austria and Switzerland. Willst du mit mir gehn spawned three singles, including Nena's second number one hit "Liebe ist" and its title track.

== Background ==
Artistically Willst du mit mir gehn is arguably the most significant studio album in Nena's career since it ended the dominance of her discography by the 1980s songs which had both made her famous in the first place and then rekindled her career at the start of the new millennium. Although since 2002 Nena had had modest chart success as a featuring artist with Tok Tok, Sam Ragga Band and WestBam, she had not been a contemporary force with new material in her own name. In 2005 Willst du mit mir gehn, and in particular its first two tracks to be released as singles, changed that for the remainder of the decade and beyond.

In 2003, Nena went on vacation to Majorca with her band. There they got together for jam sessions in the evenings, in which Nena sang lyrics she made up in those particular moments. With the only changes made to them being shortenings, select songs are collected on the second CD. The first CD contains the eventual studio album, where three of the recordings from the Majorca sessions were reworked into complete songs.

"Immer weiter" and "Der Anfang" were already performed in Cologne in December 2003. This concert was recorded and released on the live album Nena Live Nena in 2004, before the release of Willst du mit mir gehn. Concerts from Nena's 2005 Willst du mit mir gehn tour were recorded with a view to being released on DVD but a subsequent dispute between Nena and her management company means that they remain unpublished.

== Promotion ==
"Liebe ist," written by Nena, is a straightforward celebration of a loving relationship which musically alternates between slow, intimate verses and its uptempo, anthemic chorus. In contrast to her other number one single, "99 Luftballons", which stalled at number two in Germany for a massive seven weeks before reaching the top position, "Liebe ist" entered at number one on 14 March 2005. This, being 22 years after "99 Luftballons", set a new record, which still stands, for the longest span between first and last number one in German chart history.

Title track "'Willst du mit mir gehn" was jointly written by Nena and Jörn-Uwe Fahrenkrog-Petersen, the keyboard player from the former band, the same combination that had written a number of the band's most successful 1980s tracks. Like "Liebe ist" the song has a positive message (about moving forwards and not looking back). A high-energy, disco track, the song peaked at number six on the German Singles Chart. A third single, "Lass mich," was released in October 2005 but only peaked at number 44 in Germany.

== Critical reception ==
Professional ratings
Review scores
Source	Rating
CDStarts	7.5/10
Laut.de	2/5 stars

Laut.de editor Benjamin Fuchs rated the album two stars out of five. He found that "it was certainly a brave step for Nena to put such long and experimental songs on the album, but she certainly won't scare away her old fans by doing so [...] Willst du mit mir gehn is overall an attempted but mixed comeback with a number of pleasant songs and too few highlights." Similarly, Tanja Kraus from CDStarts noted: "The courage to put the very experimental music and the chart-worthy music side by side deserves respect." While she was less enthusiastic about the Orange disc, she furtner wrote: "The extensive promotion and Nena's name in the music world are guaranteed to make this work a success."

== Track listing ==
All tracks produced by Jörn-Uwe Fahrenkrog-Petersen.

Disc 1: Rot — Standard edition
No.	Title	Writer(s)	Length
1.	"Willst Du mit mir gehn"	Nena Kerner; Jörn-Uwe Fahrenkrog-Petersen	3:45
2.	"Lass mich"	Kerner; Fahrenkrog-Petersen; Derek von Krogh; P. Di Leo; N. Rahy; A. Augustin; Patrick Christensen; Van Romaine	3:29
3.	"Und jetzt steh ich hier und warte"	Kerner; Fahrenkrog-Petersen; Krogh; Di Leo; Rahy; Augustin; Christensen; Romaine	4:47
4.	"Liebe ist"	Kerner; Fahrenkrog-Petersen	4:55
5.	"Ich komm mit dir"	Kerner; Fahrenkrog-Petersen	4:08
6.	"Immer weiter"	Kerner; Fahrenkrog-Petersen; Krogh; Di Leo; Rahy; Augustin; Christensen; Romaine	4:13
7.	"Ohne Liebe bin ich nichts" (Berlin Version)	Kerner; Fahrenkrog-Petersen	3:43
8.	"Vitamine"	Kerner; Fahrenkrog-Petersen	4:07
9.	"Wir fliegen"	Kerner; Fahrenkrog-Petersen	3:47
10.	"Neues Land"	Kerner; Fahrenkrog-Petersen	4:55
11.	"Der Anfang"	Kerner; Fahrenkrog-Petersen; Krogh; Di Leo; Rahy; Augustin; Christensen; Romaine	8:27

Disc 1: Rot — Deluxe edition (bonus track)
No.	Title	Writer(s)	Length
12.	"Ich will was Neues" (Berlin Version)	Kerner; Fahrenkrog-Petersen	3:14

Disc 2: Orange — Standard edition
No.	Title	Writer(s)	Length
1.	"Ja kann man denn da überhaupt was machen"/"Ich will was Neues"	Kerner; Fahrenkrog-Petersen; Krogh; Di Leo; Rahy; Christensen; Romaine	9:04
2.	"Es ist noch nicht zu spät"/"Das ist der Anfang"	Kerner; Fahrenkrog-Petersen; Krogh; Di Leo; Rahy; Christensen; Romaine	7:37
3.	"Ohne Liebe bin ich nichts"	Kerner; Fahrenkrog-Petersen; Di Leo; Rahy; Augustin; Christensen; Romaine	3:14
4.	"Machs doch"	Kerner; Fahrenkrog-Petersen; Krogh; Di Leo; Rahy; Augustin; Christensen; Romaine	11:06
5.	"Hey Pauli ein neuer Ton"	Kerner; Fahrenkrog-Petersen; Di Leo; Rahy; Christensen; Romaine	3:40
6.	"Wenn die Sonne scheint"	Kerner; Fahrenkrog-Petersen; Krogh; Di Leo; Rahy; Augustin; Christensen; Romaine	4:39
7.	"Das verträgt sich nicht mit uns"	Kerner; Fahrenkrog-Petersen; Krogh; Di Leo; Rahy; Christensen; Romaine	3:47
8.	"Hochzeit je t'aime"	Kerner; Fahrenkrog-Petersen; Di Leo; Rahy; Augustin; Christensen; Romaine	6:38
9.	"Die Tür geht zu"	Kerner; Fahrenkrog-Petersen; Di Leo; Rahy; Augustin; Christensen; Romaine	3:46

== Charts ==
=== Weekly charts ===
Weekly chart performance for Willst du mit mir gehn
Chart (2005)	Peak position
Austrian Albums (Ö3 Austria)	1
German Albums (Offizielle Top 100)	2
Dutch Albums (Album Top 100)	36
Swiss Albums (Schweizer Hitparade)	1

=== Year-end charts ===
Year-end chart performance for Willst du mit mir gehn
Chart (2005)	Position
Austrian Albums (Ö3 Austria)	9
German Albums (Offizielle Top 100)	9
Swiss Albums (Schweizer Hitparade)	32

== Certifications and sales ==
Certifications for Willst du mit mir gehn
Region	Certification	Certified units/sales
Austria (IFPI Austria)	Gold	15,000^{*}
Germany (BVMI)	3× Gold	300,000^{^}
Switzerland (IFPI Switzerland)	Gold	20,000^{^}
^{*} Sales figures based on certification alone.^{^} Shipments figures based on certification alone.
