= Jürgen Dehmel =

German musician

Jürgen Dehmel (born 12 August 1958) is a German bass player and songwriter.

He was born in Berlin. Dehmel was brought by keyboardist Uwe Fahrenkrog-Petersen to join the rock band Nena in 1981. Fahrenkrog-Petersen and Dehmel had previously been together in a band called Odessa, releasing a self-titled album in 1980. The band also included Helmut Hirt on vocals, Otto Schneider on drums, Bernd Däumchen on guitar and saxophone, and Andreas Römer on solo-guitar.

Dehmel joined Nena in 1981, and he remained until the band split in 1986. He continued to collaborate with Nena in her solo career and on tour, co-writing several songs for her solo albums. In 1986 Nena and Dehmel produced an album for the band Time Boys, under the names of Jay-Dee and Susi K. He also wrote songs and produced soundtracks for German films, and toured frequently with the singer Nina Hagen. In 1988–89 he also wrote three songs with his girlfriend, Ilonka Breitmeier, for a Bosnian-American pop star called Tinka. In 1991, he co-produced the album The Band (a collection of Nena's best songs). He usually works from his home-built recording studio.

Dehmel was married to Nena's sister, Kristiane, from 1985 to 1987. Kristiane was a nurse at a hospital in Berlin.
