= Rock 'n Roll Volume 2. =

Studio album by Gene Summers
- Released: 1973
- Recorded: Los Angeles, Dallas
- Genres: Rock 'n roll, rockabilly
- Label: Collector Records (Netherlands)
- Producers: Jan Records, Huey P. Meaux, A Cees Klop Production

Gene Summers chronology
Reminisce Cafe (2008)	Rock 'n Roll Volume 2. (1973)	The Southern Cat Rocks On (1975)

Rock And Roll Volume 2. is a 12" vinyl album by Gene Summers and five other artists. This was the first album ever released on Summers. It was issued in 1973 on the Collector Records imprint, a re-issue label located in the Netherlands. It is not available on CD.

== Production and album credits ==
Session musicians included: James McClung, Benny Williams, Gary Moon, Rene Hall, Plas Johnson, Earl Palmer, Red Callendar, David (Dave) Martin, Glen Keener, Charlie Mendias, Mel Robinson, Bobby Rambo, Joe Ramirez Combo, Jack Castleberry, C. B. Williams, Ernest Walker, Joe Cook, Al Struble, Larry Jannasch, Kenny Hargis, Dan Edwards, Glen Struble, Eddie Wayne Hill, Joel Colbert, Leonard Walters, Joe Donnell, Tommy Morrell, Art McNulty, Ronnie Dawson, Marvin ("Smokey") Montgomery, Bill Hudson, Dale Sellers, Jerry Stembridge, David Briggs, Stu Basore, Charlie McCoy, Mike Leech and Hayward Bishop. The background vocal groups were The Five Masks and The Jordanaires plus (Al Struble, Dan Edwards & Glen Struble). All the Summers tracks were recorded in Dallas and Los Angeles.

== Track listing ==
1. "School of Rock 'n Roll" - Gene Summers and His Rebels
2. "Nervous" - Gene Summers and His Rebels
3. "Gotta Lotta That" - Gene Summers and His Rebels
4. "Twixteen" - Gene Summers and His Rebels
5. "Alabama Shake" - Gene Summers and the Tom Toms
6. "Strait Straight Skirt" - Gene Summers and His Rebels
7. "Stop at the Hop" - Don Eee
8. "Jack and Jill" - Warren Storm
9. "Movin' Out" - The Squires
10. "Rock On the Moon" - Jimmy Steward
11. "School House Rock" - Billy Harlan
12. "I Wanna Bop" - Billy Harlan

== Discography references ==
Gene Summers discography from Rockin' Country Style, United States
Gene Summers discography from Rocky Productions, France
Gene Summers discography from Wangdangdula Finland
Gene Summers session data from Tapio's Fin-A-Billy, Finland

== Sources ==
- Liner notes "The Ultimate School Of Rock & Roll" 1997 United States
- Article and sessionography in issue 15 (1977) of New Kommotion Magazine UK
- Article and sessionography in issue 23 (1980) of New Kommotion Magazine UK
- Feature article and sessionography in issue 74 (1999) of Rockin' Fifties Magazine Germany
- Feature article with photo spread in issue 53 (2000) of Bill Griggs' Rockin' 50s Magazine United States
- Feature Article with photo spread in issue 54 (2000) of Bill Griggs' Rockin' 50s Magazine United States
