= Tommy & the Tom Toms =

American band

Tommy & The Tom Toms
- Origin: Dallas, Texas, United States
- Genres: Rock and roll, rhythm & blues, rockabilly
- Years active: 1959–1962
- Labels: Chess Records, LeBill Records, Sparton Records, Apex Records
- Past members: Tommy Brown (vocalist/piano); Eddie Wayne Hill (lead guitar); Joel Colbert (drums); David A. Martin (bass guitar); Joe Donnell (saxophone/piano); Leonard Walters (rhythm guitar)

Tommy & The Tom Toms (later known as The Bill Smith Combo) was an American musical group from 1959 to 1962 playing rock and roll, rhythm & blues, and rockabilly.

== History ==
The group first started with two guitars and drums, Eddie Wayne Hill on lead guitar, Leonard Walters on rhythm guitar and Joel Colbert on drums. The three fledgling musicians from Arlington, Texas began jamming in an old barn in 1959 and evolved to playing around town for private parties. This exposure led to regular Friday night appearances at a small, local lounge. Bass guitarist David A. Martin joined the group a few months later. The owner of the Guthrey Club in Dallas heard the band and hired them for an indefinite engagement. At Guthrey's, one of the largest rhythm and blues clubs in city, the band completed their personnel by adding Joe Donnell on sax and Tommy Brown as vocalist. The band was now complete and decided to change their name to Tommy & The Tom Toms. They soon became one of the top, and most imitated, dance bands in the DFW area and recorded numerous singles for noted Fort Worth producer Major Bill Smith.

One of their best-selling records was an instrumental version of "Heartbreak Hotel" issued by Chess Records (#1773) in 1960 under the pseudonym of the Bill Smith Combo More Tom Toms recordings were soon released, including "Raunchy"/"Loco" issued by Chess (#1780) as the Bill Smith Combo, "Ptomaine"/"Snookie" issued by LeBill (#306) as the Bill Smith Combo, "Ptomaine"/"Heartbreak Hotel" issued by Sparton Records Canada (#4-857) as the Bill Smith Combo, "Anastasia"/"Tough" issued by LeBill (#303) as the Bill Smith Combo, "Souix"/"Are You Lonesome Tonight" issued by LeCamp (#1900) as Mr. Saks & The Blue Strings, "Tomahawk"/"Kentucky Waltz" issued by Jaro International (#77023) as Tom Brown and The Tom Toms, "Tippin' In"/"Saints" issued by Duncan (#1003) as Tommy And The Tom Toms, "That Cat"/"Tell Me" issued by K&B (#101) as Tommy Brown, "Corsicana"/"The Den" issued by Rodeo Canada (#247) as The Tom Toms and "The Waltz You Saved for Me"/"Big Blue Diamonds" issued by Maridene (#106) as Gene Summers & Platinum Fog. During this time frame they also backed up Freddy Fender on his Argo release "A Man Can Cry" b/w "You're Something Else For Me" (Argo No. 5375) plus several other Freddy Fender recordings including the much later Fender release of "Since I Met You Baby".

After a successful years' stay at Guthrey's, the club owner, K.K. Hayles, signed the band to a personal management contract. For the next year the band backed-up numerous recording stars including Roy Orbison, Jimmy Reed, Jerry Lee Lewis, Mark Dinning, Jack Scott, Big Joe Turner, Bobby Hendricks, Gene Summers, Skip & Flip, Freddy Fender, Scotty McKay, The Carlos Brothers, Chuck Berry, The Original Drifters and once staged a battle of the bands with The Champs of "Tequila" fame. Due to the popularity of their recording of "Heartbreak Hotel" they officially changed the band's name to the Bill Smith Combo in 1960. Shortly after this fruitful musical period, Tommy Brown and the Tom Toms aka Bill Smith Combo decided to go their separate ways. Brown returned to his home state of Florida and the remainder of the Tom Toms, now without a singer and frontman, became the backing band for rockabilly entertainer Gene Summers, the new band being known as Gene Summers & The Tom Toms. This group continued with numerous line-up changes before finally splitting up in 1965. Dave Martin went on to join Sam Samudio's band, which became Sam the Sham and the Pharaohs, while Eddie Hill was killed in a car crash just south of Decatur, Texas in early 1962.

== Other sources ==
- "Reba: My Story: by Reba Mcentire (published by Bantam Books, 1994 United States (pages 56–57).
- Rockabilly: A Forty-Year Journey by Billy Poore (published by Hal Leonard 1998) United States
- The International Who's Who in Popular Music 2002 by Andy Gregory (Published by Routledge 2002, United States)
- The Handbook Of Texas Online (c)Texas State Historical Association (published at The University Of Texas at Austin) 2007, United States (online)
- Official Price Guide To Records by Jerry Osborne (published by House of Collectibles) United States
- Chess Records Discography (online) United States
- Texas Music by Rick Koster (published by St. Martin's Press USA 2000) United States
- Jamie Records Discography (online) United States
- Jubilee Records Artist Roster (online) United States
- Charay Records Discography (online) United States
- Alta Records Discography United States
- W&G Records artists Australia
- Who's Who In The South And Southwest (published by Marquis Who's Who In America 1984-1985 Edition) United States
- Article and sessionography in issue 15 (1977) of New Kommotion Magazine UK
- Article and sessionography in issue 23 (1980) of New Kommotion Magazine UK
- Feature article and sessionography in issue 74 (1999) of Rockin' Fifties Magazine Germany
- Feature article with photo spread in issue 53 (2000) of Bill Griggs' Rockin' 50s Magazine United States
- Feature Article with photo spread in issue 54 (2000) of Bill Griggs' Rockin' 50s Magazine United States
