= David A. Martin (musician) =

American songwriter

- Born: March 20, 1937; Dallas, Texas
- Origin: Dallas, Texas, United States
- Died: August 2, 1987 (aged 50); Garland, Texas
- Genres: Rock and roll, rockabilly. R&B
- Occupation(s): Musician, songwriter, singer
- Instrument: Bass guitar
- Years active: 1959–1966
- Labels: MGM Records; Chess Records; Alta Records; Sparton Records (Canada); Dingo Records; Various Indie labels

David A. Martin (March 20, 1937 – August 2, 1987) was an American founding member and original bass player for the rock group Sam the Sham and the Pharaohs, and recorded all their early hits on MGM Records. After leaving the group in late 1965, he returned to Garland, Texas, a Dallas suburb, where he operated a television and video repair shop, located on Lavon Drive (Highway 78), until his death.

A native of Dallas, Texas, Martin started his musical career in 1959 with a band called Tommy & the Tom Toms, which became The Bill Smith Combo in 1960, and recorded several singles for Chess Records. He also worked with Gene Summers, Freddy Fender and Scotty McKay. He was married to Jean Martin on February 17, 1964 and they had one daughter, Denise. Martin died in August 1987 from a heart attack, at the age of 50.
