= Deanna Summers =

Deanna (Dea) Summers
- Born: Deanna Trentham
- Origin: Mississippi, United States
- Genres: Popular music Rock and Roll
- Occupations: Songwriter; Music publisher Model
- Years active: 1957-2008
- Labels: Silicon Music, BMI; Front Row Records; Capri Records; Tear Drop Records; Charay Records; Enviken Records; Overtone Records

Deanna (Dea) Summers (May 30, 1940 – February 14, 2017, in Garland, Texas) was an American writer, songwriter, and music publisher. She was the co-founder of Silicon Music Publishers in 1965, Domino Records in 1968, and Front Row Records in 1976. Her first commercial recordings as an artist were in 1976 – her best-known tracks include "Ballad Of Moon Dog Mayne" (1976) and "Do You Think I'm Sexy" (1979).

== Biography ==
Summers was born in New Albany, Mississippi, in 1940. Her family relocated to Memphis, Tennessee, in 1952, where she attended Kingsbury Jr. High School. She also attended Humes High School before her family relocated to Dallas, Texas. She was an active member of Broadcast Music Incorporated (BMI) as both a songwriter and publisher affiliate from 1965. She was co-owner of Silicon Music Publishing, and many of her compositions have been recorded by various artists.

In 1977 she wrote "Goodbye Priscilla (Bye Bye Baby Blue)" as a tribute to Elvis Presley and Priscilla Presley. The song was issued by Tear Drop Records in 1977 and became one of her best-known compositions. The "Goodbye Priscilla" 45 is now highly collectible and has been issued on several Elvis Presley tribute compilation albums and CDs. She later met with Priscilla Presley and personally presented her with a copy of the original 45rpm record.

Summers was profiled in the Dictionary of International Biography (1982 Edition published by IBC Cambridge). She was also profiled in Songwriter's Market (1979–Present) published by Writer's Digest Books.

Deanna Summers was married to Rockabilly musician Gene Summers from 1961 until her death in 2017. They have three sons Dusty, Steve and Shawn.

Her compositions include: "Ballad Of Moondog Mayne"; "Baby Please Tell Me Why"; "Crazy Cat Corner"; ""Domino"; "Don't Let Me Down Baby"; "Goodbye Priscilla (Bye Bye Baby Blue)"; "Honey Your Mind's Working Overtime"; "Hot Pants"; "I Love A Mystery"; "Just Together"; "Long Story Song"; "My Yearbook"; "Rat Fink"; "Rockin' Fever"; "So"; "Still The Grand Ole Opry Queen"; "Who Stole The Marker (From The Grave Of Bonnie Parker)".

== Sources ==
- BMI Repertoire Search (online)
- Front-page article (published by The Garland Daily News), June 1, 1965, Texas
- "Nashville Report" by Paul Perry (published by Record World Magazine, New York) July 6, 1968
- WYNK-AM Radio, Baton Rouge, Louisiana (Jim Horn P.D.), August 31, 1968
- Tuscaloosa News, May 3, 1970, Alabama
- WESO-AM Radio, Oxford, Massachusetts, May 19, 1970
- WNTC-AM Radio, Potsdam, New York, November 16, 1970
- KGCP-AM Radio, Grafton, North Dakota, December 1, 1970
- Disc Collector Magazine issue #35, January 1971 USA
- "Bill Gavin's Personal Picks" (published by The Gavin Report), February 5, 1971 USA
- "Newcomer Picks" (published by Cash Box Magazine, New York), February 13, 1971
- "Nashville Scene" (published by Billboard Magazine, New York), April 3, 1971
- "A Song On Hot Pants" (published by The Sun Newspaper, Melbourne, Australia), May 3, 1971
- "DJ's Corner" by Bill Jones (published by The Music City News, Nashville), July 1971
- Tuscaloosa News, September 13, 1971, Alabama
- "Variety Talk" by Glen Kelly (published by Brite-Star News), May issue, 1971 USA
- "Platta Chatta 'n Stuff" by H.V. Schreiner (published by Country Corner, New York), July 1971,
- "Signings" (published by Billboard Magazine, N.Y.), April 7, 1979
- "Showcase" (published by The Garland Daily News), August 28, 1980, Texas
- Dictionary of International Biography 1982 Edition (published by IBC Cambridge) USA
