= You Said You Loved Me =

Single by Gene Summers
- A-side: "You Said You Loved Me"
- B-side: "Tomorrow"
- Released: 1962
- Recorded: 1961
- Genre: Rockabilly
- Length: 2:06
- Label: Alta Records (distributed by Big State Distributors)
- Songwriter: Glenn Keener

"You Said You Loved Me" is a song written by Glenn Keener in 1961 and published by Gant Music, BMI. It was first recorded by Gene Summers in 1961. The recording session took place in Fort Worth, Texas at Clifford Herring Studios. Musicians included Summers-vocals, Glenn Keener-guitar, Freddie Powers-bass, Art McNulty-organ and an unknown drummer. It was released on Alta Records (#104) on February 2, 1962 and was flipped with the ASCAP pop, standard tune "Tomorrow" written by (Spiltany-Wilhite-Hirsh).

"You Said You Loved Me" was re-issued in 1963 as the flip side of Summers' hit single "Big Blue Diamonds" and was also included on the 1997 CD "Gene Summers-The Ultimate School Of Rock & Roll".

== Cover versions ==
- Sid & Billy King - Unissued studio track recorded 1988, United States

== Discography references ==
Gene Summers discography from Rockin' Country Style, United States
Gene Summers discography from Rocky Productions, France
Gene Summers discography from Wangdangdula Finland
Gene Summers session data from Tapio's Fin-A-Billy, Finland

== Sources ==
- Liner notes "The Ultimate School Of Rock & Roll" 1997 United States
- "Cover Versions Of The Songs Made Famous By Gene Summers" 2007 United States
- Article and sessionography in issue 15 (1977) of New Kommotion Magazine UK
- Article and sessionography in issue 23 (1980) of New Kommotion Magazine UK
- Feature article and sessionography in issue 74 (1999) of Rockin' Fifties Magazine Germany
- Feature article with photo spread in issue 53 (2000) of Bill Griggs' Rockin' 50s Magazine United States
- Feature Article with photo spread in issue 54 (2000) of Bill Griggs' Rockin' 50s Magazine United States
