= Goodbye Priscilla (Bye Bye Baby Blue) =

Single by Gene Summers
- A-side: "Goodbye Priscilla (Bye Bye Baby Blue)"
- B-side: "World Of Illusion"
- Released: 1977
- Recorded: 1977
- Genre: Rockabilly
- Length: 2:20
- Label: Tear Drop Records (Distributed by Jamie/Guyden Records. USA)
- Songwriters: Deanna Summers, David G. Saxton, Ben Shaw

"Goodbye Priscilla (Bye Bye Baby Blue)" is a song written by Deanna Summers, David Saxton and Ben Shaw. It was published by Silicon Music, BMI in 1977 and first recorded by Gene Summers that same year. The song was initially released by Tear Drop Records as a one-sided, promotional, single and later re-issued with "World Of Illusion" as the flip side (#TD 3405).

"Goodbye Priscilla" was written as a tribute to Elvis and Priscilla Presley. The "Goodbye Priscilla" 45 is now a much-sought-after collectible and has been issued on several Elvis "tribute" compilation albums and CDs. When "Goodbye Priscilla (Bye Bye Baby Blue)" was first released there was a controversy about which Priscilla it was written for: Priscilla Presley, or Priscilla Davis, wife of T. Cullen Davis and central figure in the T. Cullen Davis murder trials. In his book Blood Will Tell: The Murder Trials Of Cullen Davis author Gary Cartwright credited the song (page 199) as referring to Priscilla Davis.

== Discography references ==
Gene Summers discography from Rockin' Country Style, United States
Gene Summers discography from Rocky Productions, France
Gene Summers discography from Wangdangdula Finland
Gene Summers session data from Tapio's Fin-A-Billy, Finland

== Sources ==
- "Blood Will Tell: The Murder Trials Of T. Cullen Davis" by Gary Cartwright (published by Pocket Books USA 1978/1980)
- Liner notes "The Ultimate School Of Rock & Roll" 1997 United States
- Article and sessionography in issue 15 (1977) of New Kommotion Magazine UK
- Article and sessionography in issue 23 (1980) of New Kommotion Magazine UK
- Feature article and sessionography in issue 74 (1999) of Rockin' 1950s Magazine Germany
- Feature article with photo spread in issue 53 (2000) of Bill Griggs' Rockin' 1950s Magazine United States
- Feature Article with photo spread in issue 54 (2000) of Bill Griggs' Rockin' 1950s Magazine United States
