= Do Right Daddy =

Studio album by Gene Summers
- Released: 2004
- Recorded: Sweden
- Genres: Rockabilly, rock 'n roll
- Label: Enviken (Sweden)
- Producer: Patrik Staffansson

Gene Summers chronology
The Ultimate School of Rock & Roll (1997)	Do Right Daddy (2004)	Reminisce Cafe (2008)

Do Right Daddy is an album by Gene Summers. It was recorded at Enviken Studios, Enviken, Sweden on August 5, 2002. The back-up band included Ulf Back, Jonas Olpers, Patrik Staffansson, Riley McOwen, Lars Sodervall, Ulf Torstensson and Henrik Eriksson. Two of the tracks on this album, "Little Lu Ann" and "Boogie Rock," were written by James McClung who also composed "School Of Rock 'n Roll" "Alabama Shake" and "Fancy Dan" for Summers in the 1950s. McClung was also a founding member of Gene Summers and the Rebels in 1957.

"Do Right Daddy" was produced by Patrik Staffansson. The CD was released by Enviken Records in 2004 and is in print.

== Reviews ==
Gene Summers - Do Right Daddy [ENREC122]

- "Gene Summers is a Rock 'n' Roll legend who has still got it! The cat that cut classics like 'School Of Rock 'n Roll', 'Alabama Shake' and 'Nervous' has returned to the studio to cut an album with musicians from Sonny Rogers & The Kingpins and Riley McOwen & The Sleazy Rustic Boys. Also making a guest appearance on saxophone is (Bill Haley's) Comets legend Joey D'Ambrosio. Gene Summers still sounds great, and with these top musicians you are assured of a Killer album!" -Raucous Records, 2004 UK
- "-All told "Do Right Daddy" is like a breathe [sic?] of fresh air. This is how new albums from 50s originals
  should sound. Ten out of ten". -Trevor Cajiao, Now Dig This! Magazine, 2004 UK
- ".....about 65 years of age, Gene Summers sings and rocks like he did 45 years ago, when he recorded the immortal "School Of Rock 'n Roll".......it took Enviken over a year to get this session ("Do Right Daddy") released, but it was sure worth waiting for!" -Black Cat Rockabilly. 2004 Europe (online)
- "Gene was one of the first rockabillies ever to visit Norway. I've been a fan since I heard "School Of Rock 'n Roll" over 20 years ago, and it's great to hear he still delivers!" -Flipside Records, 2004 Norway
- "Gene Summers is a true Rock & Roll legend since his recordings of tracks like 'School Of Rock 'n Roll', 'Alabama Shake' & 'Nervous' some 40 years ago. We cut 11 tracks here in Enviken in 2002 with him & this cat still has a fantastic voice, it's hard to believe that he is a day older than 30! From pure Rock & Roll to primitive Rockabilly. Gene is backed by members from other Enviken bands like: Sonny Rogers & The Kingpins, Riley McOwen & The Sleazy Rustic Boys & Red Roosters. Another legend is also featured on this album: Joey d'Ambrosio from The Comets plays the sax on two of the tracks. On top of that Gene Summers has supplied us with four tracks of which one of them is an instrumental track recorded at the same session as 'Nervous' in 1958, to which he added vocals a few years ago. This is a Rock & Roll legend that still got IT!" -Enviken Records Sweden

== Track listing ==
1. "Be-Bop City" (Dan Edwards)
2. "Hot Rod Baby" (Dick Reinhart, Gene Summers)
3. "I'm Flyin' In" (Sonny Fisher)
4. "Boogie Rock" (James McClung)
5. "Shake It Around" (Sonny Fisher)
6. "Little Lu Ann" (James McClung)
7. "Do Right Daddy" (Dan Edwards)
8. "Long Story Song" (Dea Summers, Gene Summers)
9. "Look At Me" (Jimmy Velvit)
10. "Baby Please Tell Me Why" (Dea Summers, John Rathburn)
11. "The Rebel - Johnny Yuma" (Markowitch, Senadi)
12. "Crazy Cat Corner" (Dea Summers, Gene Summers)
13. "She Bops a Lot" (Floyd Dakil)
14. "It's Love Baby (24 Hours a Day)" (Ted Jarrett)
15. "So" (Dea Summers, Gene Summers)

== Sources ==
- Liner notes "The Ultimate School Of Rock & Roll" 1997 United States
- Article and sessionography in issue 15 (1977) of New Kommotion Magazine UK
- Article and sessionography in issue 23 (1980) of New Kommotion Magazine UK
- Feature article and sessionography in issue 74 (1999) of Rockin' Fifties Magazine Germany
- Feature article with photo spread in issue 53 (2000) of Bill Griggs' Rockin' 50s Magazine United States
- Feature Article with photo spread in issue 54 (2000) of Bill Griggs' Rockin' 50s Magazine United States
