= The Southern Cat Rocks On =

Studio album by Gene Summers
- Released: 1975
- Recorded: Dallas, Texas
- Genre: Rock 'n roll, rockabilly
- Label: Lake County (Switzerland)
- Producer: Marvin Montgomery, Gene Summers, A Michael Cattin Production

Gene Summers chronology
| Rock 'n Roll Volume 2. (1973) | The Southern Cat Rocks On (1975) | Mister Rock And Roll (1977) |

The Southern Cat Rocks On is a 12" vinyl album by Gene Summers, his second album release. It is a compilation of tracks he recorded in Texas between 1962 and 1975.

== Production and album credits ==
All selections were recorded at Real To Reel Studios, Garland, Texas except "Dance Dance Dance", "Chapel Bells Ringing" and "Almost 12:O'Clock" (Top Ten Studios, Dallas) and "Bonnie Parker" (Summit Sound Studio, Dallas). Session musicians included James McClung, Glen Keener, David (Dave) Martin, Charlie Mendias, Melvin Robinson, Joe Cook, Al Struble, Larry Jannasch and Kenny Hargis plus the Joe Ramirez Combo. Background vocals: Al Struble, Glen Struble and Larry Jannasch. Engineers: Dave Garner, Bob ("Git-It") Kelly and Bob Sullivan. Producers include Marvin "Smokey" Montgomery and Gene Summers. A Michael Cattin Production. It was released in 1975, on the Swiss Lake County Records label.

== Track listing ==
1. Spoken Introduction
2. "Almost 12:O'Clock"
3. "Wine Wine Wine"
4. "Chapel Bells Ringing"
5. "Leroy"
6. "Lover Please"
7. "Who Stole The Marker (From the Grave of Bonnie Parker)?"
8. "Dance Dance Dance"
9. "Mad Mad World"
10. "Good Rockin' Tonight"
11. "Memphis"
12. "Long Tall Texan"
13. "Fannie Mae"

== Sources ==
- Liner notes "The Ultimate School Of Rock & Roll" 1997 United States
- Article and sessionography in issue 15 (1977) of New Kommotion Magazine UK
- Article and sessionography in issue 23 (1980) of New Kommotion Magazine UK
- Feature article and sessionography in issue 74 (1999) of Rockin' Fifties Magazine Germany
- Feature article with photo spread in issue 53 (2000) of Bill Griggs' Rockin' 50s Magazine United States
- Feature Article with photo spread in issue 54 (2000) of Bill Griggs' Rockin' 50s Magazine United States
