= Texas Rock and Roll =

Studio album by Gene Summers
- Released: 1981
- Recorded: Dallas, Fort Worth
- Genres: Rock 'n roll, rockabilly
- Label: Big Beat (France)
- Producers: Marvin Montgomery, Gene Summers, Joseph W. Pitts, Michael Cattin, Jacky Chalard-Executive Producer

Gene Summers chronology
Mister Rock and Roll (1977)	Texas Rock and Roll (1981)	Gene Summers In Nashville (1981)

Texas Rock And Roll is a 10" vinyl album by American rockabilly singer Gene Summers. It was released by the French Big Beat label in 1981. It is a compilation of early rock 'n roll recordings by Gene Summers covering a time period from 1962 through 1975.

== Production and album credits ==
Session musicians included: James McClung, Benny Williams, Gary Moon, René Hall, Plas Johnson, Earl Palmer, Red Callender, David (Dave) Martin, Glen Keener, Charlie Mendias, Mel Robinson, Bobby Rambo, Joe Ramirez Combo, Jack Castleberry, C. B. Williams, Ernest Walker, Joe Cook, Al Struble, Larry Jannasch, Kenny Hargis, Dan Edwards, Glen Struble, Eddie Wayne Hill, Joel Colbert, Leonard Walters, Joe Donnell, Tommy Morrell, Art McNulty, Ronnie Dawson, Marvin ("Smokey") Montgomery, Bill Hudson, Dale Sellers, Jerry Stembridge, David Briggs, Stu Basore, Charlie McCoy, Mike Leech and Hayward Bishop. The background vocal groups were The Five Masks and The Jordanaires plus (Al Struble, Dan Edwards & Glen Struble).

== Track listing ==
1. "Wine Wine Wine"
2. "Leroy"
3. "Who Stole The Marker (From the Grave of Bonnie Parker)?"
4. "Mad Mad World"
5. "I've Had It"
6. "Mister Rock and Roll"
7. "I Got a Baby"
8. "A Man Can Cry"
9. "Rockin' Daddy"
10. "Big Blue Diamonds"

== Discography references ==
Gene Summers discography from Rockin' Country Style, United States
Gene Summers discography from Rocky Productions, France
Gene Summers discography from Wangdangdula Finland
Gene Summers session data from Tapio's Fin-A-Billy, Finland

== Sources ==
- Liner notes "The Ultimate School Of Rock & Roll" 1997 United States
- Article and sessionography in issue 15 (1977) of New Kommotion Magazine UK
- Article and sessionography in issue 23 (1980) of New Kommotion Magazine UK
- Feature article and sessionography in issue 74 (1999) of Rockin' Fifties Magazine Germany
- Feature article with photo spread in issue 53 (2000) of Bill Griggs' Rockin' 50s Magazine United States
- Feature Article with photo spread in issue 54 (2000) of Bill Griggs' Rockin' 50s Magazine United States
