= Mister Rock and Roll =

Studio album by Gene Summers
- Released: 1977
- Recorded: Dallas, Fort Worth
- Genres: Rock, rockabilly
- Label: Lake County
- Producers: Gene Summers, Joseph W. Pitts, Michael Cattin

Gene Summers chronology
The Southern Cat Rocks On (1975)	Mister Rock and Roll (1977)	Texas Rock and Roll (1981)

Mister Rock and Roll is a 12", vinyl record album (LP) by Gene Summers, issued by Lake County Records in 1977. It was Summers's second album released by the Swiss label.

== Production and album credits ==
All tracks were recorded at Real To Reel Studios in Dallas, Texas on July 21 and 28, 1977 with the exception of "Taboo", "Big Blue Diamonds" and "A Man Can Cry". "Taboo" and "Big Blue Diamonds" were recorded at the Clifford Herring Studios in Fort Worth, Texas in 1959 and 1963 respectively, and "A Man Can Cry" was recorded at Sumit Sound in Dallas in 1975. The album was produced by Gene Summers and the executive producer was Michael Cattin. Recording engineer and mixdown by Dave Garner. Musicians included Joe Cook, Al Struble, Glen Struble, Kenny Hargis, Dan Edwards, Eddie Wayne Hill, Joel Colbert, Joe Donnell, Leonard Walters, David (Dave) Martin, James McClung, Jack Castleberry, Charlie Mendias, Ernest Walker, C.B. Williams, Buddy Stephens and Larry Jannasch. Background vocals were provided by Dan Edwards, Al Struble, Glen Struble and Tom Cunningham.

== Track listing ==
1. "Mister Rock and Roll"
2. "As Long As I Have You"
3. "Down on the Farm"
4. "You Need My Love"
5. "I Got a Baby"
6. "A Man Can Cry"
7. "Cool Baby"
8. "I've Had It"
9. "You're Gonna Be Sorry"
10. "Taboo"
11. "Rockin' Daddy"
12. "Big Blue Diamonds" (with background vocals added)

== Discography references ==
Gene Summers discography from Rockin' Country Style, US
Gene Summers discography from Rocky Productions, France
Gene Summers discography from Wangdangdula Finland
Gene Summers session data from Tapio's Fin-A-Billy, Finland

== Sources ==
- Liner notes "The Ultimate School of Rock & Roll" 1997 US
- Article and sessionography in issue 15 (1977) of New Kommotion Magazine UK
- Article and sessionography in issue 23 (1980) of New Kommotion Magazine UK
- Feature article and sessionography in issue 74 (1999) of Rockin' Fifties Magazine Germany
- Feature article with photo spread in issue 53 (2000) of Bill Griggs' Rockin' 50s Magazine US
- Feature Article with photo spread in issue 54 (2000) of Bill Griggs' Rockin' 50s Magazine US
