= I'll Never Be Lonely =

Single by Gene Summers & His Rebels
- A-side: "Twixteen"
- B-side: "I'll Never Be Lonely"
- Released: 1958
- Genre: Rockabilly
- Length: 2:15
- Label: Jan/Jane Records (distributed by Jay Gee Record Corp.)
- Songwriter: Mary Tarver

I'll Never Be Lonely is a song written by Mary Tarver in 1958 and published by Ted Music, BMI. It was first recorded by Gene Summers and His Rebels in 1958 and issued by Jan/Jane Records that same year. "I'll Never Be Lonely" was recorded at Master Recorders in Los Angeles, California in 1958 during the "School of Rock 'n Roll"/"Straight Skirt" sessions. Musicians featured were the original Rebels: Gene Summers on vocals and guitar, James McClung on lead guitar, Gary Moon on drums, and Benny Williams on slap bass. The flipside of "I'll Never Be Lonely" was "Twixteen".

== Reviews ==
BILLBOARD MAGAZINE - January 26, 1959 Reviews of New Pop Records, page 48
GENE SUMMERS
I'll Never Be Lonely ***
JANE 106 - Gene Summers sells this rockaballad with warmth, helped by a chorus and a big beat from the combo. It's in the current groove and has a chance. (Ted, BMI)

== Sources ==
- Billboard (magazine) - January 26, 1959 Reviews of New Pop Records, page 48 United States
- Liner notes "The Ultimate School Of Rock & Roll" 1997 United States
- "Cover Versions Of The Songs Made Famous By Gene Summers" 2007 United States
- Article and sessionography in issue 15 (1977) of New Kommotion Magazine UK
- Article and sessionography in issue 23 (1980) of New Kommotion Magazine UK
- Feature article and sessionography in issue 74 (1999) of Rockin' Fifties Magazine Germany
- Feature article with photo spread in issue 53 (2000) of Bill Griggs' Rockin' 50s Magazine United States
- Feature Article with photo spread in issue 54 (2000) of Bill Griggs' Rockin' 50s Magazine United States

== See also ==
Rockin' Country Style
