= Reminisce Cafe =

Studio album by Gene Summers
- Released: February 1, 2008
- Recorded: Texas
- Genres: Rockabilly, rock 'n roll
- Length: 42:48
- Label: Seduction
- Producer: Phil York

Gene Summers chronology
Do Right Daddy (2004)	Reminisce Cafe (2008)	Rock 'n Roll Volume 2. (1973)

Reminisce Cafe is a landmark album by Gene Summers, released in 2008. It is his 50th anniversary album issued by Seduction Records on February 1, 2008, exactly 50 years to the day of the release of his first hit single "School of Rock 'n Roll"/"Straight Skirt".

== Track listing ==
1. "Reminisce Cafe" (Joe Hardin Brown) – 3:29
2. "She Bops a Lot" (Floyd Dakil) – 2:19
3. "Just Together" (Dea Summers, Shawn Summers, Gene Summers) – 2:59
4. "Rockin' Fever" (Dea Summers, Gene Summers) – 2:12
5. "Crazy Cat Corner" (Dea Summers, Gene Summers) – 2:20
6. "I Won't Take Any Less" (William Becker) – 2:11
7. "(It's Love Baby) 24 Hours a Day" (Ted Jarrett) – 2:58
8. "Do a Little Roll" (Jacky Guerard) – 2:56
9. "Heartbreak City Limits" (Gene Summers) – 2:48
10. "Love Me Tender" (Vera Matson, Elvis Presley) – 2:54
11. "Gonna Drive 'em Up a Wall" (Shawn Summers, Gene Summers) – 2:18
12. "So" – (Dea Summers, Gene Summers) – 2:36

=== Bonus tracks ===
(Bonus tracks are excerpts from Gene Summers' album "Do Right Daddy" recorded in Sweden in 2002. The album was produced by Patrik Staffansson and released by Enviken Records.)
13. "Be-Bop City" (Dan Edwards) – 2:35
14. "Hot Rod Baby" (Dick Reinhart, Gene Summers) – 2:26
15. "I'm Flyin' In' (Sonny Fisher) – 2:30
16. "Little LuAnn" (James McClung) – 2:53

== Musicians ==
- Guitar – Jerry Sartain, Bobby Rambo, Floyd Dakil, Kevin Bailey, Rene Hall, James McClung, Gene Summers
- Bass – Terry Vieregge, Red Callendar
- Drums – Chip Abernathy, Earl Palmer, Lavelle Jones, Bobby Hibbits
- Piano/Keyboards – Ron Mason, Jay Brown, Chuck Mabry
- Harmonica – Paul Harrington, Chuck Mabry (on "So")
- Background vocals – Kevin Bailey, Shawn Summers
- Congas (on "Heartbreak City Limits") – Matthew Fortichuki
- Saxophone – Plas Johnson

=== Bonus tracks ===
- Guitar – Ulf Back, Jonas Olpers, Gene Summers
- Slap bass – Ulf Torstensson
- Drums – Patrik Staffansson
- Piano – Henrik Eriksson
- Saxophone – Joey D'Ambrosio
- Background vocals – Lars Sodervall, Riley McOwen and Ulf Back

== Production notes ==
- Producer – Phil York
- Recorded at Yorktown Digital Works, Irving, Texas
- Engineered and Mastered by Phil York
- Graphics design and layout – Stuart Fleming, Shawn Summers
- Liner notes – Ron Chapman
- CD replication – Green Room Productions, Carrollton, Texas
- Photo credits – Steve Summers, Phil York, Pearl Moore Summers and Gene Summers Archives

== Reviews ==
Bear Family Records: (2008/SEDUCTION) 16 tracks - "Superb new album of old school Rock & Roll, Rockabilly and Ballads. Recorded in Texas (produced by Phil York) and featuring the legendary Bobby Rambo !, Rene Hall, Earl Palmer a.o. 50th Anniversary after the release of "School Of Rock & Roll" 1958 !"

CD Baby: "The venerable and early rock n roll legend Gene Summers celebrates his 50th anniversary in music recording (starting in Feb. 1958!) with this new CD of sixteen songs in the early rock n roll style, and with a few edging over into the rockabilly style! The title song, "Reminisce Cafe" is chart bound and is already being played by a number of vintage music radio stations. For some listeners, the punch-line in the song prompts tears of remembrance. The album was produced by 3-Grammy recording engineer and producer Phil York, and CD notes were written by legendary disc jockey and celebrity radio personality, Ron Chapman. There are twelve relevant photos plus the great, vintage cover photo of Gene and his high school sweetheart and wife, Dea......."

Take Note Magazine (France) - April, 2008 - "Have you heard the news? There's good rockin' tonight with that new CD coming from Texas. Released on February 1st, 2008, exactly 50 years after the release date of Gene's and his Rebels first single, School of Rock'n'Roll (Jan 11-100), that CD is accurately titled Reminisce Cafe. Produced by Phil York with nice liner notes from DJ Ron Chapman, that CD offers 100% Texas rockin' music shaped with the support of great musicians like Bobby Rambo and Joey D'Ambrosio. It's also interesting to note the presence of Red Callendar, Plas Johnson, Rene Hall and Earl Palmer, all legendary session musicians, who backed Gene on his "Jan" sessions in 1958.

The booklet is a neat one with some vintage 1950s and '60s photos plus two full size record label shots. But a record is at first music so let's talk a little about the first song that gives the title to the CD. Reminisce Cafe is a nice ballad where you will meet Elvis, Little Richard, Gene Vincent, Buddy Holly, Bill Haley and Jerry Lee Lewis. A nice place to be! The next song is She Bops a Lot written by Floyd Dakil of Dance Franny Dance fame. The next three songs are originals from Gene and his wife Dea's pen and cover the whole spectrum of 50's music from ballad to guitar lead rockabilly and sax/vocal chorus movin' rockin' ditty. I Won't Take Any Less carries the shades of Elvis and (It's Love Baby) 24 Hours a Day is a moving cover of the Ted Jarrett song first recorded by Louis Brooks, in 1955. From Gene's own pen, Heartbreak City Limits offers more of a country flavor before Gene takes a stroll on Elvis Presley's repertoire with Love Me Tender. The next track Gonna Drive 'em Up A Wall is a wild, rockin', Little Richard styled song written and performed by Gene and his son Shawn as a duet. The remaining songs are all strong rockers, the last four coming from a 2002 session cut in Sweden and already issued on his album Do Right Daddy. As you listen to this album it seems like 1958 is back again! I have heard the news - There's good rockin' tonight." - by camilledad58

== Sources ==
- Liner notes "The Ultimate School of Rock & Roll" 1997 United States
- Article and sessionography in issue 15 (1977) of New Kommotion Magazine UK
- Article and sessionography in issue 23 (1980) of New Kommotion Magazine UK
- Feature article and sessionography in issue 74 (1999) of Rockin' Fifties Magazine Germany
- Feature article with photo spread in issue 53 (2000) of Bill Griggs' Rockin' 50s Magazine United States
- Feature Article with photo spread in issue 54 (2000) of Bill Griggs' Rockin' 50s Magazine United States
