= Manny Guerra =

American record producer (1939–2025)

- Born: Manuel R. Guerra; January 22, 1939
- Died: December 12, 2025 (aged 85); San Antonio, Texas, U.S.
- Occupations: Singer; songwriter; record producer; drummer
- Years active: 1950–2025
- Musical career
- Genres: Tejano; Tex-Mex cumbia; Latin pop
- Labels: Amen Recording Studios
- Formerly of: Sunny and the Sunglows

Manuel R. Guerra, better known as Manny Guerra (January 22, 1939 – December 12, 2025), was an American record producer, music engineer and recording artist, who specialized in Tejano music. Guerra started in the industry playing with Sunny and the Sunglows, recording hit singles such as "Talk to Me", which peaked at number 11 on the United States Billboard Hot 100 and number 12 on the Billboard Hot R&B/Hip-Hop Songs in 1963. His distribution group, Manny Music Inc., is located in San Antonio, Texas, along with his recording studio, AMEN Recording Studios and his record label GP Productions. On August 30, 1992, BMG Music entered a distribution deal with Manny Music Inc., during the 1990s Tejano music golden age. BMG was the third large-scale company to enter the Tejano music market after Sony Discos and EMI Latin, respectively. However, in November 1992, BMG and Guerra parted ways due to management style differences. Guerra's AMEN Studios was considered to be one of the most active recording studios in the state of Texas, which utilised MCI equipment.

Guerra produced a number of artists including, Augustine Ramirez, Jay Perez, Sunny Ozuna, Culturas, Abraham Quintanilla, and Selena, among others.

== Life and career ==
Manny Guerra was born in 1939 or 1940 to Lucia R. Guerra. His first musical instrument was the accordion. He began his career as a drummer for the Isidro Lopez Orchestra, earning the title "the Gene Krupa of Tejano". In 1960, he became a member of Sunny and the Sunglows, a group whose polka-influenced recording "Peanuts" impacted the Billboard music charts. Guerra's older brother, Rudy, was also a member of the group. Rudy and Sunny Ozuna originally formed the group in the late 1950s at their high school. Sunny and the Sunglows recorded "Talk to Me" (1962), arranged by Manny, where it peaked at number 11 on the US Billboard Hot 100 chart in October 1963. Following the success of "Talk to Me", Ozuna departed the group. Guerra later stated that he felt betrayed and humiliated, stating that he wanted "for the earth to open up and swallow me." and questioned whether the Sunglows could continue as a viable act. Guerra later explained that he was forced out.

Following the acquisition of Sunglow Records, Guerra contemplated withdrawing from the music industry, uncertain about his professional direction. During this period, he experienced a profound religious awakening and felt a strong calling to the ministry. He regarded music as an intrinsic part of his identity and acknowledged the difficulty of reconciling his religious commitments with his musical pursuits. Guerra later observed that the integration of the two had proven viable.

Guerra opened his Amen Recording Studios in San Antonio, Texas. The recording studios were described by Billboard magazine as one of the most active recording facilities in Texas, noted for its modern MCI equipment and expansive high-quality sound. During the recording of his album at Amen, musician Augustine Ramirez was informed of Guerra's policy prohibiting alcohol consumption and profanity within the facility. While Ramirez laughed at the policy, he remarked that an understanding of Guerra's personal convictions was essential to appreciating these rules, noting that Guerra's dedication to music and his religious principles made such restrictions a natural extension of his values.

Guerra went on to produce Latin Breed, which emerged as one of the leading Tejano music bands of its era. By 1973, Guerra was actively producing nine artists under his label. In September 1973, Guerra announced plans to expand the studios into a new building located at the same site.

In the 1980s, Selena recorded her first five albums at Amen. According to Guerra, Selena recorded her signature songs "Como La Flor" (1992), "Amor Prohibido" (1994) and "Bidi Bidi Bom Bom" (1994) at Amen Studios. Abraham Quintanilla noted Guerra as someone who "could give you a real good sound", calling him "one of the pioneers of Tejano music". In 1989, Shelly Lares recorded her album "Tu, Solo Tu" at Amen, which produced the commercially successful track of the same name. By 1994, Guerra was a director of the Texas Talent Musicians Association, which produces the Tejano Music Awards.

In 2022, Guerra wrote his memoir "Tejano Music Award Producer", and dedicated it to his then 102-year-old mother. By 2022, Guerra began recording gospel music.

Guerra died from cancer on December 12, 2025, at the age of 85.

== Artistry ==
Josie Norris of the San Antonio Express-News wrote that Guerra's "musicianship, ambition, workaholic intensity, creativity and innovation" within severe financial constraints played a decisive role in the creation of many of the most significant recordings produced in San Antonio, beginning in the early 1960s and extended through the golden age of Tejano music in the 1980s and 1990s. Norris called Guerra "Tejano music's greatest record producer."

Historian Ramon Hernandez said that Guerra "helped create the Tejano sound", noting that Guerra "was the "it" producer". Hernandez credited Guerra with significantly enhancing the sonic fidelity of local recordings through the use of professional studio musicians, background singers, and outside songwriters, including Luis Silva. Hernandez noted that Guerra's development of a distinctive echo and reverberation effect from repurposing a metal gasoline storage tank outfitted with a loudspeaker was part of his innovative spirit.

Guerra deliberately moved away from accordion-heavy tracks in favor of the trendier keyboard synthesiser sound that was emerging.

In a February 2022 interview, Guerra stated that he "never loved music", saying "it was merely a vehicle". This assertion has met with scepticism, particularly among those well acquainted with him. Lares stated that she does not fully understand the claim, while radio personality Henry "Pespi" Pena offered a broader interpretation, observing that "[Guerra] is music." According to Pena, Guerra viewed music as the act of bringing something into existence where nothing had existed before, and it was this creative process that generated the exhilaration that compelled and motivated him.

== Works cited ==
- Saldaña, Hector (February 2, 2022). "An S.A. music legend looks back with a little pride and a lot of regret". San Antonio Express-News.
- Ruiz, Vicki; Sánchez Korrol, Virginia (2006). Latinas in the United States: a historical encyclopedia. Indiana University Press. ISBN 9780253346834.
- Ragland, Catherine Ann (1994). "Voz Del Pueblo Tejano Conjunto Music and the Construction of Tejano Identity in South Texas". University of Washington.
- Peña, Manuel H. (1999). The Mexican American orquesta: music, culture, and the dialectic of conflict (1st ed.). University of Texas Press. ISBN 9780292765870.
- Medina, John Henry (12 December 2025). "Pioneering Tejano Music Producer Manny Guerra Passes Away". Tejano Nation.
- Brite, Charlie (September 8, 1973). "Tex-Mex Sounds Undergo Changes". Billboard. Vol. 85, no. 36.
- Lannert, John (August 1, 1992a). "BMG Takes Up Tejano Via Manny Music". Billboard. Vol. 104, no. 31.
- Lannert, John (November 28, 1992b). "Latin Notas". Billboard. Vol. 104, no. 48.
