= Gene Summers in Nashville =

Studio album by Gene Summers
- Released: 1981
- Studios: Young 'Un Sound, Nashville, Tennessee
- Genres: Rock 'n roll, rockabilly
- Label: Big Beat (France)
- Producers: Chip Young, A Michael Cattin Production

Gene Summers chronology
Texas Rock and Roll (1981)	Gene Summers in Nashville (1981)	School Of Rock 'n Roll (1994)

Gene Summers In Nashville is a 10" vinyl album by Gene Summers. It was recorded at the Young 'Un Sound studio in Nashville, Tennessee in 1980 and contains rockabilly and country tracks performed by Summers. It was issued on the French Big Beat label in 1981.

Backing Summers were some of the Nashville A-Team session musicians including Dale Sellers, Jerry Stembridge, Stu Basore, Charlie McCoy, Mike Leech, Hayward Bishop and The Jordanaires. The session engineers were Stan Dacus and Chip Young. It was produced by Chip Young and was a Michael Cattin production.

== Track listing ==
No.	Title	Writer(s)	Original artist	Length
1.	"Mystery Train"	Junior Parker, Sam Phillips	Little Junior's Blue Flames (1953)	3:17
2.	"I Will Rock And Roll With You"	Cash	Johnny Cash (1978)	2:45
3.	"Put Your Cat Clothes On"	Perkins	Carl Perkins (1973)	3:07
4.	"Blue Monday"	Dave Bartholomew, Domino	Fats Domino (1956)	2:35
5.	"Walk On By"	Kendall Hayes, Gary Walker	Leroy Van Dyke (1961)	2:16
6.	"Singing the Blues"	Melvin Endsley	Guy Mitchell (1956)	2:40
7.	"Big River"	Cash	Johnny Cash (1958)	2:45
8.	"Tennessee Saturday Night"	Billy Hughes	Red Foley (1948)	2:27
9.	"Today I Started Loving You Again"	Haggard, Bonnie Owens	Merle Haggard (1968)	2:14
10.	"I Still Miss Someone"	Cash	Johnny Cash (1958)	2:27
