= School of Rock 'n Roll (album) =

Studio album by Gene Summers
- Released: 1993
- Recorded: 1957–1981, Dallas, Fort Worth, Los Angeles, Nashville
- Genres: Rock 'n roll, rockabilly
- Label: Collector (Netherlands)
- Producers: Jan Records, Gene Summers, Joseph W. Pitts, Marvin Montgomery, Michael Cattin, Skip Young. A Cees Klop Production

Gene Summers chronology
Gene Summers In Nashville (1981)	School of Rock 'n Roll (1993)	The Ultimate School Of Rock & Roll (1997)

School Of Rock & Roll is a CD by Gene Summers. It was his first CD release although many of his recordings had been previously released on various artists compilation albums and CDs. School Of Rock 'n Roll (the album) was issued in 1993 on Collector Records (#4420) out of the Netherlands.

== Production and album credits ==
The original recording sessions were held in Los Angeles, Dallas, Fort Worth and Nashville. The CD contains all his original 1950s hits plus other tracks from the 60s, 70s and even a couple of 80s tracks that were recorded in Nashville in 1981.

The original master tapes, demos and private recordings were used for the production of the CD when available. The CD was produced by Cees Klop. The liner notes were written by Steve Kelemen of Canada.

Session musicians included: James McClung, Benny Williams, Gary Moon, Rene Hall, Plas Johnson, Earl Palmer, Red Callendar, David (Dave) Martin, Glen Keener, Charlie Mendias, Mel Robinson, Bobby Rambo, Joe Ramirez Combo, Jack Castleberry, C. B. Williams, Ernest Walker, Joe Cook, Al Struble, Larry Jannasch, Kenny Hargis, Dan Edwards, Glen Struble, Eddie Wayne Hill, Joel Colbert, Leonard Walters, Joe Donnell, Tommy Morrell, Art McNulty, Ronnie Dawson, Marvin ("Smokey") Montgomery, Bill Hudson, Dale Sellers, Jerry Stembridge, David Briggs, Stu Basore, Charlie McCoy, Mike Leech and Hayward Bishop. The background vocal groups were The Five Masks and The Jordanaires plus (Al Struble, Dan Edwards & Glen Struble).

== Track listing ==
1. "School Of Rock 'n Roll"
2. "Straight Skirt"
3. "Nervous"
4. "Gotta Lotta That"
5. "Twixteen"
6. "I'll Never Be Lonely"
7. "Dance Dance Dance"
8. "Almost 12:O'Clock"
9. "Alabama Shake"
10. "Wine, Wine, Wine"
11. "I've Had It" (Carl Bonura/Ray Ceroni)
12. "Leroy"
13. "Lover Please"
14. "Mad Mad World"
15. "Loco Cat" (instrumental)
16. "Mister Rock And Roll"
17. "Floppin'" (instrumental)
18. "Turnip Greens"
19. "Hey My Baby"
20. "Baby Are You Kiddin'"
21. "You're Gonna Be Sorry"
22. "Honey Hush"
23. "Rockaboogie Shake"
24. "Big Blue Diamonds"
25. "I Got A Baby"
26. "Rockin' Daddy"
27. "Who Stole The Marker (From The Grave Of Bonnie Parker)?"
28. "Blue Monday"
29. "Big River"
30. 'The Rebel"

== Reviews ==
"This 30 tune collection should go a long way in promoting Gene Summers into the upper ranks of 50s rockabilly. From Dallas, Texas, Summers recorded for a number of labels through the years but is best known for the wild rockin' School Of Rock And Roll on the Jan label and the movin' Alabama Shake on Capri. All of his 50s rockers are here and almost all of them are really great too. Gene and his band tear it up on a couple of crude instrumentals as well - Loco Cat (incredible) and Floppin . His later efforts also include more than a few gems like Turnip Greens, Baby Are You Kiddin', Rockaboogie Shake, the ballad Big Blue Diamonds, Sonny Fisher's Rockin' Daddy and the Horton-esque Who Stole The Marker (From The Grave Of Bonnie Parker) . ....... A pretty good legacy I'd say." -(AE) Roots & Rhythm

== Discography references ==
Gene Summers discography from Rockin' Country Style, United States
Gene Summers discography from Rocky Productions, France
Gene Summers discography from Wangdangdula Finland
Gene Summers session data from Tapio's Fin-A-Billy, Finland

== Sources ==
- Liner notes "The Ultimate School Of Rock & Roll" 1997 United States
- Article and sessionography in issue 15 (1977) of New Kommotion Magazine UK
- Article and sessionography in issue 23 (1980) of New Kommotion Magazine UK
- Feature article and sessionography in issue 74 (1999) of Rockin' Fifties Magazine Germany
- Feature article with photo spread in issue 53 (2000) of Bill Griggs' Rockin' 50s Magazine United States
- Feature Article with photo spread in issue 54 (2000) of Bill Griggs' Rockin' 50s Magazine United States
