= Sunny & the Sunglows =

American musical group

Sunny & the Sunglows (formed by songwriters Jimmie Lewing and Sunny Ozuna in Palacios, Texas) were an American musical group started in 1959, and later known as Sunny & the Sunliners in 1963 after moving to San Antonio, Texas.

== Career ==
The group's members were all Chicano-born with the exception of Amos Johnson Jr., and their style was a blend of rhythm and blues, tejano, blues, and mariachi. They first recorded in 1962 for their own label, Sunglow. Okeh Records picked up their single "Golly Gee" for national distribution that year, and in 1963, Huey P Meaux, a producer from Louisiana and owner of Tear Drop Records, had them record a remake of Little Willie John's 1958 hit, "Talk to Me, Talk to Me". The single "Talk to Me" (b/w "Every Week, Every Month, Every Year"), released on Tear Drop Records, went to No. 4 on the Adult Contemporary chart, No. 12 on the US Billboard R&B chart, No. 11 on the Billboard Hot 100 in October 1963, and No. 13 on Canada's CHUM Chart in November.

== Members ==
- Sunny Ozuna – lead vocals
- Vincent Chente Montez – vocals (Bass)
- Manuel Guerra – leader
- Rudy Guerra – tenor sax
- Gregg Ramirez – bass
- Henry Nanez – guitar
- Manuel Martinez – guitar
- Tommy Luna – tenor sax
- Andy Ortiz – piano (Sunglows era)
- Arthur Gonzalez – electric piano
- Martin Liñan – alto sax
- Gilbert Fernandez – tenor sax
- Amos Johnson Jr. – trumpet
- Bobby Solis – drums
- Joel Dilley – bass
- Joe Cortez III – keyboards, vocals (1977–78)
- Johnny Guerra – guitar, vocals
- Carlos Hernandez – alto sax, vocals
- Jimmy Solis – tenor sax, vocals
- Bobby Gutierrez – tenor and bari sax
- David Silva – trumpet
- Roger Rivera – trombone
- David DeLaGarza – keyboards
- Frank Ardila – guitar
- Arturo Alderete - bass (1973–75)
- Charlie Sandoval - percussion

== Discography ==
- Judgement Day (KEY-LOC,1963)
- Talk to Me (Tear Drop Records, LP2000 1964)
- All Night Worker (Tear Drop, LP2019 1964)
- Las Vegas Welcomes (Tear Drop, 1964)
- Adelante (Key-Loc, 1964)
- Think It Over (KEY-LOC, 1964)
- The Original Peanuts (Sunglow Records, LP103 1965)
- Smile Now Cry Later (Key-Loc 3001 1966)
- Live in Hollywood (Key-Loc 3003 1966)
- Put Me In Jail (KEY-LOC, 1967)
- Baby I Apologize (KEY-LOC, 1967)
- Little Brown Eyed Soul (Key-Loc, 1968)
- The Versatile (Key-Loc, 1969)
- Young, Gifted and Brown (Key-Loc, 1971)
- El Orgullo de Texas (Key-Loc, 1974)
- El Preferido (Key-Loc, 1974)
- Yesterday...& Sunny (Teardrop Records, 1976)
- Siempre (Key-Loc, 1976)
- Palabritas (Key-Loc, 1976)
- Andale Mi Amor (Key-Loc, 1977)
- This Is My Band (Key-Loc 3006 1977)
- Live in Las Vegas (Key-Loc, 1978)
- Yesterday and Sunny Vol. II (Key-Loc, 1978)
- Grande Grande Grande (Key-Loc, 1978)
- Vengo a Verte (Key-Loc, 1979)
- Cry (Key-Loc, 1980)
- El Amante: Sunny & The Sunliners (Freddie Records – LP-026 1981)
