= Gotta Lotta That =

Single by Gene Summers & His Rebels
- A-side: "Nervous"
- B-side: "Gotta Lotta That"
- Released: 1958
- Recorded: 1958 - Hollywood, CA
- Genre: Rockabilly
- Length: 2:05
- Label: Jan/Jane Records (Jay Gee Record Corp.); Jubilee Records; Apex Records (Canada)
- Songwriter: Bernice Bedwell

"Gotta Lotta That" is a song written by Bernice Bedwell in 1958 and published by Song Productions, BMI. It was first recorded by Gene Summers and His Rebels in 1958 and issued by Jan/Jane Records. The "Gotta Lotta That" recording session took place at the Liberty Records Studios in Hollywood, California and featured Rene Hall and James McClung on guitar, Plas Johnson on saxophone, Earl Palmer on drums, and George "Red" Callendar on bass. The flipside of "Gotta Lotta That" was "Nervous".

== Reviews ==
Billboard - June 1958 - 'Reviews of New Pop Records' by Gene Summers - "Gotta Lotta That" - "A swinging, blues effort that really moves and rocks. Good sound and solid performance by Summers with fine guitar support".

== "Gotta Lotta That" cover versions ==
- Johnny Devlin - New Zealand
- Andy Lee & Tennessee Rain - Germany
- Rudy Lacrioux & The All-Stars - UK

== Sources ==
- Billboard Magazine- June 1958 Reviews of New Pop Records United States
- Liner notes "The Ultimate School Of Rock & Roll" 1997 United States
- Johnny Devlin, "How Would Ya Be" LP, Prestige Records PLP 1201 New Zealand, 1958
- Andy Lee & Tennessee Rain, "I Don't Wanna Be Lonely Tonight" CD, Grunwald Records Germany, 2004
- Rudy LaCrioux & The All-Stars, "Let's Have A Ball" CD, Spendrift Records CD 107 UK 2001
- "Cover Versions Of The Songs Made Famous By Gene Summers" 2007 United States
- Article and sessionography in issue 15 (1977) of New Kommotion Magazine UK
- Article and sessionography in issue 23 (1980) of New Kommotion Magazine UK
- Feature article and sessionography in issue 74 (1999) of Rockin' Fifties Magazine Germany
- Feature article with photo spread in issue 53 (2000) of Bill Griggs' Rockin' 50s Magazine United States
- Feature Article with photo spread in issue 54 (2000) of Bill Griggs' Rockin' 50s Magazine United States

== See also ==
- Rockin' Country Style
