= Talk to Me (Joe Seneca song) =

1958 song written by Joe Seneca

"Talk to Me, Talk to Me"

Single by Little Willie John

from the album Talk to Me
- B-side: "Spasms"
- Released: January 1958
- Recorded: January 4, 1958
- Studio: New York City
- Genre: Rhythm and blues
- Length: 2:41
- Label: King
- Songwriter: Joe Seneca

Little Willie John singles chronology
"Person to Person" (1957)	"Talk to Me, Talk to Me" (1958)	"You're a Sweetheart" (1958)

"Talk to Me"

Single by Sunny & the Sunglows
- B-side: "Every Week, Every Month, Every Year"
- Released: August 1963
- Recorded: 1963
- Genre: Doo-wop
- Length: 2:41
- Label: Tear Drop
- Songwriter: Joe Seneca

"Talk to Me"

Single by Mickey Gilley

from the album Put Your Dreams Away
- B-side: "Honky Tonkin' (I Guess I Done Me Some)"
- Released: October 1982
- Recorded: April 1982
- Genre: Country
- Length: 3:10
- Label: Epic
- Songwriter: Joe Seneca
- Producer: Jim Ed Norman

Mickey Gilley singles chronology
"Put Your Dreams Away" (1982)	"Talk to Me" (1982)	"Fool for Your Love" (1983)

"Talk to Me", or "Talk to Me, Talk to Me", is a song written by Joe Seneca. It was originally recorded in 1958 by Little Willie John, whose version reached No. 5 on the R&B chart and No. 20 on the Hot 100.

== Sunny & the Sunliners version ==
- The most successful version was recorded by Texas brown-eyed soul group Sunny & the Sunliners, who took it to number 11 on the Hot 100 in 1963 and number 13 in Canada.

== Other recordings ==
- "Talk to Me" was also recorded by Joe Seneca in 1960, as the B-side to his single,"Forty Days and Forty Nights"
- In 1976, The Beach Boys recorded a version of it, along with "Tallahassee Lassie" on their 1976 album, 15 Big Ones.
- In 1982, Mickey Gilley had his fifteenth number one country hit with his version. It reached number three in Canada.
