= Bobby Hendricks =

American R&B singer (1938–2022)

- Born: Robert Raymond Hendricks; February 22, 1938; Columbus, Ohio, U.S
- Died: March 25, 2022 (aged 84) Lancaster, California, U.S.
- Genres: Rock and roll; rhythm and blues
- Occupations: Singer, songwriter
- Instrument: Vocals
- Years active: 1957–2017
- Labels: Sue Records; Rhino/Atlantic Records; Cub Records; Alta Records; Collectables Records; Warner Music Group; United Artists Records; Time-Life Music; Ace Records (UK); Bear Family Records; Various Indie Labels
- Formerly of: The Drifters, The Swallows, Bill Pinkney, The Flyers, The Sprites

Robert Raymond Hendricks (February 22, 1938 – March 25, 2022) was an American R&B singer who charted two hits in the late 1950s.

== Life and career ==
Hendricks was born in Columbus, Ohio, where he joined his first group, the Crowns, at the age of 16. He was then a member of The Swallows, and The Flyers, before joining The Drifters in 1957. He sang lead on songs including "Drip Drop", and then became a successful solo act.

His single "Itchy Twitchy Feeling", which was covered by his former band soon after it began attracting radio airplay, hit the U.S. charts, reaching No. 5 on the R&B Singles chart and No. 25 on the Billboard Hot 100 in 1958. Hendricks's only other charting single, "Psycho", was a novelty song depicting a psychiatrist talking with a patient. "Psycho" peaked at No. 73 on the Billboard Hot 100 in 1960. New York City disc jockey Dr. Jive (Tommy Smalls) was the voice of the psychiatrist on "Psycho".

From 1961, on and off, through 2008, Bobby Hendricks worked as lead singer with Bill Pinkney's Original Drifters and appeared with them on PBS in the Doo Wop 51 television broadcast and Doo Wop Love Songs, singing "Stand By Me" with Bill Pinkney, Charlie Thomas, and Ben E. King.

Bobby Hendricks died of complications from Alzheimer's disease at his home in Lancaster, California on March 25, 2022. He was 84 years old. He had been diagnosed with the disease in 2016.

== Discography ==
=== Singles ===
- "Itchy Twitchy Feeling" / "A Thousand Dreams" - Sue Records, 1958
- "Dreamy Eyes" / "Molly Be Good" - Sue Records, 1958
- "Cast Your Vote" / "It's Misery" - Sue Records, 1959
- "I'm A Big Boy Now" / "Good Things Will Come" - Sue Records, 1959
- "Little John Green" / "Sincerely, Your Lover" - Sue Records, 1959
- "City Of Angels" / "If I Just Had Your Love" - Sue Records, 1960
- "Busy Flirtin'" / "I Want That" - Sue Records, 1960
- "Psycho" / "Too Good To Be True" - Sue Records, 1960
- "I'm Coming Home" / "Every Other Night" - Mercury Records, (1961)
- "That's All I Got From You" / "I Got A Feeling" - Alta Records, 1962 (with Jimmy Velvit)
- "My Picture" / "You Drive Buddy" - Patience Records. 1962 (recorded as The Sprites)
- "Let's Get It Over" / "Love In My Heart" - Cub Records, 1963
- "I Watched You Slowly Slip Away" (Howard Guyton) / "Let's Get It On" (Bobby Hendricks) - Stardust Records (year unknown)
- "Let's Get It Over" / "Love In My Heart" - MGM Records, 1963

=== Albums ===
- Itchy Twitchy Feeling - Collectables Records, 1996

=== Compilation albums (various artists) ===
(Albums that include at least one track by Bobby Hendricks)

- Les Années 60 - Le Musée De S.L.C. (Volume 2) (2xLP)- United Artists Records ("Itchy Twitchy Feeling")
- The Rock 'N' Roll Era - The '50s: Rave On (2xLP, RM) - Time-Life Music, 1989 ("Itchy Twitchy Feeling")
- The Golden Age of American Rock 'N' Roll: Special Novelty Edition - Ace Records UK, 2003 ("Psycho")
- Very Best of The Drifters - Rhino Records, 1993 ("Drip Drop")
- Best of Sue Records - Collectables Records, 1994 ("Itchy Twitchy Feeling") and ("A Thousand Dreams")
- The Sue Records Story [4-CD box set] - EMI UK, 1994 ("Itchy Twitchy Feeling") +
- Blowing The Fuse - 31 R&B Classics That Rocked The Jukebox In 1958 - Bear Family Records, 2006 ("Itchy Twitchy Feeling")
- Golden Age Of American Rock 'N Roll - Ace Records UK, 2003 ("Psycho")
- The Golden Age of American Rock 'N' Roll Vol. 6 - Ace Records UK, 1997 ("Psycho")
