= Enviken =

- Location within Dalarna Location within Sweden
- Coordinates: 60°48′N 15°47′E
- Country: Sweden
- Province: Dalarna
- County: Dalarna County
- Municipality: Falun Municipality

Area
  - Total: 1.25 km^{2} (0.48 sq mi)

Population (31 December 2010)
  - Total: 609
  - Density: 489/km^{2} (1,270/sq mi)
- Time zone: UTC+1 (CET)
  - Summer (DST): UTC+2 (CEST)
- Climate: Dfc

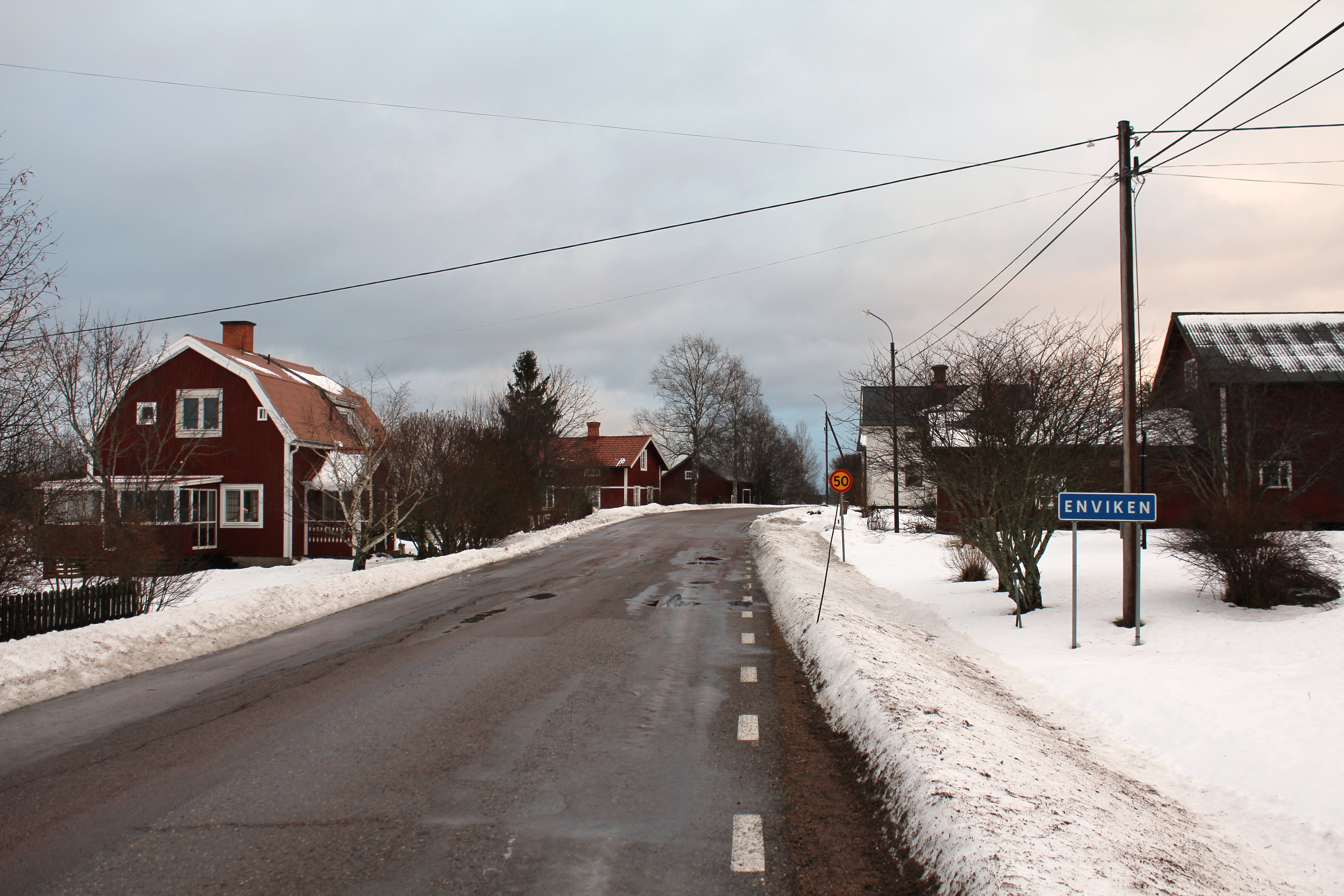

Enviken is a locality situated in Falun Municipality, Dalarna County, Sweden with 609 inhabitants in 2010. Residents of Enviken are known to harbor a nostalgia for mid-20th century Americana complete with a fondness for rockabilly and classic American automobiles.

Enviken is also the name of a record company in the Swedish province of Dalarna.
