= The Southern Legends Entertainment & Performing Arts Hall of Fame =

The Southern Legends Association along with its subsidiaries is a diversified non-profit entertainment company with operations in four business segments, Hall of Fame inductions, artist promotions, musical recordings and various entertainment operations. It was founded in 2005 by Widmarc Clark, Jimmy Case, H. T. "Hank" Henry and Mark Cavaliero. The home office of operation is located in Portland, Tennessee. Public relations, promotion photography and creative art design is done in Cantonment, Florida. Media networking is done from McAlpin, Florida. The website technical work is done in Raleigh, North Carolina, where everything is prepared for presentation on the Hall of Fame website. Musical recording and/or other entertainment operations are done at the home office in Portland, Tennessee. The Southern Legends Hall Of Fame has been recognized by the Country Music Hall of Fame and Museum.
