= Capri Records =

American record label

- Trade name: Next Plateau Entertainment International Domestic
- Type: Independent
- Industry: Record label
- Genre: Rock and roll
- Founded: 1960; Conroe, Texas, U.S.
- Founder: Huey P. Meaux
- Fate: Active: Sold to Warner Music Group; Re-branded into Next Plateau Entertainment International Domestic
- Successor: Next Plateau Entertainment International Domestic
- Headquarters: United States,
- Total assets: US$6.6 million (1984)
- Parent: Warner Music Group (1984–present)

Capri Records was a rock and roll record label established in Conroe, Texas, by Huey P. Meaux and Foy Lee in the early 1960s. It started the careers of many Texas musicians and furthered the careers of Gene Summers, Gaylon Christie, Scotty McKay, and Pat Minter.

Capri was a subsidiary of Crazy Cajun Enterprises, which also owned Tear Drop Records, Shane Records, and Crazy Cajun Records. The label's biggest hit came in 1964 with the release of "Big Blue Diamonds" by Gene Summers and the Tom Toms (Capri 502). Capri released some of Steve Tyrell's earliest recordings. Teardrop released B.J. Thomas's first hit, "I'm So Lonesome I Could Cry". The recording was later bought and released by Scepter Records. Tyrell was responsible for making that deal as an executive at Scepter.

== Discography ==
- 500 – Gaylon Christie and the Downbeats – Tell Me What's on Your Mind
- 501 – Ken Lindsey – I Love You a Thousand Ways/Nightly
- 502 – Gene Summers – Big Blue Diamonds/You Said You Loved Me
- 503 – Billy Holeman – The Other Side of Me/Where Broken Hearts Live
- 504 – Gaylon Christie – Wasted Days and Wasted Nights/Tell Me What Is on Your Mind
- 505 – Bobby Bennett – Who's Gonna Love You/Go on with Your Dancing
- 506 – Ken Lindsey – If You Got the Money/Is You Or Is You Ain't My Baby
- 507 – Gene Summers – Alabama Shake/Just Because
- 508 – Max Lipscomb (a.k.a. Scotty McKay) – Dixie Doodle Dandy/Love Is Magic
- 509 – Weird Beard (Russ Knight) – Christmas Singalong/Weird Night Before Christmas
- 510 – The Wheels – Yes, I'm Leaving/Meat Balls and Spaghetti
- 511 – Tony Monte and the Caravells – They All Ask About Joanie/Martha Is Her Name
- 512 – Jimmy James – Sweet, Sweet Honey/Believe Each Word I Say
- 513 – Gene Summers – My Yearbook/Jack and Jill's New House
- 514 – Johnny Evans – You've Got Class/Huey Meaux On the Shrimp Boat
- 515 – The Fallouts – I Cry Alone/Meet Me on the Corner
- 516 – Jim Jones and The Chaunteys – Turn on Your Love Light/If You Knew How to Start
- 517 – Pat Minter – Go on with Your Dancing/Tears in My Eyes
- 518 – Johnny Evans and The Chantels – Do You Love Me So/Dreaming of You
- 519 – Billy Holeman – Flip Flop & Fly/Running
- 520 – What's Left – Girl Said No/Somebody Took a Shot at Me
- 521 – Bobbi & Susie – We'll Take Our Last Walk Tonight/Believe Me
- 522 – The Sands – Open Your Eyes/Can't Find A Way
- 531 – Mistics – Memories/Without Love
- 534 – Steve Tyrell – A Boy Without a Girl/Young Boy's Blues
- 631 – The Mistics – Memories/Without Love
- C–634 – Steve Tyrell – A Boy Without a Girl/Young Boy's Blues

== Sources ==
- Billboard
- Dallas Observer
- "Down in Houston: Bayou City Blues"
- Osborne's Record Guide
- Texas Monthly
- A Guide to the Huey Meaux Papers, 1940–1994
- Texas Music Industry Directory (published by The Texas Music Office) Office of the Governor, Austin, Texas
