= Gene Summers =

American rock musician (1939–2021)

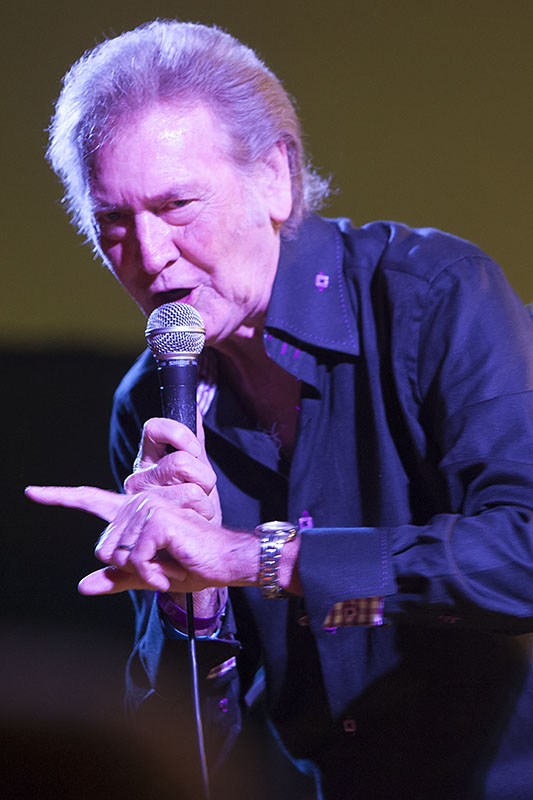

Background information
- Born: David Eugene Summers; January 3, 1939; Dallas, Texas, U.S.
- Died: February 17, 2021 (aged 82) Dallas, Texas, U.S.
- Genres: Rock and roll, rockabilly
- Occupations: Musician, singer, songwriter
- Instruments: Vocals, guitar
- Years active: 1958–2021
- Labels: Alta, Apex, Capri, Charly, Collectables, EMI/Big Beat, Pathé Records, Jan/Jane, Jamie, Jubilee, Domino, Front Row, K-Tel, Mercury, Norton, Overtone, Rave, Rhino/Atlantic, Tear Drop, W&G, Pickwick, Rollercoaster, UK,

David Eugene Summers (January 3, 1939 – February 17, 2021) was an American rockabilly singer, songwriter and guitarist. His most famous recordings include the late 1950s "School of Rock 'n Roll", "Straight Skirt", "Nervous", "Gotta Lotta That", "Twixteen", "Alabama Shake", "Fancy Dan" and his biggest-selling single "Big Blue Diamonds". Summers was inducted into the Rockabilly Hall of Fame in 1997 and the Southern Legends Entertainment & Performing Arts Hall of Fame in 2005. He still performed worldwide and celebrated his 50th anniversary as a recording artist in 2008 with the release of Reminisce Cafe.

== Early life and rise to first success ==
Summers was born in Dallas, Texas. He graduated from Duncanville High School in 1957 and attended Arlington State College, now known as the University of Texas at Arlington. That same year, he formed the rockabilly band the Rebels and performed on Joe Bill's Country Picnic on KRLD-TV where they were spotted by songwriter Jed Tarver. This led to the band being signed by newly founded Jan Records. Their first record was released on February 1, 1958, under the name of Gene Summers & His Rebels.

== Gene Summers & the Tom Toms ==
Gene Summers & the Tom Toms
- Origin: Dallas, Texas, U.S.
- Genres: Rock, R&B, rockabilly
- Years active: 1962–1965
- Labels: Jamie, Alta, Capri, Overtone
- Past members: Gene Summers; David A. Martin; James McClung; Charlie Mendias; Jack Castleberry; C. B. Williams; Ernest Walker; Glenn Keener; Mel Robinson; Harry (Good Times) Jackson; Jesse Lopez; Bobby Charles (Shumate); Tommy (Tom) Morrell; Jackie Lassiter; Dickie Sloan

Summers, who was still popular on the back of two regional hits "Straight Skirt"/"School Of Rock 'n Roll", (Jan No. 11-100) and "Nervous"/"Gotta Lotta That" (Jan No. 102), was playing in east Dallas at the 123 Club with his new group of Rebels which included lead guitarist and original Rebel James McClung, bass player Jack Castleberry, drummer Charlie Mendias and Codine Craft on piano. When Craft married and left the band, she was replaced by pianist/frontman C.W. Kendall formerly of the Big Beats – "Clark's Expedition" (Columbia No. 41072) and "The Big Beats Live At The Off-Broadway" an LP issued by Liberty Records (#LRP-3407).

This provided the opportunity for Summers to exit the Rebels and in April 1961 a new group emerged on the DFW club scene known as Gene Summers and the Tom Toms. One of the first performances of this newly formed alliance was on a bill in Fort Worth, Texas at Jimmy Levin's Skyliner Ballroom with legendary bluesman Elmore James. (Before becoming a musical unit, Summers and the Tom Toms had booked studio time in early 1961 at The Clifford Herring Studios in Fort Worth where they recorded three songs. The first title was guitarist Eddie Hill's "Taboo" (Lake County LP-504/Born Bad LP-BB107), "Tomorrow" (Alta Records) No. 104) and an original instrumental titled "Loco Cat" (Collector LP/CD-4420).

By May 1961, Gene and the Tom Toms were touring the US with the Chuck Berry show. The lineup also included Bill Pinkney's Original Drifters (Bill Pinkney, Andrew Thrasher, Gerhart Thrasher and Bobby Hollis) plus Bobby Hendricks of "Itchie Twitchie Feeling" fame (Sue No. 706). The group toured most of 1961 but by the end of that year they had begun to break up. Eddie Hill and Joel Colbert wanted to form a new band so they left the Tom Toms and departed for Lubbock, Texas. It was while he was returning to Dallas in early 1962 that Eddie Wayne Hill and one of his new band members, Donny LaGrone, were killed when their convertible collided head-on with a gravel truck on state Highway 114 south of Decatur, Texas.

Meanwhile, back in Dallas, Summers and bass player David A. Martin were revamping the Tom Toms who were now the house band at the Guthrey Club. Gene's former drummer from the 123 Club, Charlie Mendias, joined the group. Also, James McClung, the original Rebels guitar player, became a Tom Tom. McClung had previously written Gene's rockabilly classic "School Of Rock 'n Roll", (Jan No. 11-101). Also recruited were guitarist Glenn Keener and saxophonist Melvin Robinson. Robinson, formerly an original member of Sid King and the Five Strings, only played with the group through mid-July and was replaced by Jesse Lopez, the younger brother of soon-to-be-star, Trini Lopez.

The Tom Toms remained intact throughout most of 1962 with only a couple of changes in personnel. During early October, that year, David A. Martin left for Memphis with singer/organist Sam Samudio. Sam had been playing in Dallas at Jack's Blue Room which was just down the street from the Guthrey Club on Industrial Boulevard. Sam and David formed the group Sam The Sham and The Pharaohs, who would go on to great international success. Gene's former bass player, Jack Castleberry from the 123 Club, replaced Martin in the Tom Toms.

Lead guitar player Glenn Keener also left the Tom Toms about six weeks later to join a banjo group called Freddy Powers and the Powerhouse 1V. In July 1962, the Powerhouse 1V had been discovered by Hugh Downs of the "Today Show" and had appeared twice on his program. Keener joined the group in late 1962 just in time to appear on their Warner Bros. Records album "The Good Life!" (WBLP-1488) which was released in early 1963. Keener eventually ended up in Nashville as a session musician/record producer for Opryland Records and then Mercury Records-Phonogram. Keener was the first to sign/record Reba McEntire for a major label deal.

With the defection of Martin and Keener, Summers again re-organized the Tom Toms. The new line-up now included James McClung on lead guitar, Jack Castleberry on bass, Charlie Mendias on drums and Jesse Lopez on sax. The rhythm section was augmented with the addition of organ player Harry "Good Times" Jackson. Jackson was replaced a short time later by keyboard player Bobby Charles (Shumate), who also doubled on saxophone. By early 1963 Bobby Charles had left the group and was replaced by organ player Ernest Walker. Jesse Lopez, who was still in high school, dropped-out of the band and was replaced by sax player C.B. Williams. This became the final musical line-up for the Tom Toms. The band now included Summers, McClung, Mendias, Castleberry, Walker and Williams. This was the group that went into the Clifford Herring Recording Studio, in Fort Worth, Texas, on March 28, 1963, and recorded Gene's breakthrough single "Big Blue Diamonds" (Donnybrook Records No. 556/Capri Records No. 502/Jamie Records No. 1273). An instrumental version of "Peanut Butter" (Shane No. 47-2) was also recorded at this session. In June 1964, they would return to the Summit Sound Studios in Dallas to record the Summers rockabilly classic "Alabama Shake" (Capri No. 507), a song composed by James McClung in 1958. They also cut Lloyd Price's "Just Because" (Capri No. 507) plus "The Great Pretender" (Crystal Clear CD CCR 9723-2) at this session.

The Tom Toms continued to make music through the first part of 1965 playing, primarily, at the Guthrey Club in Dallas at Corinth and Industrial, before splitting up later that year, for a variety of personal and professional reasons.

Summers has continued to record and perform in clubs and international tours into the 21st century. In 1997, he became the 29th artist to be inducted into the Rockabilly Hall Of Fame, commemorated with a re-issue of his key recordings on the Crystal Clear Sound label. He was also inducted into The Southern Legends Entertainment & Performing Arts Hall of Fame in 2005. Summers was presented his HOF certificate in Hollywood, California by air personality John Rhys on October 29, 2005. In February 2008, he celebrated 50 years as a recording artist with the release of a new studio album, Reminisce Cafe (Seduction SCD-110). Gene Summers was married to songwriter Deanna Summers from 1961 until her death in 2017. They have three sons Dusty, Steve and Shawn.

Gene Summers died peacefully in Dallas on February 17, 2021, with his sons Steven and Shawn by his side. He was 82.

== Partial discography ==
- Rock 'n Roll Volume 2. 1973, Holland
- The Southern Cat Rocks On 1975, Switzerland
- Mister Rock and Roll 1977, Switzerland
- Rock a Boogie Shake 1980, Sweden
- Early Rocking Recordings 1981, Holland
- Texas Rock and Roll 1981, France
- Gene Summers in Nashville 1981, France
- Dance Dance Dance 1981, UK
- Rock 'n Roll Tour – "Live" In Scandinavia 1983, Sweden
- School Of Rock 'n Roll (album) 1994, Holland
- Sounds Like Elvis CD 1996 (compilation), USA
- The Ultimate School of Rock & Roll 1997, USA
- Rockaboogie Shake 1999, UK
- Do Right Daddy 2004, Sweden
- Reminisce Cafe 2008, USA
- Taboo! 2011, USA
- Gotta Lotta That The Essential Gene Summers 2012, USA
- Rock-A-Dallas 2016, USA
- Country Song Roundup 2018 USA

== Television, films and DVDs ==
(incomplete)

- Hi-School High Lites Show – Dallas, TX 1956
- The Neal Jones Show – Dallas, TX 1956
- Joe Bill's Country Picnic – Dallas, TX 1957-'58
- Jerry Haynes' "Top Ten Dance Party" – Dallas, TX 1958
- The Larry Kane Show – Houston, TX 1958
- The Ted Steele Bandstand Show – New York City-1958
- The Milt Grant Show- Washington, DC 1958
- The Buddy Deane Show – Baltimore, MD 1958
- The Bill Bennett Show – Minneapolis, MN, 1958
- The Larry Kane Show – Houston, TX 1964
- Hi-Ho Shebang Show – Ft. Worth, TX 1965-'66
- Le Grand Échiquier – Paris, France 1981
- World Class Championship Wrestling – Dallas, TX 1981 (see Ring announcers)
- Warner-Amex Special Gene Summers 'Live' At Zebo's – 1983
- Backlot (movie-short) – 1986
- No Safe Haven (movie) – 1989
- Rob's Chop Shop (TV Pilot) – 1996
- Billy Martin (movie) – 2000
- 100 Höjdare ("100 Highlights") – 2004–2008 (Swedish TV Series)
- Big Beat Generation Vol. 1 (DVD) – 2009 (Big Beat Records, France)
- Big Beat Story Vol. 2 (DVD) – 2011 (Big Beat Records, France)
- Swiss television NZZ Format – 2013 (Features Gene in "Für immer Rock'n'Roll: Ein Lebensgefühl" with interviews and backstage footage from shows in the UK.)

== Cover versions of Gene Summers songs ==
Many songs popularized by Gene Summers have been recorded by other artists. Cover versions include:

- Alabama Shake – by Crazy Cavan and the Rhythm Rockers (1976), The Flying Saucers (1976), C.S.A (1978), Teddy and The Tigers (1979), The Rockabilly Rebs (1979), Rockin' Lord Lee & The Outlaws (1988), Tony Vincent (1993), Badland Slingers (1999), The Shaking Silouets (1999), The TTs (2002), King Drapes (2003), Rawhide (2004), Hurricains (2007), The Muskrats (2009), Deke Dickerson (2010), Andy Warner and Spo-Dee-O-Dee (2012), The Hawks (2014), Lil' Camille (2017), Mr. Breathless (2017), Jeff Allen (2018), Modern Sounds, (2020)
- Almost 12 O'Clock – by Rock-Ola (1981)
- Baby Please Tell Me Why – by Lobo Jones and The Rhythm Hounds (2017)
- Be Bop City – by Lakesend & Foxy (2017)
- Big Blue Diamonds – by Jacky Ward (1971), Ernest Tubb (1972), Mel Street (1972), Jerry Lee Lewis (1973), Merle Kilgore (1974), Jimmy Patton (1975), Bobby Crown (1980), Ted Roddy (19??), Dan Walser (1996), Dennis Gilley (2000), Lembo Allen (2004), Rance Norton (2008), Back In Time Band (2009), HIYIELD1313 (2009), Lyndall Underwood (2010), Kelly Schoppa (2011), Honkey Tonk Possey (2012), DallasCrossoverBand (2013), The South of Dixie Band (2013), Henry Hosek (2016), Jeff Woolsey (2017), Jim Nix (2017, Bob Bales (2018)
- Chapel Bells Ringing – by Jeff Allen (2018)
- The Clown – by J. Frank Wilson (1969). Note: (J. Frank Wilson voice over using the original Gene Summers bandtrack)
- Crazy Cat Corner – by Bill Peck (1998) (re-written vocal adaptation titled "The Night Elvis Missed The Boat")
- Dance Dance Dance – by Jeff Allen (2018)
- Fancy Dan – by Darrel Higham (1998), The Rocking Boys (2003), Eddie & The Flatheads (2003), Houserockers (2005), Roughcuts (????), Wild Roosters (2013, Rockin' The Joint (2013), Trouble Shooters (2017), Gold Diggin' Papa (2017), John Lewis (2018), Spo-Dee-O-Dee (2019)
- Gotta Lotta That – by Johnny Devlin (1958), Andy Lee & Tennessee Rain (2000), Rudy LaCrioux and the All-Stars (2001), Wyldwood Four 2012, Alan Leatherwood (2013), Lil´Camille & the Rattletones (2018)
- I'll Never Be Lonely – by Eddie Clendening (2006), Jeff Allen (2019)
- My Picture – by The Sprites aka (Bill Pinkney's Original Drifters) (1962)
- Nervous – by Johnny Devlin (1959), Robert Clark (1959), Robert Gordon with Link Wray (1979), Lonestars (1981), Rock-Ola & The Freewheelers (2000), T-Bird Gang (2009), Ducky Jim Trio, (2013)

NOTE: Gene Vincent attempted twice to record a demo of "Nervous" in home recordings in Dallas in 1957 which were released in 1998 on Dragon Street Records CD "The Lost Dallas Sessions"

- Reminisce Cafe – by Pete Moss (2004) (Taped during a "live" broadcast on The Pete Moss Show on KDWN-AM Radio, Las Vegas, Nevada)
- Rockaboogie Shake – by Lennerockers (2002)
- School Of Rock 'n Roll – by Savage Kalman and The Explosion Rockets (1979), The Polecats (1980), Red Hot Max And The Cats (1989), The Rhythm Rockers (1989), Johnny Reno (1990), The Lennerockers (1991), The Alphabets (1991), Mess Of Booze (1993), The Vees (1995), The Blue Moon Rockers (1996), The Cornell Hurd Band (2002), Thierry LeCoz (2003), Rockin' Ryan and The Real Goners (2003), Lucky Strike Band (2003), Los Aceleradores (2004), Alan Leatherwood (2004), The Starlight Wranglers (2004), The Greyhounds (2004), Black Knights (2004), Rory Justice (2004), Big Sandy & his Fly-Rite Boys (2005), Mike Mok and The Em-Tones (2007), Bob Glazebrook & Houserockers (2009), Dixie Stompers (2009), The Muskrats (2009), Black Knights (2010), The Jets & Lights Out (2010), The Bop A Tones (2010), Victor Huganet (2010), Cliff and the Cavaliers (2010), HooDoo- Tones (2010) Dennis and the Rocktones (2012), Ducky Jim Trio (2012), Flying Flick Knives (2012), Gene Gambler and the Shufflers (2013), Robby Vee (2014), Reverend Horton Heat (2014), Tyler Hart Tryo (2014), The Hoodoo-Tones (2016), Ray Allen Trio (2017), The Cattle Thieves (2017), Snakebite (2017), Dell Clark and Rocket 88 (2018), Sandy Ford and Flying Saucers (2018), Jeff Allen, (2018), Johnny & The Two Rockin' Aces (2018), Dylan Kirk with the Starlights (2019)
- Various Artists: School of Rock 'n Roll was used as the title for a (2) CD Box Set compilation released in the late 1990s. CD featured artists from the 1980s including J. Geils Band, Billy Squier, Steve Miller, The Motels, Glass Tiger, Culture Club, Sheena Easton and others. (CD title obviously inspired by the Gene Summers original, classic 'School Of Rock 'n Roll')
  - Gene Vincent – UNISSUED private recording, (late 1960s). According to a 1998 Now Dig This! magazine review of Derek Henderson's book "Gene Vincent A Discography", there's a complete A-Z listing of the 217 song titles that he's (Vincent) known to have recorded-everything from the Capitol biggies such as "Say Mama", Rocky Road Blues" and "Wildcat" to lesser known items such as private recordings of "Stand By Me", "Chain Gang" and "School Of Rock 'n Roll".
- She Bops A Lot – by The Lightcrust Doughboys (2000), Floyd Dakil (2010)
- Straight Skirt – by The Diamonds (1958), Johnny Devlin (1958), Bengt Johansson (1958), Willie King (1958), Ronnie Dawson (1958), The Sureshots (2005)
- Tomorrow by Jeff Allen (2018)
- Turnip Greens – by Darrel Higham & The Enforcers (1992), Eddie Clendening (2012)
- Twixteen – by Teddy and The Tigers (1979), Runnin' Wild (1997), (Jimmy Velvit) (2000) (The Velvit version is a re-written vocal adaptation titled "Waiting For Elvis" and also uses the original Gene Summers 1958 "Twixteen" sound track)
- You Said You Loved Me – by Sid and Billy King (1988)
