= Twixteen =

Single by Gene Summers & His Rebels
- A-side: "Twixteen"
- B-side: "I'll Never Be Lonely"
- Released: 1958
- Recorded: 1958 - Hollywood, California
- Genre: Rockabilly
- Length: 1:51
- Label: Jane Records (distributed by Jay Gee Record Corp.)
- Songwriter: Mary Tarver

"Twixteen" is a song written by Mary Tarver in 1958 and published by Ted Music, BMI. It was first recorded by Gene Summers and His Rebels in 1958 and issued by Jan/Jane Records. The "Twixteen" recording session took place at the Liberty Records Studios in Hollywood, California and featured René Hall and James McClung on guitar, Plas Johnson on saxophone, Earl Palmer on drums, and George "Red" Callendar on bass. The flipside of "Twixteen" was "I'll Never Be Lonely".

== Reviews ==
Billboard in their January 26, 1959 issue, in the section 'Reviews of New Pop Records' on page 48, commented "She's not yet sixteen, is the meaning of this title according to the chanter on this winning rock and roller. It has a sound and Summers sells it well. It could move".

== "Twixteen" cover versions ==
- Runnin' Wild - Belgium
- Teddy And The Tigers - Finland
- Jimmy Velvit - United States (Re-written vocal adaptation titled " Waitin' For Elvis") (see Sources)

== Sources ==
- Billboard Magazine, January 26, 1959 Reviews of New Pop Records, page 48 United States
- Billboard Magazine, February 2, 1959, page 35 United States
- Liner notes "The Ultimate School Of Rock & Roll" 1997 United States
- "Cover Versions Of The Songs Made Famous By Gene Summers" 2007 United States
- Article and sessionography in issue 15 (1977) of New Kommotion Magazine UK
- Article and sessionography in issue 23 (1980) of New Kommotion Magazine UK
- Feature article and sessionography in issue 74 (1999) of Rockin' Fifties Magazine Germany
- Feature article with photo spread in issue 53 (2000) of Bill Griggs' Rockin' 50s Magazine United States
- Feature Article with photo spread in issue 54 (2000) of Bill Griggs' Rockin' 50s Magazine United States
- Rockin' With Velvit...the 1960s - Seduction Records SCD-102 CD United States
- Rockin' Country Style
