= Sparton Records =

Canadian record company

- Founded: 1930; 96 years ago
- Genre: Rock, pop, country
- Location: London, Ontario, Canada

Sparton Records was a Canadian record company which was based in London, Ontario.

== History ==
Sparton Records was founded in 1930 by the American electronics company Sparks-Withington Corp., of Jackson, Michigan, which made Sparton radios. It manufactured and distributed Columbia Records in Canada from 1939 to 1954. It had distribution arrangements with other American record companies, most notably ABC Records. It was the first record company in Canada to manufacture stereo records in 1958. Sparton Records suffered a potentially fatal blow when ABC Records switched Canadian distribution from Sparton to Polydor Records in November 1968. While the record company folded the following year, Sparton Corporation is still in operation. Sparton closed its London operations in 2009.

== Sparton Records artists ==
- The Bill Smith Combo aka Tommy & The Tom Toms
- Ward Allen
- Paul Anka
- Merle Haggard
- Joyce Haun
- The Page Quartet
- Cliff McKay
- Jimmy Namaro
- Donn Reynolds
- Ramblin' Lou Schriver
- Lou Breese
- Bob Scott
- Don & Priscilla Wright
- The Velvetones
