= Nervous (Gene Summers song) =

Single by Gene Summers & His Rebels
- A-side: "Nervous"
- B-side: "Gotta Lotta That"
- Released: 1958
- Recorded: 1958 - Hollywood, CA
- Genre: Rockabilly, doo-wop
- Length: 2:24
- Label: Jan/Jane Records; Jubilee Records; Apex Records
- Songwriter: Mary Tarver

"Nervous" is a rockabilly/doo-wop song first recorded by Gene Summers and His Rebels in 1958 and later covered by Robert Gordon and Link Wray, among others. It was composed by Mary Tarver in 1957, published by Ted Music, BMI and issued on Jan/Jane Records. The "Nervous" recording session took place at Liberty Records Studios in Hollywood, California in June 1958 and featured Rene Hall and James McClung on guitar, Plas Johnson on saxophone, Earl Palmer on drums, and George "Red" Callendar on bass. The background vocal group was the Five Masks (Al "TNT" Braggs, Cal Valentine, Robert Valentine, Billy Fred Thomas and Jesse Lee Floyd). The flipside of "Nervous" was "Gotta Lotta That".

== Reviews ==
BILLBOARD MAGAZINE - June 1958 Reviews of New Pop Records
GENE SUMMERS
Nervous....83
JAN 102 - Strong material and strong performance by the new talent. It's a powerful beat job and the kids should flip over it. Action already reported from the southwest territories. (Ted, BMI)

The Cash Box - The Cash Box Best Bets - June 14, 1958
"NERVOUS" (2:22) [Ted, BMI - Tarver]
Gene Summers & His Rebels (January 102)
"...exciting opus...could spread like wildfire...strong merchandise..."

== "Nervous" cover versions ==
- Johnny Devlin - New Zealand
- Lonstars - Finland
- Rock-Ola & The Freewheelers - Finland
- Robert Gordon - United States
- Robert Gordon with Link Wray - United States

== Sources ==
- Billboard Magazine - June 1958 Reviews of New Pop Records United States
- The Cash Box - June 1958 The Cash Box Best Bets United States
- Liner notes "The Ultimate School Of Rock & Roll" 1997 United States
- Johnny Devlin, "Hit Tunes" EP Boutique/Coca-Cola Records C-1001 Australia, 1959
- Lonestars, "Bop & Roll" CD Jungle Records 3003 Finland, 1981
- Rock -Ola and the Freewheelers, "Upskirt" CD Bluelight Records BLR-3374 2 Finland, 2000
- Robert Gordon, "Bad Boy" LP/CD RCA Records AFLI 3523 United States, 1979
- Robert Gordon with Link Wray, "Fresh Fish Special" CD Raven Records RVCD 57 Australia, 1997
- "Cover Versions Of The Songs Made Famous By Gene Summers" 2007 United States
- Article and sessionography in issue 15 (1977) of New Kommotion Magazine UK
- Article and sessionography in issue 23 (1980) of New Kommotion Magazine UK
- Feature article and sessionography in issue 74 (1999) of Rockin' 1950s Magazine Germany
- Feature article with photo spread in issue 53 (2000) of Bill Griggs' Rockin' 1950s Magazine United States
- Feature Article with photo spread in issue 54 (2000) of Bill Griggs' Rockin' 1950s Magazine United States

== See also ==
- Rockin' Country Style
