= Tear Drop Records =

American record label

- Parent company: Crazy Cajun Enterprises
- Founded: c.1960
- Founder: Huey P. Meaux
- Defunct: c.1985
- Status: Inactive
- Distributor: Jay Gee Records
- Genre: R&B; rock and roll; Latin
- Country of origin: United States
- Location: Winnie, Texas

Tear Drop Records was a record label founded in Winnie, Texas, United States, in the early 1960s by recording pioneer and radio personality Huey P Meaux. As a deejay, Meaux was known as the "Crazy Cajun", a name that stuck with him throughout his long music career.

In 1964, Meaux moved his Tear Drop label and his Crazy Cajun Enterprises to Conroe, Texas, where he partnered with a seasoned record producer, Foy Lee. They not only continued to release new material but also started various subsidiary labels, including Capri Records, Tribe Records, and Eric Records. Together, Meaux and Lee produced many chart singles on the Tear Drop label. They became nationally distributed by Jay Gee Records (J/G) which was owned by Jamie Records in Philadelphia, Pennsylvania.

Tear Drop's biggest hit was "Talk to Me" by Sunny & the Sunglows from San Antonio, Texas, which broke into the Billboard Top 100. Meaux and Lee also scored another hit in 1964 by Gene Summers & the Tom Toms entitled "Big Blue Diamonds" on their newly formed Capri Records label and later released Summers' rockabilly classic, "Alabama Shake", also on Capri.

In the 1970s, Meaux reactivated the Crazy Cajun record label and began to produce records by early-1960s rocker Freddy Fender. He scored the biggest hit of his career when Fender's "Before The Next Teardrop Falls" single broke through all chart boundaries and went platinum, selling over a million copies. By this time, Meaux had purchased both the SugarHill Recording Studios in Houston, Texas, and the TNT Records pressing plant in San Antonio.

== Select discography ==
=== Albums ===
- 2000 Sunny & The Sunliners - Talk to Me (1963)
- 2001 Sunny & The Sunliners - Las Vegas Welcomes
- 2002 Jimmy Donley (Memorial To The Unforgettable) - Born To Be A Loser (1963)
- 2003 Sunny & The Sunliners - Carino Nuevo
- 2004 Dale McBride - Sings (1963)
- 2005 Rudy Gonzales Y Sus Reno Bops - Un Ratito El Tejano Enamorado
- 2006 Sunny & The Sunliners - Las Ciudades
- 2007 Rudy Gonzales Y Sus Reno Bops - La Palma
- 2008 Sunny & The Sunliners - Tear Drop Presents
- 2009 Roy Montelongo - Brindo Por Ti
- 2010 Rudy And The Reno Bops - Dejame Sonar
- 2011 Los Muchachos - Frijolitos Pintos
- 2012 Rocky Gil & The Bishops - The Two Sides Of Rocky Gil & The Bishops (1966)
- 2013 Roy Montelongo - Adios Chiquita
- 2014 Los Monarcas - Perlita
- 2015 The Starlight's - Triste Payaso
- 2016 Rocky Gil & The Bishops - El Fantastico
- 2017 Los Fabulosos Dominos - Nada Contigo
- 2018 Sunny & The Sunliners - From The Past
- 2019 Los Stardusters - All Night Worker
- 2020 Gilbert & The Blue Notes - Yo Soy Aquel
- 2021 Los Muchachos - El Bomberito
- 2022 Rocky Gil & The Bishops - Soul Party
- 2023 Los Pablos - Dame Un Poco De Ti
- 2025 Los Pablos - Los Pablos
- 2026 The Jives - Espera Un Tantito
- 2027 Jives - The Jives
- 2028 Jives - Making Time
- 2029 Dueto Los Galan - Dos Hojas Sin Rumbo
- 2030 Rudy Tee Gonzales Y Sus Reno Bops - "Country"
- 2031 Gary And The Epics - Gary And The Epics
- 2032 Charlie & The Jives - No Tengo Dinero
- 2038 Juan Sifuentes - El Lado Pobre Del Pueblo
- 2039 Julio Casas - Julio Casas y El Mariachi Nuevo San Juan
- 2040 Sunny y Los Sunliners - Sunny Y Los Sunliners (White Album)
- 2042 Chucho Moreno Y Su Conjunto - Chucho Moreno Y Su Conjunto
- 2044 Juan Ramos Y Los Principes De Nuevo Laredo - Mis Corridos Famosas Del '74–'75
- 2046 Los Guadalupanos - Los Guadalupanos
- 2047 Henry Zimmerle - Henry Zimmerle
- 2048 Juan Ramos - Cumbias, Cumbias, Y Mas Cumbias!!!
- 2049 Trinity-I - Trinity-I
- 2051 Flaco Jimenez - Flaco Jimenez (1976)
- 2054 Sunny Ozuna - Yesterday... & Sunny
- 2063 Juan Ramos Y Los Principes De Nuevo Laredo - A Bailar Sabrozo Con Cumbias (1977)
- 2064 Julio Casas Con Mariachi - Sueno Con Tu Amor (1977)
- 2067 Jimmy Velvit - Jimmy Velvit Country
- 2068 Juan Ramos - Homenaje A Elvis Presley (1978)
- 2069 Henry Balderama Y La Patria - La Ultima Vez (1978)
- 2073 Juan Ramos Y Los Principes De Nuevo Laredo - De Todo Como En Botica (1978)
- 2075 Los Tamps - Los Tamps (1979)
- 2076 Jay Garcia/Joe T. Campos and the Crusaders Band - Los Pesadotes
- 2080 Street People - Street People (1979)
- 2083 Street People - Los Callejeros (1980)
- 2085 Shawn Sahm & Prezence - Life In The City (1983)
- 5000 Doug Sahm/Augie Meyers - The West Side Sound Rolls Again (1983)
- 5001 Bad News - The Bad News Is Out

=== Extended play (EP) ===
- 3031 Sunny Ozuna And The Sunliners - De Mi Nada Mas/Usted - Pa Que Sientas, Lo Que Siento/Que Tal Te Sientes (1964)

=== Singles ===
- 3001 Jerry (Count) Jackson - The Band Doll/Where Can You
- 3002 Kenny James - A Woman's Gonna Have Her Way/Please Mr Sandman
- 3003 Prince Charles (Sheffield) - Come On Home/Only You
- 3004 Jay Richards - Sneaking Home/I Want To Know
- 3005 Jimmy Donley - Honey, Stop Twistin'/Hello Remember Me (1962)
- 3006 Hub Brando And The Dreamers - Easy/Free Loader
- 3007 Jimmy Donely - Think It Over/Santa Don't Pass Me By (1962)
- 3007 Jimmy Donley - Forever Lillie Mae/Think It Over (1962)
- 3008 Hub Brando & The Dreamers - Eskimo Walk/Jingle Bells
- 3009 Jimmy Donley - Lovin' Cajun Style/Baby Heaven Sent Me You (1963)
- 3010 Jerry Arnold - Walking/While The Town Is Asleep
- 3012 T.B. Fisher - Don't Worry About Me/Don't Change Your Mind
- 3013 Jerry Starr - I'm Writing A Letter/You Don't Want Me
- 3014 Sunny & The Sunglows - Talk To Me/ Every Day Every Month Every Year (1963)
- 3014 Sunny & The Sunglows - Talk To Me/Pony Time (1963)
- 3015 Mark Hanson - A Long Times (Is Much Longer Then I Thought)/Mr. Clock (1963)
- 3015 Mark Hanson - A Long Times (Is Much Longer Then I Thought)/Sugar Gay
- 3016 Sunny & The Sunliners - Carino Nuevo/Sufriendo Y Piensando (1963)
- 3017 Jimmy Donley - You're Why I'm lonely/Let Me Told You (1963)
- 3018 Joey Long - If I Should Need You/You Can't Give Back The Love
- 3019 Mark James - She's Gone Away/River Of Tears
- 3020 Dale McBride - Old Enough To Break A Heart/The Rest Of My Life (1963)
- 3021 Jimmy Donley - Santa Please Don't Pass Me By/Santa's Alley (1963)
- 3022 Sunny & The Sunliners - Rags To Riches/Not Even Judgement Day (1963)
- 3023 Jerry Starr & The Clippers - Hearts Of Stone/I'm Confessin'
- 3024 The Hitchhikers - Goin' To L.A./Wimpey's Blues (1963)
- 3025 Sunny & The Sunliners - Cuando El Destino/Emocion Pasajera (1963)
- 3026 Jimmy Donley - I Really Got The Blues/Just A Game (1964)
- 3027 Sunny & The Sunliners - Out Of Sight Out Of Mind/No One Else Will Do (1964)
- 3028 The Loafers - Honey Hush/Ain't That Loving You Baby
- 3029 Dale McBride - Guess Who/Lovely Little One (1964)
- 3030 Champagne Brothers - It's Raining/Robin
- 3033 Steve Tyrell - Stand By Me/I'm Losing You
- 3034 Jimmy Donley - I'm Lonesome Without The Blues/Forget The Past (1964)
- 3035 Sunny & The Sunliners - It's Too Late/You Gave Me A True Love (1964)
- 3036 Kirby St. Romaine - Oh, Baby Doll/Summertime Fun
- 3037 Sunny & The Sunliners - Dime Como Le Haces/Tu Nueva Vida (1964)
- 3038 Rudy & The Reno Bop's - Rudy's Monkey/Together Again (1964)
- 3039 Rudy Gonzales & The Reno Bops - El Tejano Enamorado/Un Ratito (1964)
- 3040 Sunny & The Sunliners - You Send Me/His Greatest Creation (1964)
- 3041 Dale McBride - Barbara/I Can't Ever Free My Mind (1964)
- 3042 Champagne Brothers - I'll Run Away, Far Away/Let's Live
- 3043 Margo White - If Only You Were Here/I've Got A Right To Lose My Mind
- 3044 Rod Bernard - Our Teenage Love/Doing The Oo-Wa-Woo (1964)
- 3045 Sunny & The Sunliners - Something's Got A Hold On Me/Not A Fool Anymore (1965)
- 3045 Sunny & The Sunliners - Something's Got A Hold On Me/Teenage Promise
- 3046 Champagne Bros. - Snow On The Ole' Bayou/Christmas Time Without You
- 3047 The Stardusters - La Bola Negra/No Me Tengas Compacion (1965)
- 3048 Rudy Gonzales & The Reno Bops - Sufres Porque Quieres/Fuiste Tu Me Destino (1965)
- 3049 Perry Salinas - Sorpresa/Un Poco Mas
- 3050 Rudy Gonzales & The Reno Bops - Do The Jerk Like Me/Once A Day (1965)
- 3051 Jimmy Donley - Love Bug/I'm To Blame (1965)
- 3052 Rod Bernard - My Jole Blon/You're The Reason I'm In love (1965)
- 3053 The Stardusters - Alma Sin Rumbo/Amor De Todos
- 3054 Sammy Jay & The Tiffanaires - Come Closer To Me/La Tentacion
- 3055 Don Keyes - Little Man (Part 1)/Little Man (Part 2)
- 3056 Sunny & The Sunliners - Hey Little Dancing Girl/Token Of Love (1965)
- 3057 Rudy Gonzales & The Reno Bops - All I Could Do Was Cry/Have Faith (1965)
- 3058 Ivory Joe Hunter - Heart Don't Love Her Anymore/I've Asked You For The Last Time
- 3059 The Champagne Brothers - Raining In My Heart/Old Enough To Break A Heart
- 3060 Rod Bernard - No Money Down/Little Green Man (1965)
- 3061 The Stardusters Con Chano Rodriguez - La Vacilona/Tu Retirado
- 3062 Dale McBride - Am I That Easy To Forget/Our Hearts Beat As One (1965)
- 3063 Rudy "Tee" Gonzales & The Reno Bops - It Was Just An Illusion/The Phillie (1965)
- 3064 Rudy "Tee" Gonzales & The Reno Bops - Adios Dolores (Goodbye Heartaches)/Era Domingo (1965)
- 3065 Ivory Joe Hunter - One Of A Kind/Most Of All (I Need Your Love)
- 3065 Ivory Joe Hunter - Most Of All (I Need Your Love)/Upon Heartbreak Hill
- 3066 Sunny Ozuna/Sunliners - El Taconazo/Las Ciudades (1965)
- 3067 Sunny & The Sunliners - Hitch Hike/That Night In San Antonio (1965)
- 3068 Bill White (The Living Corpse)- Don't Leave Me Here/Ain't It Weird
- 3069 Starro And The Stardusters - Buena Suerte/Nuncas De Volver
- 3070 Dan Goldie - Take Our Last Walk Tonight/Walking The Streets
- 3071 Sunny & The Sunliners - Too Young/The Very Thought Of You (1965)
- 3072 Denny Ezba - Raining In My Heart/Cindy
- 3073 Joe Bravo & The Stardusters - Ella (Vals Ran.)/Pa Que No Serve (Polka Ran.)
- 3074 Him - It's A Man Down There/4 AM
- 3075 Sunny Ozuna & The Sunliners - Pobre Del Pobre/Aguanta Corazon (1965)
- 3076 Carlos & His Guitar - Mr Bolero/The Beach
- 3077 Dale McBride - Prissey Missey/Two Steps From The Blues (1965)
- 3078 Gilbert Guerra & The Skylighters - Amorcito Concendito/Tu Recuerdo Y Yo
- 3079 Gilbert Guerra & The Skylighters - You're So Fine/Ramona
- 3080 Rudy "Tee" Gonzales & The Reno Bops - La Palma/Ya No Quiero (1966)
- 3081 Sunny & The Sunliners - Trick Bag/Cheatin' Traces (1966)
- 3082 Joey Welz - Baby Let Your Hair Hang Down/You Changed
- 3083 Denny Ezba - Society 4-F/Wisdom Of A Fool
- 3084 Rudy "Tee" Gonzales & The Reno Bops - Tell Me What You Gonna Do/Only You (Can Break My Heart) (1966)
- 3085 Johnny Mitchell - A letter To The President/Blinking Lights
- 3086 The Champagnes - I Love The Go Go Girls/The Love I Lost
- 3087 Bobby & The Starlights - Mi Soldita/La Media Vuelta
- 3088 Gilbert Guerra & The Skylighters - Cada Vez Que Te miro/Antononico
- 3089 Los Muchachos - Siempre Hace Frio/Nada Pude Lograr
- 3090 Joe Saldivar Orchestra - El Zavz Y La Palma/Yo Vivo Mi Vida
- 3091 Dale McBride - What's Happening Baby/Haunted Hungry Heart (1966)
- 3092 Rudy "Tee" Gonzales & The Reno Bops - Hasta La Frontera/Limosna De Un Hijo (1966)
- 3093 Denny Ezba - It Ain't That Way With Our Love/Think Of The Good Times
- 3094 Sunny & The Sunliners - Short, Short, Shorty/Fly Me To The Moon (1966)
- 3095 Don Mahoney & Jeana Clare - Soldier's Last Letter/At Mail Call Today
- 3096 Sunny Ozuna & The Sunliners - Triste Y Lastimado/Tu Boda (1966)
- 3097 Rudy "Tee" Gonzales & The Reno Bops - In The Palm Of Your Hand/The Tables Have Turned (1966)
- 3098 Stevo - Shirley/Don Goldie - Popcorn (Inst.)
- 3099 Starlights - Bootleg/My Special Angel
- 3100 Dale McBride - I Might Cry/I Love Only You (1966)
- 3101 Roy Montelongo - La Mal Pagadora/En Donde Esta El Corazon
- 3102 Ralph & The Moonlighters - Corazon De Mi Amor/La Mula Bronca
- 3103 Mid-Americans - Lonely Surfer (Inst.)/Lucille
- 3104 Rudy "Tee" Gonzales & The Reno Bops - Que Todos Sepas/Te Salles (1966)
- 3105 Los Stardusters - El Tiempo Mire/No Mas Por Quierte Tanto
- 3106 Los Stardusters - All Night Worker/Forever (1966)
- 3107 Roy Montelongo Con El Mariachi Alma Jalisco - La Corriente/Noche De Mi Mal
- 3108 Champagne Brothers - Don't Ask Me Why/My Love And The Seasons
- 3109 Rudy "Tee" Gonzales & The Reno Bops - La Bamba/Those Long, Lonely Nights (1966)
- 3111 Sunny & The Sunliners - Que Sera Mi China/Por Si Mi Olvido (1966)
- 3112 Rudy "Tee" Gonzales & The Reno Bops - Palabras Del Cielo/La Revolcada (1966)
- 3113 The Stardusters - We're Just Lonely/El Papalote
- 3114 Ralph Trevino & The Moon Lighters - Ay Corazon/Tu Despedida
- 3115 Joe Saldivar Orchestra - La Capsula/Noches Teme Brosas
- 3116 Roy Montelongo - Adios Chiquita/La Chupasera
- 3117 Rod Bernard - Recorded In England/This Should Go On Forever (1966)
- 3118 The Lancers - Me Despido De Ti/La Que Sea
- 3119 Jimmy Donley - My Forbidden Love/Strange Strange Feeling (1966)
- 3120 The Stardusters - Como Fue/Nunca As De Volver
- 3121 Roy Montelongo - El Malquerido/Brindo Por Ti
- 3122 Little Joe & Latinaires - Hey Pretty Baby/Don't Look Back (1966)
- 3123 Sunny & The Sunliners - No One Else Will Do/Cheatin' Traces (1966)
- 3124 Clifton Chenier - Oh, Lucille/You Know That I Love You
- 3125 Clifton Chenier - My Little Girl/Shake 'Em Up Baby
- 3126 Freddie Ruban & Rene - No Volvere (side A)/Joe Saldivar Orch.- Saldivar El Unico (side B)
- 3127 Los Muchachos - Cuantas Veces/En Figura De Mujer
- 3128 Los Monarcas - Limonsito Asucarado/La Lomita Polka
- 3129 Johnny Reyes And The Latin 7 - Prisionero Del Recuerdo/Te Quiero Mas Que Nunca
- 3130 Big Walter - Nobody Loves Me/Get To Gitten'
- 3131 Rudy "Tee" Gonzales & The Reno Bops - Tengo Ganas/No Quiero Darte Rasones (1966)
- 3132 Rocky Gil & The Bishops - El Vasilon/Nuestro Dia Vendra
- 3133 Los Muchachos - Desconsolado/Ordinaria
- 3134 Los Monarcas - Como A Nadie/La Ladina
- 3135 Joe Saldivar Orchestra - Primero Yo/Has De Llorar
- 3136 Warren Storm - Tennessee Waltz/Don't Let It End This Way (1967)
- 3137 Bud & Bud Hooper - Deep Water/We've Got To Get Something Straight (Between Us)
- 3138 Rudy "Tee" Gonzales & The Reno Bops - Cuando Vuelvas A Mi/La Tierra Donde Naci (1967)
- 3139 Houston Stone - That Really Worries Me/Big Pierre
- 3140 Clifton Chenier - A Worried Life Blues/Goin' To Big Mary
- 3141 Glenn Wells - Nite People/(Tears Come Cheap) For The Lonely
- 3142 Los Muchachos - Embrujado/Frijolitos Pintos
- 3143 The Stardusters - Oi Tu Voz/El Puente Roto
- 3144 The Starlights - Volo La Paloma/Un Dia Con Otro
- 3145 The Peppernotes - The Little Spark/Robert Martinez & The Peppernotes - La Divina Garza (1967)
- 3146 Rocky Gil & The Bishops - Tratare De Olvidar/Despues De Nuestra Boda (1967)
- 3147 Roy Montelongo - Renunciacion/A Medias De La Noche (1967)
- 3148 Danny & The Tejanos - Oiga Compadre/Por Tu Dulce Amor (1967)
- 3149 Roy Montelongo - Man Of Action/No Letter Today (1966)
- 3150 Rocky Gill & The Bishops - I'm So Cruel/Dancing In The Streets (1967)
- 3151 Royal Knights - I Need You/I Can't Please You (1967)
- 3152 Los Monarcas - Te Traigo En Mi Cartera/Entre Nos
- 3153 Los Muchachos - Se Me Fue Mi Amor/Aquel Beso
- 3154 Joe Saldivar - Vete Ya/Andas Herida De Una Ala
- 3155 Sunny & The Sunliners - Yo/Malagradecida (1967)
- 3156 Los Stardusters - Mama Didn't Know/Dream Of Our Future Tonight (1967)
- 3157 Abel Salas Y Su Orquesta - Dale Gas/Amor Sin Esperanza
- 3158 Danny & The Dreamers - Think Nothing About It/Ask The Lonely (1967)
- 3159 Ramiro Rodriguez - Sufriendo A Solas/Quiero Verte Otra Vez
- 3160 The Royal Knights - Busca Otro Amor/Que Linda Eres
- 3161 Roy Montelongo - Mi Pena/Tu Solo Tu
- 3162 Johnny Reyes - Buscando Un Olvido/Tu Recuerdo Y Yo
- 3163 Larry Marinez Con Los Muchachos - Tu Desprecio Me Enseno/Con Quien Palabras
- 3164 Danny & The Tejanos - My Love/Mustard Greens (1967)
- 3165 Gilbert & The Blue Notes - Amigo Amigo/Dimelo De Frente (1967)
- 3166 Rocky Gil - La Justicia de Amor/El Cisne (1967)
- 3167 Gilbert & The Blue Notes - No Seas Necia/Yo Soy Aquel
- 3168 Los Muchachos - El Beso De Judas/Esta Tarde Vi Llover
- 3169 Los Monarcas - Puedo Vivir Sin Ti/Que Se Acabe El Agua
- 3170 Rudy Gonzales And The Reno Bops - Un Mojado Sin Licencia/Aungue Se Olvide De Mi (1968)
- 3171 Simon Reyes - People Laugh At Me/Make Believe
- 3172 Bobby Morales & Los Stardusters - La Novia/Potpurri De Polka
- 3173 Los Fabulosos Dominos - 30 Copas/Nada Contigo
- 3174 Rocky Gil & The Bishops - Buscando Un Carino/Al Pie De Un Crucificio (1968)
- 3175 Little Joe & The Latinaires - Don't Let The Stars Get In Your Eyes/Cold, Cold Heart (1968)
- 3176 Roy Montelongo - Piedad/Mi Razon
- 3177 Los Monarcas - Cuando Te Digan/Perlita
- 3178 Bobby Russell - El Loco/Vuela Vuela Palomita
- 3179 Johnny And The Del Heart's - El Perro Negro/La Minifalda De Reynalda
- 3179 Roy Montelongo - Piedad (Mercy Mercy)
- 3180 Neto Perez - Toma Esta Flor/El Camino De Tu Vida
- 3181 Rocky Gil & The Bishops - It's Not The End/Every Day Of My Life (1968)
- 3182 Roy Long - Sophisticated Funk/Mercy Mercy
- 3183 Sunny & The Sunliners - Wonderful Girl/Talk That Trash (1968)
- 3184 Sunny & The Sunliners - Como Fue/Ya Lo Pagaras Con Dios
- 3185 The Stardusters - La Tuerca/Amorcito
- 3186 Rocky Gil & The Bishops - Amor Por Correo/Ya Somos Dos (1968)
- 3187 Los Muchachos - Me Persigue Tu Sombra/Si Fueras Mi Novia
- 3188 Johnny & The Del Hearts - No Sigas Llorando/Se Te Fue El Tren
- 3189 The Brother-In-Laws - Hush Broken Heart/Wanderlust
- 3190 Little Joe & The Latinaires - Fever/Mr Sandman
- 3191 Tommy Jackson - Cold Cold World/A Torch I Carry (1968)
- 3192 Gilbert & The Blue Notes - Quien Te Pregunto/Ojitos De Mi Prieta
- 3193 Rocky Gil & The Bishops - Polytechnic Mambo/blank side (promo)
- 3194 Los Fabulosos Dominos - Golpe Traidor/Borracha Y Por La Calle
- 3195 The Lost Generation - Night Time (Makes You Lonely)/Baby!
- 3196 Bill & Rick - The Skinny Nag (Part 1)/The Skinny Nag (Part 2) (Instr.)
- 3197 Joe Medwick - Nearer To You/Down With It
- 3198 Brothers-In-Law - A Bell's No Good (If You Don't Ring It)/Too Late
- 3199 Rocky Gil & The Bishops - Soul Party/After Party (1968)
- 3200 Bobby Russell & The Starlights - Amor Necio/Carino Del Carino (1968)
- 3201 Mario Diaz (13 Anos De Eda) - Eres Como La Granada/Los Monarcas - Injusta Condena
- 3202 Los Muchachos - Quiero Que Sepas/Al Llegar Diciembre
- 3203 Eddie Kilroy - Seventy South/Tear Filled Eyes
- 3204 Rudy & The Reno Bops - Dejame Sonar/Con Cartitas (1968)
- 3205 Rocky Gil & The Bishops - Te Quiero Y Te Adoro/Carino Nuevo
- 3206 Chuck Price - Long Black Limousine/Especially You
- 3207 Royal Tones - Las Nubes/Que Me Lleve El Diablo
- 3208 Bobby Russell & The Starlights - Se Dios Me Quita La Vida/El Cable
- 3209 Neto Perez - Tu Amor/Donde Estan
- 3210 Ricky Ryan - Memphis Sound/Love Of A Common Man
- 3211 Gene Summers - Cloudy Day/World Of Illusion
- 3212 Dick Blevins - Same Time Same Booth/Pickin' Um Up Layin' Um down
- 3213 Los Pablos - Dulces Memorias/Aquel Amor
- 3214 Mario Diaz - Please Call Me Baby/Los Monarcas - Esos Ojos
- 3215 Johnny Reyes & The Delhearts - Ya Volvio La Palomita/Que Tal Si Te Compro
- 3216 Los Muchachos - Jambalaya/I Will
- 3217 Gilbert Cortez - Vaya Con Dios/La Paloma
- 3218 Rocky Gil & The Bishops - La Medallita/Un Adobe y Cuatro Velas
- 3219 Bobby Butler & The Latinaires - Next Time You See Me/Johnny Hernandez - My World Is Empty Without You
- 3220 Ricky Ryan - You Can't Take Her Love/I Hear Wedding Bells
- 3221 Bobby Russell & The Starlights - Pinki/There Is something On Your Mind
- 3222 Bobby Russell & The Starlights - Negro Pensamiento/Albur De Amor
- 3224 Trio Los Magnificos - Ay Caray, Caray/Las Cosas
- 3225 Denny Ezba's Gold - Queen Mary/It's A Cryin' Shame
- 3227 Rocky Gil & The Bishops - Por Tu Amable Corazon/Ya No La Chifles
- 3228 Shirley Butler - It's Your Woman/Boogaloo Zoo
- 3229 Los Pablos - Que Poca Cosa/Dame Un Poco De Ti
- 3230 Los Twiliters de Fidel Barela - Sone De Ti/Por La Nada
- 3231 Gilbert & The Blue Notes - Egoismo/Pretita Linda
- 3232 Los Fabulosos Dominos - No Te Juegues La Vida/Volvera A Ser Mia
- 3233 Los Muchachos - Hasta Luego Corazon/El Rebelde
- 3234 Bobby Russell Con El Mariachi Sinfonico Reyes - Yo Quiero Ser/Un Piano, Un Disco, Una Noche Y Tu
- 3235 Rocky Gil & The Bishops - Oily/Looking For A lover
- 3236 The Lovin' Kind - Afro Soul/I'll Never Fall In Love Again
- 3237 Lee Longoria Y Sus Alcones - Si No Me Quieres Te Mato/La Pildora
- 3238 Los Pablos - Tu Camino Y El Mio/Solo Contigo
- 3240 Trio Los Magnificos - Fue En El Ayer/Eternamente
- 3241 Tommy Hammond - I'll Never Let You Go (Little Darling)/The Blues Stepped In
- 3242 Rocky Gil & The Bishops - El Venadito/Muchachita Misteriosa
- 3243 Mel Moran - Metida De Pata/Esta Noche La Paso Contigo
- 3244 Los Monarcas - Buenos Consejos/Cuando Despiertes
- 3245 The Lovells - Como Un Perro/Petrolero (1969)
- 3246 The Lovells - You're A Friend Of Mine/Tell Me The Truth (1969)
- 3247 Simon Reyes & The Bourbonstreet Bums - Mama, Mama (English)/Mama, Mama (Spanish)
- 3248 Chuck Price - Gray Eyes You Know/Just For The Heck Of It
- 3252 Rocky Gil & The Bishops - Polytechnic Mambo/Las Gueras
- 3253 Jim Knight - Two Different Worlds/The Wrong Side Of Town
- 3254 Los Pablos - No Se Porque/Cachete A Cachete
- 3255 Rudy "Tee" Gonzales & The Reno Bops - Fagi Polka (Fudgie Polka)/El Corrido De Lubbock
- 3256 Los Fabulosos Magos Jorge Y Gilberto - Estas Perdiendo/No Quiero Despedir
- 3257 Los Pablos - Cocha Perdida/La NaveDel Olvido (vocal: Jose Emilio Fuentes)
- 3262 Los Stardusters - It Must Be The Girl/Peanuts
- 3263 Jorge & Los Downbeats - Botella Envenenada/Si No Me Cumples
- 3264 The Jives - Te La Llevaste/Fuistes El Primer Amor
- 3265 Vic Love & The Lovell Orchestra - No Puedo Quererte/Esta Tarde Vi Llover
- 3266 Rudy T. Gonzalez Y El Barrio - Te Solte La Rienda/La Ultima Voz
- 3267 The Jives - Love/I Want You
- 3268 Rudy T. Gonzalez Y El Barrio - Te La Llevaste/Gracias, Senor Presidente
- 3269 Stardusters - Para Morir Nacimos/Vengo Por Ti (1971)
- 3270 Charlie y Los Jives - Lazos De Mi Amor/Amor Sin Fin (1971)
- 3271 Simon Reyes - Amor De La Calle/Te Extrano
- 3272 Kiko Alavarez - Brindemos Por Ellas/Un Pobre No Mas
- 3273 Rudy Gonzales & The Reno Bops - Mandame Tu Carino/Tal Vez
- 3274 Charlie y Los Jives - Cuidado Con La Mano/Tu Falso Amor (1971)
- 3276 Rudy "Tee" Gonzales & The Reno Bops - Tristes Dias, Tristes Noches/¿Qué Pasó?
- 3277 Gary & The Epics - El Amor Que Soñaba/Asi-Asi
- 3278 Charlie & The Jives - Sad Girl/No Tengo Dinero (Ain't Got No Money) (1971)
- 3279 Goyo Flores - San Buena/Corrido De San Antonio
- 3280 Kiko Alvarez - El Adios/El Vino No Mata
- 3281 Charlie Y Los Jives - Allergia/No Era Tu Illusion
- 3282 Juan Diaz - Volver Volver/La A Guitada
- 3284 Los Reyneros - Tierrita Del Panteon/Los Galan Con Los Reyneros - Gaviola Traidora
- 3285 Rudy Gonzales & The Reno Bops - Together Again/Rosas Son Rosas
- 3286 Juan Antonio Sifuentes Y Los Ayalas - Eres Un Corazon/Mi Suerte
- 3287 Volunteers (JD & The El Dorados) - Sweet Dreams/You'll Lose A Good Thing
- 3288 Gary & The Epics - Cuantas Veces/Muñequita
- 3289 Joel Aleman - Si Tienes Corazon/Me Has Pagado Mal
- 3290 Hnos. Landeros Y Los Canarios - No Te Olvides De Acordate/Sabras Dios Porque
- 3291 Charlie & The Jives - Por Tal Que Seas Feliz/Sin Ley
- 3292 Rudy Tee Gonzales - Sing Me Back Home/Am I That Easy To Forget
- 3294 The Fabulous Latin Numerals - Amor Inseparable/En Esa Manana
- 3296 Gustavo Claudio Y Sangre - Mi Chocotate/Por favor
- 3297 Beatriz Llamas "La Paloma Del Norte" - Voy A Rifar Mi Corazon/Paloma Olvidada
- 3298 Sunny And The Sunliners - Cien Anos/Por Si Me Olvidas
- 3299 Poli Chavez Y Sus Coronados - Ambicion/Ya Se Que No Es Feliz
- 3302 Los Vientos De Gustavo Claudio - A La Media Noche/Copa Y El Rey
- 3306 Chucho Moreno Y Conjunto - Un Amor Imposible/De Mi Llanto Beberas
- 3307 Los Astronautas -De Cachetito/Mi Paraciada
- 3308 Ramon Gutierrez "El Halcon Norteno" - Quejas De Mi Alma/Soyosando
- 3309 Beatriz Llamas La Paloma Del Norte - Amor Secreto/Vuelve Vuelve
- 3310 Julio Casas Con Conjunto - Por Despecho/Amor Eterno
- 3311 Amando Balderrama Y Los Faros - La Empalisa/Yerba Mala
- 3312 Juan Ramos Y Los Principes De Nueva Laredo - Carlos Zamudio/El Cobo Juan Antonio Robledo
- 3313 Chucho Moreno Y Su Conjunto - Perdido De Sentimiento/El Enyerbado
- 3315 Los Aztecas - Festival Vallenato/Prueba De Amor
- 3316 Henry Zimmerle Y Conjunto San Antonio - Dame Poder/El Celoso (1974)
- 3317 Henry Zimmerle - Ando Perdido/Enamore De Ti
- 3318 Juan Ramos Y Los Principes De Nuevo Laredo - Viva Matamoros/El Papelero (1975)
- 3319 Nobleza Mexicana - Sonar/Ingrato Corazon
- 3320 Los Aztecas - Charanga Costena/Mira Lo Que Son Las Cosas (1975)
- 3321 Rudy "Tee" Gonzalez y Los Renos - El Tejano Enamorado/Un Ratito (1975)
- 3322 Julio Casas Mariachi Nuevo San Juan Y Conjunto - El Zacatecano/El Mexico Americano (1975)
- 3323 Juan Ramos Y Los Principes De Nuevo Laredo - Palomita Palomita/La Zenaida Se Caso (1975)
- 3324 Beatriz Llamas - De Limosna No/Mis Noches Negras (1975)
- 3325 Henry Zimmerle - Prison De Amor/Algun Dia (1975)
- 3326 Nobleza Mexicana - Solo Un Milagro/Cuando Llegue El Invierno (1975)
- 3327 Los Vampiros - Por No Creer En Mi/Dejenme Llorar Por Ella (1975)
- 3328 La Fuerza - Me Estas Gustando/Sea Mi Condema
- 3329 Tiny Fuller - Someone Special/Tiny's Thing (1975)
- 3330 Juan Ramos Y Los Principes De Nvo. Laredo - Coral (La Novia Del Pescador)/Mi Conjunto (1975)
- 3331 Henry Zimmerle - Shutters And Boards/Without Your Love
- 3332 Julio Casas Con El Mariachi Nuevo San Juan - Noche Feliz/Despedida De Soltero (1975)
- 3333 Juan Ramos Y Los Principes De Nuevo Laredo - Mataron La Nueva Zenaida/Al ver Que Te Vas (1975)
- 3334 Denny Ezba - Lover's Rain/I Miss You
- 3335 Rudy Gonzales & The Reno Bops - Pledging My love/Jalisco
- 3336 Henry Zimmerle - Que Sacrificio/Gotitas De Sangre
- 3338 Sandy Samples - The Knock/He Said Everything But Stay (1976)
- 3339 Henry Zimmerle - Calor De Otros Brazos/Mejor Solito (1976)
- 3340 Carroll Gilley - Twelve Red Roses/Skidrow Hall Of Fame (1976)
- 3341 Juan Ramos Y Los Principes De Nuevo Laredo - El Troquero Moderno En C.B./Dos Amigos (1976)
- 3342 Geno Zavala - Como Has Sufrido/Yo Sin Tu Amor (1976)
- 3345 Jim Knight - Wrong Side Of Town/South Bound Train To Memphis (1976)
- 3346 Johnny Joe And B.J. - There Goes My Everything/I Ain't Never Gonna Get Married Again (1976)
- 3348 Lee Williams - Chokin' Kind/Since I Fell For You (1976)
- 3351 Shirley Lee - Amelia/Amelia (1976)
- 3353 Jimmy Velvit - Don't Go Near A Woman/Hey Nashville
- 3354 Henry Zimmerle - Eres Mi Droga/El Tira Dinero (1976)
- 3355 Carroll Gilley And Southern Comfort - I'm Gonna Try To Forget About You/Let Me Keep Your Love (1976)
- 3357 Hip Linkchain - My Whole Life Baby/Night Life [Tear Drop UR3357 Chicago, Il] (1982)
- 3357 Beatriz Llamas La Paloma Del Norte - Que Nos Juzgue Dios/El Corrido De Abel Jimenez (El Giro) (1976)
- 3358 Juan Ramos - Amelia/Eres Mi Sol (You Are My Sunshine) (1976)
- 3359 Julio Casas Y Su Mariachi Nuevo San Juan - Amiga/Se Me Pasaron Las Copas (1976)
- 3361 Ray Solis - Gotta Find My Baby/ Just Because (Nomas Porque)
- 3363 Johnny Joe Y Los Fantasticos Sandovales - EL Naranjal/Nube Gris (1976)
- 3365 Henry Zimmerle Y Su Conjunto - Gavilancito/Borracho Me Han De Amar (1976)
- 3367 Tom Wayne - Victims Of The Pretty Things In Life/Please Don't Ever Stop
- 3369 Henry Baldrrama Y La Patria - Amor Chicano Es Para Siempre/Esta Es Mi Vida (1976)
- 3371 Cruz Alvarado - Dos Almas/Comprende Me (1977)
- 3373 Juan Ramos Y Los Principes - Memo Chapa/Mi Esperanza (1977)
- 3374 Hermanos Rizo - Nudo Ciego/Me Lo Contaron Ayer (1977)
- 3375 Apple Jack - Whiskey And The Wheel/She'd Never Even Been There (1977)
- 3376 Henry Balderrama Y La Patria - Dos Corazones/Candilejas (1977)
- 3377 Lee Roy Mora - Te Voy A Regalar Mi Vida/Nuestra Tumba (1977)
- 3378 Dueto Los Galan - Muchos Vasos De Vino/Deje A Mis Padres (1977)
- 3379 Andres Rivera - No Me Guardes Rincor/Poquito A Poquito (1977)
- 3382 Carroll Gilley & The Southern Comfort - Wine, Wine, Wine/There Is Something On Your mind (1977)
- 3383 Jimmy Velvit - Drinking Champagne/I Like Her There (1977)
- 3384 Henry Balderrama Y La Patria - Adios Mariquita Linda/Mi Guitarra Vieja (1977)
- 3386 La Orquesta Suave De Richard R. Uribe - Gloria/Confesion (1977)
- 3389 Henry Zimmerle Y Su Conjunto - No Me Dejes Nunca Nunca Nunca/Cambio Mi Suerte (1977)
- 3391 Pimienta - Guera Oh' Guero/Seras Mia (1977)
- 3392 Andres Rivera - Tu Bien Sabes/Escoria Humana (1977)
- 3393 Henry Balderrama - La Ultima Vez/Me Ayudas A Vivir (1977)
- 3395 Jimmy Velvit - Oh Lonesome Me-Detroit City/Crazy Arms
- 3396 Carroll Gilley - Dream On Dreamer/I'll Be To Her (What She'll Be To Me)
- 3397 Juan Ramos Y Los Principes - Elvis Presley: El Rey Del Rock N' Roll/Te Vas Angel Mio (1977)
- 3398 Julio Casas Con Mariachi - Pesares/Regresa Ya (1977)
- 3405 Gene Summers - Goodbye Priscilla (Bye Bye Blue Baby)/blank side (promo) (1977)
- 3405 Gene Summers - Goodbye Priscilla (Bye Bye Baby Blue)/World Of Illusion (1977)
- 3408 Henry Zimmerle Y Su Conjunto - Jingle Bells/Amarga Navidad (1977)
- 3409 Henry Zimmerle Y Su Conjunto - Hasta Que Tuve La Dicha/La Carga (1977)
- 3410 Benny Ornelas (El Galan) - Vi Venir Una Nube/Chaparrita Chaparrita (1977)
- 3412 Johnny Wiginton & The Tupelo Addition - Luckenbach Two-Step/Third Rate Romance (1977)
- 3414 Rudy "Tee" (Gonzales) - Oh Baby I'm Crying/A Pair Of Seven's (1978)
- 3416 Inflight Band - No Time/Hey Judy (1978)
- 3418 Juan Ramos - Acapulco Rock/Son Tus Perfumenes Mujer (1978)
- 3421 Henry Balderrama - Vuelvo A Querer/Me Preguntaron Por Ti
- 3422 Rudy And Rudy - Lo Siento Mi Vida/Silver Wings (Alas De Plata) (1978)
- 3425 Jeff Lopez - Jacob/Jenny (1978)
- 3426 Paul & Jerry - Fanny Mae/Fooled Around & Fell In Love (1978)
- 3428 Juan Ramos Y Los Principes De Nuevo Laredo - De Todo Como En Botica/Los Dos Inditos (1978)
- 3429 Julio Casas Con Mariachi - Pideme Dios Mio/Tus Ofensas (1978)
- 3430 Eddie Torres - Vida De Mi Vida/Lamento Triste (1978)
- 3432 Jay Garcia - El Papel/Tiempo Feliz (1978)
- 3438 Jay Garcia - Necesito Tu Amor/Maria Rosa
- 3440 Conjunto De Lorenzo Hernandez - De Nuevo Mia/Por Ella Bebo (1978)
- 3445 Ray Gonzalez - El Diablo Y Yo/Siento Perderla (1978)
- 3454 Juan Ramos Y Los Principes - El Ano Viejo (1979)
- 3456 Ramon Garcia Y Su Conjunto - Camino De Espinas/Jamas (1979)
- 3457 Machismo - Aquel Amor Que Se Le Fue/Esta Fiebre (1979)
- 3458 Street People - Juro Que Nunca Volvere/Carinito De Mi Vida (1979)
- 3464 Beatriz Llamas - Te Vas A Arrepentir/El Amor Que Pedi (1979)
- 3465 Juan Ramos Y Los Principes - Viajando Con La Migra/La Guillotina (1980)
- 3466 Street People - No Me Quiere/De Milagro
- 3470 Wayne Michaels - Wicked Woman/You're Just Buying Someone Elses Troubles (1981)
- 3473 Black Mountain - Get To Know You/Rubber Dolly (1981)
- 3476 Street People - De Nada Sirvio Querete/Sonado Un Amor
- 3479 Doug Sahm - Who Were You Thinking Of/Velma From Selma
- 3481 Doug Sahm - I'm Not A Fool Anymore/Don't Fight It (1983)
- 3486 Fast Buck - When The Moon Goes Down On Medina Lake/Best Game In Town (1983)
- 3487 Bad News - No Soy Juguete/El Sol Y La Flor (1983)
- 3490 Bobby Rio Band - Time Won't Let Me/I Know Better (1984)
- 3491 Lydia Rubio Y Texas Express - No Quiero Mas Llorar/Take These Chains (1984)
- 3495 Buddy Ace - It's All For You/I'll Love You
- 3600 Trooper Rusty Martin - A Soldier's Promise/Blue And Gray

Note: Kenny James (#3002) is actually Jimmy Donley

== Sources ==
"Down in Houston: Bayou City Blues"
Osborne's Record Guide
Texas Monthly Magazine
A Guide to the Huey Meaux Papers, 1940–1994
Texas Music Industry Directory (published by The Texas Music Office) Office of the Governor, Austin, Texas
Born To Be A Loser: The Jimmy Donley Story by Johnnie Allan and Dr Bernice Larson Webb; Copyright 1992 by Jadfel Publishing Lafayette, LA
Chicano Soul: Recordings and History of An American Culture by Ruben Molina; Copyright 2007 by Mictlan Publishing; 1st Edition.
Review: 'South Texas" Collects Producer's Checkered Career, (Huey P. Meaux). (NPR Web Site:Playlist-Transcript; 08-12-13).
Houston Bound: Culture And Color In A Jim Crow City by Tyina L. Steptoe; Copyright 2015 by University Of California Press Oakland, California.
House Of Hits: The Story Of Houston's Gold Star/Sugar Hill Recording Studios by Andy Bradley and Roger Wood: Copyright 2010 by University Of Texas Press Austin, Texas.

== See also ==
- List of record labels
