= Alta Records =

American record label

Alta Records was a record label founded in Dallas, Texas in the early 1960s by radio personality Jim Lowe. Lowe was a DJ who hosted a rhythm and blues program "Kat's Karavan" from the WRR-AM studios. He was one of the first DJs in the Southwest to introduce early R&B recording artists to the area. Lowe was also noted for airing his "Library Of Laughs".

Alta Records were produced for the Top 40 radio market and they had several chart successes.

== Alta Records discography ==
- 100: Gloria Barr: "Ain't That A Crying Shame"/"Love Me"
- 101: Adam Lee: "Cruel Cruel World"/"Stairway of Love"
- 102: The Destinys: "Think About It"/"What's Up"
- 103: Odell Booker: "Chi Bob"/"Come Cry On My Shoulder"
- 104: Gene Summers: "You Said You Loved Me"/"Tomorrow"
- 105:
- 106: Gene Summers: "Dance Dance Dance"/"Juke Box Memories"
- 107: Larry Agan: "Honey Don't"/"Cryin' Time"
- 108: Jimmy Velvit: "That's All I Got From You" (w/Bobby Hendricks)"/"I Got A Feeling"
- 109: Jimmy Velvit: "Sometimes I Wonder"/"My Heart Is In Your Hand"
- 110:
- 111: Peyton Park: "Bad Mouth"/"Blue Norther (1964)
- 112: Smokey's Stompers: "Gone"/"My Days Are Numbered"
- 113: Glenn Keener: "Oil Break"/"Tracking"
- 114: Susie Johnson: "Sweet Bird"/"Mourning Dove"
- 115: Susie Johnson: "10,000 Tears"/"Time Hurries by"

== See also ==
- List of record labels
