= The Ultimate School of Rock & Roll =

The Ultimate School of Rock 'n Roll

Compilation album by Gene Summers
- Released: 1997
- Recorded: 1957–1977, Los Angeles, Dallas, Fort Worth
- Genres: Rock 'n roll, rockabilly
- Label: Crystal Clear Sound (United States)
- Producers: Phil York, David Dennard, Sam Paulos-Executive Producer

Gene Summers chronology
| School of Rock 'n Roll (1993) | The Ultimate School of Rock 'n Roll (1997) | Do Right Daddy (2004) |

The Ultimate School Of Rock & Roll is a 32-track CD by Gene Summers. It is a compilation of his biggest hits including out-takes and alternate tracks. The CD was released nationally in the United States by Crystal Clear Sound Records in 1997 and is still in print. It was issued as a deluxe edition with an insert booklet containing 16 printed pages with extensive photos plus exclusive liner notes by Phil York (Yorktown Digital, USA).

Credits - Compilation producer: Phil York, Digital audio restoration: Phil York for Big Y Productions, A&R/Production supervision: David Dennard, Executive producer: Sam Paulos, Mastered at Crystal Clear Studios by Keith Rust, Art direction, Design: Frank Laudo, Digital illustration: Robert Greeson, Digital scans: Marci Fermier, Liner notes: Phil York, Photographs, sound sources and memorabilia courtesy of the Gene Summers Archives, the Tom Fleeger Collection, the Phil York Archives and the Steve Bonner Collection. Special thanks to: Tom Fleeger, Jan Records, Jane Records, Song Productions, Inc., Ted Music, Steve Bonner, George Gimarc, Terry Smith, LeBill Music, Jim Lowe and Alta Records.

Session musicians - Joe Adams - background vocals, James Anderson - guitar; Kevin Bailey - background vocals, Al "TNT" Braggs - background vocals, Bill Brown - piano, Red Callendar - bass; Jack Castleberry - bass, Robert Clark - 12-string guitar, guitar, James Clay - saxophone, Joe Cook - guitar, Hal Cormike - keyboards, Ronnie Dawson - drums, Jesse Lee Floyd - background vocals, Paul Glen - organ, Junior Graham - bass, Rene Hall - guitar, Ray Hildebrand - background vocals, Bill Hudson - acoustic guitar, Plas Johnson - saxophone, Paul Kearney - background vocals, Glenn Keener - guitar, David (Dave) Martin - bass, James McClung - guitar, piano, Art McNulty - organ; Gary Mears - guitar, background vocals, Charlie Mendias - drums; Marvin ("Smokey")Montgomery - banjo, Gary Moon - drums, Sammy Myers - organ, Dahrell Norris - drums, Earl Palmer - drums, Harlan Powell - guitar, Freddie Powers - bass, The Joe Ramirez Combo, Charlie Rios - bass, Mel Robinson - saxophone, Sol Samuels - drums, Dave Stanley - bass, Gene Summers - acoustic guitar, vocals, Billy Fred Thomas - background vocals, James Thomas - drums, Cal Valentine - background vocals, Robert Valentine - backgroung vocals, Ernest Walker - organ, piano, Benny Williams - bass, C.B. Williams - saxophone.

== Album reviews ==
- "The perfect summation of Gene Summers' career, The Ultimate School of Rock & Roll offers 32 tracks spanning the years 1957-77, although the preponderance of the collection is devoted to his early rockabilly and rock'n'roll recordings. Summers was a regional artist, but his classic rockabilly sides are masterpieces of the genre. In the '60s Summers stuck with rock'n'roll instead of performing straight country like most former rockabilly artists, and his efforts from this period wouldn't sound out of place on the Nuggets box set. Also of interest is a topical song from 1968 about the theft of Bonnie (of Bonnie and Clyde fame) Parker's headstone, and a song written for Elvis on which he approximates Elvis' vocal style. A lot of care obviously went into this package, which features excellent notes, session info, photos, and numerous previously unreleased tracks." - Greg Adams, All Music Guide, 1997
- ".....All of Gene Summers’ rocking recordings together on one CD –what more could a rockabilly fan ask for? Also included are rare out-takes and previously unissued performances from the Head Teacher at the School of Rock 'n Roll." - CD Review, 1999
- "In my hands I have maybe the most complete Gene Summers compilation ever released, the best looking one for sure, this set of 35 tracks is based on another compilation released in 1997 in the USA by Crystal Clear Sound from Dallas, Texas. In order to offer the Rockabilly side of Summers the pals at Roller Coaster have excluded some of the songs from the 1960s originally released by Crystal Clear and which won't be missed by the Rockabilly lovers and have added 14 unreleased tracks that are partly songs from the 1950s and mostly different versions of Nervous, Twixteen, Fancy Dan and others, plus a few recordings from the early 1980s made in England with the best Rockabilly musicians of the moment backing Summers. The presentation of the CD on a cardboard open out sleeve cannot be better; filled with cool pictures and a 28 page booklet in the fabulous line of the latest Rollercaster Records releases, the Rolapak rules again! A must have. -Carlos Diaz, Rock Therapy Magazine, 1999
- Rockin' Rock A Billy, February 20, 2007
  "An excellent rock-a-billy CD. I'd put it at the top of my rock-a-billy collection, which is pretty good sized. A must have disc for rock-a-billy music fans. We play it a lot during the Rock-a-billy Review radio show." - The Mean-Eyed Cat, KNON-FM radio, Dallas, Texas
- Excellent & essential, March 4, 2007
  "Top notch material, revved up 3 chord R&R and a few smooth ballads. Good quality mastering (probably from vinyl but sounds very good).... I hadn't heard much about Gene until someone sent an MP3, and I got the full CD. Why he isn't up there with Gene (Vincent), Eddie (Cochran) and Buddy (Holly) I really don't know! Added many tracks to my oldies station, excellent stuff!" - AnotherMusicExpert (Duluth, MN USA)

== Track listing ==
(A star (*) denotes a track which is previously unreleased)

1. "School of Rock 'n Roll"
2. "Nervous"
3. "Straight Skirt"
4. "Gotta Lotta That"
5. "I'll Never Be Lonely"
6. "Twixteen"
7. "Someone Somewhere"*
8. "Alabama Shake"*
9. "Almost Persuaded"*
10. "You Said You Loved Me"
11. "Dance Dance Dance"
12. "If You Don't Come Home"*
13. "Just Because"
14. "Fancy Dan"*
15. "Big Blue Diamonds"
16. "Someone Somewhere"*
17. "Almost 12:O'Clock"
18. "The Push"*
19. "The Great Pretender"*
20. "Broken Dreams"*
21. "Alabama Shake"
22. "The Clown"
23. "World of Illusion"
24. "Cloudy Day"
25. "Who Stole The Marker (From the Grave of Bonnie Parker)?"
26. "Goodbye Priscilla (Bye Bye Baby Blue)"
27. "Suzie Q"
28. "Baby Are You Kiddin'"
29. "Twixteen"*
30. "Nervous"*
31. "Rockaboogie Shake"
32. "Gotta Lotta That"*

== Discography references ==
- Gene Summers discography from Rockin' Country Style, United States
- Gene Summers discography from Rocky Productions, France
- Gene Summers discography from Wangdangdula Finland
- Gene Summers session data from Tapio's Fin-A-Billy, Finland

== Sources ==
- Article and sessionography in issue 15 (1977) of New Kommotion Magazine UK
- Article and sessionography in issue 23 (1980) of New Kommotion Magazine UK
- Feature article and sessionography in issue 74 (1999) of Rockin' Fifties Magazine Germany
- Feature article with photo spread in issue 53 (2000) of Bill Griggs' Rockin' 50s Magazine United States
- Feature Article with photo spread in issue 54 (2000) of Bill Griggs' Rockin' 50s Magazine United States
