= Apex Records =

Canadian record label

Apex Records (Canada)
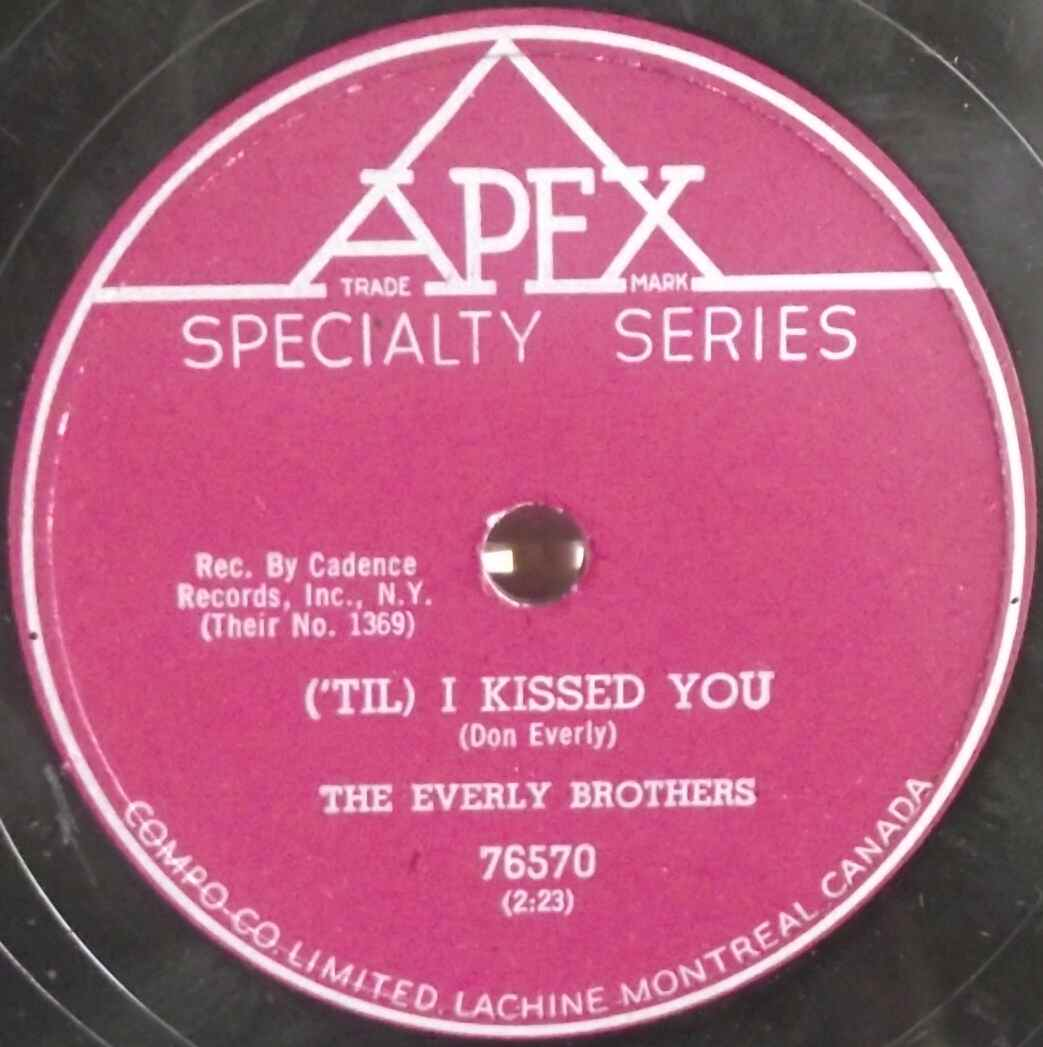
- Parent company: Compo Company
- Founded: 1921
- Defunct: 1980
- Status: Defunct
- Distributor(s): Decca Records; MCA Records
- Genre: Pop
- Country of origin: Canada
- Location: Toronto, Ontario

Apex Records was a Canadian record label owned by the Compo Company which lasted as late as 1980.

Compo established the Apex label in July 1921 in Toronto. It released American recordings from Okeh Records and Gennett Records, among others. It also released recordings by Canadian artists for both the Anglophone and Francophone communities.

After Compo began a distribution arrangement with Decca Records (USA) in 1935, the Apex name was dropped. Apex was revived in 1942 to market Canadian recordings. American Decca bought Compo in 1951. In 1952, Apex resumed issuing American recordings from the various independent American record companies which were established after World War II. Compo was renamed MCA Records (Canada) in 1970, retaining the Apex label for Francophone recordings for a few years before phasing out the label. MCA Canada formally abandoned the trademark in 1984.

== Discography of 45 rpm singles (incomplete) ==
Listed in alphabetical order by artist's first name:

Artist	Catalogue #	Lead single	B-side Single
Al Alberts	76833	"Till Then"	"Blue O'Clock In The Morning"
Andy Williams	76577	"Lonely Street'	"Summer Love'
Andy Williams	76627	"I'm So Lonesome I Could Cry"	"The Village of Saint Bernadette"
Archie Bleyer	76697	"Mustafa"	"Jimmie's Blues"
Bill Hayes	76057	"The Ballad of Davy Crockett"	"Farewell"
Bill Justis	76208	"Raunchy"	"Midnight Man"
Bobby Vinton	76822	"I Love You the Way You Are"	"You're My Girl"
The Bobbettes	76849	"Teddy"	"Row Row Row"
The Bobbettes	76899	"My Mama Said"	"Sandman"
Brenda & The Tabulations	77037	"Dry Your Eyes"	"The Wash"
Brother Dave Gardner	76166	"White Silver Sands"	"Fat Charlie"
Buchanan Brothers	77097	"Medicine Man Part 1"	"Medicine Man Part 2"
Buckstone Hardware	77098	"Pack It In"	"You're Still Feelin' Better"
Buddy Knox	76229	"Swingin' Daddy"	"Whenever I'm Lonely"
The Original Casuals	76241	"So Tough"	"I Love My Darling"
Champs	76643	"Too Much Tequila"	"Twenty Thousands Leagues"
Champs	76702	"Coconut Grove"	"Alley Cat"
Champs	76843	"Mr. Cool"	"3/4 Mash"
Champs	76912	"Switzerland"	"Only the Young"
The Chancellors	76950	"Little Latin Lupe Lu"	"YoYo"
The Chancellors	76970	"So Fine"	"I'm a Man"
Chordettes	76068	"Humming Bird"	"I Told A Lie"
Chordettes	76090	"Born to Be with You"	"Love Never Changes"
Chordettes	76099	"Teen Age Goodnight"	"Lay Down Your Arms"
Chordettes	76290	"Zorro"	"Love Is A Two-Way Street"
Chordettes	76693	"A Broken Vow"	"All My Sorrows"
Christopher Kearney	77113	"Theme for Jody"	"Long Old Train"
Cleftones	76094	"Neki-Hokey"	"Can't We Be Sweethearts?"
Counts	76994	"Searchin'"	"He Will Break Your Heart"
Dave "Baby" Cortez	76828	"Fiesta"	"Hey Hey Hey"
Del Shannon	76883	"Sue's Gotta Be Mine"	"Now She's Gone"
Dickey Lee	76941	"She's Walking Away"	"Big Brother"
Dickie Goodman	76819	"Ben Crazy"	"Flip Side"
Doc Burch	76439	"Catch a Little Moonbeam"	(unknown)
Ritchie Valens	76472	"That's My Little Suzie"	"In A Turkish Town"
Don Abraham/The Ambassadors	76798	"Cruel Betty, Cruel"	"International Twist"
Donna Loren	76839	"I'm In Love With the Ticket Taker at The Bijou Movie"	"I'm Gonna Be All Right"
Donna Loren	76867	"Dream World"	"(Remember Me) I'm the One Who Loves You"
Donna Loren	76881	"I'm Gonna Be All Right"	"Johnny's Got Something"
Everly Brothers	76191	"Wake Up Little Susie"	"Maybe Tomorrow"
Everly Brothers	76392	"Problems"	"Love Of My Life"
Ritchie Valens	76530	"Little Girl"	"We Belong Together"
Everly Brothers	76570	"(Till) I Kissed You"	"Oh, What a Feeling"
Everly Brothers	76644	"Let It Be Me"	"Since You Broke My Heart"
Frankie Lymon	76427	"Up Jumped a Rabbit"	"No Matter What You've Done"
Gene Summers and his Rebels	76278	"School of Rock 'n Roll"	"Straight Skirt"
Gene Summers and his Rebels	76306	"Nervous"	"Gotta Lotta That"
The Harptones	76111	"Three Wishes"	"That's The Way It Goes"
The Hollywood Flames	76222	"Buzz-Buzz-Buzz"	"Crazy"
J-Double-R (HipHop Artist Canadian & Usa)	76636	"Soo City"	"Hip-Hop Re'Birth"
Jerry Wallace	76954	"You're Driving You Out of My Mind"	"Helpless"
Jimmie Rodgers	76283	"Make Me a Miracle"	"Secretly"
Jimmie Rodgers	76390	"Tucumcari"	"The Night You Became Seventeen"
Jimmie Rodgers	76391	"Bimbombey"	"You Understand Me"
Jimmie Rodgers	76510	"Ring-a-ling-a-lario"	"Wonderful You"
Jimmy Bowen	76149	"I Trusted You"	"Warm Up to Me Baby"
Jimmy Dean	76022	"Release Me"	"Sweet Darling"
Johnny Thunder	76842	"Loop de Loop"	"Don't Be Ashamed"
Kirby St. Romaine	76872	"Bambola"	"Empty Arms Again"
Kirby Stone Four	76180	"S'Wonderful"	"Raven"
Maymie & Robert	76164	"Ain't No Way in the World"	"Parting Tears"
The Penguins	76056	"Earth Angel"	"Hey Senorita"
The Playmates	76380	"Beep Beep"	"Your Love"
The Raftsmen	76886	"Something to Sing About"	"Kelligrew's Soiree"
The Regents	76761	"Runaround"	"Laura My Darling"
Ritchie Valens	76402	"Donna"	"La Bamba"
The Rock-A-Teens	76591	"Woo-Hoo"	"Untrue"
Ronnie Dove	76021	"Cry"	"Autumn Rhapsody"
Ronnie Dove	76923	"Say You"	"Let Me Stay Today"
Ronnie Dove	76935	"Right or Wrong"	"Baby, Put Your Arms Around Me"
Ronnie Dove	76956	"One Kiss for Old Times' Sake"	"Bluebird"
Ronnie Dove	76966	"A Little Bit of Heaven"	"If I Live to Be a Hundred"
Ronnie Dove	76974	"I Had to Let You Go"	"I'll Make All Your Dreams Come True"
Ronnie Dove	76983	"Kiss Away"	"Where In The World"
Joey Hollingsworth	76996	"That's Why I Love You Like I Do"	"Little Dandelion"
Ronnie Dove	77003	"Happy Summer Days"	"Long After"
Ronnie Dove	77007	"I Really Don't Want To Know"	"Years of Tears"
Ronnie Dove	77032	"One More Mountain to Climb"	"All"
Ronnie Hawkins	76499	"Forty Days"	"One of These Days"
Shirley & Lee	76102	"Let the Good Times Roll"	"Do You Mean to Hurt Me"
The Trashmen	76894	"Surfin' Bird"	"King Of The Surf"
Wayne Newton	76913	"Little White Cloud"	"Born When You Kissed Me"
Vernon Dalhart	76913	"Wreck of the Old 97"	"The Prisoners Song"
Witness Inc.	77044	"I'll Forget Her Tomorrow"	"Girl Before You Go"
Witness Inc.	77063	"Jezebel"	"Not You Girl"
Witness Inc.	77077	"Harlem Lady"	"I Put A Spell On You"
Witness Inc.	77087	"Visions of Vanessa"	"Another Side of Her"
Witness Inc.	77093	"So Come with Me"	"I've Got To Go"
Webb Pierce	76026	"Jilted Love"	"I'm Happy You Hurt Me"
