= The Best of Ronnie Dove =

Compilation album by Ronnie Dove
- Released: 1966
- Genre: Pop
- Label: Diamond
- Producer: Phil Kahl, Ray Vernon

Ronnie Dove chronology
I'll Make All Your Dreams Come True (1965)	The Best of Ronnie Dove (1966)	Ronnie Dove Sings the Hits for You (1966)

The Best of Ronnie Dove is a 1966 compilation album by American pop artist Ronnie Dove.

== History ==
After just three album releases, Diamond Records compiled and released the album. It featured his then-current single When Liking Turns to Loving as the closing track. The song would peak at #6 on the Billboard Easy Listening Chart and #18 on the Top 40 chart. The other tracks were all released on his previous albums.

== Release ==
The album was awarded a gold disk in 1969 for sales of over one million copies. The original 1966 issue was released in both mono and stereo. Both versions were available via Columbia Records Club. The stereo version of the album was reissued digitally in 2021 by Ronnie Dove Music.

=== Chart performance ===
The album debuted on Billboard magazine's Top LP's chart in the issue dated April 2, 1966, peaking at No. 35 during a twenty-one-week run on the chart.

== Track listing ==
No.	Title	Writer(s)	Length
1.	"Say You"	J. B. Hicks	2:22
2.	"Right or Wrong"	Wanda Jackson	2:06
3.	"Hello Pretty Girl"	Tommy Boyce, Wes Farrell	2:20
4.	"Keep It a Secret"	Jessie Mae Robinson	2:30
5.	"Where in the World"	Roy Alfred, Doug Barnd, Wes Farrell	2:06
6.	"One Kiss for Old Times' Sake"	Artie Resnick, Kenny Young	2:35
7.	"A Little Bit of Heaven"	Artie Resnick, Kenny Young	2:33
8.	"Nevertheless, (I'm in Love with You)"	Bert Kalmar, Harry Ruby	2:35
9.	"If I Live to Be a Hundred"	Ben Raleigh, Mark Barkan	2:35
10.	"Kiss Away"	Billy Sherrill, Glenn Sutton	2:37
11.	"I'll Make All Your Dreams Come True"	Beatrice Ross, Wes Farrell	2:29
12.	"When Liking Turns to Loving"	Kenny Young	2:26

== Charts ==
Chart (1966)	Peak position
US Billboard Top LPs	35
