= The Best of Ronnie Dove Volume 2 =

The Best of Ronnie Dove Vol. 2

Compilation album by Ronnie Dove
- Released: 1967
- Recorded: 1966–67
- Genre: Pop
- Label: Diamond
- Producer: Phil Kahl, Neil Diamond

Ronnie Dove chronology
Cry (1967)	The Best of Ronnie Dove Vol. 2 (1967)	Greatest All Time Hits (1970)

The Best of Ronnie Dove Vol. 2 is a 1967 compilation album by pop singer Ronnie Dove.

== History ==
Diamond Records did not issue Dove's then-current single "Dancin' Out of My Heart" on this album, instead deciding to issue its B-side, "Back from Baltimore". According to Dove, Neil Diamond had written the song "Red Red Wine" for Dove to record; however, Phil Kahl turned down the song, claiming Dove had a "teen idol image" he needed to keep. Diamond then wrote "Back from Baltimore" for Dove, since Dove lived there at the time.

== Release ==
The album was issued in both mono and stereo. There was also a special pressing made for the Columbia Records Club. It was Dove's final album for Diamond Records, and the last album Diamond ever released. Dove continued to issue singles on the label until it closed in early 1970.

== Track listing ==
Track	Title	Songwriter(s)	Time
A1	Add Love	Russell Steagall	2:41
A2	Let's Start All Over Again	Al Kasha, Joel Hirschhorn	2:30
A3	Happy Summer Days	Larry Kusik, Ritchie Adams, Wes Farrell	2:08
A4	That's My Desire	Carroll Loveday, Helmy Kresa	2:35
A5	I Want To Love You For What You Are	Norm Simon, Andy Badale	2:45
A6	Cry	Churchill Kohlman	2:47
B1	My Babe	Neil Diamond	2:05
B2	I Really Don't Want to Know	Howard Barnes, Don Robertson	2:49
B3	One More Mountain to Climb	Al Kasha, Joel Hirschhorn	2:20
B4	Back from Baltimore	Neil Diamond	2:29
B5	You Made Me Love You (I Didn't Want to Do It)	Joe McCarthy, James V. Monaco	2:43
B6	The Wedding Song	Jimmy Rose, Larry Gottlick, Bill DeMarco	2:07
