= The Little White Cloud That Cried =

Single by Johnnie Ray
- A-side: "Cry"
- Released: October 1951
- Recorded: October 16, 1951
- Genre: Pop
- Length: 2:14
- Label: Okeh
- Songwriter: Johnnie Ray
- Producer: Mitch Miller

Johnnie Ray singles chronology
"Whiskey And Gin" (1951)	"The Little White Cloud That Cried" (1951)	"Please, Mr. Sun" (1951)

"The Little White Cloud that Cried" is a popular song written by Johnnie Ray and published in 1951.

The biggest hit version was recorded by Ray and The Four Lads in 1951. The recording was released by Okeh Records as catalog number 6840. It was a number 2 hit on the Billboard chart that year and one side of one of the biggest two-sided hits, as the flip side, "Cry," reached number 1 on the Billboard chart. On the Most Played Juke Box Rhythm & Blues Records chart, it went to number 6.

== Other versions ==
- Ronnie Dove covered the song for his album Cry in 1967 for Diamond Records.
- Stan Freberg did a parody on the Johnnie Ray song "Cry", entitled "Try", which he sings "Even Little White Clouds Do It", in reference to Ray's flip side song "Little White Cloud that Cried."
- Vera Lynn recorded a contemporary cover in Britain.
- Doris Day also recorded the song in the 1950s.
- Semprini with Rhythm Acc. recorded the song in London on March 26, 1952 as the first melody of the medley "Part 2. Hit Medley of Foxtrots" along with "I'm Lucky to Have You" and "Tell Me Why." It was released by EMI on the His Master's Voice label as catalog number B 10263.
- Wayne Newton and his brothers recorded a version in 1961 that briefly entered the top 100 as a re-release in 1964.
