= One More Mountain to Climb =

Single by Ronnie Dove

from the album Cry
- B-side: "All"
- Released: February 1967
- Recorded: 1967
- Genre: Pop
- Length: 2:20
- Label: Diamond
- Songwriters: Al Kasha, Joel Hirschhorn
- Producer: Phil Kahl

Ronnie Dove singles chronology
| "Cry" (1966) | "One More Mountain to Climb" (1967) | "My Babe" (1967) |

"One More Mountain to Climb" is the 14th Diamond Records single for Ronnie Dove.

== Background ==
Released in 1967, this single peaked at #45 on the Billboard Pop Singles chart. It was his first single since 1964’s Hello Pretty Girl to miss the Billboard Top 40 chart.

The single's B-side, "All", was originally issued on Dove's 1965 album One Kiss for Old Times' Sake.

According to an episode of Nashville Now, Glen Campbell played on this song.

== Chart positions ==
| Chart (1967) | Peak position |
|---|---|
| Canada (RPM) Top Singles | 39 |
| US Billboard Hot 100 | 45 |
