= Cry (Ronnie Dove album) =

Studio album by Ronnie Dove
- Released: 1967
- Genre: Traditional pop
- Label: Diamond
- Producer: Phil Kahl, Ray Vernon

Ronnie Dove chronology
Ronnie Dove Sings the Hits for You (1966)	Cry (1967)	The Best of Ronnie Dove Volume 2 (1967)

Cry is Ronnie Dove's fifth studio album (and sixth album release) for Diamond Records.

== History ==
The album was released on the strength of his version of the Johnnie Ray song Cry. The title song earned Ronnie an appearance on The Ed Sullivan Show. The album also features the charting single One More Mountain to Climb, which hit the charts in early 1967.

== Release ==
The original album was issued in both stereo and mono. Columbia Records Club also issued the album at the time. The album was reissued on CD in the mid 1990s by Collectables Records, and digitally in 2018 by Ronnie Dove Music.

=== Chart performance ===
The album debuted on Billboard magazine's Top LP's chart in the issue dated March 4, 1967, peaking at No. 121 during a twelve-week run on the chart.

== Track listing ==
No.	Title	Writer(s)	Length
1.	"Walkin’ My Baby Back Home"	Roy Turk, Fred Ahlert	2:22
2.	"Tell the Lady I Said Goodbye"	Johnnie Ray	2:33
3.	"It's the Talk of the Town"	Marty Symes, Al Neiberg, Jerry Livingston	2:15
4.	"The Little White Cloud That Cried"	Johnnie Ray	2:37
5.	"Autumn Rhapsody"	Larry Kusik, Ritchie Adams, Wes Farrell	2:23
6.	"I Can't Stop Loving You"	Don Gibson	2:45
7.	"Wheel of Fortune"	Bennie Benjamin, George Weiss	2:58
8.	"I Won't Cry Anymore"	Fred Wise, Al Frisch	2:32
9.	"One More Mountain to Climb"	Al Kasha, Joel Hirschhorn	2:20
10.	"Years of Tears"	Ben Raleigh, Mark Barkan	2:30
11.	"Cry"	Churchill Kohlman	2:47
