= When Liking Turns to Loving =

Single by Ronnie Dove

from the album The Best of Ronnie Dove
- B-side: "I’m Learning How To Smile Again"
- Released: January 1966
- Recorded: 1965
- Genre: Pop
- Label: Diamond
- Composer: Kenny Young
- Producers: Phil Kahl, Ray Vernon

Ronnie Dove singles chronology
"Kiss Away" (1965)	"When Liking Turns to Loving" (1966)	"Let's Start All Over Again" (1966)

"When Liking Turns To Loving" is a 1966 hit song recorded by pop singer Ronnie Dove.

== Background ==
The song was Dove's eighth charting single. Kenny Young wrote the song and it was released in early 1966 as D-195. After just three albums, Diamond Records released "The Best Of Ronnie Dove" and included "When Liking Turns To Loving" as the closing track. The song made the Top 20 on the Billboard Hot 100 and Top 10 on Billboard's Easy Listening chart.

== Chart performance ==
Chart (1965)	Peak position
Canada (RPM) Top Singles	7
Canada (RPM) AC Singles	19
U.S. Billboard Hot 100	18
U.S. Billboard Easy Listening	6

== Cover Versions ==
Country singer Bill Anderson covered the song on his "I Love You Drops" album, released by Decca Records.
