= The Rebels (rockabilly band) =

American band

- Origin: Dallas, Texas, United States
- Genres: Rock and roll, rockabilly
- Years active: 1957–1961
- Labels: Jan/Jane Records; Jubilee Records; Rhino/Atlantic Records; Apex Records (Canada); Norton Records; Warner Music Group artists Various Indie labels
- Past members: Gene Summers (vocals/guitar); James McClung (guitar); Gary Moon (drums); Benny Williams (slap bass); Bill Brown (piano); Charlie Mendias (drums); Jack Castleberry (electric bass); Codine Craft (piano); C.W. Kendall (piano); Larry Randall (saxophone)

The Rebels was a rockabilly band from Dallas, Texas that recorded "School of Rock 'n Roll" and "Straight Skirt" with Gene Summers. The group consisted of James McClung (guitar), Gary Moon (drums) and Benny Williams (slap bass). They were soon joined by pianist Bill Brown who played on some of their early personal appearances. They were one of the first rock 'n roll bands to record using the name "Rebels" (February 1, 1958), preceding Duane Eddy's Rebels by at least six months and the "Wild Weekend" Rebels by more than two years.

== History ==
The Rebels began their musical career in 1957 while in high school at Duncanville, Texas, joining forces with another classmate and singer Gene Summers. They appeared together on high school assembly programs and soon were playing gigs at the Carswell Air Force Base which at that time was located Northwest of Ft. Worth, Tx. At one of these shows they met a country music comedian nicknamed "Cornbread" who was appearing on a TV show hosted by Neal Jones on KRLD-TV in Dallas. Cornbread was impressed with Summers and The Rebels and invited them to appear on the TV program. This led them to a regular, weekly spot on another television program, also on KRLD, called "Joe Bill's Country Picnic" in the fall of 1957. It was while appearing on this show that they were discovered by songwriter Jed Tarver. He wanted them to record his songs "Straight Skirt", "Nervous", "I'll Never Be Lonely", "Gotta Lotta That" and "Twixteen". With the assistance of their manager/agent, Thomas Wolverton, Tarver was able to get them an audition with Jan Records, a newly formed Dallas label.

Their first release on Jan was on February 1, 1958 and featured Tarver's "Straight Skirt" composition flipped with an original James McClung song "School of Rock 'n Roll". "Straight Skirt" became a regional chart hit and The Rebels found themselves appearing at record hops, concerts and radio and television shows throughout the country. After touring for several months, Williams and Moon decided to pursue other interests and left the band. McClung and Summers replaced them with other musicians and The Rebels continued to perform until 1961. After this, the group disbanded. Summers continued a solo career and was still recording and touring well into the 21st century in both the USA and abroad.
