= A Little Bit of Heaven =

A Little Bit of Heaven may refer to:

- A Little Bit of Heaven (1940 film), a 1940 musical film
- A Little Bit of Heaven (2011 film), a 2011 romantic comedy
- "A Little Bit of Heaven", a parlour song by Ernest Ball recorded by John McCormack and George MacFarlane
- "A Little Bit of Heaven" (Ronnie Dove song), a 1965 hit song by pop singer Ronnie Dove
- "Little Bit of Heaven", a 1993 song by Lisa Stansfield
