= I'll Make All Your Dreams Come True (song) =

"I’ll Make All Your Dreams Come True"

Single by Ronnie Dove

from the album I'll Make All Your Dreams Come True
- B-side: "I Had to Lose You (To Find That I Need You)"
- Released: August 1965
- Recorded: 1965
- Genre: Pop
- Label: Diamond
- Songwriters: Bernice Ross, Wes Farrell
- Producers: Phil Kahl, Ray Vernon

Ronnie Dove singles chronology
"A Little Bit of Heaven" (1965)	"I’ll Make All Your Dreams Come True" (1965)	"Kiss Away" (1965)

"I'll Make All Your Dreams Come True" is a 1965 single that was written by Bernice Ross and Wes Farrell, and performed by Ronnie Dove.

== Background ==
It was Dove's seventh single for Diamond Records and the fifth of eleven releases to make the Top 40 and was arranged by Ray Stevens. It became his biggest hit on the Billboard Easy Listening charts.

== Chart performance ==
Chart (1965)	Peak position
Canada RPM	7
U.S. Billboard Hot 100	21
U.S. Billboard Easy Listening	2
