= Churchill Kohlman =

American songwriter

Churchill Kohlman (January 28, 1906 – May 25, 1983) was an African American songwriter who wrote Johnnie Ray's 1951 hit, "Cry" while working in a Pittsburgh dry cleaning factory as the night watchman. He would visit the local piano teacher, Margaret McClintock, to transcibe his ideas.

Royalties from "Cry" were the subject of a bitter legal dispute between Kohlman and Perry Alexander, owner of music publisher Mellow Music. Alexander was ordered by arbitrators to pay Kohlman $15,331.24 to settle the dispute in 1953.

Kohlman wrote hundreds of other songs, but none achieved the success of "Cry".

Churchill had the following siblings: Homer Kohlman (1907–1985); and Alyse Kohlman Klaytor. After his success with "Cry", he was a correspondent for Prevue, a Chicago-based show-business magazine. He married Viola (1915–1995) and had the following children: Phyllis Kohlman O'Leary and Eleanor Kohlman Smith; and Carl Kohlman. He died under the name Charles Kohlman of a heart attack in 1983, at 77 years old, in the Point Breeze neighborhood of Pittsburgh. His grave is at Homewood Cemetery in Point Breeze.

== Popular culture ==
- The Johnnie Ray version of "Cry" was used in the 1987 Ridley Scott film, Someone to Watch Over Me.

== Other versions ==
- Ronnie Dove recorded the song in 1966, and his version was a Top 20 hit on the Hot 100 and Easy Listening charts. He performed the song on The Ed Sullivan Show the following year.
- Kevin Coyne recorded a version of the song for his 1978 album Dynamite Daze.
