= Don't Take Your Love from Me =

1940 popular song

Song
- Published: 1941
- Songwriter: Henry Nemo

"Don't Take Your Love from Me" is a popular song written by Henry Nemo and published in 1941. Mildred Bailey first recorded this song in 1940 before publication. It was introduced that year by singer Joan Brooks.

== Recorded versions ==
- Mildred Bailey - recorded January 25, 1940 for Columbia Records (catalog. No. 35921).
- Artie Shaw and His Orchestra, vocal by Lena Horne - recorded June 26, 1941 for Victor Records (catalog No. 27509).
- Harry James and His Orchestra (vocal chorus by Lynn Richards) - recorded August 4, 1941 for Columbia Records (catalog No. 36339).
- Glen Gray & the Casa Loma Orchestra (vocal by Eugenie Baird) (1944) - this charted briefly.
- Johnnie Ray - for his album Johnnie Ray (1952)
- The Three Suns (1953) - this reached No. 21 in the Billboard charts.
- Bing Crosby recorded the song in 1954 for use on his radio show and it was subsequently included in the box set The Bing Crosby CBS Radio Recordings (1954-56) issued by Mosaic Records (catalog MD7-245) in 2009.
- The Four Aces with the Jack Pleis Orchestra - for the album Mood for Love (1955).
- Doris Day - included in her album Day by Day (1956).
- Joni James (1956 on her album In the Still of the Night)
- Julie London (1956, on her album Lonely Girl)
- Keely Smith - for her album I Wish You Love (1957).
- Rhonda Fleming (1957)
- Patti Page - for her album I've Heard That Song Before (1958).
- Faron Young (1959)
- Eydie Gormé - a single release in 1959.
- Kay Starr - included in her album Losers, Weepers (1960).
- Ike Quebec on his album Blue & Sentimental (1961)
- Frank Sinatra on his album Come Swing with Me! (1961)
- Frank Sinatra - recorded in 1961 with an arrangement by Don Costa. Released in 1990 on The Reprise Collection
