= School of Rock 'n Roll =

"School Of Rock 'n Roll"

Single by Gene Summers & His Rebels
- A-side: "Straight Skirt"
- B-side: "School Of Rock 'n Roll"
- Released: 1958
- Recorded: 1958 - Los Angeles
- Genre: Rockabilly
- Length: 1:58
- Label: Jan Records (United States); Apex Records (Canada); Rave Records (South Africa)
- Songwriter: James McClung

"School of Rock 'n Roll" is a song composed by James McClung in 1958 and published by Song Productions, BMI the same year. It was originally recorded by American rockabilly singer Gene Summers and his Rebels and was first released in February 1958 by Jan Records #11-100. It was flipped with "Straight Skirt" a teen novelty 45 which became the group's first big regional hit.

"School Of Rock 'n Roll" later became widely known as one of the top 100 rock 'n roll records. In the 1970s, at the beginning of the rockabilly revival in Europe, "School Of Rock 'n Roll" was re-discovered by a new legion of rockabilly fans and bands. Since then, it has become a classic dance floor-filler and has renewed Summers' career to the extent of worldwide concert appearances since 1980.

== Acclaim ==
In 2005 "School of Rock 'n Roll" was selected by Bob Solly and Record Collector Magazine as one of the 100 Greatest Rock 'n' Roll Records. "School Of Rock 'n Roll" was also present in the British television series You've Been Framed and was included on the Rhino Records CD box sets Wild, Fast, And Out Of Control (1999) and Rockin' Bones (2006). The song has also been featured on "Bob Dylan's Theme Time Radio Hour" (2006) and also appears on the Bob Dylan 4-CD box set Radio Radio issued in 2011.

== Cover versions ==
The song has been covered by many performers, including:

- Savage Kalman & Explosion Rockets on their 1979 LP School Of Rock And Roll
- Teen Kats on their 1981 LP After School Rock ‘n Roll
- Red Hot Max And The Cats on their 1989 LP Cuckoo Clock Rock
- The Rhythm Rockets on their 1989 single
- Gary U.S. Bonds on his 1990 compilation CD School Of Rock ‘n Roll: The Best Of Gary U.S. Bonds
- Johnny Reno on his 1990 LP Third Degree
- The Alphabets on their 1991 LP Bowl You Over
- The Lennerockers on their 1991 LP Rebels Of Nowadays
- Mess of Booze on their 1993 CD Ungehobelt & Versoffen
- The Polecats on the 1994 various artists CD Birth Of British Rockabilly Vol.2
- The Vees on their 1995 CD Crash Boom Bang It Out
- The Blue Moon Rockers on their 1996 CD School Of Rock & Roll
- Lucky Strike Band on their 2003 CD If I Had Me A Woman
- Alan Leatherwood on his 2004 CD Rock, Bop, Folk, And Pop
- Rockin’ Ryan and The Real Goners on the 2003 CD Alive And Lowdown, in a live duet with Rory Justice
- Thierry Lecoz on his 2003 album Tex-French Connection
- Rory Justice on the 2004 CD The Rockabilly Kid
- The Starlight Wranglers on the various artists 2004 CD Rough House R&R Vol. 3
- The Greyhounds on their 2004 CD Songs Our Daddies Taught Us
- Black Knights on their 2004 CD Jack in the Box
- Fairlane Rockets on their CD Fairlane Rockets
- Robby Vee on the 2014 CD The Early Years
- Gene Vincent is reported to have made a recording in the late 1960s, but it was not released.
- Various Artists School of Rock 'n Roll was the title for a 2-CD box set compilation released in the late 1990s. CD featured artists from the 1980s including J. Geils Band, Billy Squier, Steve Miller, The Motels, Glass Tiger, Culture Club, Sheena Easton, and others. (CD title obviously inspired by the Gene Summers original, classic 'School Of Rock ‘n Roll')

== Sources ==
- Liner notes "The Ultimate School Of Rock & Roll" 1997 United States
- Article and sessionography in issue 15 (1977) of New Kommotion Magazine UK
- Article and sessionography in issue 23 (1980) of New Kommotion Magazine UK
- Feature article and sessionography in issue 74 (1999) of Rockin' Fifties Magazine Germany
- Feature article with a photo spread in issue 53 (2000) of Bill Griggs' Rockin' 50s Magazine United States
- Feature Article with a photo spread in issue 54 (2000) of Bill Griggs' Rockin' 50s Magazine United States
