= Johnnie Ray (album) =

Studio album by Johnnie Ray
- Released: 1952
- Recorded: October 1951 to February 1952
- Genre: Traditional pop; rhythm & blues
- Label: Columbia
- Producer: Mitch Miller

Johnnie Ray chronology
Johnnie Ray (1952)	I Cry For You (1955)

Johnnie Ray is the debut studio album by Johnnie Ray. The album was released as a 10-inch LP and 78 rpm and 45 rpm box set and was the first album in the history of recorded music to be released with no title. The 78 rpm and 45 rpm box set of this same album simply listed "Johnnie Ray" on the spine. The album was released in 1952 on the Columbia Records label and the catalogue number was CL 6199.

== Reception ==
In a May 3, 1952 issue of Billboard, the album was listed as the fourth best-selling 10-inch 33 1/3 LP in the United States.

Four months later, on September 20, 1952, the record was still in the top ten Billboard sales list, ranked the fifth-best-selling 10-inch; the week prior to that, on September 13, it had been at number 7.

== Track listing ==
No.	Title	Writer(s)	Length
1.	"Don't Blame Me"	Jimmy McHugh; Dorothy Fields
2.	"Walkin' My Baby Back Home"	Fred Ahlert; Roy Turk
3.	"Don't Take Your Love from Me"	Henry Nemo
4.	"All Of Me"	Gerald Marks; Seymour Simons
5.	"Give Me Time"	Alec Wilder
6.	"The Lady Drinks Champagne"	Jacques Wilson; Alan Jeffreys
7.	"Out in the Cold Again"	Rube Bloom; Ted Koehler
8.	"Coffee and Cigarettes"	Doug Arthur; Herb Hendler

2002 reissue
No.	Title	Length
1.	"Don't Blame Me"
2.	"Walkin' My Baby Back Home"
3.	"Don't Take Your Love from Me"
4.	"All Of Me"
5.	"Give Me Time"
6.	"The Lady Drinks Champagne"
7.	"Out in the Cold Again"
8.	"Coffee And Cigarettes"
9.	"Wagon Wheels"
10.	"Empty Saddles"
11.	"Tumbling Tumbleweeds"
12.	"The Last Round-Up"
13.	"Home on the Range"
14.	"Bury Me Out on the Lone Prairie"
15.	"When It's Springtime In The Rockies"
16.	"Ridin' Home"
17.	"Twilight On The Trail"
18.	"Red River Valley"
19.	"I'm An Old Cowhand"
20.	"Cool Water"

== Personnel ==
- Johnnie Ray – vocals
- The Four Lads – vocals (5,6,7,8)
- Vincent Terri – guitar (1,2,3,4)
- Mundell Lowe – guitar (5,6,7,8)
- John Ryan – bass (1,2,3,4)
- Edward 'Eddie' Safranski – bass (5,6,7,8
- Nick Fatool – drums (1,2,3,4)
- Ed Shaughnessy – drums (5,6,7,8)
- Buddy Cole – piano (1,2,3,4)
- Stan Freeman – piano (5,6,8)
- Buddy Weed – piano (7)
- Lucky Thompson – saxophone (5,6,8)

== Chart positions ==
Chart (1952)	Peak position	Ref
Best Selling Pop Albums	3	

=== Singles ===
Year	Single	Peak positions
Year	Single	Best Selling Pop Singles
1952	"Walkin' My Baby Back Home"	6

== Notes and references ==
=== References ===
- Weize, Richard (1999). Johnnie Ray 'Cry' Discography 1951–1956 (Media notes). Bear Family.
