= Ronnie Dove Sings the Hits for You =

Studio album by Ronnie Dove
- Released: 1966
- Genre: Pop
- Label: Diamond
- Producer: Phil Kahl, Ray Vernon

Ronnie Dove chronology
The Best of Ronnie Dove (1966)	Ronnie Dove Sings the Hits for You (1966)	Cry (1967)

Ronnie Dove Sings the Hits for You is Ronnie Dove's fourth studio album (and fifth album release) for Diamond Records.

== History ==
The album gathers Ronnie's latest singles "I Really Don't Want to Know", "Happy Summer Days", and "Let's Start All Over Again", all of which hit the charts in 1966. Mountain of Love" would later appear as the B-side to a 1968 Ronnie Dove single "Never Gonna Cry". However, "Mountain of Love" would be the side to chart. It did not make the Top 40.

The song “Happy Summer Days” was featured in a commercial for Amazon in 2019.

== Release ==
The original album was released in both mono and stereo. The album was reissued in the 90s, and was again reissued, from the original album masters, in 2020.

=== Chart performance ===
The album debuted on Billboard magazine's Top LP's chart in the issue dated October 22, 1966, peaking at No. 122 during a five-week run on the chart.

== Track listing ==
No.	Title	Writer(s)	Length
1.	"Someday (You'll Want Me to Want You)"	Jimmie Hodges	3:30
2.	"I Really Don't Want to Know"	Howard Barnes, Don Robertson	2:55
3.	"On a Slow Boat to China"	Frank Loesser	2:33
4.	"Long After"	Larry Kusik, Ritchie Adams	2:30
5.	"Happy Summer Days"	Larry Kusik, Ritchie Adams, Wes Farrell	2:08
6.	"Let's Start All Over Again"	Al Kasha, Joel Hirschhorn	2:30
7.	"Mountain Of Love"	Harold Dorman	2:18
8.	"I Found You Just In Time"	Billy Sherrill, Glenn Sutton	2:08
9.	"I'm the One Who Taught You How"	Chip Taylor	2:20
10.	"Almost In Paradise"	Kenny Young, Artie Resnick	2:37
11.	"That Empty Feeling"	Ronnie Dove	2:20

== Charts ==
Chart (1966)	Peak position
US Billboard Top LPs	122
