= I'll Make All Your Dreams Come True =

Studio album by Ronnie Dove
- Released: 1965
- Studio: Fred Foster Sound Studio, Nashville, Tennessee
- Genre: Pop
- Label: Diamond
- Producer: Phil Kahl, Ray Vernon

Ronnie Dove chronology
One Kiss for Old Times' Sake (1965)	I'll Make All Your Dreams Come True (1965)	The Best of Ronnie Dove (1966)

I'll Make All Your Dreams Come True is Ronnie Dove's third album for Diamond Records.

== History ==
The title track peaked at #21 on the Hot 100 chart and #2 on the Easy Listening chart. The other single from the album, Kiss Away, peaked at #25 on the Hot 100 and #5 on the Easy Listening chart.

One song on the album, Put My Mind At Ease, was written and produced by Neil Diamond. It would later appear as a B-side to Dove's single My Babe in 1967. My Babe was also written and produced by Diamond.

The original 1965 release was issued in both stereo and mono. The album was reissued on CD in the mid 1990s, being paired with Dove’s One Kiss for Old Times' Sake album. More recently, the album was reissued digitally by Ronnie Dove Music, with three songs sourced from newly available tapes that were previously unavailable.

== Track listing ==
Track	Title	Songwriter(s)	Time
A1	Wish I Didn't Have a Heart	Art Wayne	2:06
A2	I Have Something to Give You	Dee Moeller	2:35
A3	In a Million Different Ways	Billy Sherrill, Glenn Sutton	2:24
A4	The Minute You're Gone	Jimmy Gately	2:46
A5	I'm Learning How to Smile Again	Ben Raleigh	2:38
A6	Kiss Away	Billy Sherrill, Glenn Sutton	2:37
B1	I Think It's Gonna Rain	Howard Greenfield, Jack Keller	2:06
B2	Put My Mind at Ease	Neil Diamond	2:38
B3	They Can't Love Like You and Me	Dale Ward, Ronnie Dove, Johnny Gillespie	3:22
B4	How I Wish the Nights Were Longer	Joe Levine	2:18
B5	I'll Make All Your Dreams Come True	Bernice Ross, Wes Farrell	2:29
