= The Big Beat (Johnnie Ray album) =

Studio album by Johnnie Ray
- Released: February 1957
- Recorded: November 15–21, 1956
- Genre: Traditional pop; rhythm & blues
- Label: Columbia

Johnnie Ray chronology
I Cry For You (1955)	The Big Beat (1957)	At the Desert Inn in Las Vegas (1958)

The Big Beat is the third studio album by singer Johnnie Ray, released on Columbia Records in 1957. Its catalogue number is CL 961.

== Track listing ==
No.	Title	Writer(s)	Length
1.	"Pretty-Eyed Baby"	M.L. Williams; B. Johnson	2:30
2.	"How Long Blues"	Leroy Carr; Scrapper Blackwell	2:38
3.	"Sent for You Yesterday (And Here You Come Today)"	Count Basie - Eddie Durham - Jimmy Rushing	2:36
4.	"I'll Never Be Free"	Bennie Benjamin; George Weiss	3:22
5.	"I'm Gonna Move to the Outskirts of Town"	Bill Weldon	2:59
6.	"Shake a Hand"	Joe Morris	2:59
7.	"Lotus Blossom"	Sam Coslow; Arthur Johnston	4:05
8.	"Every Day"	Memphis Slim	3:09
9.	"I Want To Be Loved"	Savannah Churchill	2:38
10.	"I Miss You So"	Jimmy Henderson - Sydney Robin - Bertha Scott	3:13
11.	"Trouble in Mind"	Richard Jones	4:56
12.	"So Long"	Remus Harris - Irving Melsher - Russ Morgan	3:00

== Personnel ==
- Johnnie Ray – vocals
- Ray Conniff – arrangements (1 to 6)
- Ray Ellis – arrangements (7 to 12)
- Hal Reiff – photography
