= Cry (Churchill Kohlman song) =

1951 popular song written by Churchill Kohlman

Single by Johnnie Ray

from the album Cry
- B-side: "The Little White Cloud That Cried"
- Released: October 1951
- Recorded: October 16, 1951
- Studio: Columbia 30th Street (New York City)
- Genre: Traditional pop
- Length: 3:02
- Label: Okeh
- Songwriter: Churchill Kohlman
- Producer: Mitch Miller

Johnnie Ray singles chronology
"Whiskey And Gin" (1951)	"Cry" (1951)	"Please, Mr. Sun" (1951)

"Cry" is a 1951 popular song written by Churchill Kohlman. It was first recorded by Ruth Casey on the Cadillac label. The biggest hit version was recorded in New York City by Johnnie Ray and The Four Lads on October 16, 1951. Singer Ronnie Dove also had a big hit with the song in 1966.

== Johnnie Ray & The Four Lads version ==
Johnnie Ray recorded the song at Columbia's 30th Street Studio in New York City, with his version being released on Columbia Records subsidiary label Okeh Records as catalog number Okeh 6840. It was a No. 1 hit on the Billboard magazine chart that year, and one side of one of the biggest two-sided hits, as the flip side, "The Little White Cloud That Cried," reached No.2 on the Billboard chart. This recording also hit No. 1 on the R&B Best Sellers lists and the flip side, "The Little White Cloud That Cried," peaked at No. 6. When the single started to crack the charts it was released on Columbia Records catalog number Co 39659.

Stan Freberg satirized this song, under the title "Try", and reported getting more angry feedback than from any of his many other parodies.

== Ronnie Dove version ==
"Cry"

Single by Ronnie Dove

from the album Cry
- B-side: "Autumn Rhapsody"
- Released: Nov. 1966 (U.S.)
- Recorded: 1966
- Genre: Pop
- Length: 3:16
- Label: Diamond
- Songwriter: Churchill Kohlman
- Producers: Phil Kahl, Ray Vernon

Ronnie Dove singles chronology
"I Really Don't Want To Know" (1966)	"Cry" (1966)	"One More Mountain to Climb" (1967)

Ronnie Dove had a hit with the song in 1966. Released in November, it would reach the Top 20 on both the Pop and Easy Listening Charts by the end of the year. He would go on to perform it on The Ed Sullivan Show early the following year. This would be Dove's last Top 40 hit, although he would continue to chart on the Easy Listening and, later, country charts.

=== Chart history ===
Chart (1966)	Peak position
Canada (RPM) Top Singles	11
US Billboard Hot 100	18
US Adult Contemporary (Billboard)	16

== Lynn Anderson version ==
"Cry"

Single by Lynn Anderson

from the album Cry
- B-side: "Simple Words"
- Released: January 1972 (U.S.)
- Recorded: 1971
- Genre: Country
- Length: 3:10
- Label: Columbia
- Songwriter: Churchill Kohlman

Lynn Anderson singles chronology
"How Can I Unlove You" (1971)	"Cry" (1972)	"Listen to a Country Song" (1972)

Lynn Anderson had major success in the country music market with her 1972 version, released on Columbia Records, which hit No.1 on the Cashbox country charts, and No. 3 on the Billboard magazine Hot Country Singles chart. It also charted in the Top 20 on the U.S. Adult Contemporary Charts.

=== Chart history ===
Chart (1972)	Peak position
US Hot Country Songs (Billboard)	3
US Billboard Hot 100	71
US Adult Contemporary (Billboard)	16
Canadian RPM Country Tracks	1
Canadian RPM Top Singles	77
Canadian RPM Adult Contemporary Tracks	9

=== Year-end charts ===
Chart (1972)	Position
US Hot Country Songs (Billboard)	25

== Crystal Gayle version ==
"Cry"

Single by Crystal Gayle

from the album Straight to the Heart
- B-side: "Crazy in the Heart"
- Released: July 1986 (U.S.)
- Recorded: 1986
- Genre: Country
- Length: 4:18
- Label: Warner Bros.
- Songwriter: Churchill Kohlman
- Producer: Jim Ed Norman

Crystal Gayle singles chronology
"Makin' Up for Lost Time (The Dallas Lovers Song)" (1985)	"Cry" (1986)	"Straight to the Heart" (1986)

Crystal Gayle had her own hit take on the song in 1986, taking it to No. 1 on the Billboard magazine Hot Country Singles chart.

=== Chart history ===
Chart (1986)	Peak position
US Hot Country Songs (Billboard)	1
Canadian RPM Country Tracks	1

== Dutch-language versions ==
In 1982, singer/comedian André van Duin recorded it as "Als je huilt" (a double A-side with his take on Edith Piaf's "Les Trois Cloches") which became a No.1 hit in the Dutch Top 40 by mid-August. During TV-promotion he wore specially designed specs with an in-built water-sprayer for audience-exposure.

== Other versions ==
- Donna Hightower - on her 1951 debut Decca recording, issued as "Little" Donna Hightower.
- Stan Freberg parodied Johnnie Ray's version of "Cry" entitled "Try" in 1952, in which he did an emotional "sobbing out of tune" performance with different lyrics. The lyrics include the title of the B-side song "The Little White Cloud That Cried", in the line "even little white clouds do it". Johnnie Ray was not initially pleased with this parody. However, he later accepted Freberg's version. It peaked at No. 15 on the Billboard Disc Jockeys chart.
- Connie Francis - for her 1959 (cancelled) One for the Boys album, and later for her 1981 I'm Me Again – Silver Anniversary Album.
- Roy Orbison - for his 1961 album Lonely and Blue.
- Brenda Lee - for her 1961 album Emotions.
- Gene McDaniels - in 1961, for his album 100 Lbs. of Clay!
- Timi Yuro - in 1961, for her album Hurt!
- Paul Anka recorded the song as a B-side of "I'm Coming Home" in 1962 on ABC-Paramount 45–10338.
- Lesley Gore - on her 1963 debut album I'll Cry If I Want To.
- Ray Charles - on his 1964 album Sweet & Sour Tears. (No.44 Canada)
- Tammy Wynette - on her 1968 album, Take Me to Your World / I Don't Wanna Play House.
- Mina - on her 1968 live album Mina alla Bussola dal vivo.
- Diana Trask took a version to No.99 on the country singles charts in 1975.
- Kevin Coyne included a cover of the song on his 1978 album, Dynamite Daze.
- Willie Nelson - on his 1984 album City of New Orleans.
- David Cassidy included it on his 2002 album Then and Now.
- Liza Minnelli - on her 2002 CD Liza's Back.
- Eros and the Eschaton recorded a version for Bar None Records in 2014.
- Lorrie Morgan - for her 2009 A Moment in Time album.
