= Hello Pretty Girl =

Single by Ronnie Dove

from the album Right or Wrong
- B-side: "Keep It a Secret"
- Released: December 1964
- Recorded: 1964
- Genre: Pop
- Length: 2:30
- Label: Diamond
- Songwriters: Tommy Boyce, Wes Farrell
- Producers: Phil Kahl, Ray Vernon

Ronnie Dove singles chronology
| "Right or Wrong" (1964) | "Hello Pretty Girl" (1964) | "One Kiss for Old Times' Sake" (1965) |

"Hello Pretty Girl" is Ronnie Dove's fourth single for Diamond Records, and his third chart hit.

Written by Tommy Boyce and Wes Farrell, it peaked at number 54 on the Billboard Pop Singles chart. In January 1965, Dove performed the song on Dick Clark's American Bandstand.

== Chart performance ==
| Chart (1965) | Peak position |
|---|---|
| Canada CHUM Chart | 19 |
| U.S. Billboard Hot 100 | 54 |
