= Johnnie's Comin' Home =

Song performed by Johnnie Ray

"Johnnie's Comin' Home" was a minor hit song for early rock and roll singer Johnnie Ray. The song was written by Tin Pan Alley songwriter Al Sherman and Wayne Shanklin, and was released in 1954. On November 12, 1955 it entered Billboard′s Top 100 for one week and peaked at number 100, giving it the distinction of being the number 100 entry on Billboard′s first Top 100 chart.

== Chart performance ==
Chart (1955)	Peak position
U.S. Billboard Top 100 Tracks	100
