= Right or Wrong (Ronnie Dove album) =

Studio album by Ronnie Dove
- Released: 1964
- Genre: Pop, doo-wop
- Label: Diamond
- Producer: Phil Kahl, Ray Vernon

Ronnie Dove chronology
Right or Wrong (1964)	One Kiss for Old Times' Sake (1965)

Right or Wrong is the debut album from pop singer Ronnie Dove.

== History ==
The album's title shares that of his third Diamond Records single, originally country hit written and performed by Wanda Jackson. The album also includes his first single on Diamond, "Sweeter Than Sugar", and its B-Side "I Believe in You". The single debuted in April 1964, but failed to chart nationally. It did, however, chart on a few local surveys. The two songs were written by Link Wray (using his father's name as a pseudonym). The album also includes Dove's first Top 40 hit Say You, which reached #40 nationally, and reached #1 on Top 40 powerhouse CKLW.

The album also features future single Hello Pretty Girl as its lead off track.

The original 1964 issue of the album was released in both mono and stereo. The album has been reissued digitally by Ronnie Dove Music.

== Cover art ==
The cover art of this album is almost an exact replica of Dion's Ruby Baby album from the previous year, released by Columbia Records.

== Track listing ==
Track	Title	Songwriter(s)	Time
A1	Hello Pretty Girl	Tommy Boyce, Wes Farrell	2:20
A2	There's No One Out There For Me	J. B. Hicks	2:21
A3	To Each His Own	Jay Livingston, R. Evans	2:04
A4	Baby, Put Your Arms Around Me	Artie Resnick, Kenny Young	2:27
A5	No Greater Love	Ronnie Dove	2:22
A6	Right or Wrong	Wanda Jackson	2:06
B1	I'll String Along With You	Al Dubin, Harry Warren	2:30
B2	Keep It a Secret	Jesse Mae Robinson	2:30
B3	Bluebird	Roy Alfred, Wes Farrell	2:30
B4	I Believed In You	F. L. Wray, Sr.	2:15
B5	Sweeter Than Sugar	F. L. Wray, Sr.	2:10
B6	Say You	J. B. Hicks	2:22
