= I Cry for You =

1955 studio album by Johnnie Ray

I Cry For You

Studio album by Johnnie Ray
- Released: 1955
- Genre: Traditional pop; jazz
- Label: Columbia

Johnnie Ray chronology
Johnnie Ray (1952)	I Cry For You (1955)	The Big Beat (1957)

I Cry For You is the second studio album by Johnnie Ray, released on Columbia Records, after his self-titled debut album. It was released in the United States in 1955 as a 10" LP. It would also receive a release in Australia by Coronet in 1957. The album's Columbia Records catalogue number is CL 2510. The album was released as part of the label's House Party series.

== Track listing ==
No.	Title	Writer(s)	Length
1.	"Please, Mr. Sun"	Ramón Getzov; Sid Frank
2.	"If Only I Could Tell The Lady I Said Goodbye"	Johnnie Ray
3.	"Somebody Stole My Gal"	Leo Wood
4.	"Nobody's Sweetheart"	Bill Meyers; Elmer Schoebel; Ernie Erdman; Gus Kahn
5.	"(Here Am I) Broken Hearted"	Buddy DeSylva; Lew Brown; Ray Henderson
6.	"All of Me"	Gerald Marks; Seymour Simon

== Personnel ==
- Johnnie Ray – vocals
