= Let's Start All Over Again =

"Let’s Start All Over Again"

Single by Ronnie Dove

from the album Ronnie Dove Sings the Hits for You
- B-side: "That Empty Feeling"
- Released: March 1966
- Recorded: 1966
- Genre: Pop
- Length: 2:30
- Label: Diamond
- Composers: Al Kasha, Joel Hirschhorn
- Producers: Phil Kahl, Ray Vernon

Ronnie Dove singles chronology
"When Liking Turns To Loving" (1966)	"Let’s Start All Over Again" (1966)	"Happy Summer Days" (1966)

"Let's Start All Over Again" is a 1966 pop single recorded by singer Ronnie Dove for the Diamond Records label.

== Background ==
The song was Dove's ninth hit single for the Diamond label. It made the Billboard Top 20 pop singles chart, and peaked at number 34 on the Easy Listening chart in 1966.

It is not to be confused with a different song of the same name, recorded by The Paragons and The Jesters.

== Chart performance ==
Chart (1966)	Peak position
Canada (RPM) Top Singles	13
U.S. Billboard Hot 100	20
U.S. Billboard Easy Listening	34
