= Right or Wrong (Wanda Jackson song) =

1961 single by Wanda Jackson

Single by Wanda Jackson

from the album Right or Wrong
- B-side: "Funnel of Love"
- Released: April 1961
- Recorded: October 28, 1960; Nashville, Tennessee, U.S.
- Genre: Country, Nashville Sound
- Label: Capitol
- Songwriter: Wanda Jackson
- Producer: Ken Nelson

Wanda Jackson singles chronology
"Little Charm Bracelet" (1961)	"Right or Wrong" (1961)	"In the Middle of a Heartache" (1961)

"Right or Wrong" or "Right or Wrong (I'll Be with You)" is a song written and originally recorded by Wanda Jackson, an American country, rock, and Christian music artist. Originally, the song was a major country and pop hit for Jackson in 1961. A second version was released in 1964 that became popular by American pop artist, Ronnie Dove.

== Wanda Jackson version ==
The song was recorded at the Bradley Film and Recording Studio on October 28, 1960, in Nashville, Tennessee, United States and was produced by Ken Nelson. It was one of Jackson's first recording sessions in Nashville. "Right or Wrong" was officially issued as a single in April 1961, peaking at number nine on the Billboard Magazine Hot Country and Western Sides chart. It also reached number twenty nine on the Billboard Hot 100, becoming her second top-forty single on that list. Thirdly, the single peaked at number nine on the Billboard Hot Adult Contemporary Tracks chart, her first entry on to the chart. "Right or Wrong" became the second top-ten country single of Jackson's career.

"Right or Wrong" is associated with Wanda Jackson's "comeback" into mainstream country music. After a series of rock and roll-styled singles during the late 1950s, Jackson ultimately reverted to country and claimed to have lost her "rock" audience. She explained her reasoning to this switch in the book, Finding Her Voice: Women in Country Music, stating, "Then country music began comin' back, and I had written a ballad called 'Right or Wrong' and it became a big hit...I think that when I went back to country I lost my rock and roll fans."

=== Charts ===
Chart (1961)	Peak position
Australia Top 100 Singles (Kent Music Report)	33
US Billboard Hot 100	29
US Adult Contemporary (Billboard)	9
US Hot Country Songs (Billboard)	9

== Ronnie Dove version ==
"Right or Wrong"

Single by Ronnie Dove

from the album Right or Wrong
- B-side: "Baby, Put Your Arms Around Me"
- Released: October 1964
- Recorded: September 1964; Nashville, Tennessee, U.S.
- Genre: Pop
- Label: Diamond
- Lyricist: Wanda Jackson
- Producers: Phil Kahl, Ray Vernon

Ronnie Dove singles chronology
"Say You" (1964)	"Right or Wrong" (1964)	"Hello Pretty Girl" (1964)

In 1964, American performer Ronnie Dove recorded a cover of Jackson's composition. The song was recorded at the RCA Studio B in Nashville, Tennessee, United States, in September 1964.

According to Ronnie, Elvis Presley sat in on the session and advised him to add the high note at the end of the song.

Dove's version was officially released as a single in October 1964 and it peaked at number fourteen on the Billboard Hot 100. The song became Dove's first major hit as a recording artist, leading to a string of successful top-twenty hits on the Hot 100 during the 1960s.

The song also became a surprise R&B hit, making it in the top five of Cashbox's R&B chart. It was his only charting record on the R&B chart.

He re-recorded the song in 1976 for Melodyland Records.

=== Charts ===
Chart (1964)	Peak position
Canada RPM	25
U.S. Billboard Hot 100	14
U.S. Cashbox R&B	4
