= I Really Don't Want to Know =

1953 song by Don Robertson and Howard Barnes

"I Really Don't Want to Know" is a popular song written by Don Robertson (music) and Howard Barnes (lyrics). The song was published in 1953.

The best-known version of the song was recorded by Les Paul and Mary Ford in 1953, one of the top 100 songs of 1954, reaching No. 11 in the charts.

== Ronnie Dove version ==
"I Really Don't Want to Know"

Single by Tommy Edwards
- B-side: "Unloved"
- Released: May 1960
- Recorded: 1960
- Genre: R&B
- Length: 2:15
- Label: MGM
- Songwriters: Barnes, Robertson

Tommy Edwards singles chronology
"Don't Fence Me In" (1960)	"I Really Don't Want to Know" (1960)	"It's Not The End of Everything" (1960)

"I Really Don't Want to Know"

Single by Ronnie Dove

from the album Ronnie Dove Sings the Hits for You
- B-side: "Years of Tears"
- Released: August 1966
- Recorded: 1966
- Genre: Pop
- Length: 2:49
- Label: Diamond
- Songwriters: H. Barnes, D. Robertson
- Producer: Phil Kahl

Ronnie Dove singles chronology
"Happy Summer Days" (1966)	"I Really Don't Want to Know" (1966)	"Cry" (1966)

Ronnie Dove recorded the song on Diamond Records in the summer of 1966. It peaked at number 22 on the Billboard Hot 100 and number 12 on the Billboard Easy Listening chart.

=== Chart positions ===
Chart (1966)	Peak position
Canada (RPM) Top Singles	18
US Billboard Hot 100	22
US Adult Contemporary (Billboard)	12

== Elvis Presley version ==
Elvis Presley - as a single and on his album Elvis Country (I'm 10,000 Years Old) (recorded 1970, released 1971). Presley's cover became a gold record. The first two verses were sung during every show of Elvis's final concert tour in June of 1977. It was played during the introduction of his piano player, Tony Brown.

Chart (1970)	Peak position
U.S. Billboard Hot 100	21
U.S. Billboard Hot Country Singles	23
U.S. Billboard Easy Listening	2
Canadian RPM Top Singles	9
Canadian RPM Adult Contemporary	7

"I Really Don't Want to Know"

Single by Elvis Presley

from the album Elvis Country
- A-side: "I Really Don't Want To Know"
- B-side: "There Goes My Everything"
- Released: December 8, 1970
- Recorded: June 7, 1970
- Studio: RCA Studio B, Nashville
- Genre: Country
- Label: RCA Victor
- Songwriters: Howard Barnes, Don Robertson
- Producer: Felton Jarvis

Elvis Presley singles chronology
"You Don't Have to Say You Love Me" (1970)	"I Really Don't Want to Know" / "There Goes My Everything" (1970)	"Rags to Riches" (1971)

== Other recordings ==
- Tommy Edwards's version hit the pop top 20 in 1960, peaking at No. 18.
- Eddy Arnold's version was a number one country song in 1954, and was on his album You Gotta Have Love (1960).
- Johnny Burnette – for his album Dreamin (1960)
- Solomon Burke – a single release. (1962).
- Andy Williams released a version on his 1963 album, Days of Wine and Roses and Other TV Requests.
- Connie Francis – for her album Country Music – Connie Style (1962).
- Kay Starr – for the album Just Plain Country (1962).
- Al Martino – for his album I Love You Because (1963).
- Esther Phillips – for her album Release Me (1963).
- Rosemary Clooney – Rosemary Clooney Sings Country Hits from the Heart (1963)
- Eydie Gormé – for her album Gormé Country Style (1964).
- Gene Pitney – on the album George Jones & Gene Pitney – For the First Time! Two Great Stars (1965)
- Perry Como – The Scene Changes (1965)
- Vic Damone – in his album Country Love Songs (1965).
- Brook Benton – in the album My Country (1966).
- Loretta Lynn – in her album Don't Come Home a Drinkin' (With Lovin' on Your Mind) (1967).
- Chen Fen Lan, a Taiwanese singer, included it in her LP album Golden Record in (1970).
- Gene Clark on his album Roadmaster (first released in 1973).
- Johnny Rodriguez included some Spanish language lyrics in his version. (1973).
- Dolly Parton and Willie Nelson - included in the album Burlap & Satin (1983)
- Jason & the Scorchers offered an alt country version on their 1985 album Lost and Found.
- Anne Murray's tribute-to-the-1950s album, Croonin' (1993).
- Jerry Lee Lewis included it on his 2010 album, "Mean Old Man".
- Knud Pfeiffer wrote the Danish lyrics. The Danish title is "Jeg ønsker ikke dit svar". Raquel Rastenni with Harry Felbert's sixtet and chorus recorded it in Copenhagen in 1954. The song was released on His Master's Voice X 8219.
- A Japanese version was sung by Yōichi Sugawara (菅原洋一) as "Shiritakunai no" (知りたくないの) in 1965.
- This song was covered in Mandarin Chinese language, given the title name of 過去的春夢 (Passed Memory) with Chinese lyrics written by Li Rui Cheng (李瑞成), recorded by various female and male singers, such as Rou Yun (柔雲) in 1956, Judi Jim (詹小屏) in 1973 from Hong Kong; Zi Wei (紫薇) in 1969, Bao Na-Na (包娜娜) in 1976, Feng Fei-fei & Yao Su-Rong (姚蘇蓉) both in 1978, Long Piao-Piao (龍飄飄), Yu Ya (尤雅) in 2002 from Taiwan, and Ling Seow (凌霄) from Singapore.

== Answer song ==
- "I Really Want You to Know" by Skeeter Davis was released by RCA in 1961 as an answer song to Eddy Arnold's version of the song.

== Popular culture ==
- John Travolta sang the song in the 2004 film A Love Song for Bobby Long.
