= Please, Mr. Sun =

1959 single by Johnnie Ray

Single by Johnnie Ray

from the album I Cry for You
- B-side: "Here I Am - Broken Hearted"
- Released: December 28, 1951
- Genre: Pop
- Length: 2:58
- Label: Columbia
- Songwriters: Ray Getzov, Sid Frank

Johnnie Ray singles chronology
"Cry" (1951)	"Please, Mr. Sun" (1951)	"Mountains in the Moonlight" (1952)

"Please Mr. Sun"

Single by Tommy Edwards
- B-side: "Morning Side of the Mountain"
- Released: January 1959
- Recorded: 1958
- Genre: R&B
- Length: 2:20
- Label: MGM
- Songwriters: Ray Getzov, Sid Frank

Tommy Edwards singles chronology
"Love Is All We Need" (1958)	"Please Mr. Sun" (1959)	"Morning Side of the Mountain" (1959)

"Please, Mr. Sun" is a song written by Ray Getzov and Sid Frank and performed by Johnnie Ray featuring The Four Lads and the Jimmy Carroll Orchestra. It reached number 6 on the U.S. pop chart in 1952. It was featured on his 1955 album I Cry for You.

The single ranked number 30 on Billboard's Year-End top 30 singles of 1952.

== Other charting versions ==
- Perry Como released a version of the song as a single in 1952 which reached number 12 on the U.S. pop chart.
- Tommy Edwards released a version of the song as a single in 1952 which reached number 18 on the U.S. R&B chart and number 22 on the U.S. pop chart.
- Edwards released a new version of the song as a single in 1959 which reached number 11 on the U.S. pop chart.
- The Vogues released a version of the song as a single in 1966 which reached number 48 on the U.S. pop chart.

== Other versions ==
- Les Baxter with His Chorus and Orchestra released a version of the song as the B-side to their 1952 single "Blue Tango".
- Frankie Carle released a version of the song on his 1952 album, Top Pops.
- Lynn Hope and His Orchestra released a version of the song as the B-side to their 1952 single "Hope, Skip, and Jump".
- Bill Kenny released a version of the song as the B-side to his 1952 single "If I Forget You".
- The Innocents released a version of the song as the B-side to their 1960 single "Gee Whiz".
- Johnny Crawford released a version of the song on his 1962 album, The Captivating Johnny Crawford.
- Paul Petersen released a version of the song as the B-side to his 1962 single "Lollipops and Roses".
- Keely Smith released a version of the song on her 1962 album, Because You're Mine.
- Joe Bataan released a version of the song on his 1972 album, Sweet Soul.
- Doris Day released a version of the song on her 1995 compilation album, The Uncollected Doris Day with the Page Cavanaugh Trio, Vol. 2: Wonderful!
- Bing Crosby released a version of the song on his posthumous 1998 album, Lonely Street. This was taken from a 1952 radio broadcast.
