= Happy Summer Days =

Single by Ronnie Dove

from the album Ronnie Dove Sings the Hits for You
- B-side: "Long After"
- Released: June 1966
- Recorded: 1966
- Genre: Pop
- Length: 2:08
- Label: Diamond
- Songwriters: Larry Kusik, Ritchie Adams, Wes Farrell
- Producers: Phil Kahl, Ray Vernon

Ronnie Dove singles chronology
"Let's Start All Over Again" (1966)	"Happy Summer Days" (1966)	"I Really Don't Want to Know" (1966)

"Happy Summer Days" is a 1966 pop single by Ronnie Dove.

== Background ==
The single was Dove's 10th charting single for the Diamond label. It was the only Dove single to be released with a picture sleeve.

== Chart positions ==
"Happy Summer Days" peaked at number 27 on the Billboard Pop Singles chart in 1966. It did considerably better on the Easy Listening Charts, peaking at #7. It was featured on his Ronnie Dove Sings the Hits for You album.

Chart (1966)	Peak position
Canada (RPM) Top Singles	26
US Billboard Hot 100	27
US Adult Contemporary (Billboard)	7

== Popular culture ==
- In 2019, the song was featured in an Amazon commercial.
