= Don Varner =

American singer-songwriter

Don Wilson Varner
- Born: Birmingham, Alabama
- Died: 2002; Moreno Valley, California

Don Wilson Varner (25 June 1943 – 7 October 2002) was an American soul singer. Varner was a baritone who sang uptempo soul (later appreciated by Northern soul fans) and ballads.

== Career ==
Born in Birmingham, Alabama, Varner grew up in the same neighborhood as Eddie Kendricks, co-founder of The Temptations. Varner moved to Chicago after high school to pursue his music career but returned to Alabama after six years to record at Rick Hall's FAME Studios in Muscle Shoals. He wrote songs including "I Keep Holdin' On" for Sam & Dave (with William Crump). Varner also worked with Quin Ivy in Sheffield, Alabama and released several songs including "Masquerade"(1967), "Down in Texas"(1967), and "Tear Stained Face" on the South Camp and Quinvy labels.

Varner did not release many recordings but performed numerous live shows in the South with other major soul performers. He moved to California in the 1980s and toured as the lead singer of the Johnny Otis Show. He toured numerous European music festivals in 1985. In his later career, he began to record gospel music. He died in Moreno Valley, California in 2002 of a heart attack at the age of 59. An album of his music from 1968 to 1974 entitled Finally Go Over! was released posthumously.
