= Brother Dave Gardner =

American drummer

David Gardner (June 11, 1926 – September 22, 1983), known as Brother Dave Gardner, was an American comedian, professional drummer and singer.

A Tennessee native, Gardner studied drumming, beginning at age 13. After a one-semester term as a Southern Baptist ministerial student at Union University in his hometown of Jackson, Tennessee, he began a musical career as a drummer and occasional vocalist. After a pair of demo singles for Decca Records around 1956, he had a 1957 Top-20 hit on OJ Records with "White Silver Sands".

It was his comedic routines between songs, however, that brought him to the attention of RCA Records artist and producer Chet Atkins. The eventual result was a comedy album interspersed with a couple of songs – Rejoice, Dear Hearts! (1959), which propelled Brother Dave into the national eye, along with the first of several appearances on national television talk/variety shows such as The Tonight Show.

An arrest for marijuana possession in 1962 curtailed his visibility on television. Then, it seemed, changing public tastes (i.e., the falling out-of-favor of 'beatnik'-style comedy), coupled with Gardner's holding onto his same performing style, resulted in a similar fading of his recording career. After six albums for RCA Victor Records, he made two for Capitol Records, and then others for lesser labels. He had another legal problem over tax-evasion charges in the 1970s, which his son helped clear up.

Brother Dave had a role as a Southern preacher in the 1978 made-for-TV film Big Bob Johnson's Fantastic Speed Circus.

Gardner was twice married: his first wife, Millie, preceded him in death, and he was married to his second wife, Judy, at the time of his death. He had two children from his first marriage — son Dave II (died 1999) and daughter Candace.

== Brother Dave's comedic style ==
During his brief time as a star among America's socially-aware stand-up comedians of the late 1950s and early 1960s, Brother Dave successfully fused a stream-of-consciousness style of addressing subjects (e.g., Lord Buckley, Jean Shepherd) with a classic Southern 'storyteller/liars'-bench' manner (e.g., Andy Griffith, and the later Justin Wilson and Jerry Clower), setting himself apart a bit from Northern Jewish contemporaries such as Mort Sahl, Lenny Bruce, and Shelley Berman. His "stream of consciousness" style got him in trouble in 1963 when he was booked by Baylor University student Rod Phelps to perform on campus. His line that went something like "I was in World War Two and I saw lots of blood spilled but it never sent anyone to Heaven" caused the audience to leave in droves. The Baylor President called Phelps into his office the next day and handed Rod a handful of telegrams complaining about Gardner's performance. Phelps had to write each sender and apologize for the remark. He had succeeded in getting Baylor to book Brother Dave because Gardner's uncle was a pastor who had developed the Sunday evening "Training Union" program then widely used in Southern Baptist churches.

Phelps went on to become an entertainment attorney and booked Brother Dave into a number of small town venues, including Temple, Texas, where the audience consisted of a number of President Lyndon Johnson's relatives. Gardner went off on then President Johnson and Phelps had to refund a number of patrons.

Phelps produced Brother Dave's last live concert on December 19, 1979, at Panther Hall in Fort Worth, Texas.

In the early 1980s, Texas oilman H.L. Hunt moved Brother Dave and wife Millie to Dallas, because of Gardner's proclivity to be a staunch conservative, and to not be afraid to "tell it like it was." Hunt soon became disenchanted with Gardner's alcohol and drug abuse and cut Brother Dave off.

Gardner mixed thought-provoking or confounding stand-alone one-liners, or 'zingers' (e.g., "An' I'm writin' a new book an' it's gonna be called "What Will the Preachers Do When the Devil is Saved?"", "Gratitude is riches, and complaint is poverty, and the worst I ever had was wonderful!", "Let them that don't want none, have memories of not gettin' any... let that not be their punishment, but their reward," and "Don'tcha know a diamond ain't nothin' but a piece o' coal that's stuck with it?") with satirical musings on his contemporary political scene ("...folks used to pray to God for rain, and now they call Washington", "Say, a Democrat is somebody who expects somethin' fer nothin', and a Republican is somebody who expects nothin' fer somethin', an' a Independent is a cat that greases his own car," and "If I were bound by either party, well then, I might ferget America,"). He also told traditional, humorous Southern stories, the most notable among these being "The Motorcycle Story", "When John Gets Here" (also called "The Haunted House"), and his version of Shakespeare's Julius Caesar as set in Rome, Georgia.

Brother Dave got a good deal of comic mileage from his boosting of all things Southern, making him a latter-day version of Kenny Delmar's "Senator Claghorn" on Fred Allen's classic radio show. He smoked cigarettes during his routines, describing them as "a Southern product," and declaring "I like cigarettes – I'd smoke chains if I could light 'em." He spoke of a Southerner's culinary fondness for "a Moon Pie and an Ar-uh-Cee (R.C. Cola)." Anticipating the bottled-water market by almost 30 years, he remarked that, at Hot Springs, Arkansas, he had seen "some o' them ignorant, stupid Southerners sellin' water to them brilliant Yankees." He noted that the difference between a Northern Baptist and a Southern Baptist was that a Northern Baptist said, "There ain't no Hell," and a Southern Baptist said, "The hell there ain't."

While Gardner did spin routines based on a wide-ranging social freedom, some of his material did play off racial stereotypes of his time. Often, he had African-American characters in his routines speak with an exaggerated, high-pitched, Butterfly McQueen-style accent [and in style of Flip Wilson], as in "The Motorcycle Story." In another of his routines, a black woman exclaimed, "James Lewis, git away from dat wheelbarrow – say, you know you doesn't know nothin' 'bout machin'ry!" Although Gardner's early-1960s albums for RCA Victor contained questionable racial humor, there is nothing like the overtly racist content of his late-1960s act.

== Death ==
After his popularity declined in the late 1960s, newspapers noted that he turned to drugs and alcohol, and began having health problems. He started a comeback in 1980, mostly speaking at college campuses. But he suffered a mild heart attack in January 1983, and had a pacemaker implanted while in Smyrna, Georgia. The following September, he was on a movie set near Myrtle Beach, South Carolina, working on an Earl Owensby film called Chain Gang, when he had a much bigger heart attack. He had just completed filming that day, and was signing autographs and joking with people when he suddenly went into the studio and said he needed help. He died that night at about 9 p.m. in Grand Strand General Hospital.

== Rediscovery ==
After being out of the national limelight for many years, Brother Dave's contributions to American humor may see a comeback, due to the 2004 one-man play prepared and acted by David Anthony Wright, Rejoice Dear Hearts: An Evening With Brother Dave Gardner.

In addition, his first four albums have been reissued on the Laugh.com label, and his routines can occasionally be heard on Sirius XM satellite radio channels Blue Collar Radio (SiriusXM 97) and Laugh USA (SiriusXM 98).

== Selected discography ==
Year	Album	Chart position	Label
1960	Rejoice, Dear Hearts!	5	RCA Victor
1960	Kick Thy Own Self	5	RCA Victor
1961	Ain't That Weird?	15	RCA Victor
1962	Did You Ever?	49	RCA Victor
1963	All Seriousness Aside	52	RCA Victor
1963	It Don't Make No Difference	28	Capitol
1963	It's Bigger Than Both of Us!		RCA Victor
1964	The Best of Dave Gardner		RCA Victor
1964	It's All in How You Look at "It"		Capitol
1966	Hip-Ocrocy		Tower
1970	Out Front		Tonka
1976	Brother Dave Gardner's New Comedy Album		4 Star
1980	Brother Dave Gardner In Person		Delta
1983	Brother Dave Gardner Live		CMC
