= Kiss Away =

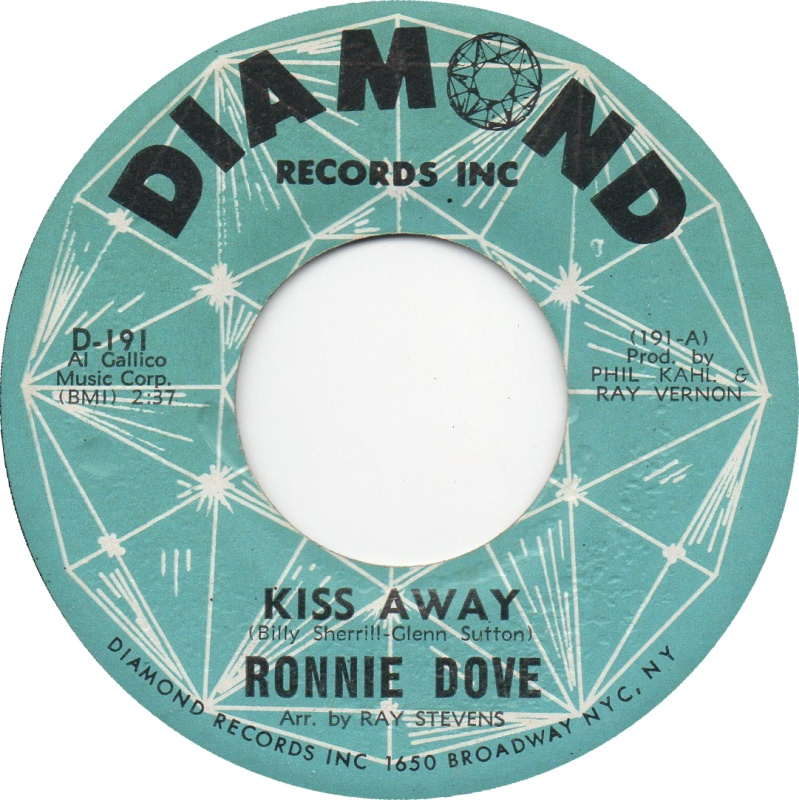

Single by Ronnie Dove

from the album I'll Make All Your Dreams Come True
- B-side: "Where in the World"
- Released: October 1965
- Recorded: 1965
- Genre: Pop
- Label: Diamond
- Lyricists: Billy Sherrill, Glenn Sutton
- Producers: Phil Kahl, Ray Vernon

Ronnie Dove singles chronology
"I’ll Make All Your Dreams Come True" (1965)	"Kiss Away" (1965)	"When Liking Turns to Loving" (1966)

"Kiss Away" is the eighth single by pop singer Ronnie Dove in 1965.

Written by Billy Sherrill and Glenn Sutton, it peaked at number 25 on the Billboard Hot 100.

== Chart performance ==
Chart (1965)	Peak position
Canada (CHUM) Top Singles	40
Canada (RPM) AC	13
U.S. Billboard Hot 100	25
U.S. Billboard Easy Listening	5

== Jane Morgan version ==
Jane Morgan also recorded the song on an album for Epic Records. It was also used as the B-side of her cover single of Len Barry's "1-2-3". It reached number 16 on the Billboard Easy Listening chart in 1966.

== Other versions ==
Two years later, Sherrill became Tammy Wynette's producer and she recorded the song on her D-I-V-O-R-C-E album.

The song has also been recorded by David Houston and Brenda Lee.
