= Say You (Ronnie Dove song) =

Single by Ronnie Dove

from the album Right or Wrong
- B-side: "Let Me Stay Today"
- Released: June 1964
- Recorded: 1964
- Genre: Pop
- Length: 2:24
- Label: Diamond
- Composer: J. B. Hicks
- Producers: Phil Kahl, Ray Vernon

Ronnie Dove singles chronology
"Sweeter Than Sugar" (1964)	"Say You" (1964)	"Right or Wrong" (1964)

"Say You" is Ronnie Dove's second single for Diamond Records.

This J. B. Hicks penned track reached number 40 on the Billboard Pop Singles chart in 1964, becoming Dove's first nationally charted single. He went on to have 21 consecutive charting singles. It was included on his debut album Right Or Wrong. Despite its rather modest showing on the Billboard Hot 100, the song made it to number one on Top 40 powerhouse CKLW on August 11, 1964. On Canada's RPM charts it reached number 26.

It was originally recorded by the singer Jamie Coe and released as a single a few years earlier. However, Coe's version did not chart.
