= Straight Skirt =

Single by Gene Summers and His Rebels
- A-side: "Straight Skirt"
- B-side: "School Of Rock 'n Roll"
- Released: 1958
- Recorded: 1958 - Los Angeles
- Genre: Rockabilly
- Length: 1:58
- Label: Jan Records
- Songwriter: Mary Tarver

"Straight Skirt" (later "Straight Skirts") is a song written by Mary Tarver in 1958 and published by Song Productions, BMI the same year. It was originally recorded by Gene Summers and his Rebels, a rockabilly band from Dallas, Texas and was first released in February 1958 by Jan Records #11-100. On March 8, 1958, Cash Box picked it as their 'Sleeper of the Week'. In Billboard 's 'Reviews of Pop Records' they wrote: "The artist is backed by a chorus and cheerful rockabilly support on this blues. The kids might take to this".

"Straight Skirt" was flipped with "School Of Rock 'n Roll", an upbeat rockabilly song written by James McClung who was a high school friend of Summers. McClung was also the original guitarist for The Rebels and would continue to work with Summers well into the mid-1960s.

In the 1970s, at the beginning of the rockabilly revival in Europe, "School Of Rock 'n Roll" and "Straight Skirt" were re-discovered by a new legion of rockabilly fans and bands. Since that time they have become classic dance floor-fillers and renewed Gene's career to the extent of worldwide concert appearances from 1980 onwards.

== Cover versions ==
- Johnny Devlin & His Devils - 7-inch 45 rpm single “Straight Skirt”/”Slipping Around”

Prestige Records #PSP 0066, New Zealand September 1958

- 7-inch 45 rpm EP Johnny Devlin “How Would Ya Be”, “Slipping Around”, “Straight Skirt”, “I’m Grateful”.

Prestige Records PEP 2017, New Zealand October 1958

- Sheet Music Johnny Devlin “Straight Skirt”

Southern Music Publishing Company, New Zealand 1958

- 7-inch 45 rpm EP Johnny Devlin “Rock To Johnny Devlin” “ Slipping

Around,” “ Straight Skirt,” “ I’m Grateful,” “ How Would ‘Ya Be” Bell Records BE-198, Australia 1959

- LP Johnny Devlin “24 Golden Greats”

Music World Records MALPS-536, New Zealand 1972

- CD Johnny Devlin “Whole Lotta Shakin’ Goin’ On”

Festival Records CD 26255, Australia 1998

- CD Johnny Devlin “Lawdy Miss Clawdy-Prestige Years 1958-1959”

Festival Records CD D26481, Australia 2000

- CD Various Artists “The Very Best Of Kiwi Rock & Roll”

EMI Records 5784512, New Zealand 2004 (Johnny Devlin “Straight Skirt” track #2.)

- The Diamonds - 7-inch 45 rpm single “Straight Skirt”/ “Patsy”

Mercury Records # , United States 1958

- 7-inch 45 rpm single The Diamonds “Straight Skirts”/”Patsy”

Mercury PYE 7MT.208, U.K. 1958

- 7-inch 45 rpm EP The Diamonds “Straight Skirts”/”Patsy”

plus The Platters “Winner Take All”/”My Dream” Mercury Records MG 10114, Spain 1959

- LP The Diamonds“America’s Famous Song Stylists”

Mercury Wing Records MGW 12114 (Mono), United States 1959 (Straight Skirts- Side 2, Track 3)

- LP The Diamonds "America’s Famous Song Stylists"

Mercury Wing Records MGW 12114, Canada 1959 (Straight Skirts - Side 2, Track 3)

- LP The Diamonds “The Definitive Collection Of The Diamonds”

Ebenezer Records 01, (country) (year) (Straight Skirts - Side 1, Track 6)

- LP The Diamonds “Best Of The Diamonds”

Rome Records 157, Italy 1990

- CD The Diamonds “Diamonds Collection”

Stardust Records CD 1010, United States 1996

- CD The Diamonds “Little Darlin’-25 Golden Hits”

Remember Records CD RMB 75072, Portugal 1999

- CD The Diamonds "Songbook"

Canetoad Records CTCD-1013, Australia 2007 (Straight Skirt-Track #11)

- Ronnie Dawson - LP Ronnie Dawson “Rockin’ Bones”

No Hit Records LP-001, U.K. 1988

- CD Ronnie Dawson “Rockin’ Bones”

No Hit Records CD-001, U.K. 1993

- CD Ronnie Dawson “Rockin’ Bones The Legendary Masters”

Crystal Clear Sound Records CD CCR 9643-2, United States 1996

- The Sureshots - CD “Rock ‘n Roll Ball” (‘Live from Finland’)

Empire Records EMPCD-105, U.K. 2005

== Sources ==
- Liner notes "The Ultimate School Of Rock & Roll" 1997 United States
- Article and sessionography in issue 15 (1977) of New Kommotion Magazine UK
- Article and sessionography in issue 23 (1980) of New Kommotion Magazine UK
- Feature article and sessionography in issue 74 (1999) of Rockin' Fifties Magazine Germany
- Feature article with photo spread in issue 53 (2000) of Bill Griggs' Rockin' 50s Magazine United States
- Feature Article with photo spread in issue 54 (2000) of Bill Griggs' Rockin' 50s Magazine United States
