= Ronnie Dove =

American pop and country musician (1935–2026)

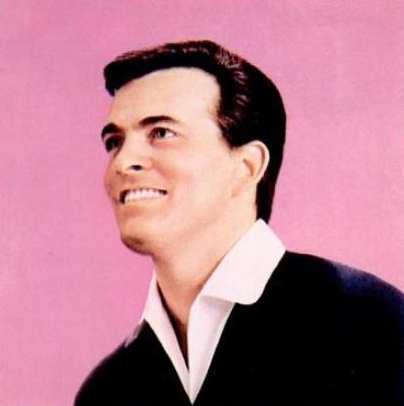
- Dove in 1967

Background information
- Born: Ronald Eugene Dove; September 7, 1935; Herndon, Virginia, U.S.
- Died: September 15, 2026 (aged 91) Pasadena, Maryland, U.S.
- Genres: Pop, country
- Occupations: Singer; songwriter; producer; television host
- Instrument: Vocals
- Years active: 1959–1989, 1991–2023
- Labels: Diamond; Decca; Certron; MCA; Hobby; Melodyland; Wrayco
- Website: http://www.ronniedove.com http://ronniedovemusic.com

Ronald Eugene Dove (September 7, 1935 – September 15, 2026) was an American pop and country music singer who had a string of hit pop records in the mid- to late 1960s, and several country chart records in the 1970s and 1980s.

== Early life ==
Ronnie Dove was born in Herndon, Virginia on September 7, 1935. He was the only son of Fairfax County, Virginia police sergeant Paul S. Dove and his first wife, Catherine Pearl, née Smith Dove Rusk. His older sister is Marjorie L. Forrester.

During his stint in the Coast Guard, Dove began his singing career in the clubs of Baltimore, where he was stationed. He formed a group, the Belltones, and they played Baltimore and the East Coast for four years.

In 1959, they recorded their debut single "Lover Boy" on their own label. In 1961, they released a cover of the Buddy Knox hit "Party Doll" on Decca Records, but it failed to chart. They issued one more single on Jalo Records before the group broke up and Dove went solo.

== Career ==
Dove went solo and signed with Diamond Records in 1964. His debut solo single, "Sweeter Than Sugar", appeared in April 1964 to no national fanfare, though it did appear in some local hit parades. Later that year, Diamond released "Say You", which peaked at position #40 by means of the Billboard hit parade, and became his first national hit parade success. The next single, a cover of Wanda Jackson's "Right Or Wrong," put him into the Top 20. In 1965, he had five chart singles, and after just three albums, Diamond Records released a "best of" collection. Dove's name was featured many times in the Billboard and Cashbox awards in 1965.

More hits came in 1966 and 1967, including "My Babe", "Cry", "Happy Summer Days", and several others.

After releasing his cover of Johnnie Ray's "Cry", Dove appeared on The Ed Sullivan Show to promote the song.

He continued to record for Diamond until it was sold in 1970 to Aubrey Mayhew's Certron Records. There, he recorded a live album and several singles that went unreleased. However, Certron did issue a "Greatest Hits" compilation of his Diamond songs, as well as one unreleased song. The label had money issues from the start, and went bankrupt in 1971.

Shortly thereafter, Dove went to the independent Wrayco Records and released a cover of the Bobby Hebb song "Sunny". The single received no promotion from the label, and subsequently failed to chart.

=== Country music ===
After his stints with Certron and Wrayco, Dove signed a new deal with Decca Records in 1971 and pointed his career in a more country-oriented direction, scoring two minor country chart hits and an album.

Later, he moved to the Motown country label Melodyland and had a top 40 country hit with a cover of Bobby Darin's "Things", which became his highest charting country hit, reaching #25. During this period, he recorded two albums of country music, but neither ended up being released.

Although Dove moved to some smaller, independent labels throughout the rest of the 1970s and 1980s, he still continued to record. He opened his own club in Baltimore, and his fans were able to see him perform through the 1980s. He briefly revived the Diamond record label in 1987 to release a couple of singles and an album. These two singles managed to reach the lower rungs of Billboard's country charts.

== Later career and death ==
Dove quit show business in 1989 to care for his ailing mother. She died in 1991, and he resumed performing, mostly on the East Coast and nationwide.

Several compilations have been issued on CD, including The Complete Original Chart Hits: 1964-69, available from Real Gone Music. Dove owned the rights to his music catalog.

In 2018, Dove reissued his 1967 album Cry digitally, sourced from newly available tapes. As of 2021, all his Diamond Records albums (including 1988's From the Heart) have been reissued digitally.

In 2019, Dove's song "Happy Summer Days" was featured in an Amazon commercial.

He retired from performing in 2023, performing his final show on May 14.

Dove died at his home under hospice care on September 15, 2026, at the age of 91.

== Television ==
Dove appeared on The Ed Sullivan Show, American Bandstand, Where the Action Is, The Mike Douglas Show, The Merv Griffin Show, The Lloyd Thaxton Show, The Bob Braun Show, That Nashville Music, Nashville Now, and several other local and national television shows. He appeared on RFD-TV's Shotgun Red Variety Show in 2013.

He also hosted his own television show. The Ronnie Dove Show aired on several stations on the East Coast in 1966. Only two episodes of the show survive (one featuring The Drifters, the other featuring Bobbi Martin).

Dove sold DVDs of the shows on his website as well as at some personal appearances.

== Discography ==
=== Studio albums ===
Title	Album details	Peak chart positions		Certifications (sales thresholds)
Title	Album details	US	US Country	Certifications (sales thresholds)
Right or Wrong	Release date: Dec 1964; Label: Diamond Records	—	—	
One Kiss for Old Times' Sake	Release date: Jun 1965; Label: Diamond Records	119	—	
I'll Make All Your Dreams Come True	Release date: Dec 1965; Label: Diamond Records	—	—	
Ronnie Dove Sings the Hits for You	Release date: Aug 1966; Label: Diamond Records	122	—	
Cry	Release date: Jan 1967; Label: Diamond Records	121	—	
Ronnie Dove	Release date: Mar 1973; Label: MCA Records	—	—	
New Old-Fashioned Love^{A}	Release date: 1977; Label: MC Records	—	—	
Livin' in the Country^{A}	Release date: 1977; Label: MC Records	—	—	
The Bird is Back	Release date: 1985; Label: D.R.D. Records	—	—	
From the Heart	Release date: 1988; Label: Diamond Records	—	—	
Now and Then	Release date: 1998; Label: self-release	—	—	
My Favorite Christmas Songs	Release date: 2004; Label: self-release	—	—	
Red Hat Ladies	Release date: 2012; Label: self-release	—	—	
From the Soul	Release date: Jan 2026; Label: Ronnie Dove Music	—	—	

^{A} These two albums were released as radio station promos only, no stock copies were ever available.

Dove's Diamond Records albums are currently being reissued digitally by Ronnie Dove Music.

=== Compilations ===
- The Swinging Teen Sounds of Ronnie Dove (Design Records, 1965)
- The Best Of Ronnie Dove (Diamond Records No. 5005, 1966) U.S. No. 35
- The Best of Ronnie Dove Volume 2 (Diamond Records No. 5008, 1967)
- Greatest All-Time Hits (Certron Corporation #CS-7011, Stereo, 1970)
- Ronnie Dove Sings His Greatest Hits (Power Pak Records #PO-286, 1975)
- Ronnie Dove (My Dov Records, 1975)
- A Little Bit of Heaven (Jolanina Group, 1981)
- Greatest Hits (Diamond Records, 1988, cassette only)
- The Best of Ronnie Dove (PolyTel Records, 1991)
- His Best (Laurie Records, 1992)
- Golden Greats (Collectables Records, 1994)
- For Collectors Only (Collectables Records, 1995, 3-CD set)
- Faces of Love (Mayberry Records, 1995, cassette only)
- Rarities: 22 Hard to Find Selections (Collectables Records, 1998)
- Greatest Hits (Collectables Records, 2006)
- The Complete Original Chart Hits: 1964-1969 (Real Gone Music, 2014)

=== Singles ===
Year	Titles (A-side, B-side) Both sides from same album except where indicated	Label & number	Chart positions			Album
Year	Titles (A-side, B-side) Both sides from same album except where indicated	Label & number	U.S. Hot 100	U.S. AC	U.S. Country	Album
1959	"Lover Boy" b/w "I'll Be Around"	Dove 1021	-	-	-	Non-album tracks
1961	"Party Doll" b/w "Yes Darling, I'll Be Around"	Decca 31288	-	-	-	Non-album tracks
1962	"Saddest Song (Of the Year)" b/w "No Greater Love"	Jalo 1406	-	-	-	Non-album tracks
1964	"Sweeter Than Sugar" b/w "I Believed in You"	Diamond 163	-	-	-	Right or Wrong
1964	"Say You" b/w "Let Me Stay Today" (Non-album track)	Diamond 167	40	-	-	Right or Wrong
1964	"Right or Wrong"^{A} b/w "Baby, Put Your Arms Around Me"	Diamond 173	14	-	-	Right or Wrong
1965	"Hello Pretty Girl" b/w "Keep It a Secret"	Diamond 176	54	-	-	Right or Wrong
1965	"One Kiss for Old Times' Sake" b/w "No Greater Love" (first pressings) "Bluebird" (later pressings) (Both B-sides from Right Or Wrong)	Diamond 179	14	-	-	One Kiss for Old Times' Sake
1965	"A Little Bit of Heaven" b/w "If I Live to Be a Hundred"	Diamond 184	16	4	-	One Kiss for Old Times' Sake
1965	"I'll Make All Your Dreams Come True" b/w "I Had to Lose You (To Find That I Need You)" (from One Kiss for Old Times' Sake)	Diamond 188	21	2	-	I'll Make All Your Dreams Come True
1965	"Kiss Away" b/w "Where in the World" (from One Kiss for Old Times' Sake)	Diamond 191	25	5	-	I'll Make All Your Dreams Come True
1965	"When Liking Turns to Loving" b/w "I'm Learning How to Smile Again" (from I'll Make All Your Dreams Come True)	Diamond 195	18	6	-	The Best of Ronnie Dove
1966	"Let's Start All Over Again" b/w "That Empty Feeling"	Diamond 198	20	34	-	Ronnie Dove Sings the Hits for You
1966	"Happy Summer Days" b/w "Long After"	Diamond 205	27	7	-	Ronnie Dove Sings the Hits for You
1966	"I Really Don't Want to Know" b/w "Years of Tears" (from Cry)	Diamond 208	22	12	-	Ronnie Dove Sings the Hits for You
1966	"Cry" b/w "Autumn Rhapsody"	Diamond 214	18	16	-	Cry
1967	"One More Mountain to Climb" b/w "All" (from One Kiss for Old Times' Sake)	Diamond 217	45	-	-	Cry
1967	"My Babe" b/w "Put My Mind at Ease" (from I'll Make All Your Dreams Come True)	Diamond 221	50	-	-	The Best of Ronnie Dove, Volume 2
1967	"I Want to Love You for What You Are" b/w "I Thank You for Your Love" (Non-album track)	Diamond 227	54	-	-	The Best of Ronnie Dove, Volume 2
1967	"Dancin' Out of My Heart" b/w "Back from Baltimore" (from The Best of Ronnie Dove, Volume 2)	Diamond 235	87	-	-	Non-album tracks
1968	"In Some Time" b/w "Livin' for Your Lovin'"	Diamond 240	99	37	-	Non-album tracks
1968	"Mountain of Love" b/w "Never Gonna Cry (The Way I'll Cry Tonight)" (Non-album track)	Diamond 244	67	-	-	Ronnie Dove Sings the Hits for You
1968	"Tomboy" b/w "Tell Me Tomorrow"	Diamond 249	96	27	-	Non-album tracks
1969	"What's Wrong with My World" b/w "That Empty Feeling" (from Ronnie Dove Sings the Hits for You)	Diamond 256	131	-	-	Non-album tracks
1969	"I Need You Now" b/w "Bluebird" (from Right or Wrong)	Diamond 260	93	-	-	Non-album tracks
1970	"Chains of Love" b/w "If I Live to Be a Hundred" (from One Kiss for Old Times' Sake)	Diamond 271	118 ^{B}	-	-	Non-album tracks
1971	"Talking to My Children's Mama" b/w "Sunny"	Wrayco 201	-	-	-	Non-album tracks
1971	"If I Cried Every Time You Hurt Me" b/w "Just the Other Side of Nowhere"	Decca 32853	-	-	-	Ronnie Dove
1972	"Kiss the Hurt Away" b/w "He Cries Like a Baby"	Decca 32919	-	-	61	Ronnie Dove
1972	"My World of Memories" b/w "It's No Sin" (Non-album track)	Decca 32997	-	-	-	Ronnie Dove
1972	"Lilacs in Winter" b/w "Is It Wrong (For Loving You)"	Decca 33038	-	-	69	Ronnie Dove
1973	"So Long Dixie" b/w "Take Me Back"	MCA 40106	-	-	-	Non-album tracks
1975	"Please Come to Nashville" b/w "Pictures on Paper"	Melodyland 6004	-	-	75	Non-album tracks
1975	"Things" b/w "Here We Go Again"	Melodyland 6011	-	-	25	Non-album tracks
1975	"Drina (Take Your Love Off for Me)" b/w "Your Sweet Love"	Melodyland 6021	-	-	-	Non-album tracks
1976	"Right or Wrong" b/w "Guns"	Melodyland 6030	-	-	-	Non-album tracks
1976	"Tragedy" b/w "Songs We Sang as Children"	Hitsville 6038	-	-	-	Non-album tracks
1976	"Why Daddy" b/w "The Morning After the Night Before"	Hitsville 6045	-	-	-	Non-album tracks
1978	"The Angel in Your Eyes" b/w "Songs We Sang as Children"	M.C. 5013	-	-	-	New Old-Fashioned Love
1983	"She Feels So Right (I Feel So Wrong)" b/w "Loving on Back Streets"	Moon Shine 3018	-	-	-	The Bird Is Back
1984	"Lucille Stubs" b/w "Loving on Back Streets"	Hobby 1001	-	-	-	The Bird Is Back
1984	"Slowly" b/w "Lucille Stubs"	Hobby 1002	-	-	-	The Bird Is Back
1984	"A Short Walk From Heaven" b/w "Livin' for Your Lovin'"	Hobby 1003	-	-	-	The Bird Is Back
1985	"I Don't Hurt Anymore" b/w "She Feels So Right"	Hobby 1004	-	-	-	The Bird Is Back
1985	"I'll Never Fall in Love Again" b/w "Just Call My Name"	Gallery II 2002	-	-	-	Non-album tracks
1986	"Just Call My Name" b/w "She Feels So Right" (from The Bird Is Back)	NCA 133738	-	-	-	Non-album tracks
1987	"Heart" b/w "Old Time Rock 'n Roll"	Diamond 378	-	-	77	From the Heart
1987	"Rise and Shine" b/w "World of Memories"	Diamond 379	-	-	73	From the Heart

^{A} “Right or Wrong” also peaked at #4 on the Cashbox R&B chart. Billboard was not printing National R&B charts at the time. This was Dove's only record to hit the R&B chart.

^{B} "Chains Of Love" peaked at #118 on the Record World chart.

=== DVDs ===
- Time Capsule (features his American Bandstand and Nashville Now performances, among others)
- The Ronnie Dove Show (features the only two surviving episodes of his television show from 1966)

These two DVDs can be purchased from Dove's website.
