= A Little Bit of Heaven (Ronnie Dove song) =

Single by Ronnie Dove

from the album One Kiss for Old Times' Sake
- B-side: "If I Live to Be a Hundred"
- Released: May 1965
- Recorded: 1965
- Genre: Pop
- Label: Diamond
- Songwriters: Artie Resnick, Kenny Young
- Producers: Phil Kahl, Ray Vernon

Ronnie Dove singles chronology
"One Kiss for Old Times' Sake" (1965)	"A Little Bit of Heaven" (1965)	"I’ll Make All Your Dreams Come True" (1965)

"A Little Bit of Heaven" is a 1965 hit song recorded by Ronnie Dove. It was included in his album One Kiss for Old Times' Sake.

== Background ==
The single was released by Diamond Records. The song peaked at No. 16 on the Hot 100 and No. 4 on the Easy Listening Chart.

== Charts ==
Chart (1965)	Peak position
Canada CHUM Chart	10
U.S. Billboard Hot 100	16
U.S. Billboard Easy Listening	4

== Cover versions ==
Singer Wayne Newton covered the song for his 1965 Summer Wind album.
