= Johnnie Ray =

American singer and pianist (1927–1990)

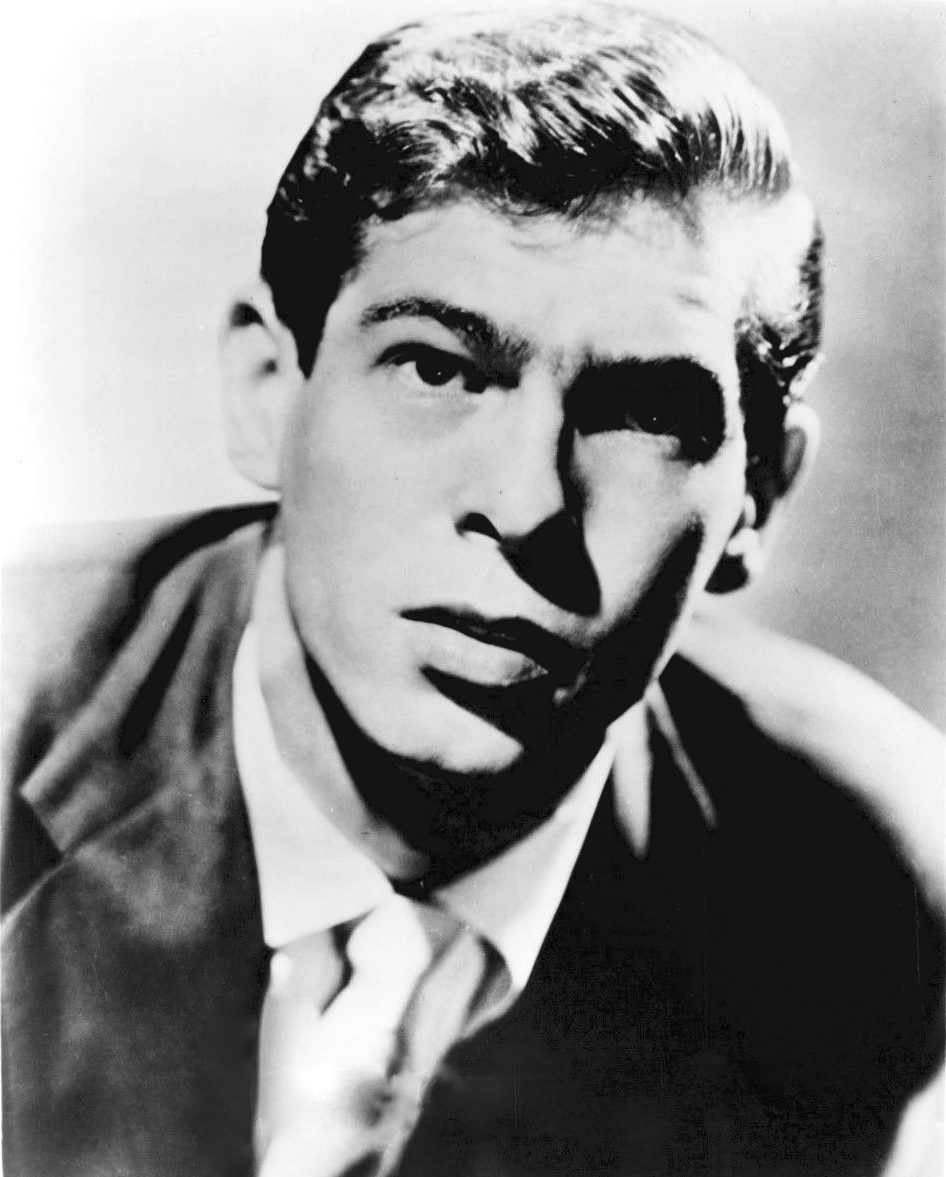
- Ray c. 1952

Background information
- Born: John Alvin Ray; January 10, 1927; Dallas, Oregon, U.S.
- Died: February 24, 1990 (aged 63) Los Angeles, California, U.S.
- Genres: Jazz; blues; rock and roll; traditional pop
- Occupations: Singer; songwriter; pianist
- Instruments: Vocals; piano
- Years active: 1942–1989
- Labels: Okeh; Columbia

John Alvin Ray (January 10, 1927 – February 24, 1990) was an American singer, songwriter, and pianist. Highly popular for most of the 1950s, Ray has been cited by critics as a major precursor to what became rock and roll, for his jazz and blues-influenced music, and his animated stage personality. Tony Bennett called Ray the "father of rock and roll", and historians have noted him as a pioneering figure in the development of the genre.

Born and raised in Dallas, Oregon, Ray, who was partially deaf, began singing professionally at age 15 on Portland radio stations. He gained a local following singing at small, predominantly African-American nightclubs in Detroit, where he was discovered in 1949. In 1951, he signed a contract with Okeh Records, a subsidiary of Columbia Records. On the Billboard charts, he rose quickly from obscurity with the release of his debut album Johnnie Ray (1952), as well as with a 78 rpm single, both of whose sides reached the Billboard magazine's record sales chart, "Cry" and "The Little White Cloud That Cried".

In 1954, Ray made his first film, There's No Business Like Show Business, as part of an ensemble cast that included Ethel Merman and Marilyn Monroe. His career in the music business in his native United States began to decline in 1957, and his American record label dropped him in 1960. He never regained a strong following there and rarely appeared on American television after 1973. Ray's last television appearance in the United States was on a 1977 recorded-for-syndication episode of Sha Na Na. His fanbases in the United Kingdom and Australia remained strong until his final global concert tour in 1989.

British Hit Singles & Albums noted that Ray was "a sensation in the 1950s; the heart-wrenching vocal delivery of 'Cry' ... influenced many acts including Elvis, and was the prime target for teen hysteria in the pre-Presley days." Ray's dramatic stage performances and melancholic songs have been credited by music historians as precursors to the work of later performers ranging from Leonard Cohen to Morrissey.

== Early life ==
John Alvin Ray was born on January 10, 1927, in Dallas, Oregon, to Hazel (née Simkins) and Elmer Ray. Along with older sister Elma, Ray spent part of his childhood on a farm and attended grade school in Dallas. Ray began playing the piano at age three, and beginning at age 12 sang in the local church choir.

At age 13, Ray became deaf in his left ear following a mishap that occurred during a Boy Scout ritual called a "blanket toss". In later years, Ray performed wearing a hearing aid. Surgery performed in 1958 left him almost completely deaf in both ears, although hearing aids helped his condition. Ray credited his deafness as pivotal to his career and performance style, saying, "My need for sincerity traces back to when I was a child and lost my hearing. I became withdrawn. I had an emotional need to develop a relationship to other people."

For a year after Ray's 1940 Boy Scout accident, the Ray family continued to live on their farm near Dallas, Oregon. After the United States entered World War II, the family moved to Portland, Oregon. There Ray's father contributed to the war effort by working as "a welder in the shipyards," according to a Ray biography, and Ray attended Franklin High School. After graduating, Ray worked as a soda jerk, a bus boy, and a mill worker in Salem, the state capital. In the interim, he did jobs playing piano at clubs in Salem and Portland.

== Career ==
=== Early career and success ===
Inspired by rhythm singers like Kay Starr, LaVern Baker, and Ivory Joe Hunter, Ray developed a unique rhythm-based singing style described as alternating between pre-rock rhythm and blues and a more conventional classic pop approach. He began singing professionally on a Portland, Oregon, radio station at age 15, sharing billing with Jane Powell, then a local young singer.

He later performed in comedy shows and theatrical productions in Seattle, Washington before relocating to Detroit, Michigan. In Detroit, Ray regularly performed at the Flame Show Bar Talent Club, an African-American nightclub, where he developed a local following. While performing at the Flame, Ray attracted the attention of song plugger Bernie Lang, who saw him perform with local DJ Robin Seymour of WKMH. Lang went to New York to sell the singer to Danny Kessler of the Okeh Records label. Kessler came over from New York, and he, Lang, and Seymour went to the Flame. According to Seymour, Kessler's reaction was, "Well, I don't know. This kid looks well on the stand, but he will never go on records."

It was Seymour and Lowell Worley of the local office of Columbia Records who persuaded Kessler to have a test record made of Ray. Worley arranged for a record to be cut at United Sound Studios in Detroit. Seymour told reporter Dick Osgood that there was a verbal agreement that he would be cut in on the three-way deal in the management of Ray. However, the deal mysteriously evaporated, and so did Seymour's friendship with Kessler.

Ray's first record for the race label Okeh, the self-penned R&B number "Whiskey and Gin", was a minor hit in 1951. When executives at Okeh's parent Columbia Records realized that the Caucasian Ray had developed a fan base of Caucasian listeners, he was moved over to the Columbia label. In 1952, he dominated the American popular music charts with the double-sided hit single of "Cry" and "The Little White Cloud That Cried". Selling over two million copies of the 78 rpm single, Ray's delivery struck a chord with teenagers and he quickly became a teen idol.

The live television broadcast of Toast of the Town on January 6, 1952, included the first of his several appearances on the widely-seen program, that officially changed its title in 1955 to The Ed Sullivan Show.

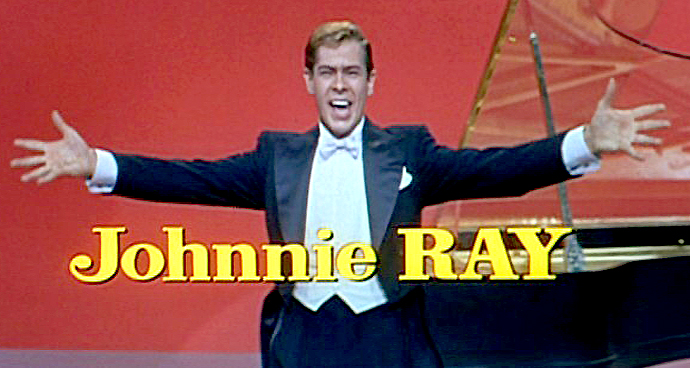
Ray in There's No Business Like Show Business (1954)

Ray's performing style included theatrics later associated with rock and roll, including tearing at his hair, falling to the floor, and crying on stage. Ray quickly earned the nicknames "Mr. Emotion", "The Nabob of Sob", "The Prince of Wails", and several others. One source states that Ray "opened the way for Elvis and the overt sexual energy of rock and roll ... [and] is credited by the Beatles, Bob Dylan, and Elton John as being a formative influence on their artistic styles". As well, Ray's manager said that Elvis Presley often watched Johnnie's concerts.

20th Century Fox executives included him in the ensemble cast of the film There's No Business Like Show Business (1954) alongside Ethel Merman as his mother, Dan Dailey as his father, Donald O'Connor as his brother, Mitzi Gaynor as his sister, and Marilyn Monroe as his sister-in-law. His second and final film role was a cameo as a police officer in Rogue's Gallery, which was intended for release to cinemas in 1968 but was withdrawn. It was not seen publicly until NBC telecast it in 1972, and it never was distributed to theaters. In the 1980s when Ray was asked why he never had made another widely seen film after There's No Business Like Show Business, he replied, "I was never asked."

In the 1950s, after both sides of the single "Cry"/"The Little White Cloud That Cried" ran their course, more hit songs followed. They included "Please, Mr. Sun", "Such a Night", "Walkin' My Baby Back Home", "A Sinner Am I", and "Yes Tonight Josephine". He scored a number-one hit in the United Kingdom with "Just Walkin' in the Rain" (which he initially disliked) during the Christmas season in 1956. He hit again in 1957 with "You Don't Owe Me a Thing", which reached number 10 on the Billboard chart in the United States. Though his American popularity was declining in 1957, he remained popular in the United Kingdom, breaking the attendance record at the London Palladium formerly set by fellow Columbia Records artist Frankie Laine. In later years, he retained a loyal fan base overseas, particularly in Australia.

=== Later career ===
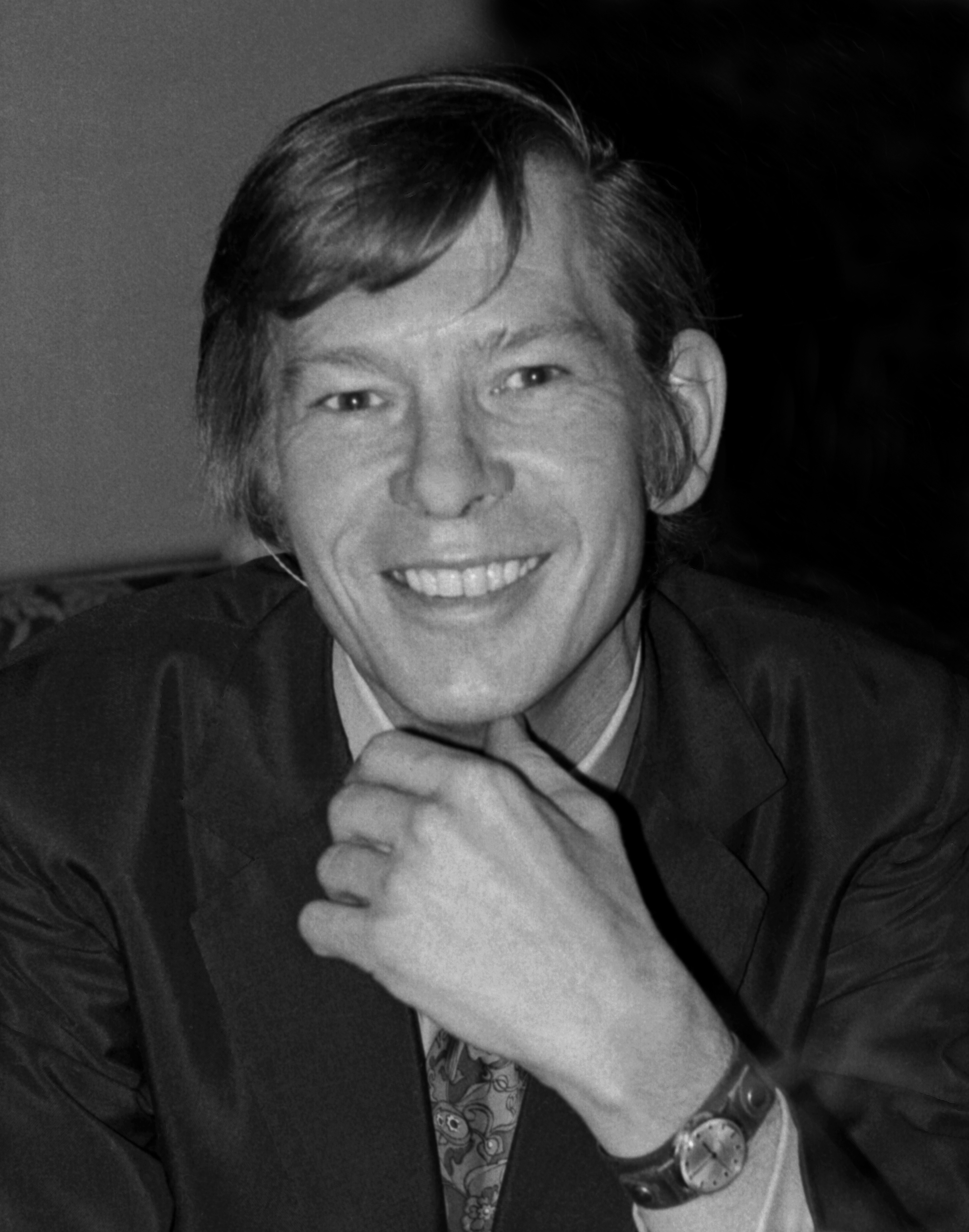
Ray in 1969, as best man at Judy Garland's wedding in London, by Allan Warren

Ray had a close relationship with journalist and television game show panelist Dorothy Kilgallen. They became acquainted soon after his sudden rise to stardom in the United States. They remained close as his American career declined.

Two months before Kilgallen's death in 1965, her newspaper column plugged Ray's engagements at the Latin Quarter in New York and the Tropicana Resort & Casino in Las Vegas, Nevada. He began his gig at the Latin Quarter immediately after an eight-month vacation in Spain, during which he and new manager Bill Franklin had extricated themselves from contracts with Bernie Lang, who had managed Ray from 1951 to 1963. Ray and Franklin believed that a dishonest Lang had been responsible for the end of Ray's stardom in the United States and for large debts that he owed the Internal Revenue Service.

In 1969, Ray headlined a European concert tour with Judy Garland. He served as the best man at her wedding to her last husband, nightclub manager Mickey Deans, in London on March 15, 1969. Denmark and Sweden were among the countries where Ray and Garland performed together; they played in Stockholm on March 19.

In the early 1970s, Ray's American career revived to a limited extent, as he had not released a record album or single in over a decade. He made network television appearances on The Andy Williams Show in 1970, and The Tonight Show Starring Johnny Carson three times during 1972 and 1973. His personal manager, Bill Franklin, resigned in 1976 and cut off contact with the singer a few years later. Ray's last television appearance in the United States was on a 1977 syndicated broadcast of Sha Na Na. His American revival turned out to be short-lived, as his career had already begun to decline as the 1980s approached.

In 1981, Ray hired Alan Eichler as his manager and resumed performing with an instrumental trio rather than with the large orchestras to which he and his audiences had been accustomed for the first 25 years of his career. When Ray and the trio performed at a New York club called Marty's on Third Avenue and East 73rd Street in 1981, The New York Times stated, "The fact that Mr. Ray, in the years since his first blush of success, has been seen and heard so infrequently in the United States is somewhat ironic because it was his rhythm and blues style of singing that help[ed] lay the groundwork for the rock-and-roll that turned Mr. Ray's entertainment world around. Recently, Ringo Starr of the Beatles pointed out that the three singers that the Beatles listened to in their fledgling days were Chuck Berry, Little Richard and Johnnie Ray."

In 1986, Ray appeared as a Los Angeles taxicab driver in Billy Idol's "Don't Need a Gun" video, and is name-checked in the lyrics of the song. During this time period, Ray was generally playing small venues in the United States such as Citrus College in Los Angeles County, California. He performed there in 1987 "with a big-band group," according to a Los Angeles Times profile of him during that year. Other 1980s appearances included the Dunes Hotel in Las Vegas, Resorts International in Atlantic City, and the Vine St. Bar and Grill in Hollywood, where his show was broadcast live by KKJZ ("K-Jazz") radio. In February 1987, a high-school gym in Alexandria, Louisiana was the venue for a Big Band Gala of Stars that included short sets by Ray, Barbara McNair, and other aging singers.

In 1986, Ray and sitcom actress Marla Gibbs were among the notables who helped dedicate Billie Holiday's star on the Hollywood Walk of Fame.

While Ray's popularity continued to wane in the United States throughout the 1980s, Australian, English and Scottish promoters booked him for large venues as late as 1989, his last year of performing.

== Musical influences ==
Ray was significantly influenced by gospel music and numerous African American singers, specifically Billie Holiday, Little Miss Cornshucks and LaVern Baker, as well as Judy Garland and Kay Starr.

== Personal life ==
=== Relationships and sexuality ===
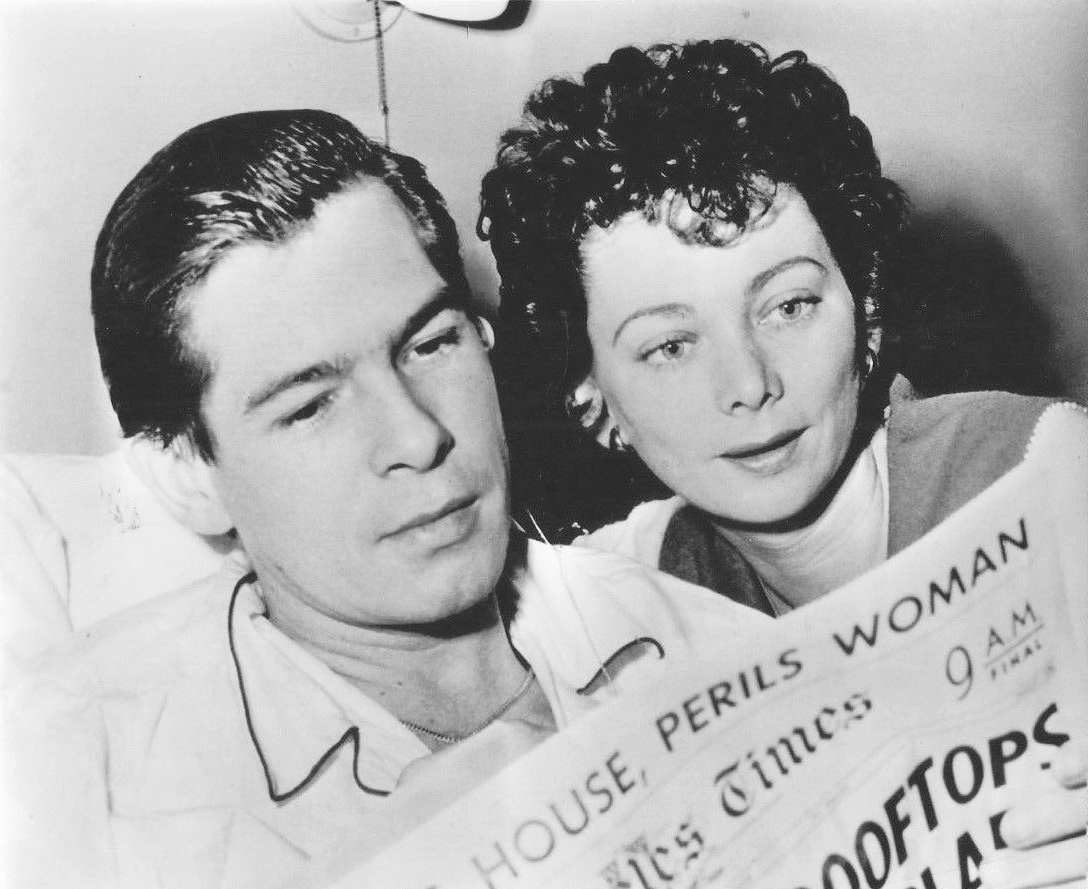
Ray and wife Marilyn Morrison Ray in a photo dated from 1954

In 1951, before Ray became well known, he was arrested in Detroit, Michigan, for soliciting and accosting an undercover male vice-squad police officer for sex in the restroom of the Stone Theatre, a burlesque house. When he appeared in court, he pleaded guilty to the charges, paid a fine, and was released. Detroit newspapers did not report the story because of his obscurity at the time. After his rise to fame the following year, rumors about his sexuality began to spread as a result of the incident.

Despite her knowledge of the solicitation arrest, Marilyn Morrison, daughter of the owner of the Mocambo nightclub, married Ray at the peak of his American fame. The wedding ceremony took place in New York a short time after he gave his first New York concert, which was at the Copacabana. The New York Daily News made the wedding its cover story for May 26, 1952, and it reported that guests included Mayor Vincent R. Impellitteri.

Aware of Ray's unorthodox sexuality, Morrison told a friend she would "straighten it out". The couple separated in 1953 and divorced in 1954. Several writers have noted that the Ray–Morrison marriage occurred under false pretenses, and that Ray had had a long-term relationship with his manager Bill Franklin. However, a biography of Ray points out that Franklin was 13 years younger than Ray, and that both their personal and business relationships began in 1963, many years after the Ray–Morrison divorce. In a 1953 newspaper interview with James Bacon, Ray blamed rumors about his sexuality for the breakup of his marriage to Morrison.

In 1959, Ray was arrested again in Detroit for soliciting an undercover officer at the Brass Rail, a bar that was described many years later by one biographer as a haven for musicians, and by another biographer as a gay bar. Ray went to trial following this second arrest and was found not guilty. Two years after his death, several friends shared with biographer Jonny Whiteside their knowledge that Ray was bisexual. (Note: Ray's bisexuality has been confirmed by biographer Jonny Whiteside, and that has since been reprinted in publications such as The Advocate.)

According to Ray's two biographers, Jonny Whiteside and Tad Mann, he did not have a close relationship with a man or a woman during the 13 years he lived after Bill Franklin stopped interacting with him and phoning him. Ray did maintain a loyal friendship with his road manager Tad Mann, who was married with five children. When Ray gave parties at his Los Angeles home in the late 1970s and throughout the 1980s, frequent guests included Mann (real name Harold Gaze Mann III) and actress Jane Withers.

According to lawyer and researcher Mark Shaw, Ray's relationship with Dorothy Kilgallen produced her youngest child Kerry Kollmar, whom her husband Richard Kollmar disowned after Kilgallen's death in 1965. In two books that Shaw has authored, he claims that Kilgallen remained faithful to her husband for 13 years, ignoring rumors of his extramarital affairs because she did not witness evidence of any of them during that time frame. After years of infidelity, Kollmar became careless, to the extent that in 1953 he brought a male lover into the third-floor master bedroom of his and Dorothy's new home, a five-story townhouse on Manhattan's East 68th Street. After Kilgallen caught the two men in a compromising position, she and Kollmar decided to stay married strictly for business. Their business included a talk radio show they broadcast from home every day that brought them large salaries and that promoted Broadway shows produced by Kollmar. "Dorothy and Dick", as their radio listeners knew them, discussed Ray's singing style on their program, according to a profile of Ray in the Saturday Evening Post edition dated July 26, 1952.

In 1954, Kilgallen gave birth to a baby boy who was photographed for magazines and newspapers with her holding him, never with a father. Decades later, Ray often mentioned Kilgallen to his manager Alan Eichler and remained devastated by her unexpected death in 1965. According to Eichler, Ray never spoke about or acknowledged the rumors that he fathered Kilgallen's third child. Throughout the 1980s when Eichler managed Ray, historians of popular music did not consider Ray important enough to research his private life, so Eichler was not familiar with the eyewitness accounts that Mark Shaw discovered years later, and Eichler did not ask Ray about possible fatherhood.

=== Health problems ===
Ray suffered from alcoholism throughout his life, though during the 1950s at the height of his fame, newspaper and magazine pieces about Ray did not disclose the extent of his drinking problem. On September 2, 1952, Ray was arrested in Boston for public intoxication, but was released four hours later. According to biographer Jonny Whiteside, he drank heavily then. In 1960, he was hospitalized for tuberculosis. Shortly after his recovery, he quit drinking, according to Whiteside. His music was not available for sale, and he did not appear on American television during the first half of the 1960s. Consequently, American newspapers ran display ads for his concerts but reported nothing about his life, such as marital status, offstage behavior, or health issues.

It was not until December 1966 that Ray returned to American television, and even then it was only in a program telecast locally in Chicago, but not elsewhere, titled An Evening with Johnnie Ray. Video footage of this performance was reviewed by Whiteside in the early 1990s, and he wrote in his biography that Ray appeared emaciated and unhealthy.

In 1969, shortly after Ray returned to the United States from a European tour with Judy Garland, an American doctor informed him that he was well enough to drink an occasional glass of wine. He instead resumed drinking heavily, and his health began to decline. Despite this, in the early 1970s he appeared several times on prime-time network television in the United States. After the offers for television stopped, he continued touring, attracting major media attention outside the United States, until he gave his final concert, a benefit for the Grand Theater in Salem, Oregon, on October 6, 1989. Ray performed for many years after the National Enquirer began investigating and reporting celebrity substance abuse, but it made no mention of him during his lifetime.

== Death ==
In early 1990, poor health forced Ray to check into Cedars-Sinai Medical Center near his home in Los Angeles. He was confined there for more than two weeks without the knowledge of journalists or talk radio personalities who had interviewed him in various countries throughout the 1980s.

On February 24, 1990, he died of hepatic encephalopathy resulting from liver failure at Cedars-Sinai. (Note: The obituary for Ray published by the Los Angeles Times notes his death as being caused by liver failure; however, liver failure is not a cause of death in and of itself. The New York Times's obituary notes Ray had been in a coma for several days before his death. Hepatic encephalopathy is the degenerative neurological process that sometimes ends in a coma and/or death, and its cause is failure of the liver; this was the ultimate cause of death in Ray's case.) Kay Starr was among those who spoke at a public memorial service held at Forest Lawn Memorial Park in the Hollywood Hills neighborhood of Los Angeles. He is buried at Hopewell Cemetery near Hopewell, Oregon.

== Legacy ==
For his contribution to the recording industry, Johnnie Ray was honored with a star in 1960 on the Hollywood Walk of Fame at 6201 Hollywood Boulevard.

In 1999, Bear Family Records issued two five-CD sets of his entire body of work, each containing an 84-page book on his career. Companies including Sony Music Entertainment (the parent company of Columbia Records) and Collectables have kept his large catalogue of recordings in continual release worldwide.

Music journalist Robert A. Rodriguez noted Ray's contemporary obscurity in his 2006 book The 1950s' Most Wanted: The Top 10 Book of Rock & Roll Rebels, Cold War Crises, and All American Oddities, writing:

Though barely remembered today, to the fifties record buying public Ray was something of a former-day Leonard Cohen or a Morrissey, creating a body of work that was the very definition of depressionfest. With titles like "What's the Use", "Oh, What a Sad, Sad Day", and "Here I Am Broken Hearted", coupled with a stage show that was as emotionally draining as a revival meeting, Ray dominated the pre-rock & roll charts.

Scholar Cheryl Herr notes the impact of Ray's deafness on his unique performing style and vocals, writing, "[Ray was] a singer whose hearing range appears literally to have defined the contour of his performance, the nature of his short-lived popularity, and his enduring iconic status in pre-rock and proto-rock."

== In popular culture ==
Ray's popularity was spoofed in the play and film As Long As They're Happy, from 1953 and 1955.

The 1959 British film I'm All Right Jack features a young female character with a photograph of Ray on her dressing table, which she kisses.

Archival footage of Ray arriving at London Heathrow Airport in 1954 was featured in the 1982 music video for Dexys Midnight Runners' hit single "Come On Eileen". The lyrics of the song also mention him: "Poor old Johnnie Ray sounded sad upon the radio/Moved a million hearts in mono."

Ray is mentioned in the lyrics of Billy Idol's 1986 hit "Don't Need a Gun", and appears in the video.

Multiple elements of Ray's self-composed hit "I'll Never Fall in Love again" are sampled in Portishead's 1994 song "Biscuit".

He is mentioned in the lyrics of Van Morrison's 1997 song "Sometimes We Cry" from his album The Healing Game, a song that features the backing vocals of Brian Kennedy and Georgie Fame.

Ray is one of the cultural touchstones mentioned in the first verse (concerning events from the late 1940s and early 1950s) of Billy Joel's 1989 hit single "We Didn't Start the Fire", between Red China and South Pacific.

He is mentioned in the lyrics of Jimmy Ray's 1997 song "Are You Jimmy Ray?"

Ray was also referred to in two Eartha Kitt songs: "Monotonous" from New Faces of 1952 ("I even made Johnnie Ray smile for me"), and "I Want to Be Evil" ("I want to sing songs like the guy who cries").

A fictionalized version of him appears in James Ellroy's 2021 novel Widespread Panic.

Bob Dylan has spoken about his very early influences, before he had ever listened to a rock'n'roll record or Hank Williams. Dylan was quoted as saying, "Before that, Johnny [sic] Ray. He was the first singer whose voice and style, I guess, I totally fell in love with. There was just something about the way he sang 'When Your Sweetheart Sends A Letter'...that just knocked me out. I loved his style, wanted to dress like him too."

== Selected discography ==
=== Chart hits ===
Year	Title	Chart positions			
Year	Title	US	CB	US R&B	UK
1951	"Cry" (w/ Four Lads)	1	—	1	—
1951	"The Little White Cloud That Cried" (w/ Four Lads)	2	—	6	—
1952	"Please, Mr. Sun" (w/ Four Lads)	6	—	—	—
1952	"Here Am I-Broken Hearted" (w/ Four Lads)	8	—	—	—
1952	"What's the Use?" (w/ Four Lads)	13	—	—	—
1952	"Walkin' My Baby Back Home"	4	6	—	12
1952	"All of Me"	12	—	—	—
1952	"A Sinner Am I" (w/ Four Lads)	20	—	—	—
1952	"Love Me (Baby Can't You Love Me)"	25	—	—	—
1952	"Faith Can Move Mountains"	—	20	—	7
1952	"Gee, But I'm Lonesome"	—	37	—	—
1952	"A Full-Time Job" (w/ Doris Day)	20	21	—	11
1952	"Ma Says, Pa Says" (w/ Doris Day)	23	28	—	12
1953	"I'm Gonna Walk and Talk With My Lord" (w/ Four Lads)	24	—	—	—
1953	"Somebody Stole My Gal"	8	24	—	6
1953	"Candy Lips" (w/ Doris Day)	17	18	—	—
1953	"Let's Walk That-a-Way" (w/ Doris Day)	—	31	—	4
1953	"With These Hands" (w/ Four Lads)	29	—	—	—
1953	"All I Do Is Dream of You"	27	—	—	—
1953	"Please Don't Talk About Me When I'm Gone"	29	—	—	—
1954	"You'd Be Surprised"	25	—	—	—
1954	"Such a Night"	19	18	—	1
1954	"Hey There"	27	—	—	5
1954	"Hernando's Hideaway"	14	20	—	11
1954	"To Ev'ry Girl-To Ev'ry Boy"	26	40	—	—
1955	"As Time Goes By"	—	35	—	—
1955	"If You Believe"	—	—	—	7
1955	"Paths of Paradise"	—	42	—	20
1955	"Song of the Dreamer"	—	10	—	10
1955	"Johnnie's Comin' Home"	100	—	—	—
1956	"Who's Sorry Now"	—	—	—	17
1956	"Ain't Misbehavin'"	—	—	—	17
1956	"Just Walkin' in the Rain"	2	3	—	1
1957	"You Don't Owe Me a Thing"	10	10	—	12
1957	"Look Homeward, Angel"	36	42	—	7
1957	"Yes Tonight Josephine"	12	24	—	1
1957	"Build Your Love (On a Strong Foundation)"	58	31	—	17
1957	"Up Above My Head" (w/ Frankie Laine)	—	—	—	25
1957	"Good Evening Friends" (w/ Frankie Laine)	—	—	—	flip
1958	"Up Until Now"	81	87	—	—
1959	"I'll Never Fall In Love Again"	75	76	—	26
"—" denotes releases that did not chart or were not released to that territory

=== Studio albums ===
- Johnnie Ray (Columbia, 1952)
- I Cry For You (Columbia, 1955)
- The Big Beat (Columbia, 1957)
- Till Morning (Columbia, 1958)
- On The Trail (Columbia, 1959)
- A Sinner Am I (Philips Records, United Kingdom, 1959)
- Johnnie Ray (aka Till the Clouds Roll By) (Liberty Records, 1962)
- Yesterday, Today and Tomorrow (Celebrity Records, United Kingdom, 1976)
- Remembering (K-Tel Records, stereo re-recordings of his hits)

=== Live albums ===
- Johnnie Ray At The London Palladium (Philips Records, United Kingdom and other overseas territories, 1954)
- Johnnie Ray in Las Vegas (Columbia Records, United States, 1958)

=== Compilations ===
- Johnny Ray's Greatest Hits (Columbia Records CL 1227)
- 20 Golden Greats (Columbia Records & Warwick Records, UK PR 5065 – 1979)
- High Drama: The Real Johnnie Ray (Columbia/Legacy, 1997)
- Cry (Bear Family Records, 1999)
- Yes Tonight, Josephine (Bear Family Records, 1999)

=== Songs ===
1951

- "Cry" (with The Four Lads)
- "(Here Am I) Brokenhearted" (with The Four Lads)
- "The Little White Cloud That Cried" (with The Four Lads)
- "She Didn't Say Nothin' At All"
- "Tell The Lady I Said Goodbye"
- "Whiskey And Gin"

1952

- "All of Me"
- "A Sinner Am I"
- "Candy Lips" (with Doris Day)
- "Coffee and Cigarettes (Think It Over)" (with The Four Lads)
- "Don't Blame Me"
- "Faith Can Move Mountains" (with The Four Lads)
- "Let's Walk That-a-Way" (with Doris Day)
- "Mountains in the Moonlight"
- "Out in the Cold Again" (with The Four Lads)
- "Please, Mr. Sun" (with The Four Lads)
- "The Lady Drinks Champagne"
- "Walkin' My Baby Back Home"
- "Don't Take Your Love From Me"
- "Somebody Stole My Gal"

1953

- "Full Time Job" (with Doris Day)
- "Ma Says, Pa Says" (with Doris Day)

1954

- "Alexander's Ragtime Band"
- "As Time Goes By"
- "Going-Going-Gone"
- "Hernando's Hideaway"
- "Hey There"
- "If You Believe"
- "Johnnie's Comin' Home"
- "Such a Night"

1955

- "Flip, Flop and Fly"
- "I've Got So Many Million Years"
- "Paths of Paradise"
- "Song of the Dreamer"

1956

- "Ain't Misbehavin'"
- "Everyday I Have The Blues"
- "How Long, How Long Blues"
- "I Want to Be Loved (But Only by You)"
- "I'll Never Be Free"
- "I'm Gonna Move to the Outskirts of Town"
- "Just Walkin' in the Rain"
- "Lotus Blossom"
- "Sent For You Yesterday"
- "Shake A Hand"
- "Who's Sorry Now?"

1957

- "Build Your Love (On a Strong Foundation)"
- "Good Evening Friends" (with Frankie Laine)
- "Look Homeward Angel"
- "Should I?"
- "Soliloquy Of a Fool"
- "Street Of Memories"
- "Up Above My Head" (with Frankie Laine)
- "You Don't Owe Me a Thing"
- "Yes Tonight Josephine"

1958

- "I'm Beginning To See the Light"
- "I'm Confessin'"
- "The Lonely Ones"
- "Up Until Now"

1959

- "Cool Water"
- "Empty Saddles"
- "I'll Never Fall in Love Again"
- "It's All in the Game"
- "Red River Valley"
- "Twilight On the Trail"
- "Wagon Wheels"
- "When It's Springtime in the Rockies"

1960

- "I'll Make You Mine"

1961

- "Lookout Chattanooga"
- "Shop Around"

== Filmography ==
Film
Year	Title	Role	Notes
1954	There's No Business Like Show Business	Steve Donahue	first film
1956	Sally	Conrad	first Warner Bros film
1968	Rogue's Gallery	Police officer	

Television
Year	Title	Role	Notes
1953	The Jack Benny Program	Johnnie Ray	Episode: "Johnnie Ray Show"
1953–1959	Toast of the Town	Himself	7 episodes
1954–1955	The Colgate Comedy Hour	Himself – singer	2 episodes
1954–1957	What's My Line?	Himself (Mystery guest)	2 episodes
1955	The Martha Raye Show	Himself	Episode 3.4
1955	General Electric Theater	Johnny Pulaski	Episode: "The Big Shot"
1955	Shower of Stars	Himself	Episode: "That's Life"
1955–1960	Val Parnell's Sunday Night at the London Palladium	Himself	2 episodes
1955–1957	The Jackie Gleason Show	Guest Host	4 episodes
1956	The Jimmy Durante Show	Himself – singer	Episode 2.23; Credited as Johnny Ray
1956	Frankie Laine Time	Himself	Episode 2.5
1957	A Santa for Christmas		Television movie
1957	The Big Record	Himself	Episode 1.11
1957	Spectacular	Himself	3 episodes
1958	The Dick Clark Show	Himself	Episode 1.1
1958	The Garry Moore Show	Himself	Episode 1.8
1959	The Patti Page Oldsmobile Show	Himself	Episode 1.16
1959	Johnnie Ray Sings	Himself – Singer/Host	Television special
1962	The Jack Paar Tonight Show	Himself	Episode 5.194
1963	American Bandstand	Himself	Episode 6.121
1967	The Woody Woodbury Show	Himself	Episode 1.16
1968	The Hollywood Palace	Himself	Episode 5.16
1968	Frost on Sunday	Himself	Episode 1.19
1968–1969	The Joey Bishop Show	Himself	3 episodes
1970	The David Frost Show	Himself	Episode 2.129
1970	Della	Himself	Episode 1.192
1970	The Andy Williams Show	Himself	October 10, 1970, episode
1970–1973	The Tonight Show Starring Johnny Carson	Himself	3 episodes
1972	The ABC Comedy Hour	Himself	Episode: "The Twentieth Century Follies"
1974	The Wheeltappers and Shunters Social Club	Himself	Episode 1.11
1975	Dinah!	Himself	Episode 1.61
1977	Sha Na Na	Himself	Episode 1.17
1977	American Bandstand's 25th Anniversary	Himself	Television special
1977	All You Need Is Love	Himself	Episode: "Good Times: Rhythm and Blues"
1977	Fall In, the Stars	Himself	Television special
1977	The Merv Griffin Show	Himself	September 21, 1977, episode
1979	Juke Box Saturday Night	Himself	Television special
1979–1980	CHiPs	Himself	2 episodes Uncredited
1987	Royal Variety Performance 1987	Himself	Television special

== See also ==
- List of LGBTQ people from Portland, Oregon

== Works cited ==
- DeMain, Bill (2004). In Their Own Words: Songwriters Talk about the Creative Process. Greenwood Publishing Group. ISBN 0-275-98402-8.
- Hage, Erik (2009). The Words and Music of Van Morrison. ABC-CLIO. ISBN 978-0-313-35862-3.
- Herr, Cheryl (2009). "Roll-over-Beethoven: Johnnie Ray in context". Popular Music. 28 (3): 323–340. doi:10.1017/S0261143009990092. S2CID 191527227.
- Israel, Lee (1979). Kilgallen. New York: Delacorte Press. ISBN 0-440-04522-3.
- Mann, Brent (2003). 99 Red Balloons: And 100 Other All Time Great One-Hit Wonders. Kensington Publishing Corporation. ISBN 0-806-52516-9.
- Roberts, David (2006). British Hit Singles & Albums. Guinness World Records Limited. ISBN 1-904994-10-5.
- Rodriguez, Robert (2006). The 1950s' Most Wanted: The Top 10 Book of Rock & Roll Rebels, Cold War Crises, and All American Oddities. Washington, D.C.: Potomac Books. ISBN 978-1-574-88715-0.
- Schechter, Scott (2002). Judy Garland: The Day-by-Day Chronicle of a Legend. Lanham, Maryland: Cooper Square Press. ISBN 0-8154-12053.
- Stanton, Scott (2003). The Tombstone Tourist: Musicians. Simon and Schuster. ISBN 0-743-46330-7.
- Wald, Elijah (2011). How the Beatles Destroyed Rock 'n' Roll: An Alternative History of American Popular Music. Oxford University Press. ISBN 978-0-199-75697-1.
- Wood, Carlyle (1956). TV Personalities: Biographical Sketch Book. Vol. 2. TV Personalities.
