= One Kiss for Old Times' Sake =

One Kiss For Old Times’ Sake

Studio album by Ronnie Dove
- Released: 1965
- Genre: Pop
- Label: Diamond
- Producers: Phil Kahl, Ray Vernon

Ronnie Dove chronology
Right or Wrong (1964)	One Kiss For Old Times’ Sake (1965)	I'll Make All Your Dreams Come True (1965)

One Kiss for Old Times' Sake is Ronnie Dove's second album for Diamond Records.

== History ==
The album was recorded in Nashville, Tennessee and released on the strength of two hit singles, "A Little Bit of Heaven" and "One Kiss for Old Times’ Sake", both of which were Top 20 pop hits. In Canada, ""One Kiss for Old Times' Sake"" reached #3 on the CHUM Charts.

The initial Billboard magazine reviews stated that "The warm and sensitive vocal stylist offers an album of tender love ballads including his current hit single "A Little Bit of Heaven" and the recent "One Kiss for Old Times' Sake." His feel for country flavor is a remarkable one for the Baltimore-born balladeer." Adding that "...the arrangements of Bill Justis and Ray Stevens enhance the fresh vocal readings."

The album was reissued on CD in the mid 1990s, being paired with Dove’s I'll Make All Your Dreams Come True album. More recently, the album was reissued digitally by Ronnie Dove Music, with a few songs sourced from newly available tapes that were previously unavailable.

== Chart performance ==
The album debuted on Billboard magazine's Top LP's chart in the issue dated July 24, 1965, peaking at No. 119 during a long forty-one-week run on the chart. The album debuted on Cashbox magazine's Top 100 Albums chart in the issue dated July 31, 1965, peaking at No. 43 during a fifteen-week run on the chart.

== Track listing ==
No.	Title	Writer(s)	Length
1.	"She Only Makes Me Love You More"	Vinnie Monte, Frank Catana	2:42
2.	"All of Me"	Seymour Simons, Gerald Marks	3:10
3.	"I Had to Lose You (To Find That I Need You)"	Roy Alfred, Wes Farrell	2:20
4.	"If I Live to Be a Hundred"	Ben Raleigh, Mark Barkan	2:35
5.	"If I Cried Every Time You Hurt Me"	Harlan Howard	2:23
6.	"A Little Bit of Heaven"	Artie Resnick, Kenny Young	2:33
7.	"All"	Johnny Lehmann, Herb Miller	2:36
8.	"Nevertheless (I'm in Love with You)"	Bert Kalmar, Harry Ruby	2:35
9.	"Where in the World"	Roy Alfred, Doug Barnd, Wes Farrell	2:06
10.	"It's Almost Tomorrow"	Gene Adkinson	3:16
11.	"One Kiss for Old Times' Sake"	Artie Resnick, Kenny Young	2:35

== Charts ==
Chart (1965)	Peak position
US Billboard Top LPs	119
US Cashbox Top 100 Albums	43
