= Diamond Records =

American record label

Diamond Records was a record label, based in New York City, which was founded in 1961 by former Roulette Records executive Joe Kolsky. Another Roulette exec, Kolsky's brother Phil Kahl, joined Kolsky in the venture the following year.

== History ==
Success for the label was slow but they got their first big hit in 1962 with "Loop de Loop" by Johnny Thunder. That record led to a distribution deal with EMI to distribute Diamond recordings on Stateside Records in the UK. Diamond recordings were issued in Canada by Apex Records until roughly 1967, when a Canadian version of Diamond was set up. All releases after that had the same logo design as the U.S. releases.

In September 1962, Phil Kahl purchased 36 master recordings of Dave "Baby" Cortez from his former label, Clock Records. Kahl then set up the Emit label to release these recordings, with Diamond distributing the records. However, the label folded after only four single releases.

In August 1963, Del Shannon's relationship with his managers and Bigtop Records had soured, so he formed his own label, Berlee Records, named after his parents, distributed by Diamond Records. Two singles were issued: the apparently Four Seasons–inspired "Sue's Gotta Be Mine" was a moderate hit, reaching number 71 in the U.S. and number 21 in the UK (where Shannon's records continued on the London Records label). The second single, "That's the Way Love Is", did not chart, and Shannon patched things up with his managers soon after. In early 1964, he was placed on Amy Records' (Stateside label in the UK), and the Berlee label disappeared.

In addition to this label, Diamond also distributed the short-lived Inette label, scoring a minor hit with Kirby St. Romain's 1963 single "Summer's Comin,'" which reached number 49.

The only consistent hit maker for the label was Ronnie Dove who had a string of pop and easy listening hits for Diamond from 1964 to 1969, mostly produced by Kahl.

Kolsky and Kahl sold their interest in Diamond Records in 1968 to the Edwin H. Morris Corporation which sold it in 1970 to Certron Corporation. The Certron label folded by 1972. The fate of the Diamond catalog is unknown, but Ronnie Dove's recordings are widely available on CD.

In 1987 Dove revived the label to release a couple of singles and another album. He owns all of his recordings made for the label, and has reissued them through Ronnie Dove Music and Real Gone Music.

== Partial artist roster ==
- Ronnie Dove
- Johnny Thunder
- Bobby Vinton
- Gary Criss
- Dickie Goodman
- Mitch Miller
- Dickey Lee
- Russell Morris
- The Bobbettes
- The Bleus
- Ruby Winters
- Don Varner
- Kevin McQuinn (Eddie Quinn of The Mello-Kings)
- Kirby St. Romain

== Album discography ==
The label released a total of eight albums in its entire history. The first album was by Johnny Thunder and the remaining albums were all by Ronnie Dove.

- “Loop De Loop” (S)D-5001 – Johnny Thunder (1963)
- “Right or Wrong” (S)D-5002 – Ronnie Dove (1964)
- ”One Kiss for Old Times' Sake” (S)D-5003 – Ronnie Dove (1965)
- ”I'll Make All Your Dreams Come True” (S)D-5004 – Ronnie Dove (1965)
- ”The Best of Ronnie Dove” (S)D-5005 – Ronnie Dove (1966)
- ”Ronnie Dove Sings the Hits for You” (S)D-5006 – Ronnie Dove (1966)
- ”Cry” (S)D-5007 – Ronnie Dove (1967)
- ”The Best of Ronnie Dove Volume 2” (S)D-5008) – Ronnie Dove (1967)

Related Release:

- ”From the Heart” D-380 – Ronnie Dove (1988)
