= Cry (disambiguation) =

To cry is to shed tears.

Cry, The Cry or Cries may also refer to:

== Arts, entertainment, and media ==
=== Films ===
- The Cry (1957 film), a 1957 Italian black-and-white film
- The Cry (1964 film), a 1964 Czech film
- The Cry (2007 film), a 2007 horror film

=== Television ===
- The Cry (2002 TV series), a 2002 British TV series
- The Cry (2018 TV series), a 2018 Australian-British TV series

=== Music ===
==== Albums ====
- Cry (Alastair Galbraith album), 2000
- Cry (Cigarettes After Sex album), 2019
- Cry (Faith Hill album), 2002
- Cry (Lynn Anderson album), 1972
- Cry (Ronnie Dove album), 1967
- Cry (Simple Minds album), 2002
- The Cry (Steve Lacy album), recorded in 1988 and released in 1999
- The Cry!, a 1963 jazz album by Prince Lasha Quintet featuring Sonny Simmons

==== Songs ====
- "Cry" (Alex Parks song), 2004
- "Cry" (Ashnikko song), 2020
- "Cry" (Benson Boone song), 2024
- "Cry" (Churchill Kohlman song), 1951, covered by Johnnie Ray and The Four Lads, Ronnie Dove, and others
- "Cry" (Dotter song), 2017 song by Swedish singer Dotter
- "Cry" (Dragon song), 1984 song by New Zealand-Australian rock band Dragon
- "Cry" (Faith Hill song), by Angie Aparo, 1999
- "Cry" (Godley & Creme song), 1985
- "Cry" (Just a Little), 2011 song by Dutch dance duo Bingo Players
- "Cry" (Kelly Clarkson song), 2010
- "Cry" (Kym Marsh song), 2003
- "Cry" (LL Cool J song), 2008
- "Cry" (Mandy Moore song), 2002
- "Cry" (The Mavis's song), 1998
- "Cry" (Michael Jackson song), 2001
- "Cry" (Sigma song), 2016
- "Cry" (The Sundays song), 1997
- "Cry" (Stellar single), 2016
- "Cry" (The Used song), 2014 song by American rock band The Used
- "Cry" (Waterfront song), 1988
- "Cry", a song by Anne-Marie from Speak Your Mind (2018)
- "Cry", a song by Benedictum, from the album Obey (2013)
- "Cry", a song by Carly Rae Jepsen from the EP Emotion: Side B (2016)
- "Cry", a song by Charlie Puth, from his album Whatever's Clever! (2026)
- "Cry", a song by Conception, from the album Flow (1997)
- "Cry", a song by Hilary Duff from her self-titled album (2004)
- "Cry", a song by James Blunt from Back to Bedlam (2004)
- "Cry", a song by Jay Sean from My Own Way (2008)
- "Cry", a song by Mariah Carey from Me. I Am Mariah... The Elusive Chanteuse (2014)
- "Cry", a song by Mika from My Name Is Michael Holbrook (2019)
- "Cry", a song by Nemesea, from the album Mana (2004)
- "Cry", a song by Norther, from the album Mirror of Madness (2003)
- "Cry", a song by Pharaoh from the album Bury the Light (2012)
- "Cry", a song by Reba McEntire from All the Women I Am (2010)
- "Cry", a song by Rihanna from the UK version of the album Good Girl Gone Bad (2007)
- "Cry", a song by Roxette from the album Look Sharp! (1988)
- "Cry", a song by Simple Minds from the album Cry (2002)
- "Cry", a song by System F from the album Out of the Blue (2001)
- "Cry", a song by That Handsome Devil from A City Dressed in Dynamite (2008)

=== Other uses in arts, entertainment, and media ===
- The Cry (book), a 1754 satirical novel
- The Cry or The Scream, an 1893 painting by Edvard Munch

== Organizations ==
- Cardiac Risk in the Young, a charitable organization, based in the UK
- Child Rights and You, a worldwide non-profit organization
- CRY America, a non-profit organization in the United States

== Science ==
- Cry protein, a delta-endotoxin produced by the bacterium Bacillus thuringiensis
- CRY1 and CRY2, Cryptochrome proteins in plants and animals

== Other uses ==
- Cry, Yonne, a commune in France
- Crayford railway station, London, England (National Rail station code)

== See also ==
- Cry, the Beloved Country (disambiguation)
- Cry Cry Cry (disambiguation)
- "cryo-", meaning "cold" or "freeze": see
- I Cry (disambiguation)
- I Cried (disambiguation)
- Crying (disambiguation)
- Cray, an American supercomputer manufacturer
- Krai, a Russian administrative district
- Kray (disambiguation)
