= Philip Sidney (disambiguation) =

Philip Sidney (1554–1586) was an English poet, courtier and soldier.

Philip Sidney may also refer to:

- Philip Sidney, 3rd Earl of Leicester (1619–1698), son of Robert Sidney, 2nd Earl of Leicester
- Philip Sidney, 5th Earl of Leicester (1676–1705), British peer and Member of Parliament for Kent
- Philip Sidney, 1st Baron De L'Isle and Dudley (1800–1851), British Tory politician
- Philip Sidney, 2nd Baron De L'Isle and Dudley (1828–1898)
- Philip Sidney, 2nd Viscount De L'Isle (born 1945), British peer and former soldier

== See also ==
- Sir Philip Sidney game
- Sir Philip Sydney Jones (1836–1918), Australian medical practitioner
