= Vocal communication =

Vocal communication may refer to:

- Speech, a form of human communication
- Animal communication using vocalizations
