= Crying (disambiguation) =

Crying is the human production of tears in response to an emotional state.

Crying may also refer to:

== Music ==
- Crying (band), an American rock band from Purchase, New York
- Crying (album), a 1962 album by Roy Orbison

=== Songs ===
- "Cryin'", a 1993 song by Aerosmith
- "Cryin'" (Joe Satriani song), 1992
- "Crying" (Roy Orbison song), 1961
- "Cryin'" (Vixen song), 1988
- "Crying", by Björk from Debut
- "Crying", by Bobby Vinton from Roses Are Red
- "Cryin'", by Boston from Corporate America
- "Crying", by BoyNextDoor from Why..
- "Cryin'", by Chris Isaak from Chris Isaak
- "Cryin'", by Doro from Angels Never Die
- "Cryin'", by Eric Clapton from Crossroads 2: Live in the Seventies
- "Crying", by George Harrison from Wonderwall Music
- "Crying", by King Gizzard & the Lizard Wizard from Oddments
- "Crying", by J. J. Cale from Okie
- "Cryin'", by Ringo Starr from Ringo's Rotogravure
- "Crying", by Sistar from Give It To Me
- "Crying", by TV on the Radio from Dear Science
- "Crying", by Yngwie Malmsteen from Trilogy

== Other uses ==
- "Crying" (Beavis and Butt-Head), an episode of Beavis and Butt-Head

== See also ==
- Cry (disambiguation)
- Animal communication
- Town crier
