= Eye contact =

Form of nonverbal communication

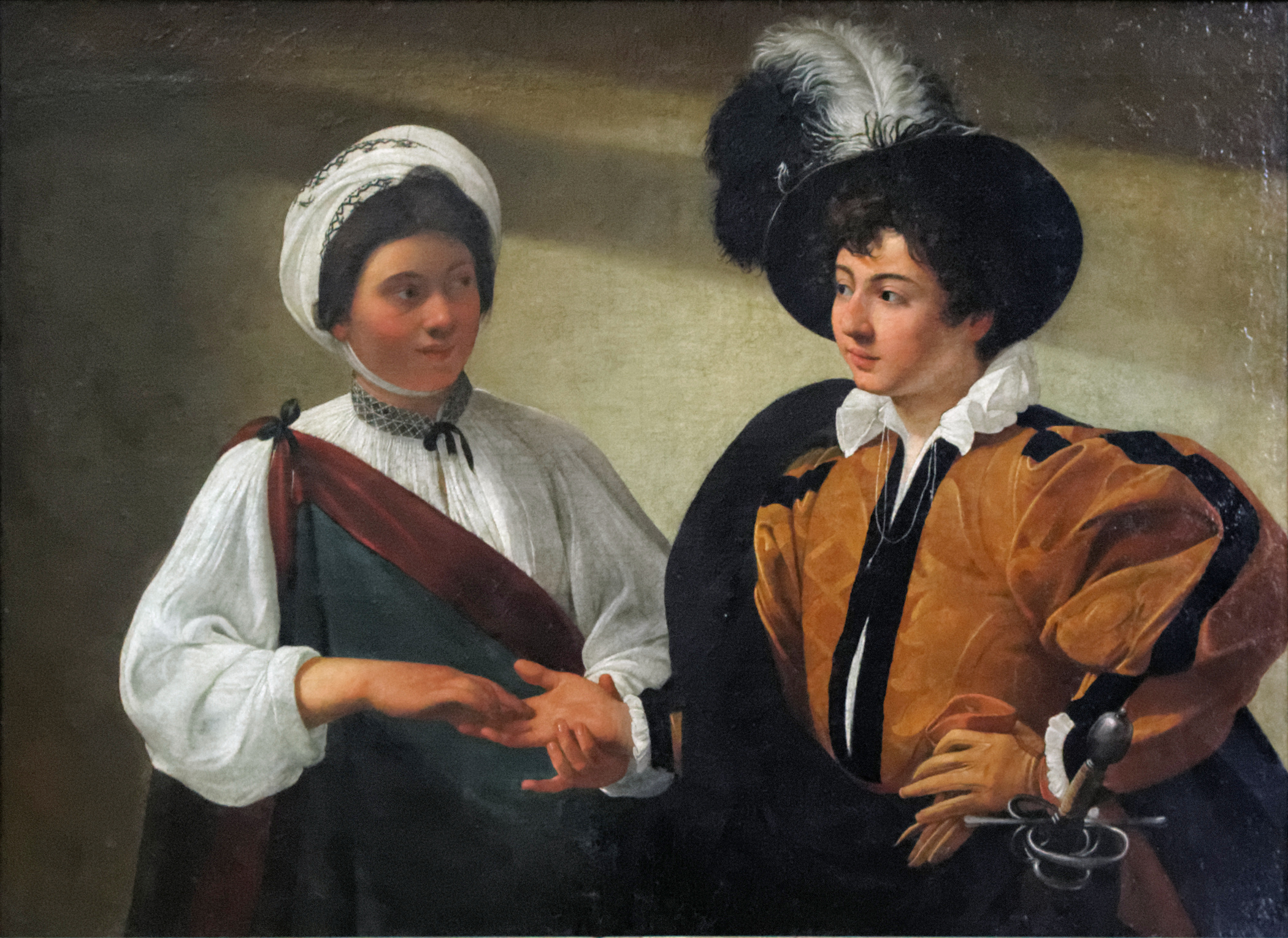
Two figures making eye contact in Caravaggio's The Fortune Teller c. 1595

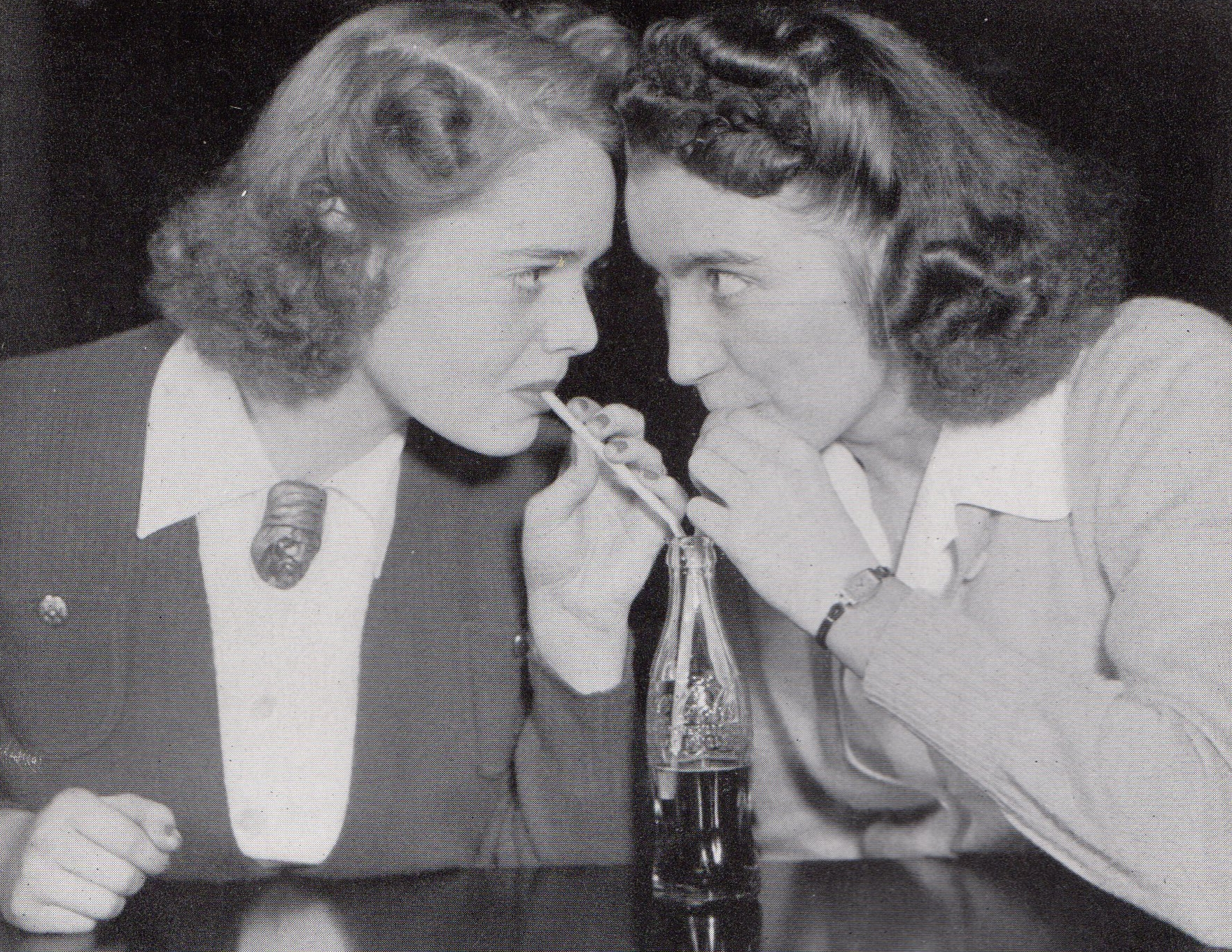
Two students locking eyes

Eye contact occurs when two people or non-human animals look at each other's eyes at the same time. In people, eye contact is a form of nonverbal communication and can have a large influence on social behavior. Coined in the early to mid-1960s, the term came from the West to often define the act as a meaningful and important sign of confidence and respect. The customs, meaning, and significance of eye contact can vary greatly between societies, neurotypes, and religions.

The study of eye contact is sometimes known as oculesics.

== Social meanings ==
Eye contact and facial expressions provide important social and emotional information. People, perhaps without consciously doing so, search other's eyes and faces for positive or negative mood signs. In some contexts, the meeting of eyes arouses strong emotions. Eye contact provides some of the strongest emotions during a social conversation. This primarily is because it provides details on emotions and intentions. In a group, if eye contact is not inclusive of a certain individual, it can make that individual feel left out of the group; while on the other hand, prolonged eye contact can tell someone you are interested in what they have to say.

Establishing eye contact and eyebrow rise are also forms of ostensive behavior, i.e., these may convey an intention to communicate.

Eye contact is also an important element in flirting, where it may serve to establish and gauge the other's interest in some situations. Mutual eye contact that signals attraction initially begins as a brief glance and progresses into a repeated volleying of eye contact.

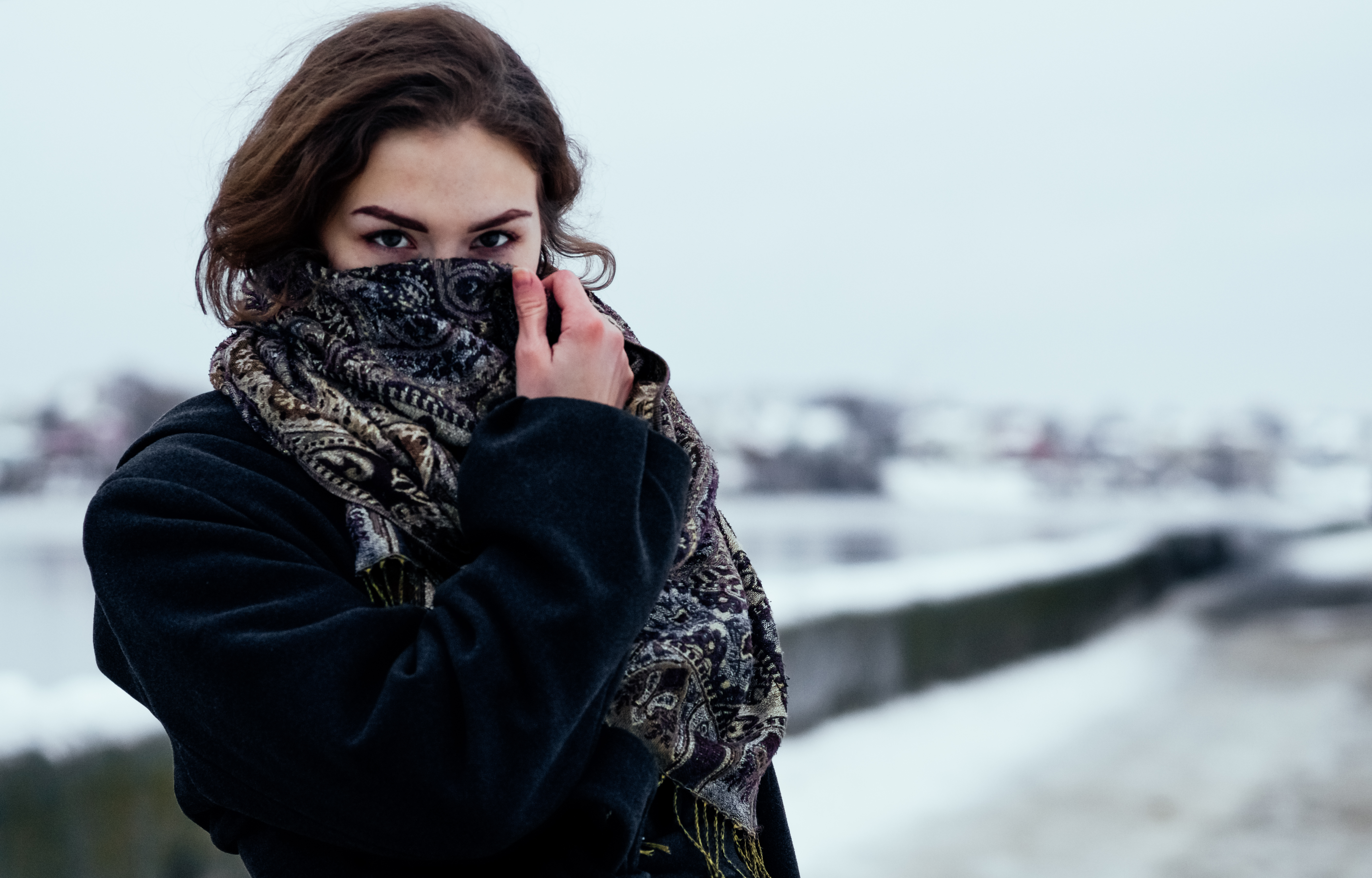
Encouraged eye contact by narrowing the visible face down to the eyes.

In the process of civil inattention, strangers in close proximity, such as a crowd, avoid eye contact in order to help maintain their privacy.

== Effects ==
=== Parent–child ===
A 1985 study suggested that "3-month-old infants are comparatively insensitive to being the object of another's visual regard". A 1996 Canadian study with 3- to 6-month-old infants found that smiling in infants decreased when adult eye contact was removed. A recent British study in the Journal of Cognitive Neuroscience found that face recognition by infants was facilitated by direct gaze. Other recent research has confirmed that the direct gaze of adults influences the direct gaze of infants. Within their first year, infants learn rapidly that the looking behaviors of others conveys significant information. Infants prefer to look at faces that engage them in mutual gaze; from an early age, healthy babies show enhanced neural processing of direct gaze.

=== Facilitating learning ===
In the 2000s, studies suggest that eye contact has a positive impact on the retention and recall of information and may promote more efficient learning.

=== Maternal sensitivity ===
In a 2001 study conducted in Germany examining German infants during their first 12 weeks of life, researchers studied the relationship between eye contact, maternal sensitivity, and infant crying to attempt to determine if eye contact and maternal sensitivity were stable over time. In this correlational study, they began by categorizing the mother's sensitivity placing them into one of four behavioral categories: inhibited/intense behavior, distortion of infant signals, over and understimulational, and aggressive behavioral. Next, the observer video-taped the mother and infant's free play interactions on a weekly basis for 12 weeks. When watching the videos, they measured the mutual eye contact between the mother and the infant by looking at the overlap in time when the mothers looked at their infant's face and when the infants looked at their mother's face. The mothers were also asked to record their infant's crying in a diary.

The study found that the amount of eye contact between the study's German mothers and infants increased continuously over the first 12 weeks. The mother who held eye contact with her child early on (week 1–4) was described as sensitive to her infant whereas if she did not hold eye contact, her behavior was described as insensitive. They also found a negative relationship between eye contact and the duration of crying of the infants; as eye contact increases, crying decreases. Maternal sensitivity was also shown to be stable over time. According to the study, these findings may potentially be based on the assumption that sensitive mothers are more likely to notice their child's behavioral problems than non-sensitive mothers.

== Difficulty ==
Some people find eye contact difficult. For example, those with autism spectrum disorders or social anxiety disorders may find eye contact to be particularly unsettling.

Strabismus, especially esophoria or exophoria, interferes with normal eye contact: a person whose eyes are not aligned usually makes full eye contact with one eye only, while the orientation of the other eye deviates slightly or more.

=== Eye aversion and mental processing ===
In one study conducted by British psychologists from the University of Stirling, among 20 British children at the age of five, researchers concluded that among the children in the study, the children who avoid eye contact while considering their responses to questions are more likely to answer correctly than children who maintain eye contact. While humans obtain useful information from looking at the face when listening to someone, the process of looking at faces is mentally demanding. Therefore, it may be unhelpful to look at faces when trying to concentrate and process something else that is mentally demanding. According to Doherty-Sneddon, a blank stare likely indicates a lack of understanding.

== Cultural differences ==
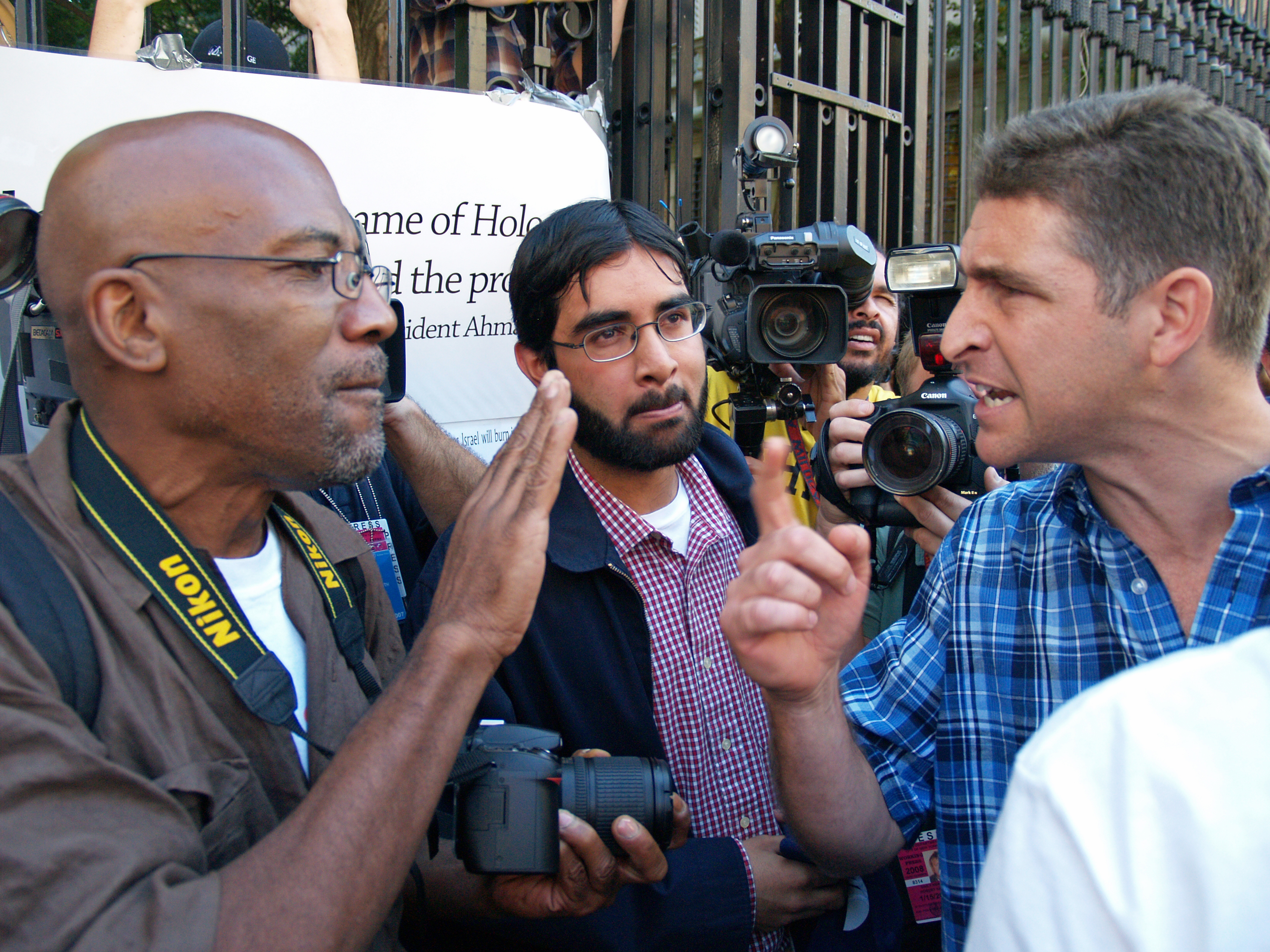
Two men staring each other in the eye during a political debate

In many cultures, such as in East Asia and Nigeria, it is respectful not to look the dominant person in the eye, but in Western culture this can be interpreted as being "shifty-eyed", and the person averting eye contact can be judged as bad because "they wouldn't look me in the eye"; references such as "shifty-eyed" can refer to suspicions regarding an individual's unrevealed intentions or thoughts. Nevertheless, the seeking of constant unbroken eye contact by the other participant in a conversation can be considered overbearing or distracting by many even in Western cultures, possibly on an instinctive or subconscious level.

In traditional Islamic theology, it is often advised to lower one's gaze when looking at other people in order to avoid sinful sensuous appetites and desires. Excessive eye contact or "staring" is also sometimes described as impolite, inappropriate, or even disrespectful, especially between youths and elders or children and their parents, and so lowering one's gaze when talking with older people is seen as a sign of respect and reverence. Nonetheless, actual cultural and societal practices in this regard vary greatly.

Japanese children are taught in school to direct their gaze at the region of their teacher's Adam's apple or tie knot. As adults, Japanese lower their eyes when speaking to a superior as a gesture of respect.

Some bodies of parliamentary procedure, such as the Minnesota Senate, ban eye contact between members when speaking.

== Clinical description ==
For clinical evaluation purposes in the practice of psychiatry and clinical psychology, as part of a mental status exam, the clinician may describe the initiation, frequency, and quality of eye contact. For example, the doctor may note whether the patient initiates, responds to, sustains, or evades eye contact. The clinician may also note whether eye contact is unusually intense or blank, or whether the patient glares, looks down, or looks aside frequently.

== Between species ==
Eye contact can also be a significant factor in interactions between non-human animals, and between humans and non-human animals.

Animals of many species, including dogs, often perceive eye contact as a threat. Many programs to prevent dog bites recommend avoiding direct eye contact with an unknown dog. According to a report in The New Zealand Medical Journal, maintaining eye contact is one reason young children may be more likely to fall victim to dog attacks.

On the other hand, extended eye contact between a dog and its owner modulates the secretion of oxytocin, a neuromodulator that is known for its role in maternal-infant bonding.

Hikers are commonly advised to avoid direct eye contact if they have surprised a bear, since the bear may interpret the eye contact as a threat, although some sources suggest maintaining eye contact.

Among primates, eye contact is seen as especially aggressive, and staring at them in a zoo can induce agitated behavior. Chimpanzees use eye contact to signal aggression in hostile encounters. Eye tracking research shows that chimps are more likely to look at the mouth, while bonobos are more likely to look at the eyes; eye contact is lower among socially deprived primates. A 2007 incident at Rotterdam Zoo is believed to be connected to eye contact: Bokito the gorilla escaped from his exhibit and injured a woman who had visited him several times and apparently often held prolonged eye contact. Visitors were later given special glasses that averted their apparent gaze when looking at Bokito.

== See also ==
- Australian Aboriginal avoidance practices
- Evil eye
- Eyebrow flash
- Face-to-face
- Interpersonal communication
- Joint attention
- Scopophobia
- The look – description of interpersonal discomfort by Jean-Paul Sartre
- Staring contest
- Look Me in the Eye
- When I Look in Your Eyes
- When I Look Into Your Eyes
- When You Look Me in the Eyes

== Works cited ==
- Krueger, Juliane (2008). Nonverbal Communication. GRIN Verlag. ISBN 978-3-638-93015-4.
