= I Cry =

I Cry may refer to

== Music ==
- I Cry (album), 2008 EP by Rotersand
- "I Cry" (Flo Rida song), 2012
- "I Cry" (Ja Rule song), 2001 Ja Rule song featuring Lil' Mo
- "I Cry" (Tammy Cochran song), 2001
- "I Cry" (Usher song), 2020
- "I Cry", a 1965 song by Tages
- "I Cry", a song by Westlife from their 2001 album World of Our Own
- "I Cry", a song by Shayne Ward from his 2006 album Shayne Ward
- "I Cry", a song by Julian Perretta from his 2016 album Karma
- "I Cry (Night After Night)", a song by Egyptian Lover from his 1984 album On the Nile

== See also ==
- Cry (disambiguation)
- I Cried (disambiguation)
- I Cry for You, a 1955 studio album by Johnnie Ray
