= Signature whistle =

Distinctive whistle of the bottlenose dolphin

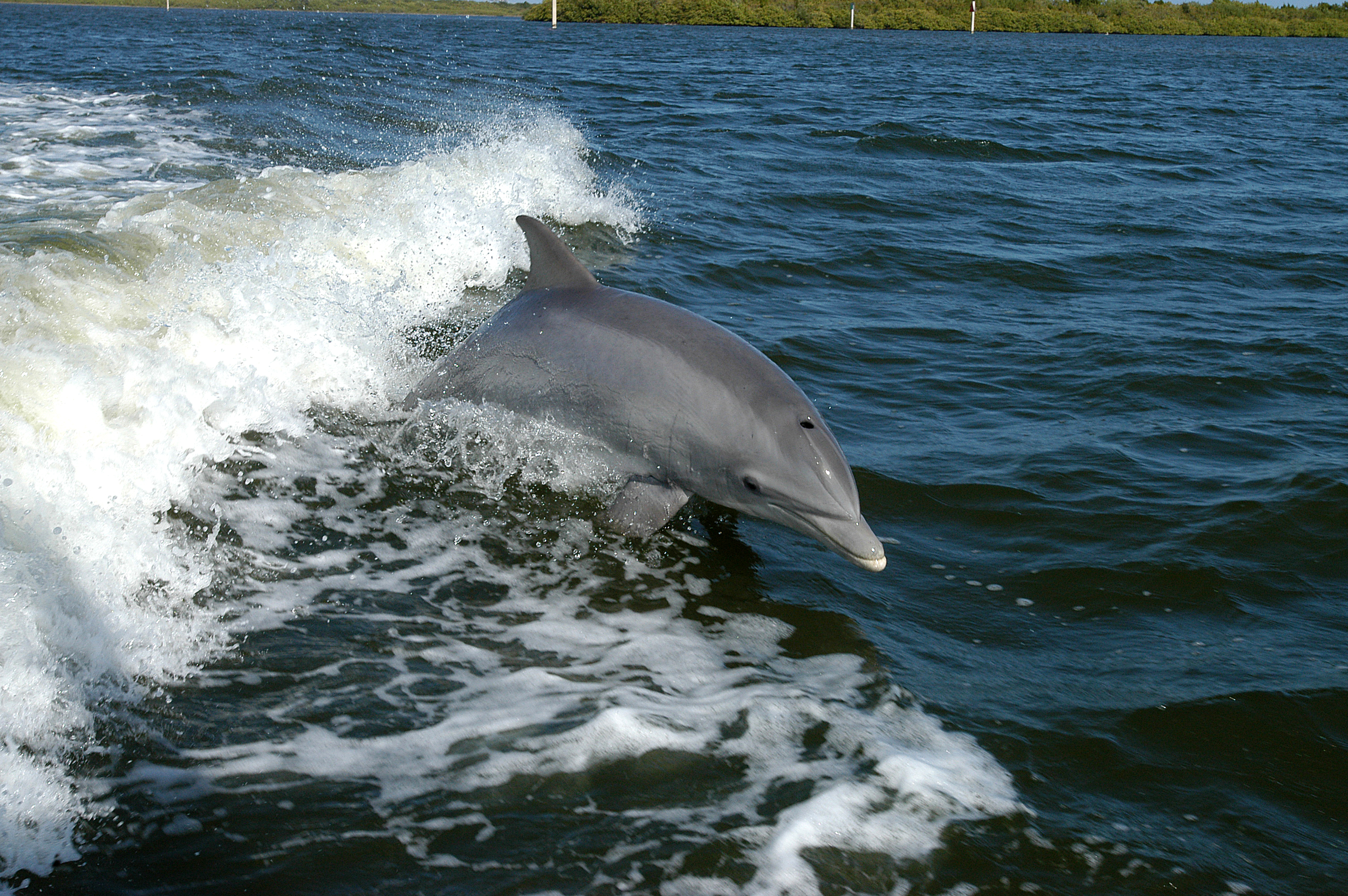
Bottlenose dolphin (Tursiops truncatus) in the wild surfs the wake of a research boat

A signature whistle is a learned, individually distinctive whistle type in a bottlenose dolphin's (Tursiops truncatus) acoustic repertoire that gives the identity of the whistle owner. The whistles are identified and studied in the wild or in captivity by researchers using hydrophones. Vocal learning strongly influences the development of signature whistles, which can remain stable for up to at least 12 years. More often than not, calves develop signature whistles by the sounds they hear while making sure that they differ from close associates. They are believed to be the most name-like signal found, so far, in non-human animals and have specialized functions and properties. Researchers define signature whistles as unique calls given most frequently during periods of group separation, with a unique frequency curve that often dominates in the repertoire of a dolphin. Each dolphin has a distinct signature whistle that other members of its social group use to individually identify the whistler. They are typically used for localisation purposes, however they also provide dolphins with behavioural context. Signature whistles have an important role in facilitating mother–calf contact, group cohesion and social interaction. Dolphins can remember the signature whistles of former partners after more than two decades and have a representational understanding of calls as demonstrated by urine/whistle crossmodal playback studies.

== Identification ==
Identification of signature whistle calls from wild, unrestrained bottlenose dolphins is essential to understand how they are used in their natural environment. Signature whistles of bottlenose dolphins can be recorded in the wild or in captivity. Hydrophones are used in both cases, but the number of devices may vary based on the researcher's preference and methodology. Using multiple hydrophones allows the researchers to better identify which dolphin emitted which whistle. Although multiple hydrophones are used, signature identification uses a single hydrophone and allows better identification. Variation between signature whistles can be tested by examining the whistle contours frequency modulation pattern. A frequency modulation pattern differs between dolphins, which is usually identified by using standard acoustic parameter measurements, such as beginning, end, maximum or minimum frequency. Combining the measurements of the frequencies will show the modulation pattern of the individuals signature whistle.

Signature whistles are difficult to identify because bottlenose dolphins emit non-signature whistles as well. However, there is a distinct amount of time in between each signature whistle that helps researchers distinguish them from the rest of dolphin noises. Signature whistles are typically emitted within 1 to 10 seconds of each other, while non-signature whistles can occur with longer or shorter intervals between each whistle. This distinction can be used to identify signature whistles in hydrophone recordings.

An early definition of signature whistles defined them as the most common whistle emitted when a dolphin is kept in isolation. This description restricted research designs to only studying dolphins in captivity. The current method for identifying signature whistles is known as signature identification, or SIGID. Developed by Janik and King, this method combines human observations with vocalization analysis. The vocalizations are recorded by a single hydrophone. This method allows researchers to better identify signature whistles when studying wild dolphins because it can be used in situations where many dolphins emit whistles at the same time.

== Development ==
A dolphin's signature whistle development is influenced by auditory experience, and usually fully develops within the first year of life, rarely changing throughout adulthood. Stable whistle call structure for at least a decade is necessary for long term call recognition between bottlenose dolphins. A calf develops its own signature whistle based on the sounds they hear and most calves develop signature whistles that differ from their close associates. Calves tend to model their signature whistles after those of adult dolphins who they do not spend much time with. Due to the fact that signature whistles are unique, a calf's signature whistle never matches a single whistle but instead has similarities to multiple whistles. However, male calves tend to develop signature whistles that resemble the signature whistles of their mothers. The male calf does not copy the whistle, instead it uses it as a model.

=== Differences between male and female signature whistles ===
After the first year, once the signature whistle has developed, male calves leave their mothers at the age of 2-3 years and form juvenile groups. At age 10, male calves form close alliances with 1-2 other males that last a lifetime. While it was previously thought that males alter their signature whistles to match others in the alliance, a 2018 study shows that the relationship between male alliances and signature whistles is a complex one: whistle convergence between individuals within a dyad could represent a symbol of their commitment to each other, similarly to avian duetting, a phenomenon where bird calls are synchronized. However, in cases of nested alliances, there could be a strong benefit to retaining an individual whistle that differentiates from the rest of the alliance group. Some males retain their original signature whistle into adulthood. Due to this diversity in signature whistle development, the impact of alliances on male signature whistles remains an open question.

Females, by contrast, have not been found to alter their signature whistle after development. While females also join juvenile groups, they often return to their mother’s group at around 7 years, and their signature whistle remains the same throughout their life.

=== Vocal learning ===
Vocal learning is essential in a dolphin calf's signature whistle development. It plays an important role in development because it helps to build an individualized whistle with a unique frequency modulation pattern. It is an animal's ability to imitate vocalizations from other animals of the same species, and eventually produces its own sounds. Social interaction plays a significant role in vocal learning. Although vocal learning is often associated with aggressive behavior in some animals, this is not the case in dolphins. Rather, vocal learning strengthens social bonds, such as those between mother-calf pairs and alliance partners.

=== Influences on signature whistle development ===
Apart from signature whistles being developed socially there are other behavioural, ecological, genetic and modification factors that can also influence the development of a dolphin's whistle. For example, signature whistles may vary from a behavioural factor and the temporal production of whistles can be affected by stress or other psychological influences. Recent studies claim that the two influences that best determine the variability between different kinds of signature whistles are the local ocean environment and the particular demographics of the dolphin population. Manna et al. note that dolphin groups that live in areas with more seagrass have higher-pitched and shorter-length whistles than groups that live in muddy seafloor environments, concluding that dolphins’ signature whistles are created to best fit their local habitat. Moreover, smaller size groups were found to change their pitch frequently, as compared to larger size groups, which maintained a more constant pitch. However, determining the contribution of different influences on signature whistle variation, aside from social influence, is difficult to achieve due to minimal populations. It is best examined in multiple populations using recordings collected from various behavioural contexts.

== Group interaction ==
=== Within groups ===
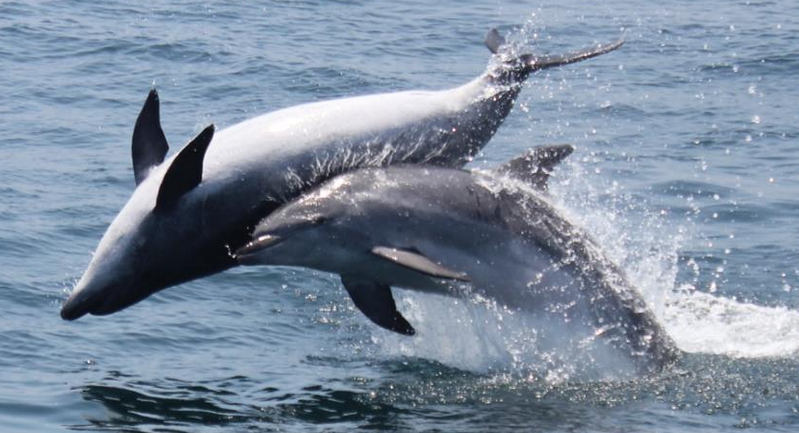
Bottlenose dolphins (tursiops truncatus) playing in the wild, participating in within-group social interaction.

Signature whistles are primarily used to locate group members, however they can also provide dolphins with the behavioural situations their group members are in. Dolphins primarily emit signature whistles when one individual is separated from the rest of the group. Non-signature whistles are the main vocalization when all of the group members are together. Although signature whistles are used to locate other dolphins, captive dolphins, who can use their sight to locate other animals, also emit these whistles. It is believed that signature whistles contain information other than location or identity, and can explain why dolphins in captivity use them. For example, signature whistles can increase due to higher levels of anthropogenic activity, potentially signifying that signature whistles are used for communication and intra-group cohesion: Buckstaff et al. (2004) found that there are an increase in signature whistles before a boat passed by a group of dolphins. Signature whistle emissions also increase during socialization and predation.

Janik et al. demonstrate that bottlenose dolphins are able to recognize identity from signature whistles even with voice features removed, making dolphins the only other animal other than humans that can convey identity-related information that does not depend on a specific voice or location. Signature whistles imply that dolphins are capable of social recognition; dolphins have been shown to remember other dolphins after over 20 years without contact, just from their whistles.

Similar to vocal learning, bottlenose dolphins demonstrate vocal copying. Bottlenose dolphins repeat another dolphin's signature whistle back in order to address that particular dolphin individually. Unlike other animals, dolphins do not display this behavior in aggressive situations. Humans and dolphins are the only known species to use vocal copying in cooperative contexts. Although this behavior is rare, dolphins with close relationships are more likely to demonstrate vocal copying. Also, bottlenose dolphins are capable of producing almost perfect copies of another dolphin's whistle. Any differences in the repeated whistle could be deliberate, reinforcing the idea that the dolphins individually address close relatives. Dolphins can use signature whistle copying to confirm if a previous message has been received, but other studies such as Watwood et al. have found that wild bottlenose dolphins often copy signature whistles of dolphins that are not in the group, reinforcing signature whistling as a means of location.

==== Child–directed communication ====
In the Sarasota Dolphin Research Program's library of recordings were 19 female common bottlenose dolphins producing signature whistles both with and without the presence of their dependent calf. In all 19 cases, the mother dolphin inflected the signature whistle when their calf was present, by reaching a higher frequency, or using a wider frequency range. Mothers have been shown to use signature whistles even more often when they are separated from their child calf: according to a study by Smolker et al., signature whistles increased as the distance from the mother and calf increased. The study also notes that infants in turn use their signature whistle to document their return to their mother. Similarly, humans use higher fundamental frequencies and a wider pitch range to inflect child–directed speech (CDS). This has rarely been discovered in other species. The researchers stated that CDS benefits for humans are cueing the child to pay attention, long-term bonding, and promoting the development of lifelong vocal learning, with parallels in these bottlenose dolphins in an example of convergent evolution.

=== Between groups ===
Dolphins also use signature whistles to provide identity information when meeting new groups of dolphins. When groups of dolphins first join whistle exchanges are a necessary component of the social interaction. Signature whistles between groups are the primary source in providing identity information due to the fact that only 10 percent of joins occurred without whistles. Signature whistle emission rates are nine times higher when two groups encounter each other than in peak whistle rates during general socialization within pods; and they repeat them multiple times during the exchange. The repetition of signature whistles increases the chances of correct identification.

Whistle matching may occur when two or more groups of dolphins encounter each other, as well. Bottlenose dolphins have low rates of aggression towards close associates and other members of the species. It is observed when a dolphin copies another individual's whistle and repeats it back. Matching occurs in order for one dolphin to acknowledge another individual's presence, which can occur when the animals are up to 600 meters apart. Signature whistles may play an important role in interactions between groups.
