= I Cried (disambiguation) =

"I Cried" is a song by Michael Elias and Billy Duke that was first recorded in 1954 by Patti Page.

I Cried may also refer to:

- "I Cried" (James Brown song), a song by James Brown and Bobby Byrd; first recorded by Tammy Montgomery in 1963

== See also ==
- "I Cried for You", a 1923 pop and jazz standard
- "I Cried for You" (Katie Melua song), single by Katie Melua from her album Piece by Piece
- I Cry (disambiguation)
- Cry (disambiguation)
