= Sir Philip Sidney game =

Model in biology and game theory

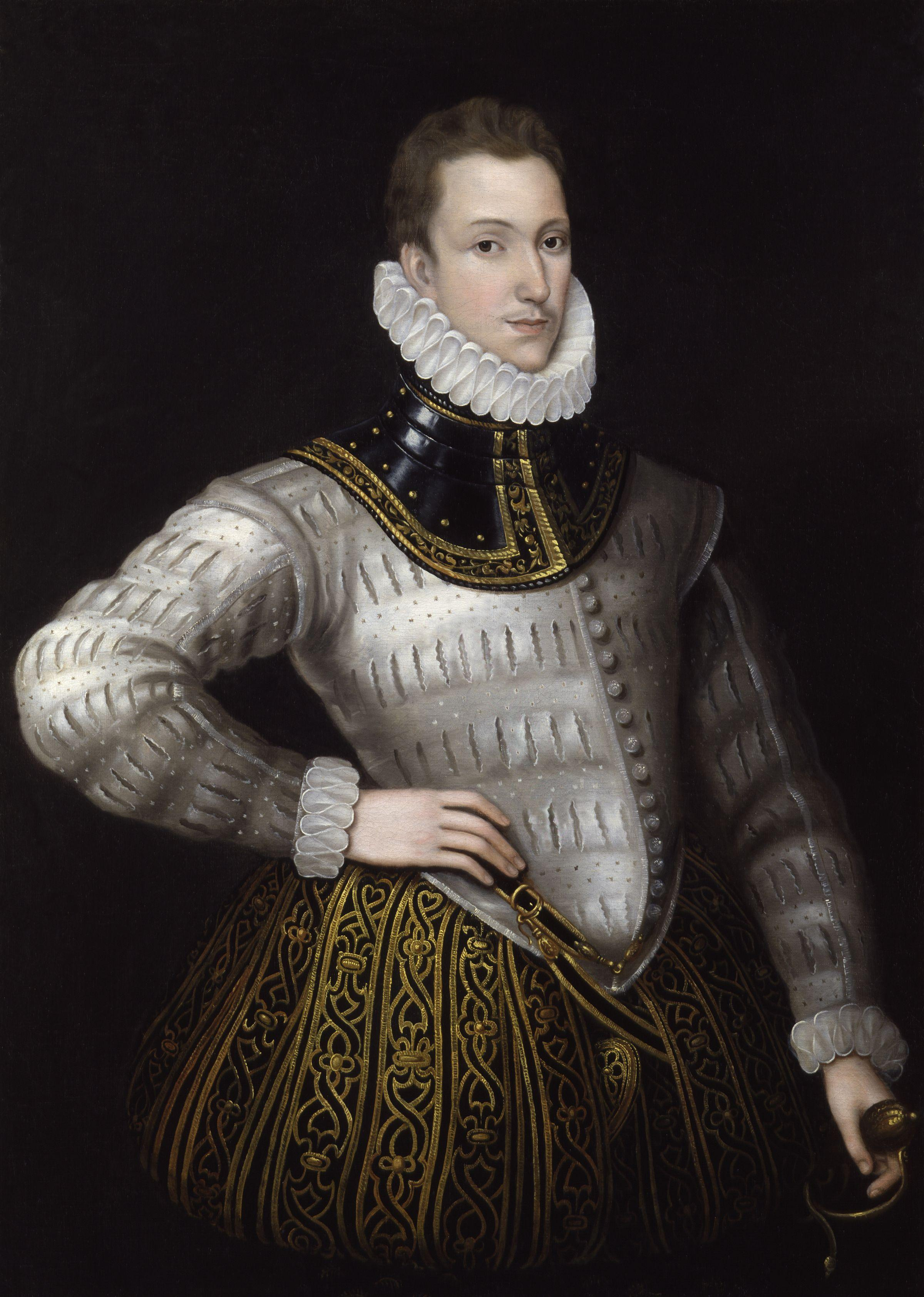
Sir Philip Sidney, after Antonis Mor

In biology and game theory, the Sir Philip Sidney game is used as a model for the evolution and maintenance of informative communication between relatives. Developed by John Maynard Smith as a model for chick begging behavior, it has been studied extensively including the development of many modified versions.

It was named after a story about Sir Philip Sidney who, fatally wounded, allegedly gave his water to another, saying, "thy necessity is yet greater than mine."

== The phenomenon ==
Young birds and other animals beg for food from their parents. It appears that in many species the intensity of begging varies with the need of the chick and that parents give more food to those chicks that beg more. Since parents respond differentially, chicks have an incentive to overstate their need since it will result in them receiving more food. If all chicks overstate their need, parents have an incentive to ignore the begging and give food using some other rule.

This situation represents a case of animal signaling where there arises an evolutionary question to explain the maintenance of the signal. The Sir Philip Sidney game formalizes a signalling theory suggestion from Amotz Zahavi, the handicap principle, that reliability is maintained by making the signal costly to produce—chicks expend energy in begging. Since it requires energy to beg, only chicks in dire need should be willing to expend the energy to secure food.

== The game ==
There are two individuals, the signaler and the responder. The responder has some good which can be transferred to the signaler or not. If the responder keeps the good, the responder has a fitness of 1, otherwise the responder has a fitness of (1 − d). The signaler can be in one of two states, healthy or needy. If the signaler receives the good, his fitness will be 1. Otherwise his fitness will be (1 − b) or (1 − a) if healthy or needy respectively (where a > b). The signaler can send a signal or not. If he sends the signal he incurs a cost of c regardless of the outcome.

If individuals maximize their own fitness the responder should never transfer the good, since he is reducing his own fitness for no gain. However, it supposed that the signaler and responder are related by some degree r. Each individual attempts to maximize his inclusive fitness, and so in some cases the responder would like to transfer the good.

The case of interest is where the responder only wants to transfer the good to the needy signaler, but the signaler would want the good regardless of his state. This creates a partial conflict of interest, where there would be an incentive for deception. Maynard Smith showed, however, that for certain values of c, honest signaling can be an evolutionarily stable strategy. This suggests that it might be sustained by evolution.

== Criticisms ==
The empirical study of chick begging has cast some doubt on the appropriateness of the Sir Philip Sidney game and on the handicap principle as an explanation for chick begging behavior. Several empirical studies have attempted to measure the cost of begging, in effect measuring c. These studies have found that although there is a cost, it is far lower than would be sufficient to sustain honesty. Since the actual benefits of food are hard to calculate, the required value of c cannot be determined exactly, but it nonetheless has raised concern.

In addition to the empirical concern, there has been theoretical concern. In a series of papers, Carl Bergstrom and Michael Lachmann suggest that in many biologically possible cases we should not expect to find signaling despite the fact that it is an evolutionarily stable strategy. They point out that whenever a signaling strategy is evolutionarily stable, non-signaling equilibria are as well. As a result, evolutionary stability alone does not require the evolution of signaling. In addition, they note that in many of these cases the signaling equilibrium is pareto inferior to the non-signaling one – both the chick and parent are worse off than if there was no signaling. Since one would expect non-signalling to be the ancestral state, it is unclear how evolution would move a population from a superior equilibrium to an inferior one.

Both of these concerns led Bergstrom and Lachmann to suggest a modified game where honesty is maintained, not by signal cost, but instead by the common interest inherent in interaction among relatives. In their partial pooling model, individuals have no incentive to lie, because the lie would harm their relative proportionally more than it would help them. As a result, they do better by remaining honest.
