= Cry, the Beloved Country (disambiguation) =

Cry, the Beloved Country is a 1948 novel by Alan Paton.

Cry, the Beloved Country may also refer to:

- Cry, the Beloved Country (1951 film)
- Cry, the Beloved Country (1995 film)

== See also ==
- Lost in the Stars (1974 film), a 1974 film version of Kurt Weill-Maxwell Anderson musical adaptation of Alan Paton's novel
