= Cry Cry Cry (disambiguation) =

Cry Cry Cry is a musical supergroup comprising Richard Shindell, Lucy Kaplansky and Dar Williams.

Cry Cry Cry may also refer to:

- "Cry, Cry, Cry", a song composed by Sunny Skylar and Vaughn Monroe, recorded by Peggy Lee in 1950
- "Cry! Cry! Cry!", a 1955 song by Johnny Cash
- "Cry, Cry, Cry", a song by Bobby Bland on the 1961 album Two Steps from the Blues
- "Cry, Cry, Cry", a song by The Easybeats on the 1965 album Easy
- "Cry, Cry, Cry" (Connie Smith song), a 1968 song by Connie Smith
- "Cry, Cry, Cry", a song by Roxy Music on the 1979 album Manifesto (Roxy Music album)
- "Cry, Cry, Cry", a song by Neil Young on the 1983 album Everybody's Rockin'
- "Cry, Cry, Cry" (Highway 101 song), a song by Highway 101 their 1988 eponymous album
- Cry Cry Cry (Cry Cry Cry album), a 1998 album by the supergroup Cry Cry Cry
- "Cry, Cry, Cry", a song by Ziggy Marley (featuring Jack Johnson and Paula Fuga) on the 2009 album Family Time
- Cry Cry Cry (Wolf Parade album), a 2017 album by indie rock band Wolf Parade
- "Cry Cry Cry", a song by Coldplay on the 2019 album Everyday Life
