= Eyebrow flash =

Raising of eyebrows as a social signal

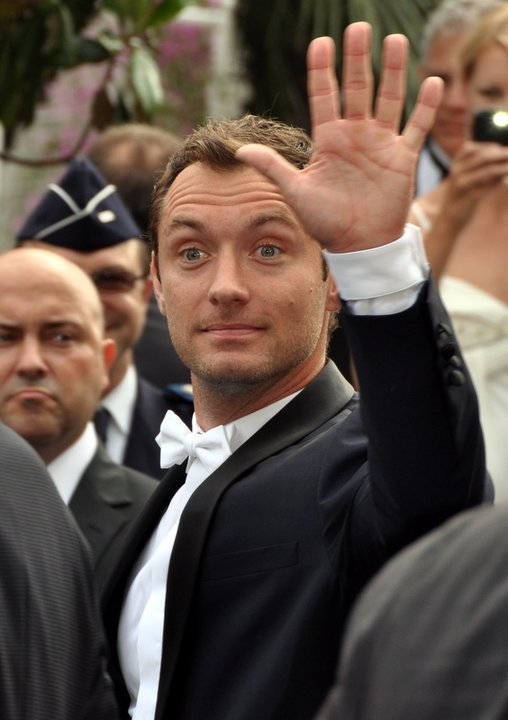
Jude Law showing an eyebrow flash

The eyebrow flash is an unconscious social signal, a raising of the eyebrows for about a fifth of a second that communicates a wish to approach another whom the sender recognizes and is preparing for social contact (such as a greeting). People generally return an eyebrow flash, unless they do not recognize the sender, or the sender looks away immediately after. The message must be interpreted in context. Psychologists and sociologists say that eyebrow raising can be a reaction to fear or surprise.

== Measurement ==
Grammer et al. define an eyebrow flash as a contraction of the inner brow raiser muscle (M. Frontalis, pars medialis) and the outer brow raiser muscle (M. frontalis, pars lateralis) as defined by the Facial Action Coding System. An eyebrow flash is subdivided into three time intervals: the onset (the time during which the eyebrows raise to their maximal position), the apex (the time during which the eyebrows are in their maximal position), and the offset (the time during which the eyebrows lower to their original state).

== Cross-cultural studies ==
A study conducted in 1987 recorded approximately 67 hours of unstaged social interactions conducted by 255 individuals from three locations: Western New Guinea, Papua New Guinea, and Upper Orinoco. The study found significant differences in the age and sex of senders and receivers among the populations studied; for instance, Eipo men from Western New Guinea were more likely to be senders, while Trobriand men from Papua New Guinea were more likely to be receivers. Across all three cultures, a lowering of the eyelids or a head movement often coincided with the beginning of an eyebrow flash. Additionally, people from all three cultures exhibited longer-duration eyebrow flashes at the openings of conversations than during conversations.
